= Gongsun =

- Gongsun in regular script
- Pronunciation: Gōngsūn (Pinyin); Kong-sun (Pe̍h-ōe-jī)
- Language: Chinese

Origin
- Language: Chinese language

Other names
- Variant form: Gongsun (Mandarin)

Gongsun (simplified Chinese: 公孙; traditional Chinese: 公孫; pinyin: Gōngsūn; Wade–Giles: Kung-sun) is one of the few Chinese compound surnames.

Famous people with this surname include:

- Gongsun Xuanyuan, reputed name of the Yellow Emperor; other sources say his surname was Ji
- Gongsun Shu, emperor of Chengjia
- Gongsun Yang, Legalist philosopher
- Gongsun Yan (Xishou [犀首]), Warring States era Qin premier and Wei strategist
- Gongsun Xi, Warring States era Wei general
- Gongsun Long, philosopher, Logician
- Gongsun Hong Western Han dynasty philosopher, Confucian scholar
- Gongsun Ao General of the Han dynasty
- Gongsun He, General of the Han dynasty
- Gongsun Zan, warlord and general of the Han dynasty
- Rulers of Liaodong in the Three Kingdoms:
  - Gongsun Du, general of the Han dynasty
  - Gongsun Kang, elder son of Gongsun Du
  - Gongsun Gong, younger son of Gongsun Du
  - Gongsun Yuan, younger son of Gongsun Kang, claimed independence and set up Yan Kingdom
- Gongsun Qiao, statesman of the State of Zheng
- Gongsun Sheng, character from Water Margin
- Gongsun Lü'e, character from The Return of the Condor Heroes
- Gongsun Ce, the adviser or personal secretary of Bao Zheng
