= Xiangping =

Xiangping (Chinese: 襄平) is a historical name of Liaoyang, Liaoning province. Xiangping was first mentioned in history as the capital of the Liaodong Commandery in the state of Yan, and the eastern terminus of the Great Wall of Yan established in 284 BC. After the unification of China by the Qin dynasty, Xiangping became the political and cultural center of what is now Northeastern China. From the 4th century onward, Xiangping was successively ruled by the Former Yan and Later Yan. The city was taken by Goguryeo in AD 404 and renamed to Liaodong/Yodong (遼東) City. It saw several major battles during the Goguryeo–Sui War and Goguryeo–Tang Wars before eventually falling to the Tang dynasty.

== Warring States ==
Before the Yan conquest, the area was inhabited by the Donghu people, Shanrong, and Gija Joseon. In 300 BC, the Yan general Qin Kai established Liaodong Commandery, with Xiangping as its capital. The Yan subsequently constructed its Great Wall, and Xiangping was the eastern terminus.

During the reign of King Zhao of Yan, Qin Kai was sent to the Donghu as a hostage, and was deeply trusted by the Donghu people. When Qin Kai returned to Yan, he raised a force and decimated the Donghu, and per the Records of the Grand Historian, 'drove the Donghu a thousand li east'. With the expansion of their borders, the Yan started to build the earliest version of the Yan Great Wall. The Yan Great Wall started in the west at Zaoyang (造陽) and ended in the east at Xiangping. The Kingdom of Yan was conquered by the Qin in 222 BC. In 221 BC, Qin Shihuang divided China into 36 commanderies, retaining the Yan-established Liaodong Commandery, with its commandery capital set at Xiangping.

== Han dynasty and Three Kingdoms ==
During both the Western and Eastern Han Dynasties, the Qin's Liaodong Commandery was retained, but the most important matters of governance of the Northeast were handled at the Four Commanderies of Han. For example, the Han vassal state of Buyeo was initially placed under the jurisdiction of the Xuantu Commandery, but the king of Buyeo during the reign of Emperor Xian of Han requested to change the jurisdiction of Buyeo under the Liaodong Commandery instead.

In the chaos of the late Eastern Han Dynasty and early Three Kingdoms period, Liaodong Commandery prospered, due to its location far from the warlordism and warfare going on in China, and many scholars and talented individuals sought refuge at Xiangping. In 189 AD, Gongsun Du (公孙度), a Liaodong native and former governor of Liaodong, declared himself the Marquis of Liaodong and governor of the newly established Pingzhou. Gongsun Du divided the Liaodong Commandery into three, establishing the Liangdong (辽东), Zhongliao (中辽), and Liaoxi (辽西) Commandaries. The newly established Liaodong Commandery contained 8 counties, including Xiangping, Jujiu (居就), and Anshi (安市) counties. Gongsun Du's grandson Gongsun Yuan (公孙渊) declared himself the King of Yan in 237 AD, but was killed during Sima Yi's Liaodong campaign the next year. Sima Yi ordered all of Gongsun Yuan's officials to be killed, and all men aged 15 and above in Xiangping to be massacred. Over 10,000 bodies were stacked in a mound to terrorise the locals. With the Kingdom of Yan vanquished, the Kingdom of Wei merged Pingzhou with Youzhou, and set the capital of Liaodong Commandery at Xiangping, governing over 9 counties. The important new martial position of Dongyi Jiaowei (东夷校尉) was established to govern over non-Han peoples.

== Jin dynasty and Sixteen Kingdoms ==
In 274 AD, during the reign of Emperor Wu of Jin, Pingzhou (平州) was reestablished, governing the Liaodong (辽东郡), Xuantu (玄菟郡) and Changli (昌黎郡) Commandaries. The position of Dongyi Jiaowei was renamed Hudongyi Jiaowei (护东夷校尉), and given simulatenously to the regional inspector/cishi of Pingzhou, with the Jiaowei's authority extended to managing the relations with the many disparate peoples of the East, as far north as the Heilongjiang area and southwards, the entirety of the Korean peninsula. In 277 AD, Sima Rui (司馬蕤) was given the title of King of Liaodong, and Liaodong Commandery was reestablished as the Kingdom of Liaodong. 6 years later, Sima Rui was given another title, the King of Donglai, and the Liaodong Kingdom was reverted to Liaodong Commandery.

In 334 AD, the Xianbei leader Murong Huang seized Xiangping. Later on, he would declare himself the King of Yan of the Former Yan Dynasty. In 380 AD, Former Yan was destroyed by Former Qin, and Liaodong was seized. In 384 AD, Murong Chui established the kingdom of Later Yan.

== Goguryeo ==
In 404 AD, the Goguryeo seized Liaodong, and renamed Xiangping to Liaodong/Yodong. The name of Xiangping was never used again. Most of Later Yan's lands were annexed by Goguryeo, and the later kingdom of Northern Yan set Liaodong Commandery within the confines of the area west of today's Liaoning. The region was contested territory between the northern Korean Kingdom of Goguryeo and the various imperial dynasties of China. The two political forces competed with each-other over trade and influence in the area by constructing fortresses in strategic locations.

Yodong fortress was established prior to the year 612, possibly as early as 397. The fortress was considered to be a formidable defensive obstacle as it was located near the strategically important Liao River. The fortress protected the roads leading into Korea and the nearby Goguryeo cities of Yodong and Baegam. One source refers to the fortress as the anchor of the Korean kingdom's border defense. The fortress was well-stocked with provisions and maintained a large complement of troops in case of a siege.

In 435 AD, during the Northern Wei dynasty, Jangsu of Goguryeo sent tribute, and Northern Wei gave Jangsu the title of King of Goguryeo and Duke of Liaodong Commandery.

In 492 AD, Munjamyeong of Goguryeo was given the title of Duke Kaiguo of Liaodong. In 519, Anjang of Goguryeo was regiven the title.

In 577 AD, during the Northern Zhou dynasty, the king of Goguryeo was given the title of the King of Liaodong. Shortly thereafter, Northern Qi disestablished Liaodong Commandery. Yodong fortress was located at the same place and had a similar size as the Western Han Xiangping.

In 598 AD, Goguryeo launched an attack across the Liao river against the newly-risen Sui dynasty. The Chinese retaliated in 612 by launching a massive retaliatory attack into Goguryeo territory, laying siege to Yodong fortress. The fortresses' defenders refused to surrender and successfully held off the Sui army. Frustrated by the invasion's lack of progress, one third of the Sui army disengaged itself from the siege and marched on the Goguryeo capital of Pyongyang. The Sui army would later be destroyed at the pivotal Battle of Salsu; the war continued until 614, but the battle effectively ending the Goguryeo–Sui War in favor of Goguryeo.

Following the conflict with the Sui dynasty, Goguryeo strengthened its border defenses in preparation for a future war with the Chinese. This war came when in 642 the Tang Dynasty invaded Goguryeo, successfully breaching the latter's border defenses. Yodong fortress, which was garrisoned with 10,000 soldiers and holding 40,000 civilians, held off the Tang army for some time, but an army sent to relieve the fortress was destroyed. The Tang were able to breach the fortress walls with a rapid cavalry assault, and Yodong was eventually captured and its inhabitants enslaved. Emperor Taizong of Tang would later intercede and offer freedom to the prisoners and the fortress was incorporated into a new Imperial prefecture. However, the Tang unsuccessfully besieged Ansi and were forced to retreat into Northern China.

== Tang dynasty ==
The Goguryeo kingdom eventually collapsed in the final war of 668. The Tang established Liaocheng Prefecture (遼城州) at Liaodong City. Liaodong became the capital of the Andong Protectorate in 676. However, the capital was moved again the following year.

== See also ==
- List of Goguryeo fortresses in China
