= Mohuba =

Murong-Xianbei founder and chieftain

- Traditional Chinese: 莫護跋
- Simplified Chinese: 莫护跋
Transcriptions
Standard Mandarin
- Hanyu Pinyin: Mòhùbá
- Wade–Giles: Mo-hu-ba

Mohuba (fl. 238–244) was a Xianbei chieftain who lived during the Three Kingdoms period of China. He is accredited with being the founder of the Murong tribe.

== Life ==
Mohuba's people initially lived outside the Great Wall. Legend has it that his eight ancestor was Qiangui (乾帰), who was said to have descended from heaven on a white horse with armour, robe, saddle and bridle made out of gold and silver. The Xianbei people regarded him as a god and elected him as their leader.

Not long after the Cao Wei dynasty was established in China, Mohuba and his people migrated to Liaoxi Commandery, where they settled down. In 238, the Grand Commandant of Wei, Sima Yi launched a military campaign against the Liaodong warlord, Gongsun Yuan. Mohuba supported Sima Yi, and after the campaign, he was made the King of Shuaiyi (率義王), and his tribe was given permission to live north of Jicheng (棘城, in modern Jinzhou, Liaoning).

According to the Book of Jin, Mohuba gave his tribe the name "Murong" after seeing that many people of the Yan and Dai regions wore Buyao crowns. Fancying the crowns, he started tying up his hair and wearing them. His tribe began calling him "Buyao", and eventually, the word was corrupted into "Murong". Another account in the same record states that the name comes from the saying that he "admired the virtues of the Two Apparatus (Heaven and Earth), and inherited the appearance of the Three Lights (Sun, Moon and Stars)" (慕二儀之德，繼三光之容). Taking the first and last character of the phrase, he adopted the family name of "Murong" (慕容). However, a later theory suggests that Mohuba was the descendant of a prominent Xianbei chieftain during the time of Tanshihuai's confederation, Murong, and Mohuba decided to name his tribe after his ancestor.

After Mohuba's death, he was succeeded by his son, Murong Muyan. The exact year that he died is not recorded, but Muyan was first active as chieftain in 244, so he must have died before that year.
