= Bei Yan =

Bei Yan may refer to:

- Northern Yan (407–436), one of the Sixteen Kingdoms
- Bei Yan (卑衍, fl. 238), a general under the warlord Gongsun Yuan, see Sima Yi's Liaodong campaign
