= Murong Muyan =

Murong-Xianbei chieftain

- Chinese: 慕容木延
Transcriptions
Standard Mandarin
- Hanyu Pinyin: Mùróng Mùyán
- Wade–Giles: Mu-jung Mu-yen

Murong Muyan (fl. 244–281) was a chieftain of the Murong-Xianbei tribe who lived during the Three Kingdoms period of China.

== Life ==
Murong Muyan was the son of Mohuba, the founder of the Murong tribe. After his father's death, Muyan succeeded him and maintained his vassalage to the Cao Wei and later the Western Jin dynasty.

In the Goguryeo–Wei War of 244, the Wei general Guanqiu Jian led a campaign against the Goguryeo. Muyan accompanied Guanqiu and made great contributions in the campaign. According to the Annals of the Sixteen Kingdoms, Muyan was appointed Worthy Prince of the East and Grand Chief Controller for his achievements, but the Book of Wei only states that he received the former office.

The remainder of Muyan's reign is not recorded. He was eventually succeeded by his son, Murong Shegui, who was already tribe's chieftain by 281, so Muyan must have died before that year.
