= Wigutae of Buyeo =

Wigutae of Buyeo 위구태왕

King of Buyeo
- Reign: Unknown
- Predecessor: Butae of Buyeo
- Successor: Ganwigeo of Buyeo
- Died: Unknown
- Spouse: A daughter of Gongsun Du
- Issue: Ganwigeo

King Wigutae was king of Buyeo.

== Biography ==
Nothing is known about Wigutae's ancestors or year of birth.

In 111, the king of Buyeo reportedly sent 7.000 to 8.000 horsemen to raid the Lelang Commandery of the later Han. In 120, in reconciliation, he sent his heir, Wigutae, to pay tribute to emperor An, who gave him a golden medal and a seal.

In 121, king Taejodae of Goguryeo led thousands of horsemen from the area of the Mahan confederacy to the area of the Yemaek people to attack the Xuantu commandery. The king of Buyeo then sent his heir, Wigutae, with 20.000 men to repel the forces of Goguryeo.

When Wutae came to the throne, he married a daughter of Gongsun Du, an influential warlord from the Liaodong peninsula.

After his death he would be succeeded by his son, Gangwigeo.

== Identity ==
Weigutae is mentioned both in the Book of the Later Han and in the Records of the Three Kingdoms. In the first of the two he is mentioned as heir of the throne of Buyeo during the early 120s. While in the second he his mentioned as a contemporary of Gongsun Du, who lived at the end of the 2nd century. Probably, the two are not the same person, even considering the fact that in 167 the king of Buyeo was called Butae.
