= Yodong Muk clan =

Korean clan from Liaodong, China

- Country: Korea
- Current region: Liaodong Commandery (Hanja: 遼東郡)

Yodong Muk clan (Korean: 요동 묵씨; Hanja: 遼東 墨氏) was one of the Korean clans. Their Bon-gwan was in Liaodong Commandery (Hanja: 遼東郡), China. According to the research in 1985, the number of Yodong Muk clan was 274. Muk clan was born in Liang County (Hanja: 梁郡), China. Yodong Muk clan was one of the descendants of Mozi who was a thinker from Lu in China's Spring and Autumn period.

== See also ==
- Korean clan names of foreign origin
