= Gongsun Gong =

3rd-century Eastern Han dynasty warlord

- 公孫恭

General of Chariots and Cavalry (車騎將軍)
- In office 220–228
- Monarch: Cao Pi / Cao Rui

Administrator of Liaodong (遼東太守)
- In office December 220–228
- Monarch: Cao Pi / Cao Rui
- Succeeded by: Gongsun Yuan
- In office 210–220
- Monarch: Emperor Xian of Han
- Preceded by: Gongsun Kang

Personal details
- Born: Unknown
- Died: after 238
- Parent: Gongsun Du (father)
- Relatives: Gongsun Kang (elder brother); Gongsun Huang (nephew); Gongsun Yuan (nephew)
- Occupation: Military general, politician, warlord
- Peerage: Marquis of Pingguo (平郭侯)

Gongsun Gong (Chinese: 公孫恭; pinyin: Gōngsūn Gōng, pronounced [kóŋsún kóŋ]; fl. 200s–230s) was a Chinese military general, politician, and warlord who lived during the late Eastern Han dynasty and early Three Kingdoms. He was a son of Gongsun Du and a younger brother of Gongsun Kang, who both consecutively served as the Administrators of Liaodong Commandery in northeastern China. In 207, he advised his brother Gongsun Kang to execute the warlords Yuan Xi and Yuan Shang , who had fled to Liaodong Commandery for shelter after their defeat by the warlord Cao Cao. Gongsun Kang did so and sent the Yuans' heads to Cao Cao. After Gongsun Kang died, Gongsun Gong succeeded his brother as the new Administrator of Liaodong Commandery because Gongsun Kang's sons were too young at the time to assume the office. Gongsun Gong remained as a vassal of the Eastern Han dynasty and later pledged allegiance to the Cao Wei state, which replaced the Eastern Han dynasty in 220. In the same year, the Wei emperor Cao Pi granted Gongsun Gong the nominal appointment of General of Chariots and Cavalry (車騎將軍). In 228, Gongsun Yuan, Gongsun Kang's son, seized power from his uncle Gongsun Gong and put him in prison. After roughly 9 years of rule, Gongsun Yuan rebelled against Wei, but the rebellion was suppressed by the Wei general Sima Yi in 238. Gongsun Gong was released after that. His eventual fate is unknown.

== See also ==
- Lists of people of the Three Kingdoms
