= Butae of Buyeo =

Butae of Buyeo 부태왕

King of Buyeo
- Reign: 167 – 174
- Predecessor: Unknown
- Successor: Wigutae of Buyeo
- Died: Unknown
- Spouse: Unknown
- Issue: Unknown
- Father: Unknown

King Butae was king of Buyeo.

== Biography ==
The only known account on Butae's life comes from the Book of the Later Han.

In 167, Butae attacked the Xuantu Commandery of the Eastern Han with 20 thousand soldiers. The commandery's prefect, Gongsun Yun defeated him and killed one thousand of his men.

In 174, Butae reconciled with the Han emperor Ling, to which he paid tribute.
