= Three Kingdoms =

Period of Chinese history from 220 to 280 CE

Three Kingdoms period 三國時代 三国时代
- 220–280 AD
- Evolution of territory controlled by Chinese states between 190 and 280 AD
- Location: China proper
- Key events: End of the Han dynasty (189–220); Battle of Red Cliffs (208); Battle of Xiaoting (221–222)

Three Kingdoms

Chinese name
- Traditional Chinese: 三國
- Simplified Chinese: 三国
- Hanyu Pinyin: Sānguó
Transcriptions
Standard Mandarin
- Hanyu Pinyin: Sānguó
- Bopomofo: ㄙㄢ ㄍㄨㄛˊ
- Wade–Giles: San^{1}-kuo^{2}
- Yale Romanization: Sān-gwó
- IPA: [sán.kwǒ]
Yue: Cantonese
- Yale Romanization: Sāamgwok
- Jyutping: Saam1 gwok3
- IPA: [sam˥ kʷɔk̚˧]

Vietnamese name
- Vietnamese: Tam Quốc
- Hán-Nôm: 三國

Korean name
- Hangul: 삼국
- Hanja: 三國
Transcriptions
- Revised Romanization: Samguk

Japanese name
- Kyūjitai: 三國
- Shinjitai: 三国
Transcriptions
- Romanization: Sangoku

The Three Kingdoms of Cao Wei, Shu Han, and Eastern Wu dominated China from 220 to 280 AD following the end of the Han dynasty. This period was preceded by the Eastern Han dynasty and was followed by the Western Jin dynasty. Academically, the periodisation begins with the establishment of Cao Wei in 220 AD and ends with the conquest of Wu by Jin in 280 AD. The period immediately preceding the Three Kingdoms, from 184 to 220 AD, was marked by chaotic infighting among warlords across China as Han authority collapsed. The period from 220 to 263 AD was marked by a comparatively stable arrangement between Cao Wei, Shu Han, and Eastern Wu. This stability broke down with the conquest of Shu by Wei in 263 AD, followed by the usurpation of Cao Wei by Jin in 266 AD and ultimately the conquest of Wu by Jin in 280 AD.

The Three Kingdoms period which included the collapse of the Han was one of the most dangerous periods in Chinese history due to multiple plagues, widespread famines, and civil war. A nationwide census taken in 280 AD, following the reunification of the Three Kingdoms under the Jin, showed a total of 2,459,840 households and 16,163,863 individuals, significantly fewer than the 10,677,960 households and 56,486,856 individuals reported during the Han era. While the census may not have been particularly accurate due to a multitude of factors of the times, in 280 AD, the Jin did make an attempt to account for all individuals where they could.

Technology advanced significantly during this period. Shu chancellor Zhuge Liang invented the wooden ox, suggested to be an early form of the wheelbarrow, and improved on the repeating crossbow. Wei mechanical engineer Ma Jun is considered by many to be the equal of his predecessor Zhang Heng. He invented a hydraulic-powered, mechanical puppet theatre designed for Emperor Ming of Wei, square-pallet chain pumps for irrigation of gardens in Luoyang, and the ingenious design of the south-pointing chariot, a non-magnetic directional compass operated by differential gears.

The authoritative historical record of the era is Chen Shou's Records of the Three Kingdoms (c. 290 AD), in tandem with the later annotations published in 429 AD by Pei Songzhi. While comparatively short, the Three Kingdoms period has been romanticised in the culture of the Sinosphere. It has been retold and dramatised in folklore, opera, and novels, as well as film, television, and video games. The most well-known fictional adaptation of the history is Romance of the Three Kingdoms, a historical novel written during the Ming dynasty by Luo Guanzhong.

== Periodization ==
There is no set time period for the era. The majority view uses the years 220–280 as endpoints, beginning with the abdication of the last Han emperor and ending with the reunification of China by the first Jin emperor. Strictly speaking, the Three Kingdoms, or independent states, only existed from the proclamation of the Eastern Wu ruler to be emperor in 229 until the downfall of Shu Han in 263. Interpretations of the period outside performative political acts push the beginning back into the later years of the Han, with the decline of the Han royal house.

Several other starting points for the period are given by Chinese historians: the Yellow Turban Rebellion in 184; the year after the beginning of the rebellion, 185; Dong Zhuo deposing Emperor Shao of Han and enthroning Emperor Xian of Han in 189, Dong Zhuo sacking Luoyang and moving the capital to Chang'an in 190, or Cao Cao placing the emperor under his control in Xuchang in 196.

As the Jin unification was itself short-lived, lasting at least until the start of the Sixteen Kingdoms period with the independence of Cheng-Han and Han-Zhao in 304, the entire period between the fall of Han and the Sui unification (220–589) is sometimes periodised together as "the period of disunity", "Wei, Jin, Northern and Southern dynasties" (or even "Northern and Southern dynasties" alone, though that more commonly means 420–589 between Jin and Sui), or "the Six Dynasties period".

== Prelude ==
=== Yellow Turban Rebellion ===
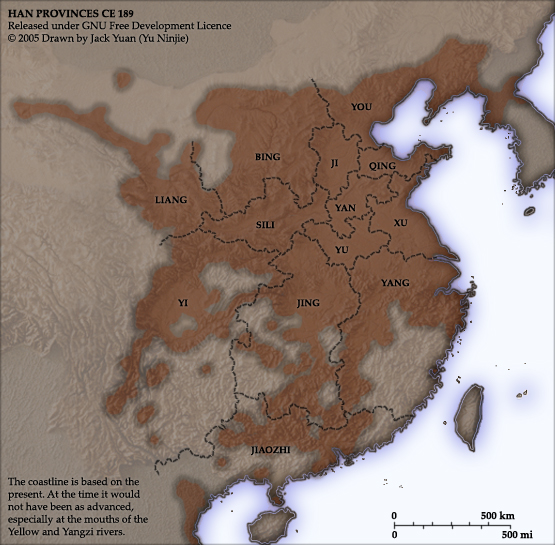
Map of Chinese provinces on the eve of Three Kingdoms period, 189 AD

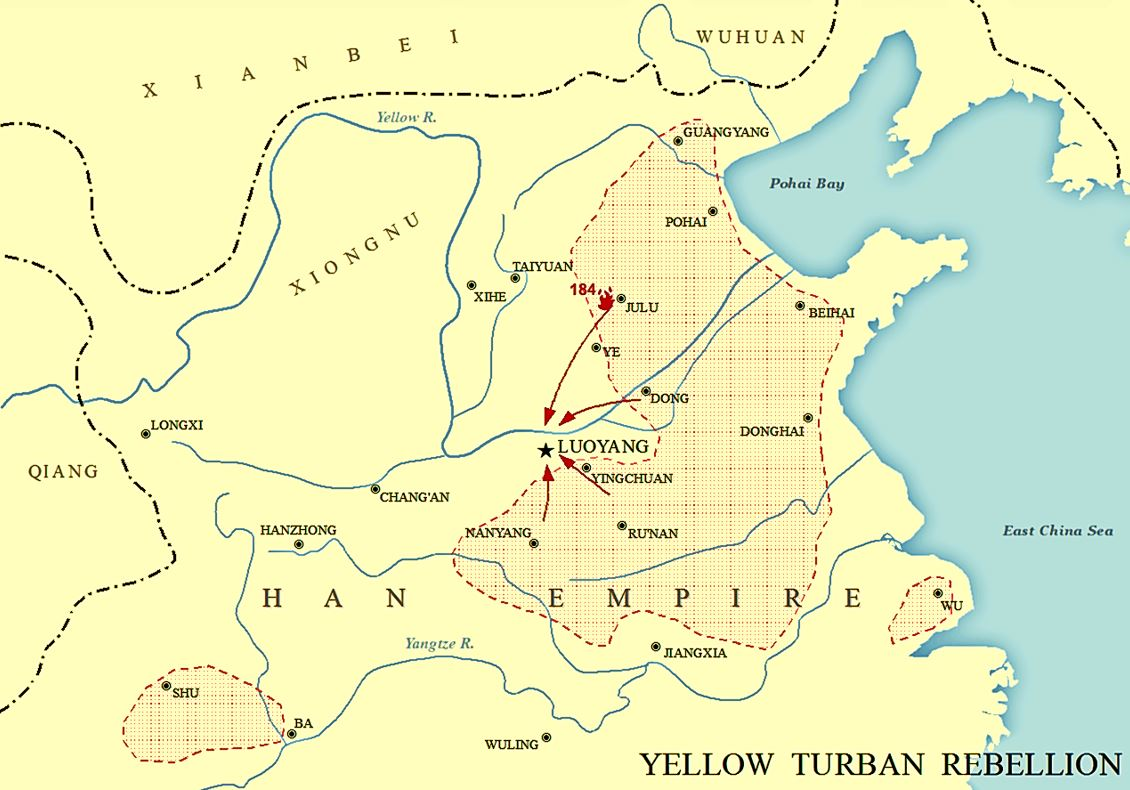
Map showing the Yellow Turban Rebellion

The power of the Eastern Han dynasty had steadily declined owing to a variety of political and economic problems after the death of Emperor He in 105 AD. A series of Han emperors ascended the throne while still youths, and De facto imperial power often rested with the emperors' older relatives. As these relatives occasionally were loath to give up their influence, emperors would, upon reaching maturity, be forced to rely on political alliances with senior officials and eunuchs to achieve control of the government. Political posturing and infighting between imperial relatives and eunuch officials were a constant problem in the Chinese government at the time. During the reigns of Emperor Huan (r. 146–168) and Emperor Ling (r. 168–189), leading officials' dissatisfaction with the eunuchs' usurpation of power reached a peak, and many began to openly protest against them. The first and second protests met with failure, and the court eunuchs persuaded the emperor to execute many of the protesting scholars. Some local rulers seized the opportunity to exert despotic control over their lands and citizens, since many feared to speak out in the oppressive political climate. Emperors Huan and Ling's reigns were recorded as particularly dark periods of Han dynasty rule. In addition to political oppression and mismanagement, China experienced a number of natural disasters during this period, and local rebellions sprung up throughout the country.

In the third month of 184, Zhang Jiao, leader of the Way of Supreme Peace, a Taoist movement, along with his two brothers Zhang Liang and Zhang Bao, led the movement's followers in a rebellion against the government that was called the Yellow Turban Rebellion. Their movement quickly attracted followers and soon numbered several hundred thousand and received support from many parts of China. They had 36 bases throughout China, with large bases having 10,000 or more followers and minor bases having 6,000 to 7,000, similar to Han armies. Their motto was:

"The Azure Sky (Note: Referring to the Han dynasty government; the word 蒼, here glossed as grey, is specifically the colour of an old person's hair, alluding to the decrepit state of the Han) has perished, the Yellow Sky (Note: Referring to the Yellow Turban Rebellion) will soon rise; in this year of jiazi, (Note: Jiazi is the first step of the sexagenary cycle, signifying a new beginning) let there be prosperity in the world!"
(蒼天已死，黃天當立。歲在甲子，天下大吉。) (Note: Book of Han – Record of Emperor Xiaoling and the Zizhi Tongjian -Guanghe Year 6 record that Zhang Jiao declared himself Yellow Emperor and took their movement's name from a headscarf worn by followers [yellow signifying the Yellow Emperor and imperial authority].)

Emperor Ling dispatched generals Huangfu Song, Lu Zhi, and Zhu Jun to lead the Han armies against the rebels, and decreed that local governments had to supply soldiers to assist in their efforts. The Yellow Turbans were ultimately defeated and its surviving followers dispersed throughout China, but due to the turbulent situation throughout the empire, many were able to survive as bandits in mountainous areas, thus continuing their ability to contribute to the turmoil of the era.

With the widespread increase in bandits across the Chinese nation, the Han army had no way to repel each and every raiding party. In 188, Emperor Ling accepted a memorial from Liu Yan suggesting he grant direct administrative power over feudal provinces and direct command of regional military to local governors, as well as promoting them in rank and filling such positions with members of the Liu family or court officials. This move made provinces (zhou) official administrative units, and although they had power to combat rebellions, the later intra-governmental chaos allowed these local governors to easily rule independently of the central government. Liu Yan was also promoted as governor of Yi Province (roughly covering the Sichuan Basin). Soon after this move, Liu Yan severed all of his region's ties to the Han imperial court, and several other areas followed suit.

=== Dong Zhuo in power ===
In the same year, Emperor Ling died, and another struggle began between the court eunuchs for control of the imperial family. Court eunuch Jian Shuo planned to kill Regent Marshal He Jin, a relative of the imperial family, and to replace the crown prince Liu Bian with his younger brother Liu Xie, the Prince of Chenliu (present-day Kaifeng), though his plan was unsuccessful. Liu Bian took the Han throne as Emperor Shao, and He Jin plotted with warlord Yuan Shao to assassinate the Ten Attendants, a clique of twelve eunuchs led by Zhang Rang who controlled much of the imperial court. He Jin also ordered Dong Zhuo, the frontier general in Liang Province, and Ding Yuan, Inspector of Bing Province, (Note: The area between present-day Baoding and Taiyuan) to bring troops to the capital to reinforce his position of authority. The eunuchs learned of He Jin's plot, and had him assassinated before Dong Zhuo reached the capital Luoyang. When Yuan Shao's troops reached Luoyang, they stormed the palace complex, killing the Ten Attendants and two thousand of the eunuchs' supporters. Though this move effectively ended the century-long feud between the eunuchs and the imperial family, this event prompted the invitation of Dong Zhuo to the outskirts of Luoyang from the northwest boundary of China.

On the evening of 24 September 189, General Dong Zhuo observed that Luoyang was set ablaze—as a result of a power struggle between the eunuchs and civil service—and commanded his army forward to strike down the disorder. As the emperor had lost any remaining military or political power, Dong Zhuo seized the de facto control of the government located at Luoyang. On 28 September, Dong Zhuo deposed Liu Bian from the imperial Han throne in favour of Liu Xie. In the following weeks, rebellions broke out throughout all of China.

In East China, in an attempt to restore the power of the Han, a large coalition against Dong Zhuo began to rise, with leaders such as Yuan Shao, Yuan Shu, and Cao Cao. Many provincial officials were compelled to join or risk elimination. In 191, Sun Jian (Yuan Shu's subordinate) led an army against Dong Zhuo and drove him from Luoyang to Chang'an. In the following year, Dong Zhuo's former bodyguard Lü Bu assassinated Dong Zhuo. It is said that Dong Zhuo's body was thrown into the street with a lit wick in his navel, which supposedly burned with the same brilliance of the sun for a period of four days.

=== Collapse of central power ===
In 192, there was some talk among the coalition of appointing Liu Yu, an imperial relative, as emperor, and gradually its members began to fall out. Most of the warlords in the coalition, with a few exceptions, sought the increase of personal military power in the time of instability instead of seriously wishing to restore the Han dynasty's authority. The Han empire was divided between a number of regional warlords. As a result of the complete collapse of the central government and eastern alliance, the North China Plain fell into warfare and anarchy with many contenders vying for success or survival. Emperor Xian fell into the hands of various warlords in Chang'an.

Dong Zhuo, confident in his success, was slain by his follower Lü Bu, who plotted with minister Wang Yun. Lü Bu, in turn, was attacked by Dong Zhuo's former officers: Li Jue, Guo Si, Zhang Ji and Fan Chou. Wang Yun and his whole family were executed. Lü Bu fled to Zhang Yang, a northern warlord, and remained with him for a time before briefly joining Yuan Shao, but it was clear that Lü Bu was far too independent to serve another. Yuan Shao operated from Ye city in Ji Province, extending his power north of the Yellow River. Han Fu had formerly been the Governor of Ji Province, but he came under the control of Yuan Shao and was replaced by him.

Between the Yellow and Huai rivers, a conflict had erupted between Yuan Shu, Cao Cao, Tao Qian (Governor of Xu Province) and Lü Bu. Cao Cao forced the Yellow Turbans to surrender in 192, drove Yuan Shu to the south of the Huai River in 193, inflicted devastation upon Tao Qian in 194, received the surrender of Liu Bei (then a commander under Tao Qian) in 196, and captured and executed Lü Bu in 198. Cao was now in complete control of the southern part of the North China Plain.

In the northeast, Gongsun Du held control of the Liaodong Peninsula and its environs, where he had established a state. He was succeeded by his son Gongsun Kang in 204. In the north across the frontier, the Southern Xiongnu vassal state had also collapsed, leading to the dispersion of their tribes and the rise of the Xiuchuge, while the Xianbei people of the steppe began migrating southward into China. Another Han vassal, the Wuhuan, were also growing in power in the northeast. Goguryeo was invaded by warlord Gongsun Kang in 204, resulting in the Daifang Commandery. In 209, Kang invaded Goguryeo again, took the capital of Goguryeo and forced them to submit. Goguryeo was forced to move its capital further east. In Liang Province (present-day Gansu), rebellion had erupted in 184. In the west, Liu Yan had been Governor of Yi Province since his appointment in 188. He was succeeded by his son Liu Zhang in 194. Directly north of Liu Zhang's territory, Zhang Lu, leader of the Five Pecks of Rice, led the theocratic government at Hanzhong commandery on the upper Han River. Liu Biao held control over his province as the Governor of Jing Province. Sun Quan held control over the lower Yangtze.

==== Xu and Yan provinces ====
In 194, Cao Cao went to war with Tao Qian of Xu Province, because Tao's subordinate Zhang Kai had murdered Cao Cao's father Cao Song. Tao Qian received the support of Liu Bei and Gongsun Zan, but even then it seemed as if Cao Cao's superior forces would overrun Xu Province entirely. Cao Cao received word that Lü Bu had seized Yan Province in his absence, and accordingly he retreated, putting a halt to hostilities with Tao Qian for the time being. Tao Qian died in the same year, leaving his province to Liu Bei. A year later, in 195, Cao Cao managed to drive Lü Bu out of Yan Province. Lü Bu fled to Xu Province and was received by Liu Bei, and an uneasy alliance began between the two.

Afterwards, Lü Bu betrayed Liu Bei and seized Xu Province, forming an alliance with Yuan Shu's remnant forces. Liu Bei, together with his followers Guan Yu and Zhang Fei, fled to Cao Cao, who accepted him. Soon, preparations were made for an attack on Lü Bu, and the combined forces of Cao Cao and Liu Bei invaded Xu Province. Lü Bu's men deserted him, Yuan Shu's forces never arrived as reinforcements, and he was bound by his own subordinates and executed on Cao Cao's order.

==== Huai River ====
Yuan Shu, after being driven south in 193, established himself at his new capital Shouchun (present-day Anhui). He attempted to regain lost territory north of the Huai River. In 197, Yuan Shu declared himself emperor of his own dynasty. The move was a strategic blunder, as it drew the ire of many warlords across the land, including Yuan Shu's own subordinates who almost all abandoned him. Abandoned by almost all his allies and followers, he perished in 199.

==== Emperor Xian's fate ====
In August 195, Emperor Xian fled the tyranny of Li Jue at Chang'an and made a year long hazardous journey east in search of supporters. In 196, Emperor Xian came under the protection and control of Cao Cao after he had succeeded in fleeing from the warlords of Chang'an. Establishing the imperial court at Xuchang in Henan, Cao Cao—who now held the de facto control—rigorously followed the formalities of the court and justified his actions as a loyal minister of the Han. By then, most of the smaller contenders for power had either been absorbed by larger ones or destroyed. This was an extremely important move for Cao Cao following the suggestion from his primary adviser, Xun Yu, commenting that by supporting the authentic emperor, Cao Cao would have the formal legal authority to control the other warlords and force them to comply in order to restore the Han dynasty.

==== North China Plain ====
Cao Cao, whose zone of control was the precursor to the state of Cao Wei, had raised an army in 189. In several strategic movements and battles, he controlled Yan Province and defeated several factions of the Yellow Turban rebels. This earned him the aid of other local militaries controlled by Zhang Miao and Chen Gong, who joined his cause to create his first sizeable army. He continued the effort and absorbed approximately 300,000 Yellow Turban rebels into his army as well as a number of clan-based military groups from the eastern part of Qing Province. Since 192, he developed military agricultural colonies (tuntian) to support his army. Although the system imposed a heavy tax on hired civilian farmers (40% to 60% of agricultural production), the farmers were more than pleased to be able to work with relative stability and professional military protection in a time of chaos. This was later said to be his second important policy for success.

In 200, Dong Cheng, an imperial relative, received a secret edict from Emperor Xian to assassinate Cao Cao. He collaborated with Liu Bei on this effort, but Cao Cao soon found out about the plot and had Dong Cheng and his conspirators executed, with only Liu Bei surviving and fleeing to join Yuan Shao in the north. After settling the nearby provinces, including a rebellion led by former Yellow Turbans, and internal affairs with the court, Cao Cao turned his attention north to Yuan Shao, who himself had eliminated his northern rival Gongsun Zan that same year. Yuan Shao, himself of higher nobility than Cao Cao, amassed a large army and camped along the northern bank of the Yellow River. In the summer of 200, after months of preparations, the armies of Cao Cao and Yuan Shao clashed at the Battle of Guandu (near present-day Kaifeng). Cao Cao's army was heavily outnumbered by Yuan Shao. Due to a raid in Yuan's supply train, Yuan's army fell into disorder as they fled back north.

Cao Cao took advantage of Yuan Shao's death in 202, which resulted in division among his sons, and advanced to the north. In 204, after the Battle of Ye, Cao Cao captured the city of Ye. By the end of 207, after a victorious campaign beyond the frontier against the Wuhuan culminating in the Battle of White Wolf Mountain, Cao Cao achieved complete dominance of the North China Plain. He now controlled China's heartland, including Yuan Shao's former territory, and half of the Chinese population.

==== South of the Yangtze ====
In 193, Huang Zu led the forces of Liu Biao in a campaign against Sun Jian (Yuan Shu's subordinate general) and killed him. In 194, Sun Ce (aged 18) came into the military service under Yuan Shu. He was given the command of some troops who formerly had been commanded by his late father Sun Jian. In the south, he defeated the warlords of Yang Province, including Liu Yao, Wang Lang, and Yan Baihu.

In 198, Sun Ce (aged 23) declared his independence from Yuan Shu who recently had declared himself emperor. He held control over Danyang, Wu, and Kuaiji commanderies (from present-day Nanjing to the Hangzhou Bay, and some outposts at the Fujian coast), while expanding westward in a series of campaigns. By 200, he had conquered Yuzhang commandery (at present-day Lake Poyang in Jiangxi) and Lujiang north of the Yangtze. In 200, Sun Ce was ambushed and assassinated by the former retainers of a defeated rival from Wu. At 18, Sun Quan succeeded him and quickly established his authority. By 203, he was expanding westward. In 208, Sun Quan defeated Huang Zu (Liu Biao's subordinate commander) around present-day Wuhan. He now held control over the territories south of the Yangtze (below Wuhan, Poyang region, and Hangzhou Bay). His navy established local superiority over the Yangtze. Nevertheless, he would soon come under the threat of Cao Cao's larger armies.

==== Jing Province ====
During Dong Zhuo's reign over the Han government, Liu Biao had been appointed as the governor of Jing Province. His territory was located around his capital Xiangyang and the territory to the south around the Han and Yangtze River. Beyond his eastern border was the territory of Sun Quan.

In 200, during the time of the campaign around Guandu between Cao Cao and Yuan Shao, Liu Bei's forces had been defeated by a detachment of Cao Cao's army, forcing Liu Bei to flee and seek refuge with Liu Biao in Jing Province. In this exile, Liu Bei maintained his followers who had accompanied him and made new connections within Liu Biao's entourage. It was during this time that Liu Bei also met Zhuge Liang.

In the autumn of 208, Liu Biao died and was succeeded by his youngest son Liu Cong over the eldest son Liu Qi through political manoeuvring. Liu Bei had become the head of the opposition to a surrender when Cao Cao's army marched southward to Jing. After the advice of his supporters, Liu Cong surrendered to Cao Cao. Cao Cao took control of the province and began appointing scholars and officials from Liu Biao's court to the local government. Meanwhile, Liu Qi had joined Liu Bei to establish a line of defence at the Yangtze River against the surrender to Cao Cao, but they suffered defeat at the hands of Cao Cao. In the aftermath, they retreated and sought support from Sun Quan. Guan Yu (Liu Bei's subordinate lieutenant) had managed to retrieve most of Jing Province's fleet from the Han River. Cao Cao occupied the naval base at Jiangling on the Yangtze River. He would now begin proceeding eastwards towards Sun Quan with his armies and new fleet, while sending messengers to demand Sun Quan's surrender.

==== Battle of Red Cliffs ====
In 208, Cao Cao marched south with his army hoping to quickly unify the empire. Liu Cong surrendered Jing Province, and Cao Cao was able to capture a sizeable fleet at Jiangling. Sun Quan continued to resist; his advisor Lu Su secured an alliance with Liu Bei, himself a recent refugee from the north, and Zhou Yu was placed in command of Sun Quan's navy, along with a veteran general who served the Sun family, Cheng Pu. Liu Biao's second son, Liu Qi, joined the alliance with his troops, and the combined armies of 50,000 met Cao Cao's fleet and 200,000-man force at Red Cliffs that winter. After an initial skirmish, an attack was set in motion beginning with a plan to set fire to Cao Cao's immobilised fleet through the feigned surrender of Sun Quan's general Huang Gai. Cao Cao was defeated decisively and forced to retreat in disarray back to the north. The allied victory at Red Cliffs ensured the survival of Liu Bei and Sun Quan, and provided the basis for the states of Shu and Wu.

=== Final years of the dynasty ===
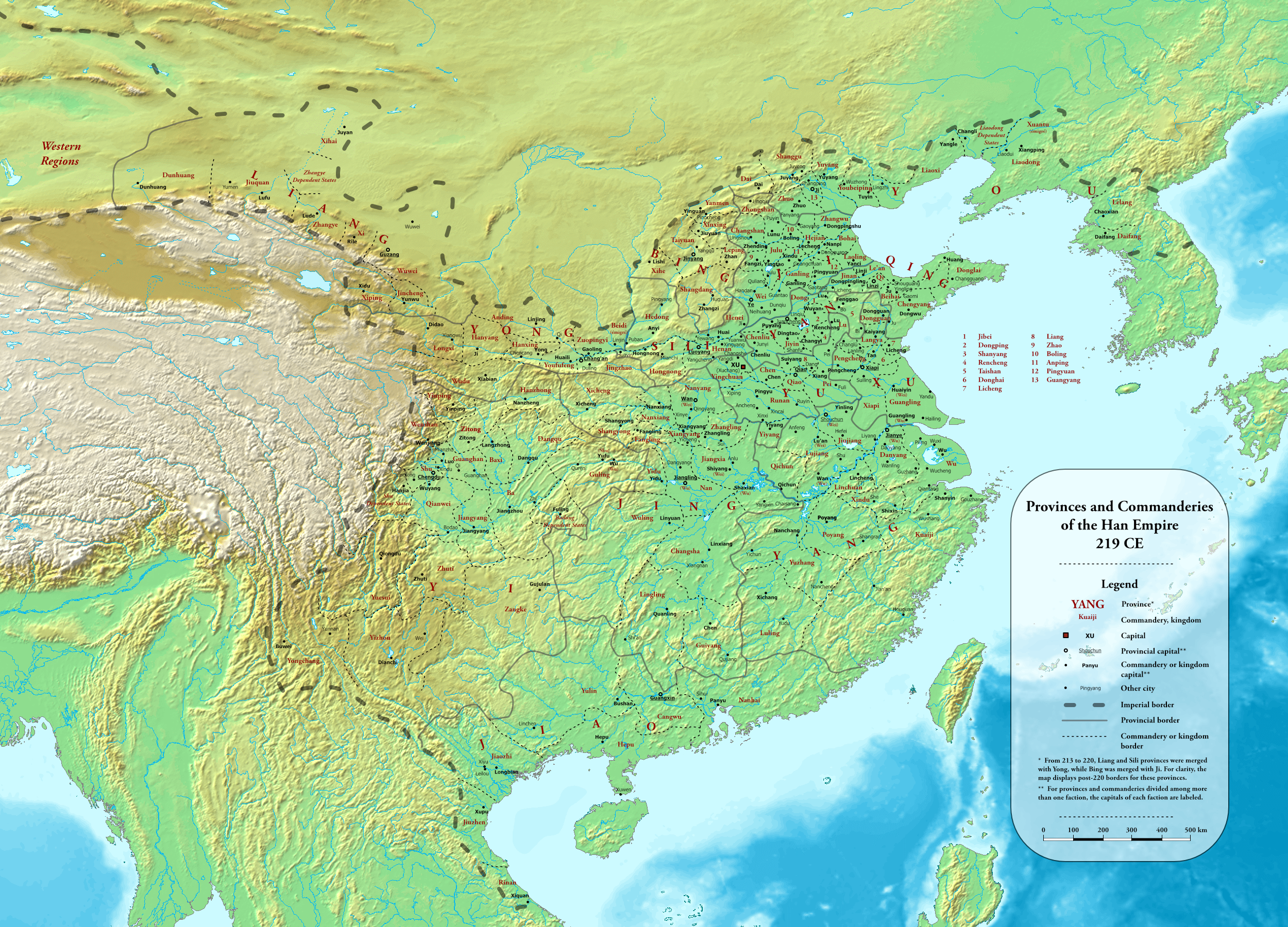
Provinces and commanderies in the penultimate year of the Han dynasty (219 AD)

In 209, Zhou Yu captured Jiangling, establishing the south's complete dominance over the Yangtze River. Meanwhile, Liu Bei and his principal adviser Zhuge Liang captured the Xiang River basin commanderies, establishing control over the southern territories of Jing province. Sun Quan was forced to cede the territory around Jiangling to Liu Bei, because he could not establish a proper authority over it after Zhou Yu's death in 210.

In 211, Cao Cao defeated a warlord coalition in the Wei valley, ending in the Battle of Huayin, capturing the territory around Chang'an. In 211, Liu Bei accepted an invitation from Liu Zhang to come to Yi Province for aiding the latter against a threat from the north, namely Zhang Lu of Hanzhong. Liu Bei met people within Liu Zhang's court who wished that he would replace Liu Zhang as the ruler of Yi Province. A year after his arrival, Liu Bei came into conflict with Liu Zhang and turned against him. In the summer of 214, Liu Bei received the surrender of Liu Zhang, capturing Yi Province, and established his regime at Chengdu. In 215, Cao Cao captured Hanzhong after attacking and receiving the surrender of Zhang Lu. He had launched the attack from Chang'an through the Qinling Mountain passes to Hanzhong. The conquest threatened Liu Bei's territory located directly to the south. Cao Cao progressively acquired additional titles and power under the puppet Emperor Xian. He became the Chancellor in 208, the Duke of Wei in 214, and the King of Wei in 217. He also compelled Sun Quan to accept suzerainty to Wei, but it had no real effect in practice.

After Liu Bei had captured Yi Province from Liu Zhang in 214, Sun Quan—who had been engaged with Cao Cao in the southeast at the region between the Huai and Yangtze rivers during the intervening years—turned his attention to the middle Yangtze. Cao Cao and Sun Quan had gained no success in breaking each other's positions. Liu Fu, an administrator under Cao Cao, had established agricultural garrisons at Hefei and Shouchun to defend Cao's territory near the Huai river. Sun Quan resented the fact that Liu Bei, a weaker ally, had gained so much territory west of him and demanded a larger share of the Xiang River basin. In 215, Lü Meng (Sun Quan's officer) was sent to capture Jing province's southern commanderies, but Guan Yu (Liu Bei's general) launched a counterattack. Later that year, Liu Bei and Sun Quan reached a settlement that the Xiang River would serve as the border between their territories. In the south, Sun Quan had sent He Qin, Lu Xun, and others to expand and conquer territory in what are now southern Zhejiang and Fujian.

In 219, Liu Bei seized Hanzhong by defeating and killing General Xiahou Yuan, who served Cao Cao. Cao Cao sent reinforcements in an unsuccessful attempt to reclaim the territory. Liu Bei had now secured his territory against the north and declared himself the King of Hanzhong. In the east, Sun Quan attempted to capture Hefei from Cao Cao, but he did not succeed.

While Lu Su had been chief commander for Sun Quan in Jing Province, their policy was to maintain the alliance with Liu Bei while Cao Cao was still a threat. This changed when Sun Quan appointed Lü Meng when Lu Su died in 217. In 219, Guan Yu sailed from Jiangling up the Han River towards the city of Fan (near Xianyang), but was unable to capture it. In the autumn of 219, Lü Meng launched a surprise attack by sailing up the Yangtze towards Jiangling, resulting in its capture. Guan Yu was unable to hold his position as most of his army surrendered. He was captured and executed on Sun Quan's order. Cao Cao regained the Han valley, while Sun Quan captured all the territory east of the Yangtze Gorges.

== Emergence of the Three Kingdoms ==
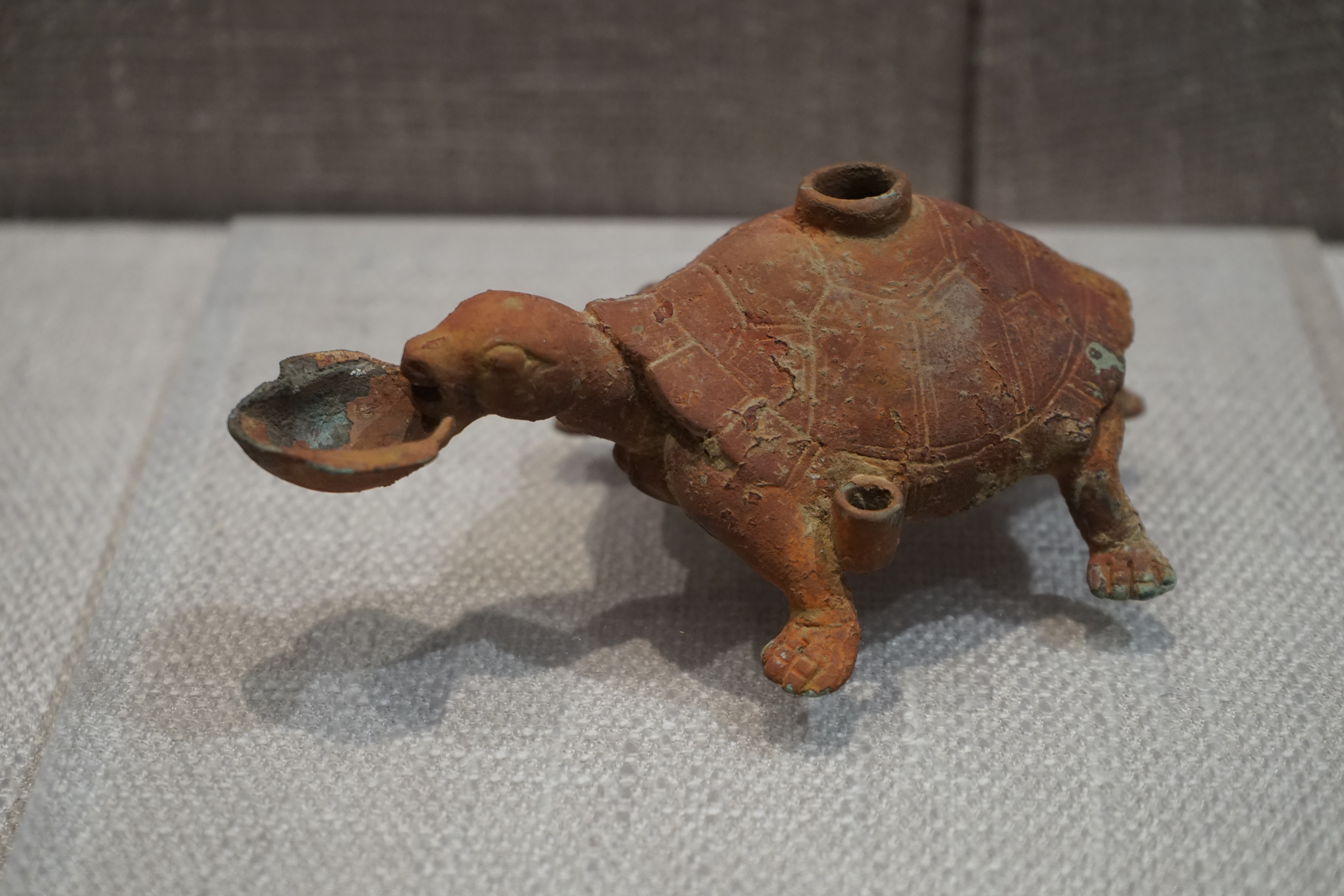
Bronze turtle holding a cup, Eastern Wu

At the beginning of 220, Cao Cao died and was succeeded by his son Cao Pi. On 11 December, Emperor Xian abdicated and Cao Pi ascended the imperial throne by proclaiming his heavenly mandate as the Emperor of Wei. On 15 May 221, Liu Bei responded by proclaiming himself as the Emperor of Han. His state would become generally known as Shu Han. Sun Quan continued to recognise his de jure suzerainty to Wei and was enfeoffed as the King of Wu.

At the end of 221, Shu invaded Wu in response for Guan Yu's killing and the loss of Jing Province by Wu. In the spring of 222, Liu Bei arrived at the scene to personally take command of the invasion. Sun Quan dispatched Lu Xun to command over the defence of Wu against the invasion by Shu. Against the advice of his subordinates, Lu Xun waited until Liu Bei was committed along the Yangtze below the Yangtze Gorges. Finally, in the sixth month of 222, Lu Xun launched a series of fire attacks against the flank of Liu Bei's extended position which caused disorder in the Shu army and Liu Bei's retreat to Baidi (near present-day Fengjie). Afterwards in 222, Sun Quan renounced his suzerainty to Wei and declared the independence of Wu. In 223, Liu Bei perished at Baidi. Zhuge Liang now acted as a regent for the 17-year-old Liu Shan, and held control of the Shu government. Shu and Wu resumed their diplomatic relations by re-establishing peace and alliance in the winter of 223. On 23 June 229, Sun Quan proclaimed himself as the Emperor of Wu.

Shu controlled the upper Han valley and the territory west of the Yangtze Gorges. The Qinling Mountains divided Shu and Wei. Wei held control over the Wei and Huai valley, where agricultural garrisons were established at Shouchun and Hefei to defend Huai. Military sorties by Wu against Hefei and Shouchun would consistently end in failure, thereby confirming Wei's hold over Huai. Wu controlled all of the Yangtze valley. The territory between the Huai and Yangtze was a desolate area, where a largely-static frontier between Wei and Wu had formed at the lower Han valley.

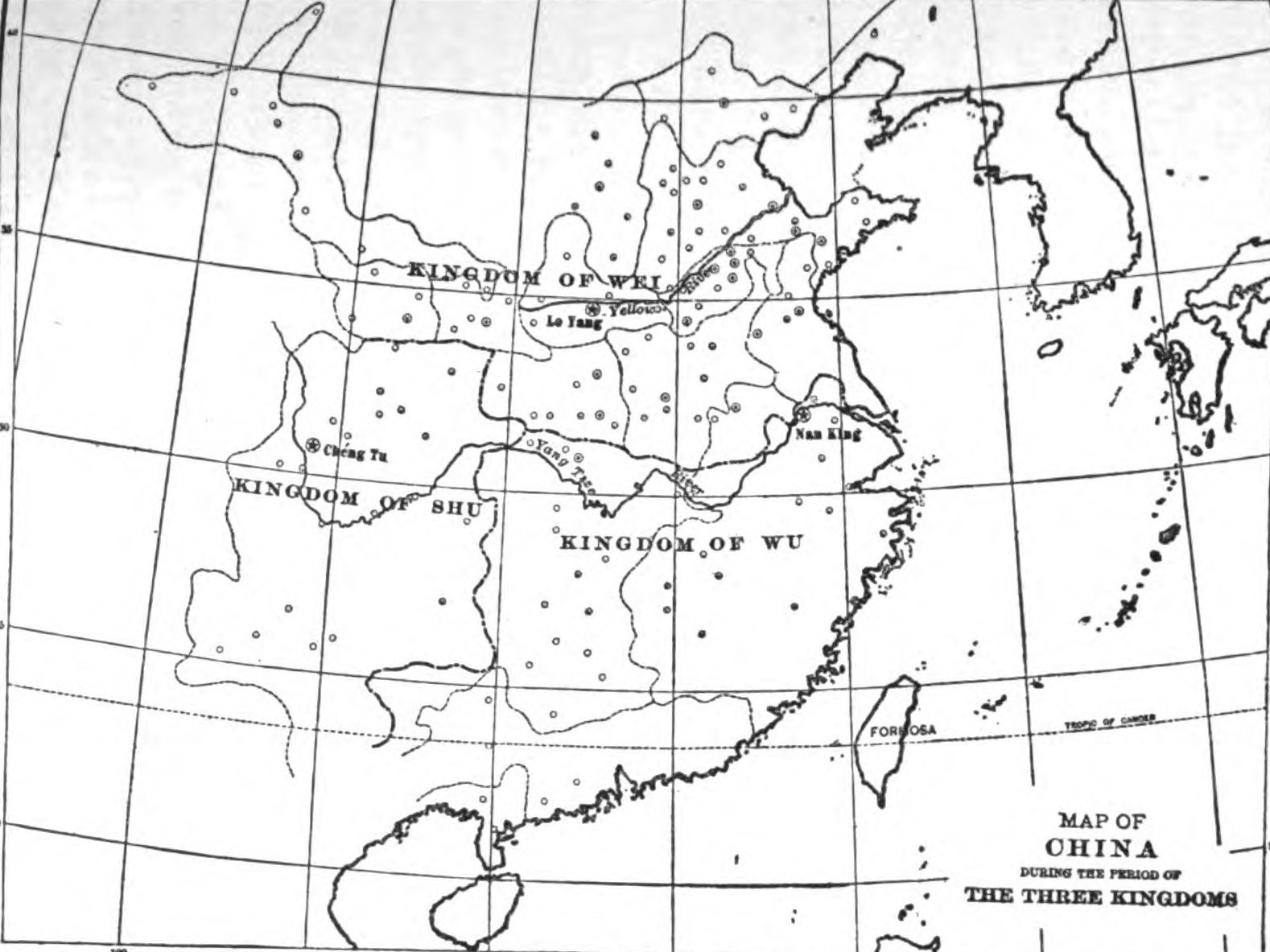
Map of the Three Kingdoms

=== Shu ===
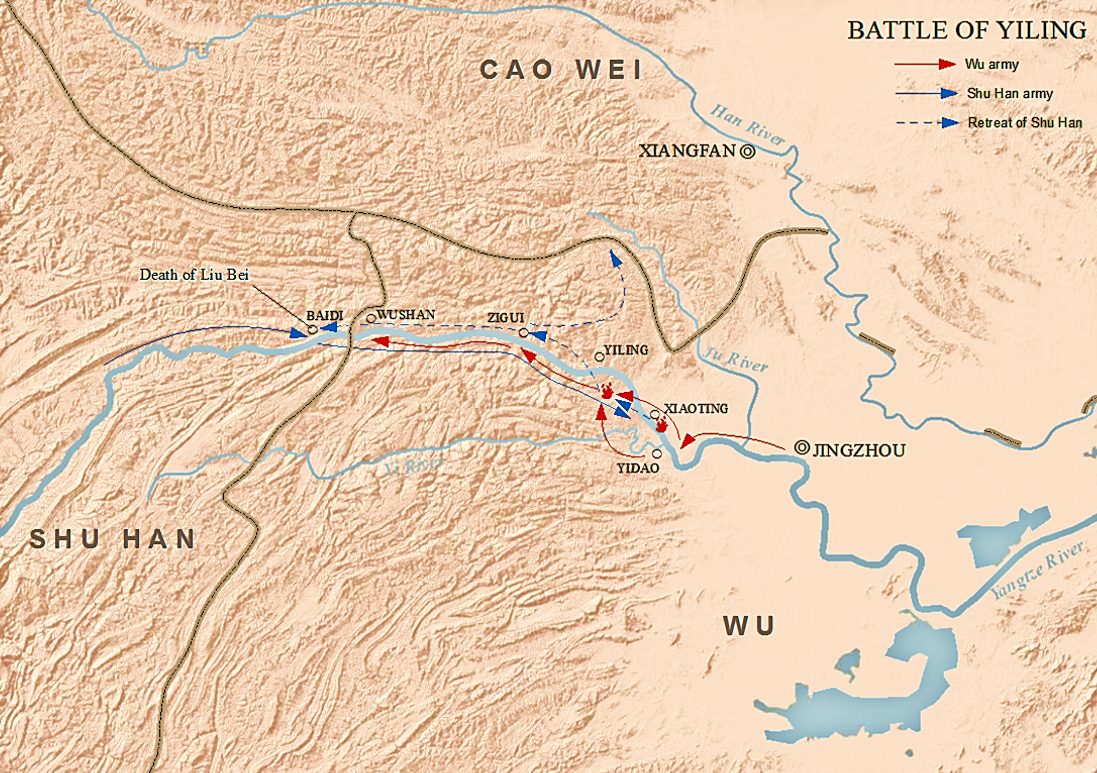
Map showing Battle of Yiling between Shu Han and Wu kingdoms.

In 223, Liu Shan rose to the throne of Shu following his father's defeat and death. From 224 to 225, during his southward campaigns, Zhuge Liang conquered the southern territories up to Lake Dian in Yunnan.

In 227, Zhuge Liang transferred his main Shu armies to Hanzhong, and opened up the battle for the northwest with Wei. The next year, he ordered Zhao Yun to attack from Ji Gorge as a diversion while Zhuge himself led the main force to Mount Qi. The vanguard Ma Su suffered a tactical defeat at Jieting and the Shu army was forced to withdraw. In the next six years Zhuge Liang attempted several more offensives, but supply problems limited the capacity for success. In 234, he led his last great northern offensive, reaching the Battle of Wuzhang Plains south of the Wei River. Due to the death of Zhuge Liang in 234, the Shu army was forced once again to withdraw, but were pursued by Wei. The Shu forces began to withdraw; Sima Yi deduced Zhuge Liang's demise and ordered an attack. Shu struck back almost immediately, causing Sima Yi to second guess and allow Shu to withdraw successfully.

=== Wu ===
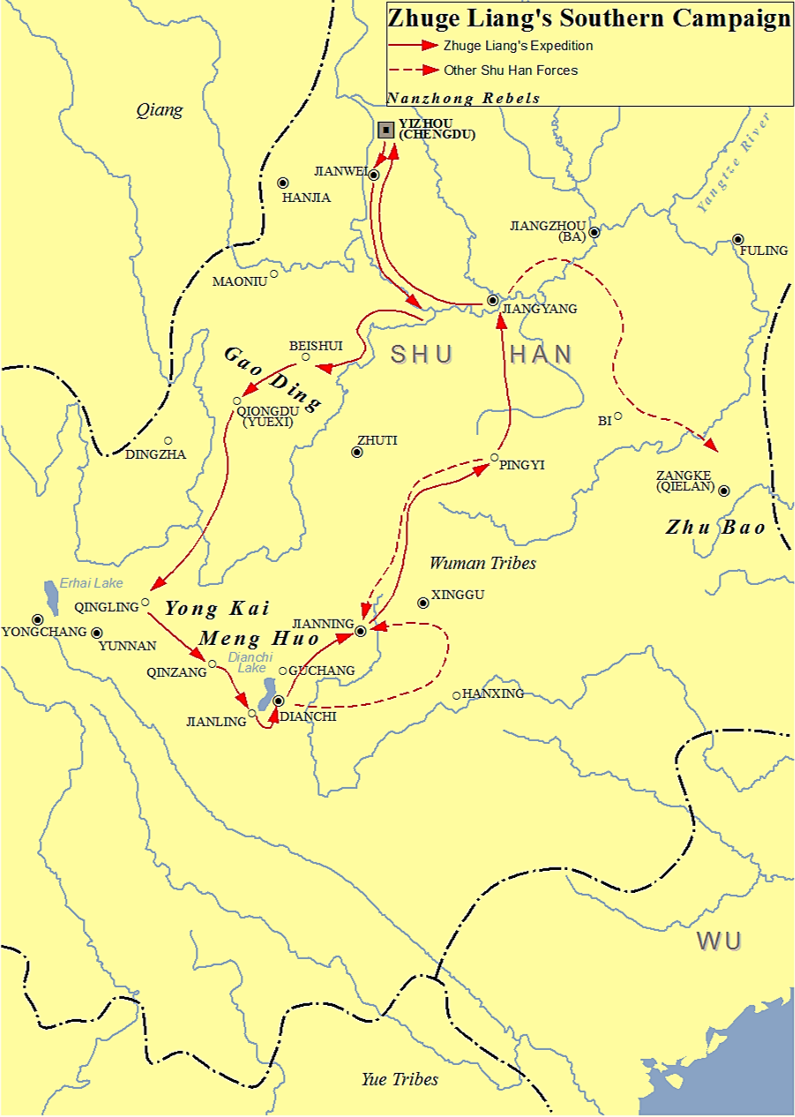
Zhuge Liang's Southern Campaign

Sun Quan turned to the aborigines of the southeast, whom the Chinese collectively called the Shanyue. A collection of successes against the rebellious tribesmen culminated in the victory of 224. In that year, Zhuge Ke ended a three-year siege of Danyang with the surrender of 100,000 Shanyue. Of these, 40,000 were drafted as auxiliaries into the Wu army. Meanwhile, Shu was also experiencing troubles with the indigenous tribes of their south. The southwestern Nanman peoples rose in revolt against Shu authority, captured and looted cities in Yi Province. Zhuge Liang, recognising the importance of stability in the south, ordered the advance of the Shu armies in three columns against the Nanman. He fought a number of engagements against the chieftain Meng Huo, at the end of which Meng Huo submitted. A tribesman was allowed to reside at the Shu capital Chengdu as an official and the Nanman formed their own battalions within the Shu army.

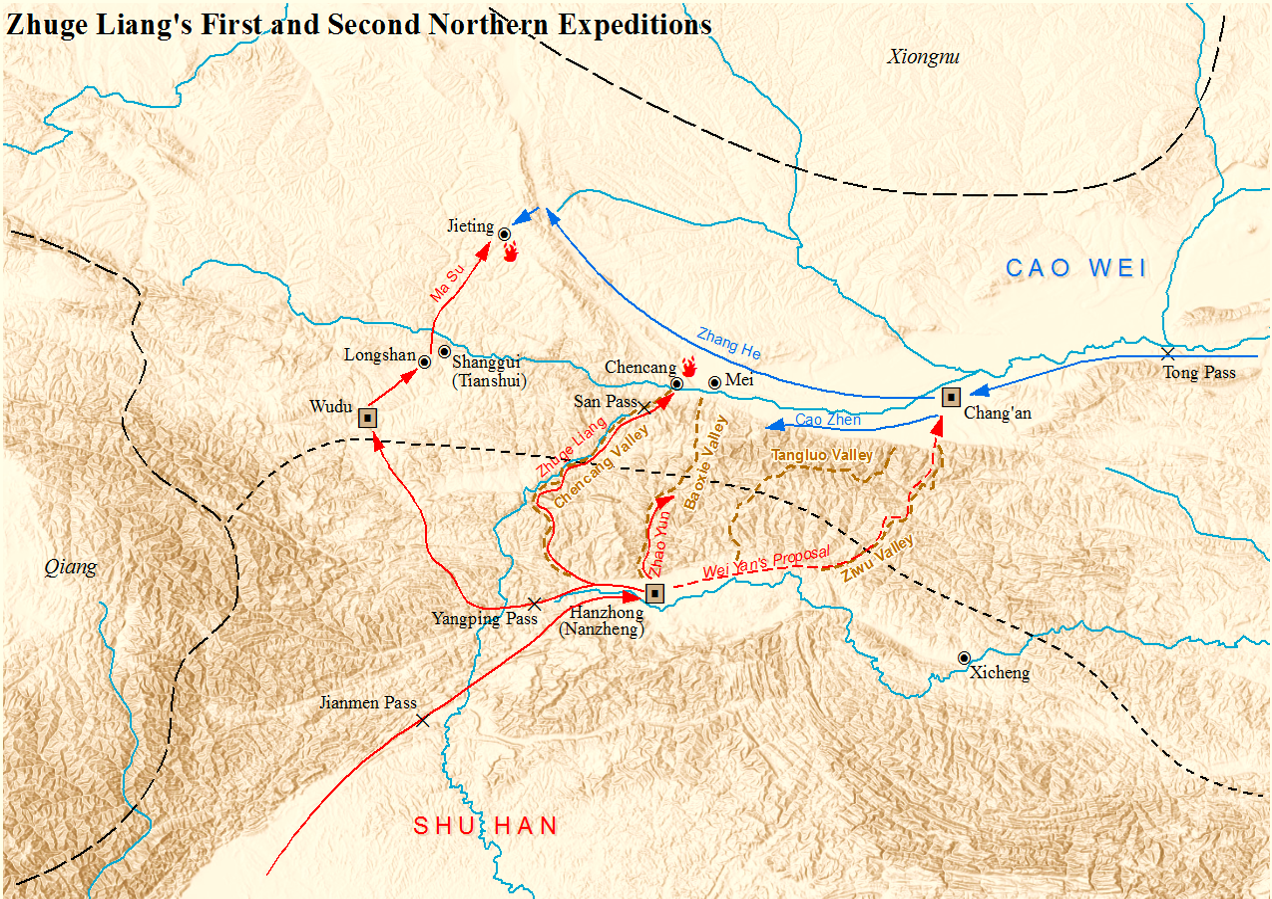
Zhuge Liang's first and second northern expeditions against Cao Wei

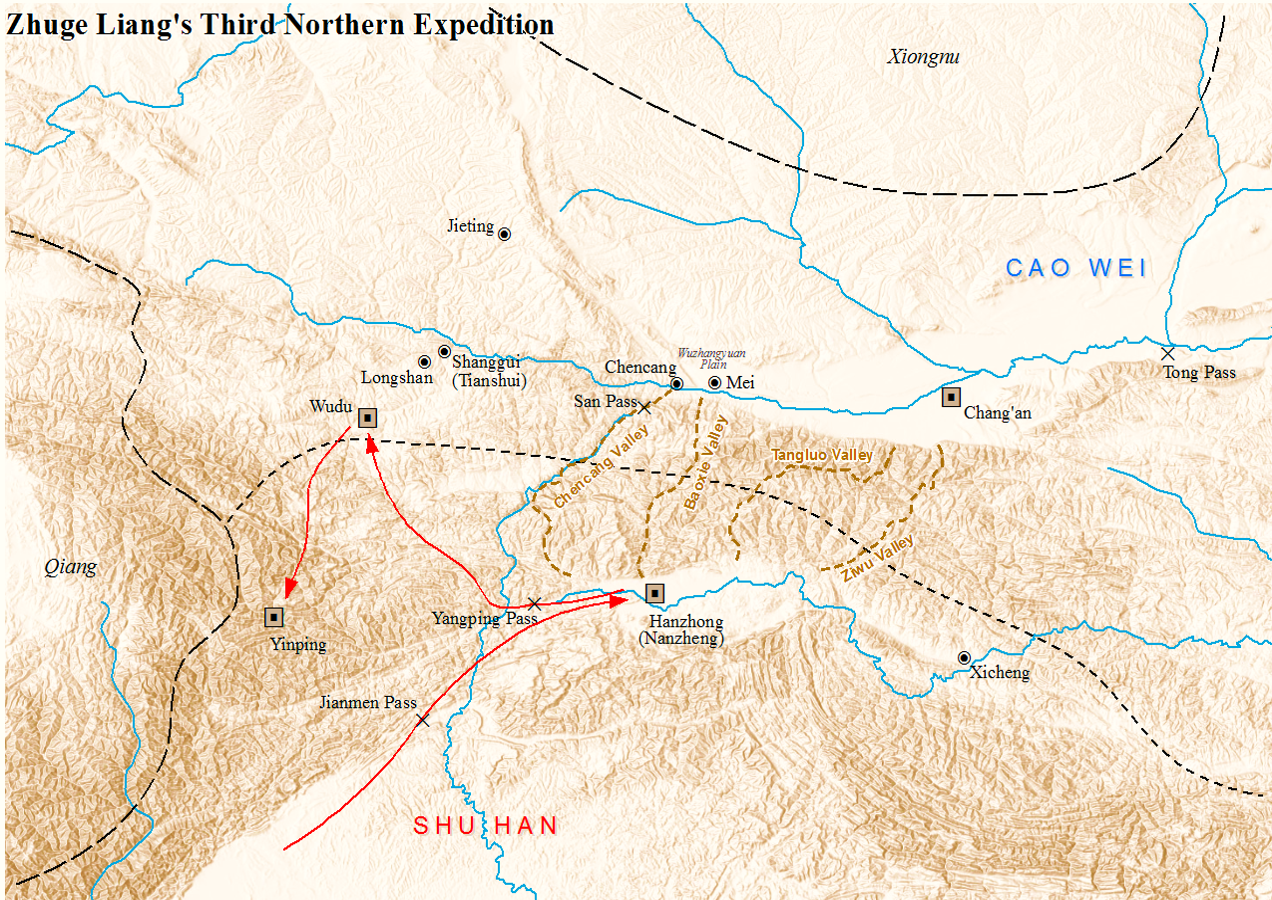
Zhuge Liang's third northern expedition against Cao Wei

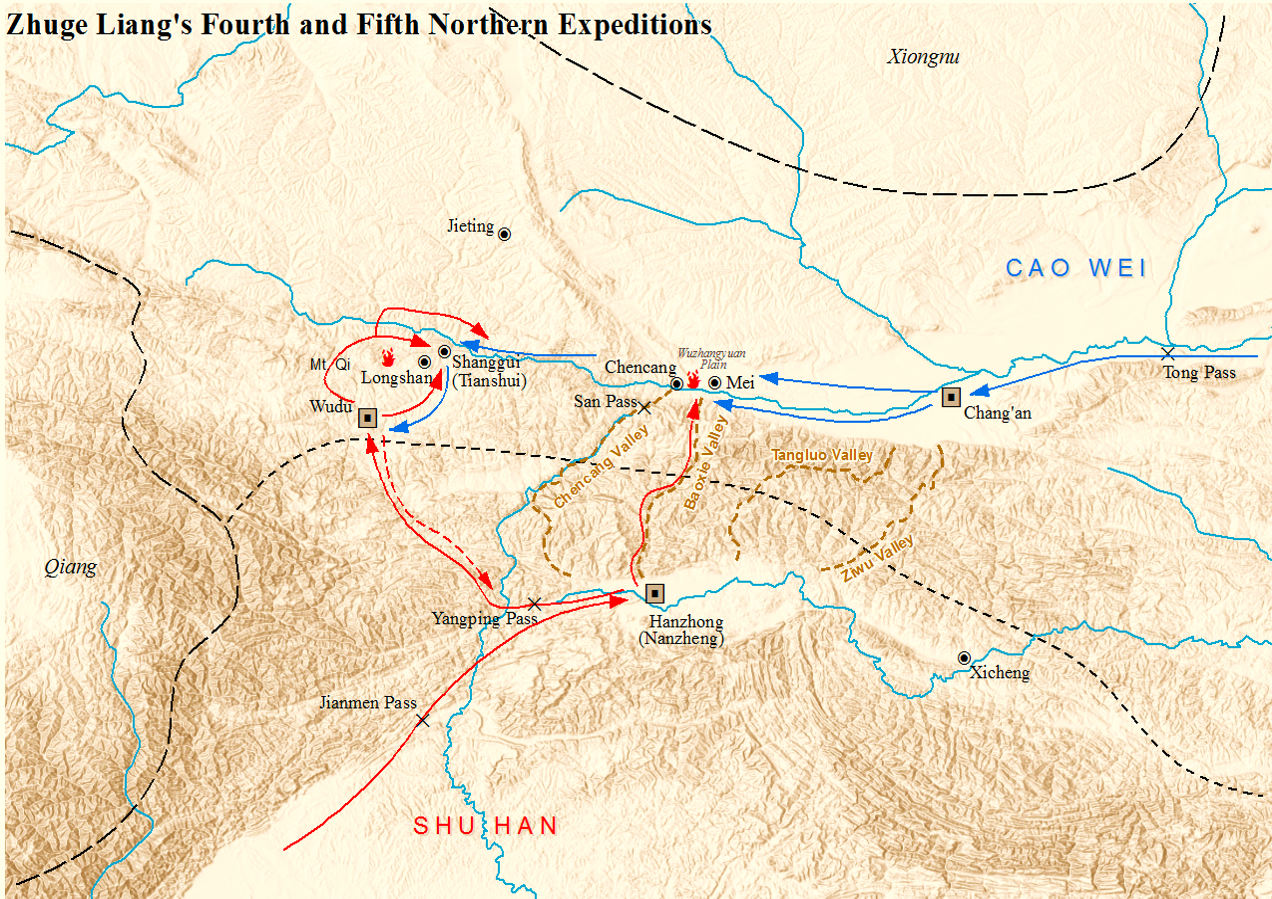
Zhuge Liang's fourth and fifth northern expeditions against Cao Wei

In the times of Zhuge Liang's northern offensives, the state of Wu had always been on the defensive against invasions from the north. The area around Hefei was the scene of many bitter battles and under constant pressure from Wei after the Battle of Red Cliffs. Warfare had grown so intense that many of the residents chose to migrate and resettle south of the Yangtze. After Zhuge Liang's death, attacks on the southern Huai River region intensified but nonetheless, Wei could not break through the line of the river defences erected by Wu, which included the Ruxu fortress.

Sun Quan's long reign is regarded as a time of plenty for his southern state. Migrations from the north and the settlement of the Shanyue increased manpower for agriculture, especially along the lower reaches of the Yangtze and in Kuaiji Commandery along the southern shore of Hangzhou Bay. River transport blossomed, with the construction of the Zhedong and Jiangnan canals. Trade with Shu flourished, with a huge influx of Shu cotton and the development of celadon and metal industries. Sea journeys were made to Liaodong and the island of Yizhou (probably modern Ryukyus or Taiwan). In the south, Wu merchants reached Linyi (southern Vietnam) and Funan Kingdom. As the economy prospered, so too did the arts and culture. In the Yangtze delta, the first Buddhist influences reached the south from Luoyang.

The Eastern Wu era was a formative period in Vietnamese history. A Jiaozhou (modern Vietnam and Guangzhou) prefect, Shi Xie, ruled Vietnam as an autonomous warlord for forty years and was posthumously deified by later Vietnamese emperors. Shi Xie pledged loyalty to Eastern Wu. Originally satisfied with Eastern Wu's rule, the Vietnamese opposed Shi Hui's rebellion against Eastern Wu and attacked him for it. However, when the Wu general Lü Dai betrayed Shi Hui and executed the entire Shi family, the Vietnamese became greatly upset. In 248, the people of Jiaozhi and Jiuzhen commanderies rebelled. Eastern Wu sent Lu Yin to deal with the rebels. He managed to pacify the rebels with a combination of threats and persuasion. However the rebels regrouped under the leadership of Lady Triệu in Jiuzhen and renewed the rebellion with a march on Jiaozhi. After several months of warfare she was defeated and committed suicide.

=== Wei ===
In 226, Cao Pi died at the age of 40, and was succeeded by his eldest son Cao Rui (aged 22) Minister Chen Qun, General Cao Zhen, General Cao Xiu, and General Sima Yi (Note: Earlier, in 217, Sima Yi had become a member of the heir apparent Cao Pi's entourage. He steadily rose in position during Cao Pi's reign. (Crespigny 1991,31)) were appointed as regents, even though Cao Rui was able to manage the government in practice. Eventually the former three died, leaving only Sima Yi as the senior minister and military commander. In 226, Sima Yi successfully defended Xiangyang against an offensive from Wu; this battle was the first time he had command in the field. In 227, Sima Yi was appointed to a post at Chang'an where he managed the military affairs along the Han River.

On the northern frontiers, the remnants of the Southern Xiongnu had been reorganized into the Five Divisions in modern-day Shanxi by Cao Cao in 216 and continued to serve as auxiliaries for the Wei. The Xianbei of the steppe were also migrating in large groups into the Chinese interior. Particularly in the northeast, where the Wuhuan was defeated by Cao Cao, the Xianbei tribes offered their submissions and became vassals to the Chinese court. The power vacuum left behind by the Wuhuan was filled by the Xianbei, and the Wuhuan gradually assimilated with the Xianbei and Han Chinese. One Xianbei chieftain, Kebineng, was among the earliest to submit, but by 224, his forces had grown considerably and began to harass Wei's borders before he was assassinated in 235.

In 238, Sima Yi was dispatched to command a military campaign against Gongsun Yuan of the self-proclaimed the Yan Kingdom in Liaodong, resulting in Sima Yi's capture of his capital Xiangping and massacre of his government. Between 244 and 245, General Guanqiu Jian was dispatched to invade Goguryeo and severely devastated that state. The northeastern frontier of Wei was now secured from any possible threats. The invasions, a retaliation against a Goguryeo raid in 242, destroyed the Goguryeo capital of Hwando, sent its king fleeing, and broke the tributary relationships between Goguryeo and the other tribes of Korea that formed much of Goguryeo's economy. Although the king evaded capture and eventually settled in a new capital, Goguryeo was reduced to such insignificance that for half a century there was no mention of the state in Chinese historical texts.

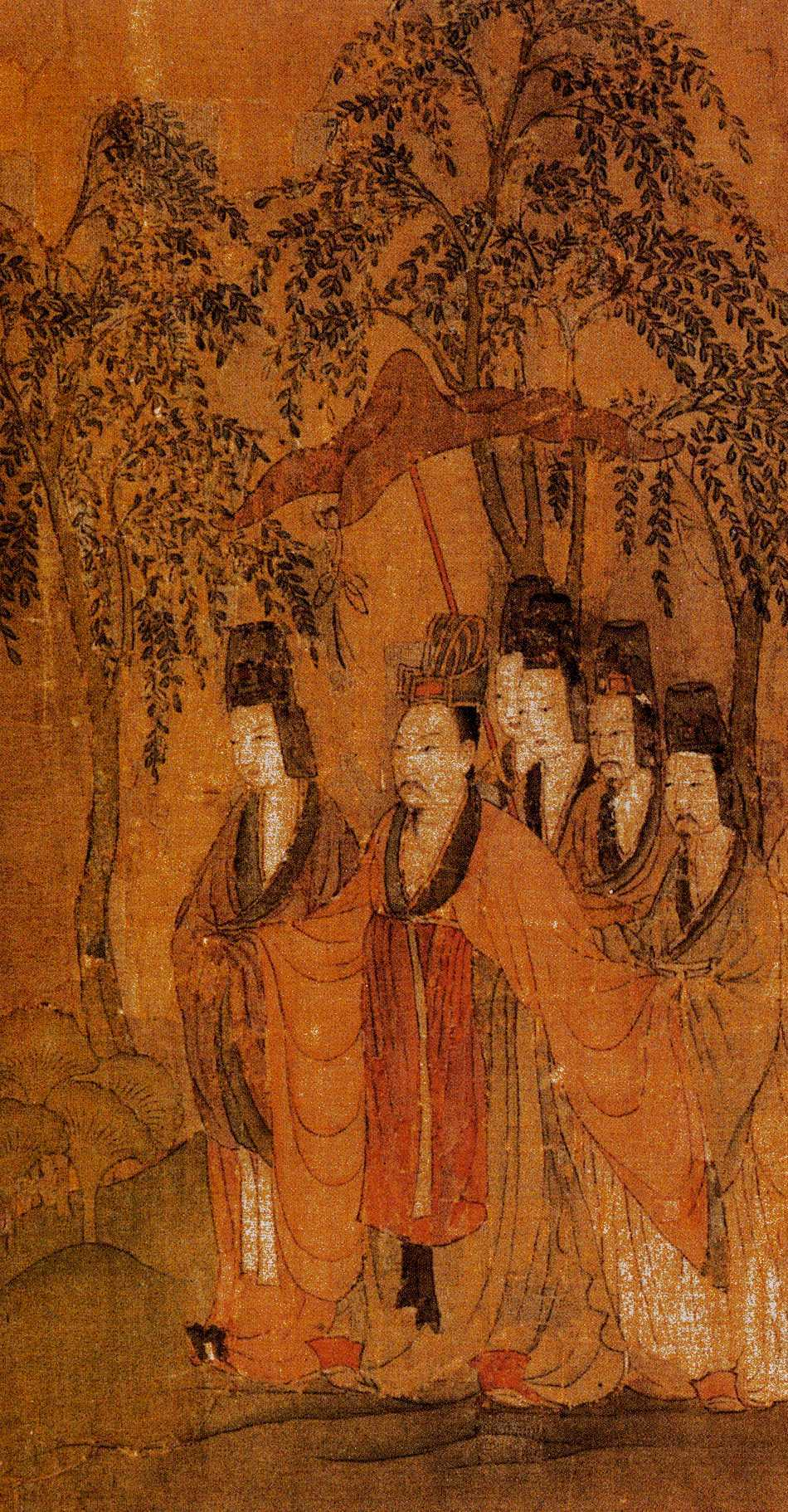
Cao Zhi as depicted in Goddess of Luo River (detail) by Gu Kaizhi

In 238, Cao Rui perished at age 35. He was succeeded by his adopted son Cao Fang (aged 7), who was a close member of the imperial family. Cao Rui had appointed Cao Shuang and Sima Yi to be Cao Fang's regents, even though he had contemplated to establish a regency council dominated by imperial family members. Cao Shuang held the principal control over the court. Meanwhile, Sima Yi was received the honorific title of Grand Tutor, but had virtually no influence at the court.

== Decline ==
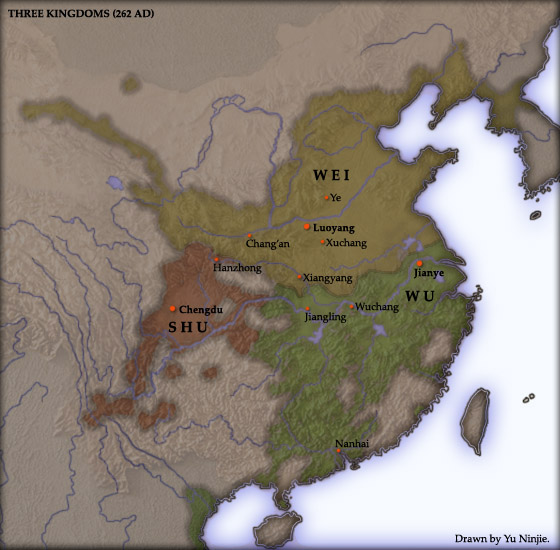
Three Kingdoms in 262, on the eve of the conquest of Shu, Wei and Wu

=== Fall of Shu ===
After Zhuge Liang's death, his position as chancellor fell to Jiang Wan, Fei Yi and Dong Yun, in that order. But after 258, Shu politics became increasingly controlled by the eunuch faction, led by Huang Hao, and corruption rose. Despite the energetic efforts of Jiang Wei, Zhuge Liang's protégé, Shu was unable to secure any decisive achievement. In 263, Wei launched a three-pronged attack and the Shu army was forced into general retreat from Hanzhong. Jiang Wei hurriedly held a position at Jiange but he was outflanked by the Wei commander Deng Ai, who force-marched his army from Yinping through territory formerly considered impassable. By the winter of the year, the capital Chengdu fell due to the strategic invasion of Wei by Deng Ai who invaded Chengdu personally. The emperor Liu Shan thus surrendered. The state of Shu had come to an end after 43 years. Liu Shan was reinstated to the Wei capital of Luoyang and was given the new title of the "Duke of Anle". Directly translated, it meant the "Duke of Safety and Happiness" and was a trivial position with no actual power.

=== Fall of Wei ===
From the late 230s, tensions began to become visible between the imperial Cao clan and the Sima clan. Following the death of Cao Zhen, factionalism was evident between Cao Shuang and the Grand Tutor Sima Yi. In deliberations, Cao Shuang placed his own supporters in important posts and excluded Sima Yi, whom he regarded as a dangerous threat. The power of the Sima clan, one of the great landowning families of the Han dynasty, was bolstered by Sima Yi's military victories. Additionally, Sima Yi was an extremely capable strategist and politician. In 238 he crushed Gongsun Yuan's self-proclaimed Yan Kingdom and brought the Liaodong region directly under Wei control. Ultimately, he outmanoeuvred Cao Shuang in power play. Taking advantage of an excursion by the imperial clansmen to the Gaoping Tombs, Sima Yi carried out a putsch in Luoyang, forcing Cao Shuang's faction from authority. Many protested against the overwhelming power of the Sima family; notable among these were the Seven Sages of the Bamboo Grove. One of the sages, Xi Kang, was executed as part of the purges after Cao Shuang's downfall.

Cao Huan succeeded to the throne in 260 after Cao Mao was killed in a failed coup against Sima Zhao. Soon after, Sima Zhao died and his title as Duke of Jìn was inherited by his son Sima Yan. Sima Yan immediately began plotting to become emperor but faced stiff opposition. Following advice from his advisors, Cao Huan decided the best course of action would be to abdicate, unlike his predecessor Cao Mao. Sima Yan seized the throne in 266 after forcing Cao Huan's abdication, effectively overthrowing the Wei dynasty and establishing the successor Jin dynasty. This situation was similar to the deposal of Emperor Xian of Han by Cao Pi 40 years earlier.

=== Fall of Wu ===
Following Sun Quan's death and the ascension of the young Sun Liang to the throne in 252, the state of Wu went into steady decline. Successful Wei suppression of rebellions in the southern Huai River region by Sima Zhao and Sima Shi reduced any opportunity of Wu influence. The fall of Shu signalled a change in Wei politics. After Liu Shan surrendered to Wei, Sima Yan (grandson of Sima Yi), overthrew the Wei emperor and proclaimed his own dynasty of Jin in 266, ending 46 years of Cao dominion in the north. After Jin's rise, emperor Sun Xiu of Wu died, and his ministers gave the throne to Sun Hao. Sun Hao was a promising young man, but upon ascension he became a tyrant, killing or exiling all who dared oppose him in the court. In 269 Yang Hu, a Jin commander in the south, started preparing for the invasion of Wu by ordering the construction of a fleet and the training of marines in Sichuan under Wang Jun. Four years later, Lu Kang, the last great general of Wu, died leaving no competent successor. The planned Jin offensive finally came at the end of 279. Sima Yan launched five simultaneous offensives along the Yangtze from Jianye (present-day Nanjing) to Jiangling while the Sichuan fleet sailed downriver to Jing Province. Under the strain of such an enormous attack, the Wu forces collapsed and Jianye fell in the third month of 280. Sun Hao surrendered and was given a fiefdom on which to live out his days. This marked the end of the Three Kingdoms era, and the beginning of a break in the forthcoming 300 years of disunity.

== Impact ==
=== Population ===
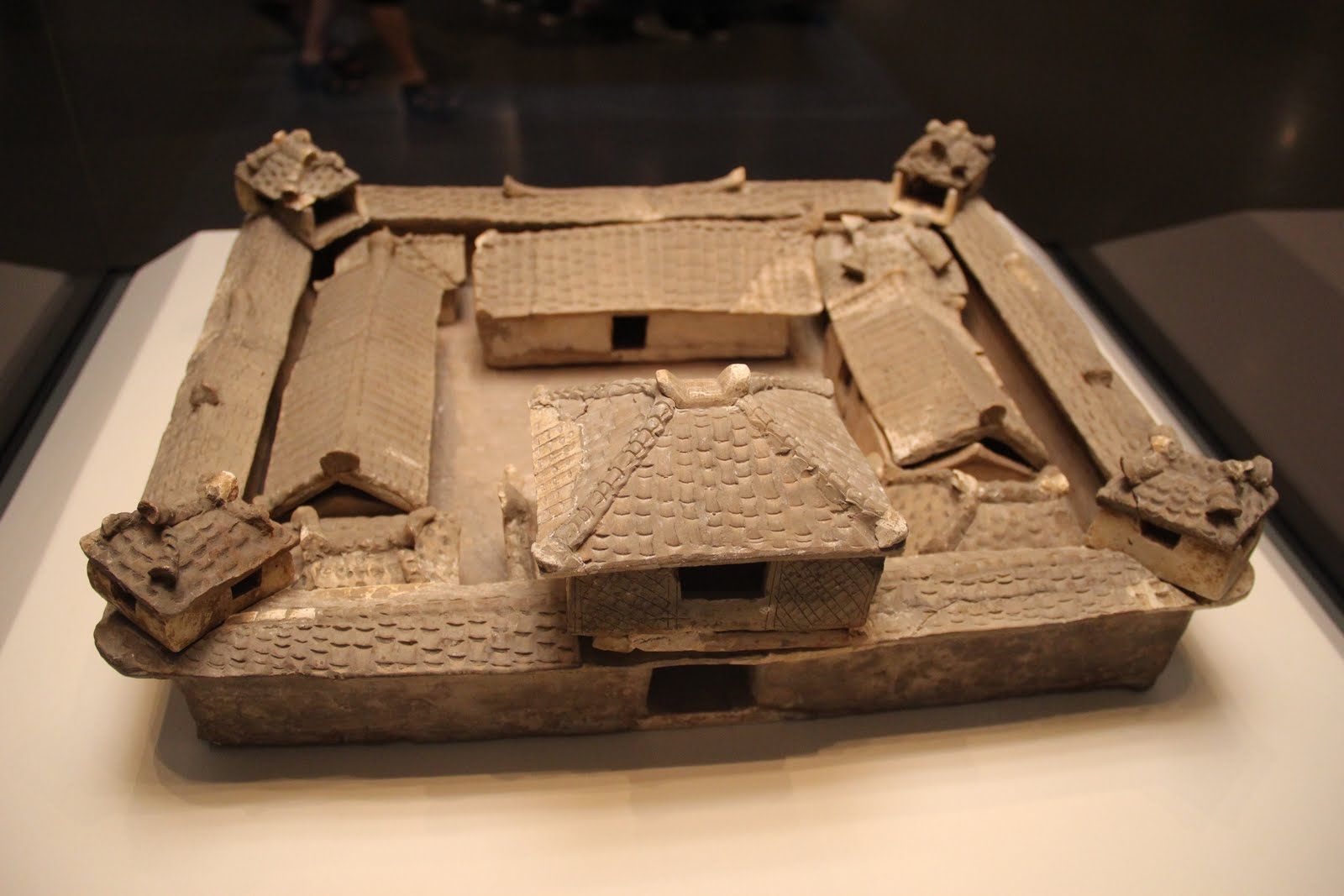
Pottery dwelling around a large courtyard, a siheyuan. Unearthed in 1967 in a tomb of Hubei built during the kingdom of Eastern Wu, National Museum of China, Beijing

After the Yellow Turban Rebellion, serious famine followed in the Central Plains of China. After his coming to power, Dong Zhuo gave full swing to his army to loot and plunder the population, and abduct women into forced marriages, servants or consorts. When the Guandong Coalition was starting the campaign against Dong Zhuo, he embarked upon a scorched earth campaign, proclaiming that "all the population of Luoyang be forced to move to Chang'an, all the palaces, temples, official residences and homes be burnt, no one should stay within that area of 200 li". Considering the hardships of that time this amounted to a death sentence for many, and cries of discontent rose as the population of Luoyang decreased sharply. When Cao Cao attacked Xu Province, it was said that "hundreds of thousands of men and women were buried alive, even dogs and chickens did not survive. The Si River was blocked. From then on, these five towns never recovered." When Li Jue and his army were advancing towards the Guanzhong area, "there remained hundreds of thousands of people, but Li Jue allowed his army to plunder the cities and the people, thus making the people have nothing but eat each other to death."

The following table shows the severe decrease of population during that period. From the late Eastern Han to the Western Jin dynasty, despite the length of about 125 years, the peak population only equalled 35.3% of the peak population during the Eastern Han dynasty. From the Western Jin dynasty to the Sui dynasty, the population never recovered. High militarisation of the population was common. For example, the population of Shu was 900,000, but the military numbered over 100,000. The Records of the Three Kingdoms contains population figures for the Three Kingdoms. As with many Chinese historical population figures, these numbers are likely to be less than the actual populations, since census and tax records went hand in hand, and tax evaders were often not on records.

During the Three Kingdoms period, a number of statuses intermediate between freedom and slavery developed, but none of them are thought to have exceeded 1 per cent of the population.

Three Kingdoms Period Populations
Year	Households	Population	Notes
Eastern Han dynasty, 156	10,679,600	56,486,856	
Shu Han, 221	200,000	900,000	
Shu Han, 263	280,000	1,082,000	At Shu's demise, the population contained 102,000 armed soldiers and 40,000 various officials.
Eastern Wu, 238	520,000	2,567,000	
Eastern Wu, 280	530,000	2,535,000	At Wu's demise, the population had 32,000 officials, 230,000 soldiers, and 5,000 imperial concubines.
Cao Wei, 260	663,423	4,432,881	
Western Jin dynasty, 280	2,495,804	16,163,863	After reuniting China, the Jin dynasty's population was greatest around this time.

While it is clear that warfare undoubtedly took many lives during this period, the census figures do not support the idea that tens of millions were wiped out solely from warfare. Other factors such as mass famines and infectious diseases, due to the collapse of sustaining governance and migrations out of China must be taken into account.

=== Economy ===
In the late Eastern Han dynasty, due to natural disasters and social unrest, the economy was badly depressed, leading to the massive waste of farmland. Some local landlords and aristocracy established their own strongholds to defend themselves and developed agriculture, which gradually evolved into a self-sufficient manorial system. The system of strongholds and manors also had effects on the economical mode of following dynasties. In addition, because of the collapse of the imperial court, those worn copper coins were not melted and reminted and many privately minted coins appeared. In the Three Kingdoms period, newly minted coins never made their way into currency. Due to the collapse of the coinage, Cao Wei officially declared silk cloth and grains as the main currencies in 221.

In economic terms the division of the Three Kingdoms reflected a reality that long endured. Even during the Northern Song dynasty, 700 years after the Three Kingdoms period, it was possible to think of China as being composed of three great regional markets. (The status of the northwest was slightly ambivalent, as it had links with the northern region and Sichuan). These geographical divisions are underscored by the fact that the main communication routes between the three main regions were all human-made: the Grand Canal linking north and south, the hauling-way through the Three Gorges of the Yangtze River linking southern China with Sichuan and the gallery roads joining Sichuan with the northwest. The break into three separate entities was quite natural and even anticipated by such political foresight as that of Zhuge Liang.

== Literature ==
Cao Cao, the founder of the Wei kingdom and his four sons were influential poets, especially Cao Zhi (192–232) and Cao Pi (187–226). Cao Pi wrote the earliest work of literary criticism, the Essay on Literature. Cao Zhi, together with Xu Gan, sponsored a resurgence of the Jian'an style of lyric poetry. Cao Zhi is considered by most modern critics to be the most important Chinese writer between Qu Yuan and Tao Yuanming.

== Historiography ==
=== Sources ===
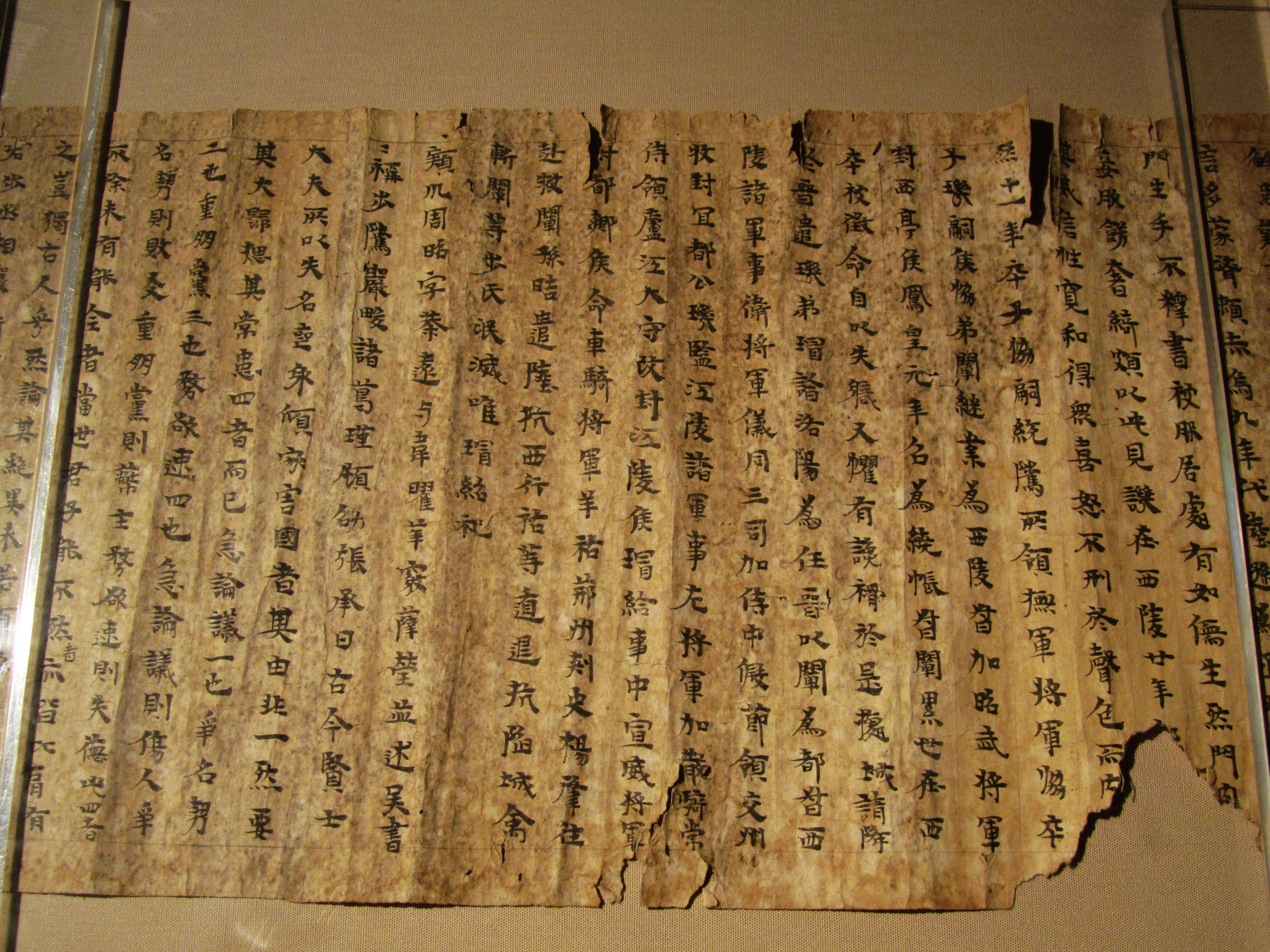
A fragment of the biography of Bu Zhi from the Records of the Three Kingdoms, part of the Dunhuang manuscripts

The standard history of the period is the Records of the Three Kingdoms, compiled by the Western Jin historian Chen Shou in the third century AD. The work synthesises the histories of the rival states of Cao Wei, Shu Han and Eastern Wu in the Three Kingdoms period into a single compiled text. An expanded version of the Records of the Three Kingdoms was published by the Liu Song historian Pei Songzhi in 429, whose Annotations to Records of the Three Kingdoms supplemented the original with sizeable excerpts of texts unused by Chen Shou and provided commentaries. The resulting work nearly doubled the size of the original Records, and the composite work of Chen and Pei are canonised as official history.

In addition to the Records of the Three Kingdoms, the years 189 to 220 are also covered by the previous standard history Book of the Later Han by Fan Ye (a contemporary of Pei Songzhi), which mainly draws from documents of the Han court. For the later years, biographies of the Jin dynasty progenitors Sima Yi, Sima Shi, and Sima Zhao are only found in the following standard history Book of Jin by the Tang dynasty historian Fang Xuanling.

=== The legitimacy issue ===
Traditional Chinese political thought is concerned with the concept of the "Mandate of Heaven", from which a ruler derives legitimacy to rule all under heaven. In the Three Kingdoms period, Cao Wei, Shu Han, and Eastern Wu all laid claim to the Mandate by virtue of their founders declaring themselves as emperors. Later historians would disagree on which of the Three Kingdoms (primarily between Wei and Shu) should be considered the sole legitimate successor to the Han dynasty.

Chen Shou, the compiler of the Records of the Three Kingdoms, hailed from Shu Han and became an official of the Western Jin dynasty when he was working on the Records. As Western Jin succeeded Cao Wei, Chen was careful in his compilation to imply Cao Wei was the legitimate state. Despite the description of events being mostly balanced and fair, Chen Shou legitimised Wei by placing the Wei annals first, using the era names from Wei's calendar, and reserving regal nomenclature for the leaders of Wei. Specifically, emperors of Cao Wei are referred to by their imperial posthumous names (e.g. Cao Pi is referred to as the "Civil Emperor" 文帝), while the Shu and Wu emperors are mere "rulers" (e.g. Liu Bei is referred to as the "First Ruler" 先主 and Sun Quan as "Ruler of Wu" 吳主). Chen Shou, as a subject of Jin, could not write in a way that implies Jin as illegitimate by denying Cao Wei's claim to the mandate, despite what sympathies he might have had toward his home state of Shu.

Chen Shou's treatment of the legitimacy issue was generally accepted through to the Northern Song dynasty. Despite maintaining that none of the three states truly held the Mandate of Heaven since they all failed to unify China, Song historian Sima Guang used Wei's era names and thus affirmed the legitimacy of Wei's succession to Han in his universal history Zizhi Tongjian. Sima Guang explained that his choice was merely out of convenience, and he was "not honouring one and treating another with contempt, nor making distinction between orthodox and intercalary positions." Nonetheless, the influential Neo-Confucian moralist Zhu Xi criticised Sima Guang's choice, taking the position that Shu Han was the true successor to the Han dynasty since Liu Bei was related to the imperial Liu clan by blood, and thus used Shu's calendar in his rewrite of Sima Guang's work, the Zizhi Tongjian Gangmu. This position, first argued by Xi Zuochi in the fourth century, found support in Zhu Xi's time since the Song dynasty found itself in a similar situation as Shu Han, as it was forced out of north China by the Jurchens in 1127 and became known as the Southern Song. The revisionist private histories of the time emphasised "humane governance" (仁政) as a mark of legitimate dynastic succession, and saw Liu Bei as an idealised Confucian monarch. The pro-Shu bias then found its way into popular forms of entertainment such as Sanguozhi Pinghua, a pinghua tale, and zaju performances, and was eventually codified in the 14th century historical novel Romance of the Three Kingdoms.

== Legacy in popular culture ==
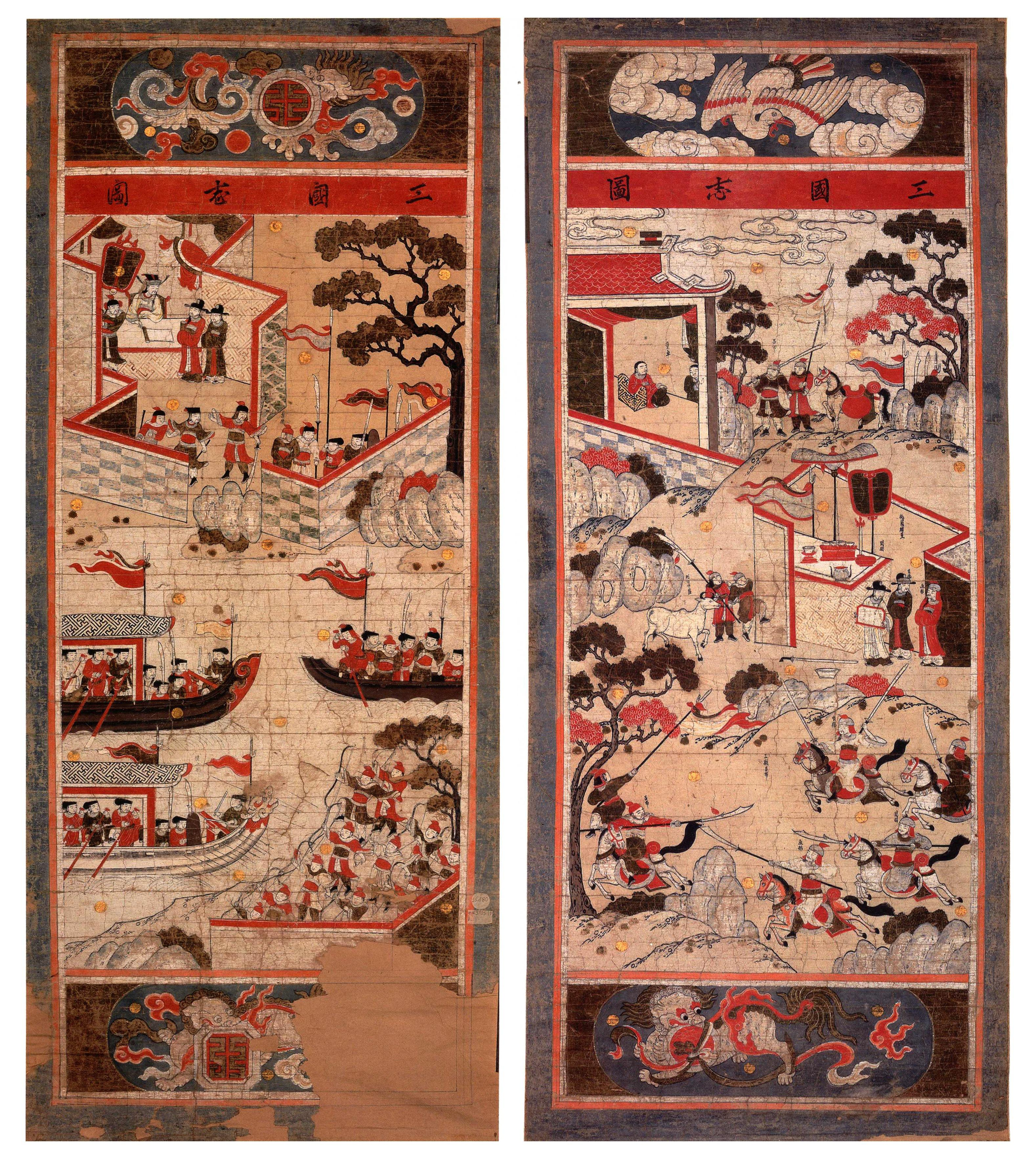
Vietnamese illustrations of the Romance of the Three Kingdoms, from Độc Lôi temple, Nghệ An, circa 1750-1784

Numerous people and affairs from the period later became Chinese legends. The most complete and influential example is the historical novel Romance of the Three Kingdoms, written by Luo Guanzhong during the Ming dynasty. Possibly due to the popularity of Romance of the Three Kingdoms, the Three Kingdoms era is one of the most well-known non-modern Chinese eras in terms of iconic characters, deeds and exploits. This is reflected in the way that fictional accounts of the Three Kingdoms, mostly based on the novel, play a significant role in East Asian popular culture. Books, television dramas, films, cartoons, anime, games, and music on the topic are still regularly produced in mainland China, Hong Kong, Taiwan, South Korea, Vietnam, Japan, and Southeast Asia.

Japanese video game developer Koei (later merged with Tecmo to form Koei Tecmo) introduced multiple generations of young gamers in the West to the Three Kingdoms period through its retelling of the history across its long and successful franchises of Romance of the Three Kingdoms strategy games and Dynasty Warriors action games. The games evoked a fascination with the period among many Western players, similar to the interest stoked among East Asians by local pop culture and media, albeit to a lesser extent in the West.

The 1999 Magic: The Gathering expansion set "Portal Three Kingdoms" is based on the period.

== See also ==
- Game of the Three Kingdoms
- Lists of people of the Three Kingdoms
- Six Dynasties poetry
- List of wars by death toll

== Bibliography ==
- Bielenstein, Hans (1947). "The census of China during the period 2–742 A.D.". Bulletin of the Museum of Far Eastern Antiquities. 19: 125–163.
- Cutter, Robert Joe; Crowell, William Gordon (1999). Empresses and consorts : selections from Chen Shou's Records of the Three States with Pei Songzhi's commentary. Honolulu: University of Hawaiì Press. ISBN 0-585-32007-1. OCLC 45843016.
- de Crespigny, Rafe (1984), Northern Frontier: The Policies and Strategy of the Later Han Empire, Canberra: The Australian National University, Faculty of Asian Studies, hdl:1885/148890, ISBN 978-0-86784-410-8
- — (1991). "The Three Kingdoms and Western Jin: A History of China in the Third Century AD ~ I" (PDF). East Asian History. 1 (1).
- — (2007). A Biographical Dictionary of Later Han to the Three Kingdoms, (23-220 AD0 (Handbook of Oriental Studies, Section 4). Leiden ; Boston: Brill Academic Publishers. ISBN 978-90-04-15605-0. OCLC 71779118.
- — (2018) [1990]. Generals of the South: the foundation and early history of the Three Kingdoms state of Wu (Internet ed.). Faculty of Asian Studies, The Australian National University. hdl:1885/148674.
- — (2020) [1996]. To Establish Peace: being the Chronicle of the Later Han dynasty for the years 189 to 200 AD as recorded in Chapters 59 to 63 of the Zizhi tongjian of Sima Guang (Internet ed.). Australia Centre on China in the World, The Australian National University. hdl:1885/212581. ISBN 978-0-7315-2537-9.
- Ge Jianxiong, 中国人口史 (History of the Population of China) vol 1. Shanghai: Fudan University Press, 2002. ISBN 7-309-03520-8
- Knechtges, David R. (2010). "From the Eastern Han Through the Western Jin (AD 25-317)". In Kang-yi Sun Chang; Stephen Owen (eds.). The Cambridge History of Chinese Literature. New York: Cambridge University Press. pp. 116–198. ISBN 9780521855587.
- Mansvelt Beck, B. J. (1986), "The fall of Han", in Twitchett, Denis; Loewe, Michael (eds.), The Cambridge History of China: Volume 1: The Ch'in and Han Empires, 221 BC–AD 220, vol. 1, Cambridge: Cambridge University Press, pp. 317–376, doi:10.1017/chol9780521243278.007, ISBN 978-0-521-24327-8
- McLaren, Anne E. (2006). "History Repackaged in the Age of Print: The "Sanguozhi" and "Sanguo yanyi"". Bulletin of the School of Oriental and African Studies, University of London. 69 (2): 293–313. doi:10.1017/S0041977X06000139. ISSN 0041-977X. JSTOR 20182040. S2CID 154489082.
- McLaren, Anne E. (2012). "Writing History, Writing Fiction: The Remaking of Cao Cao in Song Historiography". Monumenta Serica. 60 (1): 45–69. doi:10.1179/mon.2012.60.1.003. ISSN 0254-9948. S2CID 193917398.
- San, Tan Koon (2014). Dynastic China: An Elemental History. Malaysia: The Other Press. ISBN 978-9839541885.
- Taylor, Keith Weller (1983). The Birth of Vietnam. Berkeley, CA: University of California Press. ISBN 978-0-520-07417-0.
- Theobald, Ulrich (2000), "Chinese History – Three Kingdoms 三國 (220–280)", Chinaknowledge

Preceded by Han dynasty	Dynasties in Chinese history 220–280	Succeeded by Jin dynasty
