= Gongsun Kang =

3rd century Eastern Han dynasty warlord

- 公孫康

General of the Left (左將軍)
- In office 207–210
- Monarch: Emperor Xian of Han

Administrator of Liaodong (遼東太守)
- In office 204–210
- Monarch: Emperor Xian of Han
- Preceded by: Gongsun Du
- Succeeded by: Gongsun Gong

Personal details
- Born: Unknown
- Died: between 209 and December 220
- Relations: Gongsun Gong (younger brother)
- Children: Gongsun Huang; Gongsun Yuan
- Parent: Gongsun Du (father)
- Occupation: Military general, politician, warlord
- Peerage: Marquis of Xiangping (襄平侯)

Gongsun Kang (fl. 200s to 210s) was a Chinese military general, politician, and warlord who lived during the late Eastern Han dynasty. He became a vassal of the state of Cao Wei in the early Three Kingdoms period.

== Life ==
Gongsun Kang was a son of Gongsun Du, the Administrator of Liaodong appointed by the Han central government. In 204, he inherited his father's appointment and controlled the territories of Liaodong, Xuantu and Lelang commanderies. He was nominally subject to the Han chancellor Cao Cao, while keeping his domain semi-independent of the central government. In c. December 207, when Yuan Shang and Yuan Xi fled to Liaodong after being defeated by Cao Cao's forces, Gongsun Kang killed the Yuans and sent their heads to Cao Cao.

In 204, Gongsun Kang helped invade Goguryeo after the older brother of King Sansang of Goguryeo, Balgi, went to Gongsun Kang and requested 30,000 soldiers to invade Goguryeo so that Balgi could become king. Around this time, Kang established the Daifang Commandery by separating the southern half from the Lelang commandery. Although Goguryeo defeated the first invasion and killed Balgi, Kang invaded Goguryeo again in 209 and seized some of its territory and weakened Goguryeo. Pressure from Liaodong forced Goguryeo to move their capital in the Hun River valley to the Yalu River valley near Hwando.

When Gongsun Kang died, his younger brother Gongsun Gong succeeded him because his sons were still young at the time. Gongsun Kang's son Gongsun Yuan took back control of Liaodong in 228.

== See also ==
- Lists of people of the Three Kingdoms
