= Liaodong Commandery =

Commandery in imperial China

Liaodong Commandery (Chinese: 遼東郡) was a commandery in imperial China that existed from the Warring States period to the Northern dynasties. It was located in modern Liaoning, to the east of the Liao River.

The commandery was created by the state of Yan on its northern border during the Warring States period. In Western Han dynasty, It administered 18 counties, including Xiangping (襄平), Xinchang (新昌), Wulü (無慮), Wangping (望平), Fang (房), Houcheng (候城), Liaodui (遼隊), Liaoyang (遼陽), Xiandu (險瀆), Jujiu (居就), Gaoxian (高顯), Anshi (安市), Wuci (武次), Pingguo (平郭), Xi'anping (西安平), Wen (文), Fanhan (番汗), and Dashi (沓氏). In 2 AD, the population was 272,539, in 55,972 households. In Eastern Han, 11 counties remained, including Xiangping, Xinchang, Wulü, Wangping, Houcheng, Anshi, Pingguo, Xi'anshi, Wen, Fanhan and Dashi. In 140 AD, the population was 64,158 households. During the reign of Emperor Xian, management of Buyeo affairs was transferred from Xuantu Commandery to Liaodong. In the Cao Wei dynasty, Xiangping in Liaodong became the seat of an office known as the "Colonel of the Dongyi" (東夷校尉), which was in charge of the military and relationships with the local peoples. In early Western Jin, the territory became the Liaodong Principality (遼東國). In 280 AD, the commandery had 8 counties, and a population of 5,400 households. A number of new commanderies was established in the region throughout the Sixteen Kingdoms and Northern dynasties periods, and by the time of Northern Wei, Liaodong only consisted of 2 counties, namely Xiangping and Xinchang. It was eventually dissolved during Northern Qi.
