= Gongsun Du =

Han dynasty general and warlord (150-204)

- 公孫度

General of Military Might (武威將軍)
- In office c. 196 – 204
- Monarch: Emperor Xian of Han

Governor of Ping Province (平州牧) (self-appointed)
- In office ?–?
- Monarch: Emperor Xian of Han

Administrator of Liaodong (遼東太守)
- In office 190–204
- Monarch: Emperor Xian of Han
- Succeeded by: Gongsun Kang

Personal details
- Born: c.150 Liaoyang, Liaoning
- Died: 204
- Children: Gongsun Kang; Gongsun Gong
- Parent: Gongsun Yan (father)
- Occupation: Military general, politician, warlord
- Courtesy name: Shengji (升濟)
- Peerage: Marquis of Yongning District (永寧鄉侯)

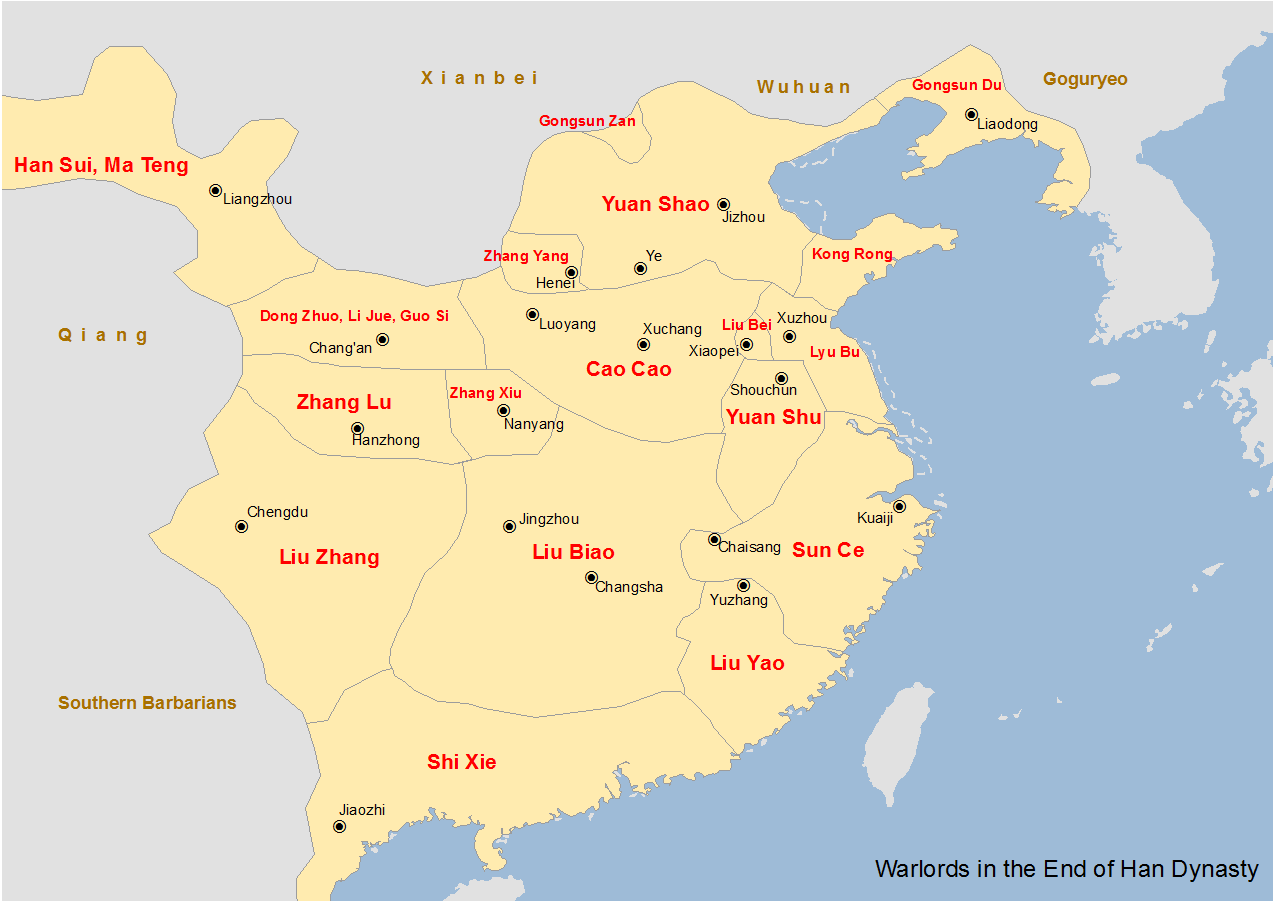
Map showing the major warlords of the Han dynasty in the 190s, including Gongsun Du

Gongsun Du (c.150 – 204), courtesy name Shengji, was a Chinese military general, politician, and warlord who lived during the late Eastern Han dynasty of China. He was not able to participate in battle until Dong Zhuo seized power from Emperor Shao. Dong Zhuo, hoping to expand the empire, gave Gongsun Du the command to attack the Korean Peninsula from across the sea. Gongsun Du was successful in his attack and also took control of the existing Daifang and Lelang commanderies established during the earlier period of the Han dynasty, among others.

Under another order from Dong Zhuo, and recommended by Xu Rong as Xu and Gongsun were from the same commandery, Gongsun Du took over Liaoning. This presaged the development of Gongsun Du's power base in the northeast. Gongsun Du later sent Gongsun Mo and Zhang Pi to present-day South Korea in an attempt to gain more land. He died in 204 and was succeeded by his son, Gongsun Kang, who continued to rule northeastern China.

== See also ==
- Lists of people of the Three Kingdoms
- Gongsun Zan
- Zhang Yan
