= List of surnames romanized Li =

Li is the pinyin and Wade–Giles romanization (spelled Lí, Lǐ, or Lì when pinyin tone diacritics are used) of several distinct Chinese surnames that are written with different characters in Chinese. Li 李 is by far the most common among them, shared by 93 million people in China, and more than 100 million worldwide. It is the second most common Chinese surname behind Wang.

Languages using the Latin alphabet do not distinguish between these different Chinese surnames, rendering them all as Li. In the United States, Li is the 14th most common surname among people of Asian-Pacific Islander descent and the 519th most common surname overall, up from 2,084th in 1990. Li is the 3rd most common Chinese surname in the Canadian province of Ontario, behind Wong and Chan.

== List of surnames romanized as Li or Lee ==
- Lǐ 李 (3rd tone), the 2nd most common surname in China, shared by 100 million people worldwide. The character also means "plum". Commonly spelled as Lee in Taiwan, Hong Kong, Macau, and overseas Chinese communities. In Vietnam, it is spelled as "Lý".
- Lǐ 理 (3rd tone), means "reason".
- Lí 黎 (2nd tone), the 84th most common surname in China. "Lai" or "Lye" in Cantonese. The character also means "dark".
- Lì 栗 (4th tone), the 249th most common surname in China. "Leut" in Cantonese. The character also means "chestnut".
- Lì 利 (4th tone), the 299th most common surname in China. The character also means "sharp", "take advantage"
- Lì 厲 / 厉 (4th tone). "Lai" in Cantonese. The character also means "strict" or "severe".
- Lì 酈 / 郦 (4th tone). "Lik" in Cantonese. The character is exclusively used in proper names and has no other meaning.
- Lì 莉 (4th tone), a rare surname of the Hui people. The character also means "jasmine".
- Lì 力 (4th tone), a rare surname meaning "power".

== Related surnames ==
- Lee (Korean surname): a common Korean surname derived from Lǐ 李.
- Lý (Vietnamese name): a Vietnamese surname derived from and also an alternate spelling of Lǐ 李.
- Lê (surname): a common Vietnamese surname derived from Lí 黎.

== See also ==
- List of people with surname Li
