= Li =

Li, li, or LI may refer to:

== Businesses and organizations ==
- Landscape Institute, a British professional body for landscape architects
- Leadership Institute, a non-profit organization located in Arlington, Virginia, US, that teaches "political technology."
- Li Auto (Nasdaq: LI), a Chinese manufacturer of electric vehicles
- Liberal International, a political federation for liberal parties
- Linux International, an international non-profit organization
- Lyndon Institute, an independent high school in the U.S. state of Vermont
- The Light Infantry, a British Army infantry regiment

== Language ==
- Li language, or Hlai
- Limburgish language (ISO 639-1 language code li)

== Names and people ==
- Li (surname), including:
  - List of people with surname Li
  - Li (surname 李), one of the most common surnames in the world
  - Li (surname 黎), the 84th most common surname in China
  - Li (surname 栗), the 249th most common surname in China
  - Li (surname 利), the 299th most common surname in China
  - Li (surname 厉), a Chinese surname
  - Li (surname 郦), a Chinese surname
- Li Andersson (born 1987), Finnish politician
- Li Kochman (born 1995), Israeli judoka

== Philosophy ==
- Li (Confucian), (simplified Chinese: 礼; traditional Chinese: 禮), a concept of ritual in Confucian philosophy
- Li (Neo-Confucianism), (Chinese: 理), a Chinese (Buddhist and Neo-Confucian) philosophical concept: 'reason', 'order', 'principle', 'idea'

== Places ==
- Long Island, New York
- Liechtenstein (ISO country code LI)
- Amphoe Li, a district in Lamphun Province, northern Thailand
- Li, Lamphun, Thailand, a village and subdistrict of Thailand
- Li, Norway, a village in Norway
- Li County (disambiguation), several counties in China
- Li River (disambiguation), rivers in China and Thailand

== Science and technology ==
- .li, the country code top level domain (ccTLD) for Liechtenstein
- Li, the polylogarithm function
- Li, the logarithmic integral function
- <li></li>, indicating an item in an HTML list; see HTML element <li>
- 954 Li, an asteroid
- Lifted index, meteorological term for temperature differential
- Lithium, symbol Li, a chemical element

== Units of measurement ==
- Li (unit) (里), a Chinese unit of length
- Li (short) (厘), a Chinese unit of length
- Li (area) (厘), a Chinese unit of land area
- Li (mass) or cash (unit) (厘), a Chinese unit of weight

== Other uses ==
- 51 (number), LI in Roman numerals
- Li (subdivision) (里), the basic level of administrative subdivisions in the Republic of China
- Li people (黎族), an ethnic group of China
- Li, an alien character in the 2011 first-person shooter video game Conduit 2
- Lawful interception, selective wiretapping of telecommunications by law enforcement agencies

== See also ==
- Lee (disambiguation)
