= Shelley Deeks =

Canadian public health physician

Chair of the National Advisory Committee on Immunization
- Prime Minister: Justin Trudeau
- Minister: Jean-Yves Duclos

Personal details
- Born: London, Ontario
- Children: 2
- Occupation: Public Health Physician

Shelley Deeks, MD, MHSc, FRCPC, FFAFPM, is a Canadian public health expert who is the chair of the National Advisory Committee on Immunization. Her advertised "specialities include communicable disease control, outbreak investigations, vaccine safety, epidemiology and program evaluation." She is a fellow of the Royal College of Physicians of Canada and the Australian Faculty of Public Health Medicine. Deeks was the executive lead in Ontario's COVID-19 pandemic response in 2020 in her role at Public Health Ontario.

== Career ==
=== SARS ===
During the SARS outbreak of 2003, Deeks was working at Health Canada and then moved to the Public Health Agency of Canada in infectious diseases.

=== Public Health Ontario (2009-2021) ===
In 2009, Deeks joined Public Health Ontario, where she served as the Medical Director of Immunization and Vaccine-Preventable Diseases, and later, as Chief of Communicable Diseases, Emergency Preparedness and Response. She participated as a member of the Ontario Vaccine Safety Surveillance Working Group. She also contributed to a presentation on increasing uptake of adult immunizations presented by Immunize Canada in 2015. At some time prior to 2020, Deeks was appointed chief health protection officer of Ontario.

Deeks delivered several presentations at the 2018 Canadian Immunization Conference in Ottawa, on subjects including vaccine development, adverse events following immunization, HPV vaccination for gay men, risks of un-immunized Ontario children, non-medical exemptions to vaccination, and MMR vaccines. The same year, she also presented at the Ontario Public Health Convention on the topics of the epidemiology of varicella, waning measles immunity in infants, and mumps activity in Ontario.

She has served on several international committees related to vaccination programs. From October 2018 until October 2020, she was a member of the Vaccine Innovation Prioritisation Strategy (VIPS) Steering Committee under Gavi, the Vaccine Alliance. She continues to serve on the World Health Organization's (WHO) Strategic Advisory Group of Experts Polio Working Group.

=== COVID-19 pandemic (2020-present) ===
In 2020, Deeks left Public Health Ontario one month after she "revealed that the government ignored Public Health Ontario's recommendations on COVID-19." In reality, she was not consulted in November 2020 "on colour-coded COVID restrictions", and two days after the revelations the Ford government moved to bring the colour codes into line with PHO's recommendations. Later that month, she delivered a virtual presentation to health care providers on the safety and efficacy of the then newly-authorized Moderna COVID-19 vaccine.

In February 2021, Deeks was appointed the inaugural public health surveillance medical officer of Nova Scotia. The press release said she would "lead Public Health surveillance, support epidemiologists and support Nova Scotia's publicly funded immunization program".

On 29 March 2021, as vice-chair of NACI, Deeks said that "There is substantial uncertainty about the benefit of providing AstraZeneca COVID-19 vaccines to adults under 55 given the potential risks." She said that the risk of a cerebral venous sinus thrombosis blood clot was "potentially as high as one in 100,000, much higher than the one in one million risk believed before... Most of the patients in Europe who developed a rare blood clot after vaccination with AstraZeneca were women under age 55, and the fatality rate among those who develop clots is as high as 40%." In June 2021, Deeks delivered a presentation for CANVax outlining NACI's recommendations regarding "mixing and matching" of COVID-19 vaccines. She assisted the Nova Scotia Department of Health and Wellness in a promotion campaign for the vaccine program, including encouraging second doses to protect against new variants of COVID-19 and reassuring viewers that side effects are rare and well-tolerated. She later participated in Q&A-style videos answering common questions about COVID-19 vaccines for ages 5–11.

In October 2021, Deeks and Nova Scotia’s Chief Medical Officer of Health Dr. Robert Strang criticized media allegations that healthcare providers were failing to identify and report adverse reactions to the COVID-19 vaccines, asserting that the risk of a serious adverse event was "about seven for every 100,000". Deeks was among the public health experts invited to a public debate during the Freedom Convoy by a group including anti-mandate doctors Paul E. Alexander, Roger Hodkinson and Byram Bridle.

Deeks is a member of the Advisory Committee on Immunization Practices as a liaison representative on behalf of NACI.

== Research ==
Deeks' areas of research interest include communicable disease outbreaks, vaccine safety, vaccine program evaluation, human papillomavirus vaccine, herpes zoster vaccine, and polio eradication.

=== Digital health ===
She collaborated in 2015 with the founders of Sigvaria Mobile Technologies Inc. on a paper exploring the benefits and challenges of using mobile devices as a method of centralizing storage and access to individual vaccination information, as well as for use in cross-border travel. Sigvaria developed ImmunizeCA, a smartphone application with various vaccine-related capabilities resembling an early version of a digital vaccine passport.

=== Infectious diseases ===
Deeks is the co-investigator of an ongoing Canadian Institutes of Health Research (CIHR) grant-funded study investigating Ontario's preparedness for the return of measles. She has also worked with researchers at SickKids to study the development of asthma following severe respiratory syncytial virus infection.

=== Vaccine safety ===
Deeks participated in a 2015 simulation study exploring the relationship between influenza vaccination and Guillain–Barré syndrome, which found an overall decrease in risk of acquiring the syndrome after receiving a flu shot. She was also co-author on a 2018 paper evaluating paediatric vaccine safety, funded by the Bill & Melinda Gates Foundation and the Institute for Clinical Evaluative Sciences. A 2017 safety study reviewing rotavirus vaccines in Canada was co-authored by Deeks.

=== COVID-19 ===
Deeks is a principal investigator in the Canadian Immunization Research Network's "COVID-19 Vaccine Readiness" program at Dalhousie University, funded by a $3,516,000 grant from the Public Health Agency of Canada.

== Other positions ==
Deeks is also or has been:

- an associate professor at the Dalla Lana School of Public Health, University of Toronto
- the vice-chair of Canada's National Advisory Committee on Immunization (NACI)
- the chair of NACI's Herpes Zoster Working Group
- a past chair of the WHO's Immunization Practices Advisory Committee
- a member of the Canadian Immunization Research Network (CIRN) Management Committee
- a member of the Public Health Agency of Canada's Canadian Federal/Provincial/Territorial Special Advisory Committee (SAC)

== Personal life ==
Shelley Deeks is married with two adult children. In her free time, Deeks enjoys sailing. Deeks is not a vegetarian.
