= Australian Technical Advisory Group on Immunisation =

Technical advisory group to the Australian Government

Agency overview
- Formed: 1 February 1998
- Jurisdiction: Australian Government
- Employees: 15 members
- Parent department: Department of Health, Disability and Ageing
- Website: health.gov.au/committees-and-groups/australian-technical-advisory-group-on-immunisation-atagi

The Australian Technical Advisory Group on Immunisation (ATAGI) is a technical advisory group of the Australian Government. As part of the Department of Health, Disability and Ageing, ATAGI provides advice to the Minister of Health and Ageing on the immunisation program of Australia and related matters, including the strength of evidence pertaining to existing, new, and emerging vaccines.

== Roles ==
ATAGI's role

- The main role of ATAGI is to provide advice on the administration of vaccinations related to the National Immunisation Program (NIP) to the Minister of Health
- Advisory on the ongoing immunisation research or the most needed areas
- furnish industry supports with pre-accommodation guidance for likely entries to the Pharmaceutical Benefits Advisory Committee (PBAC) on immunisation viability and use in Australia. ATAGI guidance should be looked for before support making an accommodation to the PBAC
- Discussion with pertinent associations to create the Australian Immunisation Handbook
- Discussion with significant associations in carrying out vaccination arrangements, strategies and immunization security

== Members ==
ATAGI's members are appointed by Minister of Health (including a Chair and Deputy Chair) through an informal nomination process for a term of four years. ATAGI comprise voting members (including a Chair and Deputy Chair) and six ex-officio members, which are:

- Assistant Secretary, Immunisation Branch, (Office for Health Protection) Department of Health, Disability and Ageing
- Director, Drug Safety and Evaluation, Therapeutic Goods Administration
- Representative from the National Immunisation Committee
- Representative from the Communicable Diseases Network Australia
- Director of the National Centre for Immunisation Research and Surveillance

=== Voting Members ===
As of May 2024, ATAGI's voting member are as follows:

No.	Position	Name	Start date	End date
1	Chair	Dr. Nigel Crawford	1 January 2023	30 June 2024
2	Deputy Chair	Assoc Prof Michelle Giles	1 January 2023	30 June 2024
3	Member	Dr. Julia Marshall	1 July 2023	30 June 2027
4	Member	Associate Professor Benjamin Teh	1 July 2023	30 June 2027
5	Member	Ms. Kristy Cooper	25 January 2021	30 June 2025
6	Member	Dr. Rosalind Webby	1 July 2023	30 June 2027
7	Member	Dr. Katherine Gibney	1 July 2023	30 June 2027
8	Member	Prof. Margaret Danchin	1 July 2023	30 June 2027
9	Member	Dr. Nicholas Silberstein	1 January 2023	30 June 2024
10	Member	Ms. Diane Walsh	1 January 2023	30 June 2025
11	Member	Prof. James Wood	1 January 2023	30 June 2025
12	Member	Ms. Karen Bellamy	1 July 2023	30 June 2027
13	Member	Prof. Katie Flanagan	1 July 2023	30 June 2027
14	Member	Prof. Penelope Burns	1 January 2023	30 June 2025
15	Member	Prof. Allen Cheng	1 January 2023	30 June 2025

=== Temporary Members ===
Temporary members may be appointed on a short term basis to provide specific expertise on key topics. Temporary members will be voting members for the term of their appointment to ATAGI.

== Meetings ==
The standard number of ATAGI meetings is six per year (in February, April, June, August, October and December), however they are yet to meet in 2024. These are pre-planned annually, according to the schedules of government and department programmes for the year. However, it is open for ATAGI to organise meetings and consultations at any time, whenever there may be need, on the group's initiative, or at the request of the department.

== Recommendations ==
=== Advice during COVID-19 pandemic ===
On 8 April 2021 during the COVID-19 pandemic in Australia, ATAGI met with the Therapeutic Goods Administration (TGA) regarding the recent concerns of blood clots following administration of the Oxford–AstraZeneca COVID-19 vaccine. ATAGI advised the government to use the AstraZeneca vaccine only for people over the age of 50. However on 17 June 2021, after cases of thrombosis with thrombocytopenia syndrome (TTS) and two deaths, ATAGI changed their previous advice and only recommended the AstraZeneca vaccine for those over 60 years-of-age. The Commonwealth government followed their advice.

==== COVID-19 vaccines for 12 to 15 years old individuals ====
On 27 August 2021, Pfizer Comirnaty vaccine has been recommended by ATAGI for adolescents aged 12 years or older after the TGA had extended the registration of the vaccine for administration to those age groups on 23 July 2021.

=== Booster dose for severely immunocompromised ===
On 8 October 2021, ATAGI recommends the government start the rollout of booster dose (3rd dose) of COVID-19 vaccines for severely immunocompromised persons aged 12 years old or older. The preferable vaccines for booster dose are the mRNA vaccine (Pfizer or Moderna). A 2 to 6 months interval for the booster dose from the date of second dose of the previous vaccine is recommended by ATAGI.

=== Booster dose for adult Australians ===
On 28 October 2021, ATAGI recommends the Comirnaty (Pfizer) vaccine as a booster dose for Australians aged 18 years or older, regardless of the previous COVID-19 vaccine used. The booster dose should be taken after six months from the second dose of the last course vaccination. However, the booster dose is not mandatory but recommended for high priority groups like aged care facilities, Aboriginal and Torres Strait Islanders, healthcare workers, people with underlying medical conditions, and people at increased occupational risk of COVID-19.

== See also ==
- Therapeutic Goods Administration
- National Immunization Technical Advisory Group (the global concept)
- Advisory Committee on Immunization Practices, immunisation advisory committee in the (United States)
- Joint Committee on Vaccination and Immunisation, immunisation advisory committee in the (United Kingdom)
- National Advisory Committee on Immunization, immunisation advisory committee in (Canada)
- Standing Committee on Vaccination, immunisation advisory committee in Germany
