= Canadian Public Health Association =

Canadian non-profit organization

Canadian Public Health Association logo

The Canadian Public Health Association (CPHA) is a national non-profit organization dedicated to public health.

The association was founded in 1910 by the editors of the Public Health Journal, which became the Canadian Public Health Journal under the auspices of the new organization. CPHA's objective was to establish professional standards for the field of public health and to advance research in the area. Prince Arthur, Duke of Connaught and Strathearn was named as the patron of the new organization, and its first president was T.A. Starkey of McGill University. CPHA received a federal charter in 1912. The organization celebrated its centenary in 2010.

The Association journal was later called the Canadian Journal of Public Health. It is a member of the Committee on Publication Ethics (COPE).

== Associated Projects ==
=== Conferences ===
==== Canadian Immunization Conference ====
CPHA is a leading collaborating organization behind the annual Canadian Immunization Conference (CIC) alongside the Canadian Association for Immunization Research, Evaluation and Education (CAIRE), the Canadian Paediatric Society, and the Public Health Agency of Canada. Sponsors for the event have included GlaxoSmithKline, Innovative Medicines Canada, Medicago, Merck, Pfizer, Public Health Ontario, Sanofi Pasteur, Seqirus and Valneva SE. Notable presenters include Dr. Shelley Deeks, Chair of the National Advisory Committee on Immunization (NACI).

==== Ontario Public Health Convention ====
CPHA co-hosts the annual Ontario Public Health Convention with the Association of Local Public Health Agencies (alPHa) and Public Health Ontario.

=== CANVax ===
CPHA developed the Canadian Vaccination Evidence Resource and Exchange Centre (CANVax) with funding from the Public Health Agency of Canada through the Immunization Partnership Fund. CANVax is a member of the World Health Organization-led project Vaccine Safety Net.

== Funding ==
CPHA receives financial support from corporate partners including Seqirus and the Schulich School of Medicine & Dentistry at the University of Western Ontario. Additional support has come from AstraZeneca, British Columbia Centre for Disease Control, Canadian Agency for Drugs and Technologies in Health, Canadian Institutes of Health Research (CIHR), Canadian Institute for Health Information (CIHI), Dalla Lana School of Public Health at the University of Toronto, Doctors of BC, GlaxoSmithKline, Heart and Stroke Foundation of Canada, Innovative Medicines Canada, Johnson & Johnson, Merck Canada, Novartis, Pfizer, Provincial Health Services Authority, Public Health Ontario, Sanofi Pasteur, University of Alberta School of Public Health, University of Waterloo Faculty of Applied Health Sciences, and Vancouver Coastal Health.
