= Baixing =

Chinese term that refers to "commoners"

Baixing (Chinese: 百姓; pinyin: bǎixìng; lit. 'hundred surnames') or lao baixing (Chinese: 老百姓; lit. 'old hundred surnames') is a traditional Chinese term, meaning "the people" or "commoners." The word "lao" (Chinese: 老; lit. 'old') is often added as a prefix before "baixing".

A confederation of tribes living along the Yellow River were the ancestors of what later became the Han ethnic group in China. Several large tribes, including the Huangdi tribes (Chinese: 黄帝族), Yandi tribes (Chinese: 炎帝族), and the Yi tribes, formed an alliance that consisted of roughly 100 tribes. This alliance is the origin of the Baixing, or the "hundred surnames."

Around 2,000 Han Chinese surnames are currently in use, but 19 of these surnames are used by about half of the Han Chinese people. About 87% of the population share 100 surnames.

== Chinese family names ==
Chinese family names are patrilineal, meaning derived from father to children. After marriage, Chinese women typically retain their maiden name. Two distinct types of Chinese surnames existed in ancient China: Namely xing (Chinese: 姓; pinyin: xìng) or ancestral clan names, and shi (Chinese: 氏; pinyin: shì) or branch lineage names. Later, the two terms began to be used interchangeably, and now xing refers to the surname, whereas shi may be used to refer to the clan name or maiden name. Historically, only Chinese men possessed xìng (Chinese: 姓; lit. 'family name'), while Chinese women had shì (Chinese: 氏; lit. 'clan') and took on their husband's xìng after marriage.

== Literary compilation ==
Hundred Family Surnames (Chinese: 百家姓), commonly known as Bai Jia Xing, is a classic Chinese text that lists Chinese surnames. The book was composed in the early Song dynasty. The text originally contained 411 surnames and was expanded to 504 over time.

In the dynasties following the Song, the Three Character Classic, the Hundred Family Surnames, and Thousand Character Classic came to be known collectively as San Bai Qian (Three, Hundred, Thousand), from the first word in their titles. San Bai Qian was the universal introductory literary text for students, almost exclusively males from elite backgrounds.

== Use of surnames to study Chinese ethnicity ==
Chinese surnames have been proposed to be used as an alternative method of identifying an individual ethnicity. Secondary data sources used by health research may not include information on race or ethnicity, and surnames are often used as a proxy when researching health care in ethnic populations. A study published by BioMed Central (BMC), an open-access publisher of reliable peer-reviewed journals, asserts that surname lists help to identify cohorts of ethnic minority patients, and it attempted to validate the lists to identify people of South Asian and Chinese origin. The study in Ontario, Canada, reviewed lists of South Asian and Chinese surnames and compared these to the Registered Persons Directory to assign specific ethnicities. The findings were validated against self-identified ethnicity through responses to the Canadian Community Health Survey. The conclusion was that surname lists can identify cohorts with South Asian and Chinese origins with a high degree of accuracy.

A similar study in the Canadian Journal of Public Health on the validity of using surname to define Chinese ethnicity found that using surnames in existing health records and surname lists are reasonably sensitive and comparable.

The American Journal of Epidemiology published a paper conducted from the same research in Ontario, Canada by Choi et al. (1993), using the Ontario all-cause mortality database from 1982–1989 to test if the surnames accurately identify individuals of Chinese ethnicity. The databases were randomly split into two and then compiled against varying cut-offs of positive likelihood ratios; surnames that did not meet the cut-off were then matched against the Book of Hundred Family Names (1973). The results proved reasonably positive, with high levels of sensitivity, positive predictive value, and positive likelihood ratio for both males and females. The research team did not find a universal set of Chinese ancestry names that can be applied in epidemiology studies. However, the authors proposed that every location may require ancestral names produced in its period to ensure accuracy and reliability.

== Implications of current Chinese surname system; research on a new surname system ==
Chinese surnames have a history of three thousand years. The system of Chinese surnames was developed to distinguish different families and prevent the marriage of individuals from the same family names. However, a study done by Zhang (2009), found that in the current Chinese surname system, there is a deep-rooted traditional belief that families have a preference for having a male child since surnames are passed on to the sons of the families. This study aimed to propose a new surname system so that children would adopt neither of their parents' surnames, but parental surnames could be inferred from their surnames.

Another study published in the Journal of Economic Behaviour and Organization by Elsevier investigated the effects of China's two-child policy on its gender ratio. It asserts that the previous one-child policy induced attempts at manipulating the birth process. The move towards a two-child policy which should suggest that the gender imbalance in China would improve substantially required closer examination. Comparing India, Vietnam, and South Korea that do not enforce a one-child policy it found the same gender imbalance as China, which highlights the intensity and pervasiveness of son-preference and attempts to build a model of parental decision-making and attempts to manipulate the birth of children to increase the likelihood of a male. It concludes that the move towards a two-child policy may show initial improvements in gender imbalance, but where an underlying preference for a male child remains, the problem of inequality will not improve.

An article published in Nature, found that the birth rate per woman had dropped from 5.4 in 1971 to 1.8 in 2001, by China's one-child policy enforced in 1979, due to selective determination of the gender of a child. According to Ball (2008), the primary cause of the gender-ratio imbalance is traditional values. The motivation for gender selection is partly welfare, in that a Chinese son is duty-bound to look after the needs of his parents, while a daughter's obligations transfer to her in-laws when she marries (Ball, 2009). With traditional gendered roles, a son carries on the family names, and a daughter is part of the in-law's family after marriage, which may have caused the gender ratio in China to become imbalanced. Zhang's (2009) study aims to address this problem and suggests that Chinese families could revise traditional views on gender roles, starting with a proposed new surname system.

== Deriving social networks based on Chinese surnames ==
Chinese surnames are also applied to studies regarding social systems among individuals to construct complex networks where there are connections to and from individuals through what are considered 'edges' and 'nodes'. A study from Boston University and Beijing Normal University, aimed to "extend the network presentation of surname data to a spatial network and to investigate the Chinese regional hierarchical structure and geographical features behind the geographical distribution of surnames." The researchers obtained surnames and administrative regions at a provincial level of all the Chinese officially registered in China's National Citizen Identity Information Centre (NCIC). By constructing nodes on current networks, it aimed to demonstrate the social relationships between various provinces of China. The results supported the Tobler's First Law of Geography, which states that the most connected provinces in the spatial Minimum Spanning Tree (MST) are geographically adjacent and that all clusters identified are geographically continuous. The use of Chinese surnames not only helped this study to locate the local and global centers of China but also provided evidence of the historical mass migration to the Northeast (Alpha History, 2016).

Chen et al. (2019) studied the relationship between Chinese surname distribution and its effects on population dynamics; their research asserts that surname distribution is an integrative result of evolutionary forces such as drift, mutation, and migration. Chinese surnames have been well preserved over centuries, with long-term integration between locals and migrants. However, the scale of these effects on the local population varies from region to region. Using a surname dataset from China's NCIC as its primary data, it used a new index of surname diversity, the coverage ratio of stretched exponential distribution (CRSED) to characterize the significance between the exponential term to power-law term in the distribution (Chen et al., 2019). The 2019 study found that prefectures with higher CRSEDs are more alike to other prefectures, while the ones with lower CRSEDs are more dissimilar. This provided insight into the population dynamics in the different regions. According to Chen et al., it can be inferred that in prefectures with higher CRSEDs, migratory movements seem to be the dominant force in population dynamics, whereas drift and mutation are the dominant evolutionary forces in prefectures with lower CRSEDs. Although a hypothesis, explaining population dynamics with Chinese surnames is considered a useful approach by anthropologists, genetics, and physicists.

== Analysis of Chinese surnames in the United States ==
Chinese surnames have also been included in studies to define the various aspects of a Chinese identity. Leung, noted that the term "Chinese" can refer to an ethnicity, a group of people, or languages, which is an oversimplification of a complex nation, languages, peoples, and cultures The study looked at Chinese surnames in America, studying Cantonese and Hoisan-wa histories to disambiguate the terms. The United States of America has a diverse spread of ethnic Chinese immigrants of different languages and cultural backgrounds. Leung states that most Chinese Americans can trace their ancestors' arrival back to the ninetieth and mid-twentieth centuries, from a shared Szeyap ancestral heritage. The Szeyap region is an area in Guangdong, a Chinese province in Mainland China. By analyzing the surnames of Chinese Americans, Leung has found that third-generation-plus Chinese Americans have attempted to assimilate and Anglicise their surnames. Indeed, an article published in the Journal of Pragmatics states that Western-style English names are very commonly used by Chinese people of Hong Kong to communicate with Westerners and among themselves. The research compares the relative significance of names between Western and Chinese systems, examining the increasingly extensive use of Western-style English names by Hong Kong bilinguals. Li asserts that it can be argued that the motivations behind adopting Western names by the Chinese could be the preference for realizing an "involvement strategy" in Western interpersonal address forms.

The writer also notes that the Hoisan-wa views misspelling their names by using pinyin Romanization would "skew Chinese American history" (Louie, 1998). The difference in naming practices between the Hoisan-wa and the Cantonese show that even though Chinese surnames may sound similar, intricate details are involved in the naming practices amongst different cultures and ethnicities.
