= Li Feng =

Li Feng may refer to:

- Li Feng (athlete) (born 1965), Chinese Olympic sprinter
- Li Feng (李豐), military officer serving under the warlord Yuan Shu in the Eastern Han dynasty
- Li Feng (Cao Wei) (李豐), official of the Cao Wei state in the Three Kingdoms period
- Li Feng (Three Kingdoms) (李豐), son of the Shu Han state general Li Yan (Three Kingdoms) in the Three Kingdoms period
- Li Feng (sinologist) (李峰), Columbia University sinologist
- Li Feng (rapist) (栗峰), executed rapist

== See also ==
- Li & Fung
