= Lǐ =

Lǐ is a transliteration from Chinese and may refer to:

- Li (surname 李)
- Li (unit)

== See also ==
- Li (disambiguation)
