= Atagi =

Atagi or ATAGI may refer to:

- Australian Technical Advisory Group on Immunisation, a body of the Australian Government which provides technical advice on immunisation to the Minister for Health

== People ==
- Atagi Fuyuyasu (1528–1564), Japanese samurai
- Atagi Nobuyasu (1549–1578), Japanese samurai, son of above

== Places ==
- Novye Atagi, rural locality (a selo) in Shalinsky District of the Chechen Republic, Russia
- Starye Atagi, rural locality (a selo) in Groznensky District of the Chechen Republic, Russia
