= Lilu =

Lilu may refer to:

- Lilu (ancient China), a tribe or state in ancient China
- Lilu (mythology), a creature in Akkadian mythology
- Lilu, Estonia, a village in Estonia
