= Yuan Yida =

- Born: 1947 (age 78–79); Shanghai, Republic of China
- Education: Peking University
- Scientific career
- Fields: Biology
- Workplaces: Stanford University; Chinese Academy of Sciences

Yuan Yida (simplified Chinese: 袁义达; traditional Chinese: 袁義達; pinyin: Yuán Yìdá) is a researcher from the Institute of Genetic and Developmental Biology at the Chinese Academy of Sciences. He is a leading researcher on Chinese surnames in mainland China, and has been working on statistical studies of surname distribution in the People's Republic of China over the past two decades. He led the research on an updated, 2006 version of the Hundred Family Surnames, a text of popular surnames originally published in the Song dynasty, encompassing 4100 surnames from 296 million individuals in 1110 counties.

Yuan Yida was born in 1947 in Shanghai, tracing his ancestry to Fenghua, Zhejiang. He spent much of his youth in Ningbo, before moving to Beijing and attending Beijing University. Between 1988 and 1992 he conducted research at Stanford University. In mainland China he has published more than 30 articles and two monographs.

In 1987, he estimated there were between 12,000 and 13,000 surnames in China.

He demonstrated that two individuals with the same surname in China could have received that surname from one of several different surnames in an earlier era, casting doubt over the notion that those who share the same surname today would be considered "belonging to the same family five hundred years ago".

He has remarked that fortune-telling based on surnames exists in China, labeling it "nonsense". He claimed that research on surnames may invoke patriotic feelings in overseas Chinese by drawing them closer to other Chinese with the same surname.
