= Cody Meissner =

Professor of pediatrics

H. Cody Meissner, M.D., is professor of pediatrics at the Geisel School of Medicine at Dartmouth College. He is, as of August 2025, a member of the ACIP, the CDC's advisory committee on vaccines. Meissner was also a member of the ACIP from 2008 - 2012. He was not a signatory of the Great Barrington Declaration.

== Career ==
=== ACIP ===
In 2025 Meissner was the only committee member who voted against recommending only using flu vaccines without thimerosal. Meissner also voted against ending a recommendation that newborns be vaccinated against hepatitis B.
