= National Advisory Committee on Immunization =

Canadian medical advisory body

- Comité consultatif national de l'immunisation

Agency overview
- Formed: 1964
- Jurisdiction: Government of Canada
- Headquarters: Ottawa, Ontario
- Minister responsible: Hon. Jean-Yves Duclos, Minister of Health
- Agency executives: Dr. Shelley Deeks, Chair; Dr. Robyn Harrison, Vice Chair
- Parent agency: Public Health Agency of Canada
- Website: https://www.canada.ca/en/public-health/services/immunization/national-advisory-committee-on-immunization-naci.html

The National Advisory Committee on Immunization (NACI; French: Comité consultatif national de l'immunisation; CCNI) is an advisory body that provides the Government of Canada with medical and scientific advice relating to human immunization.

== History ==
The NACI's precursor, The National Advisory Committee on Immunizing Agents, was established in 1964. And it was mandated to provide advice on immunizing agents to the Department of National Health and Welfare. In 1975, focus on advice related to the introduction of new vaccines and to assist in the development of immunization programs became the new mandate of the committee. In 1978, the committee was officially renamed into The National Advisory Committee on Immunization, in order to reflect the new mandate for consideration of procedures related to immunization and immunization coverage.

== Role ==
NACI is mandated to provide the Public Health Agency of Canada (PHAC) with medical, scientific, and public health advice relating to vaccines, including the use of vaccines in humans, vaccine evaluation, and the monitoring of vaccine-associated adverse events.

== Membership ==
The NACI is composed of 14 voting members (chair, vice-chair, and 12 voting members), executive secretary, roughly a dozen industry liaison representatives, and roughly a dozen ex-officio professional public service representatives from Health Canada. NACI's voting members composed of experts in the fields of immunization, public health, vaccine preventable diseases, pediatric or adult infectious diseases, allergy/immunology, other health related fields.

As of May 2024, the membership of NACI consists of:

- Leadership
  - Dr. Robyn Harrison, Chair
  - Dr. Vinita Dubey, Vice-chair
- Voting members
  - Dr. Melissa Andrew
  - Dr. Julie Bettinger
  - Dr. Nicholas Brousseau
  - Dr. Arianne Buchan
  - Dr. Hélène Decaluwe
  - Dr. Philippe De Wals
  - Dr. Eve Dubé
  - Dr. Kyla Hildebrand
  - Dr. Kristin Klein
  - Ms. Miranda O'Driscoll
  - Dr. Jesse Papenburg
  - Dr. Anne Pham-Huy
  - Dr. Beate Sander
  - Dr. Sarah Wilson
- Executive secretary
  - Dr. Matthew Tunis
- Liaison representatives
  - Dr. Jeannette Comeau - Association of Medical Microbiology and Infectious Disease Canada, Halifax, NS
  - Dr. Sarah Buchan - Canadian Association for Immunization Research and Evaluation, Toronto, ON
  - Dr. Monika Naus - Canadian Immunization Committee, Vancouver, BC
  - Ms. Lea Bill - Canadian Indigenous Nurses Association, Siksika, AB
  - Ms. Lucie Marisa Bucci - Canadian Public Health Association, Ottawa, ON
  - Ms. Amanda Ung - Canadian Pharmacists Association, Toronto, ON
  - Dr. Dorothy Moore - Canadian Paediatric Society, Montréal, QC
  - Dr. Martin Lavoie - Council of Chief Medical Officers of Health, Vancouver, BC
  - Ms. Jessica MacNeil - Centers for Disease Control and Prevention, Atlanta, Georgia, USA
  - Ms. Melanie Osmack - Indigenous Physicians Association of Canada, Vancouver, BC
  - Dr. Eliana Castillo - Society of Obstetrics and Gynecologists, Calgary, AB
  - Vacant - Canadian Nurses Association
  - Dr. Jen Potter - College of Family Physicians of Canada, Winnipeg, MB
- Ex-officio representatives
  - Dr. Co Pham - Biologics and Genetic Therapies Directorate, Health Canada, Ottawa, ON
  - Dr. Vincent Beswick-Escanlar - Directorate of Force Health Protection, National Defense and the Canadian Armed Forces, Ottawa, ON
  - Ms. Ming Su - Vaccine Preventable Diseases (VPD) Surveillance, Public Health Agency of Canada, Ottawa, ON
  - Ms. Erin Henry - Centre for Immunization Readiness (CIR), Public Health Agency of Canada, Ottawa, ON
  - Mr. Patrick Fandja - Marketed Health Products Directorate, Health Canada, Ottawa, ON
  - Dr. Michael Routledge - National Microbiology Laboratory, Public Health Agency of Canada, Winnipeg, MB
  - Ms. Susanna Ogunnaike-Cooke - Vaccine Safety Surveillance, Public Health Agency of Canada, Ottawa, ON
  - Dr. Tom Wong - First Nations and Inuit Health Branch, Indigenous Services Canada, Ottawa, ON
  - Ms. Mireille Lacroix - Public Health Ethics Consultative Group (PHECG), Ottawa, ON

== COVID-19 pandemic ==
NACI became prominent during the COVID-19 pandemic, as publisher of recommendations and guidance surrounding distribution of COVID-19 vaccines. Some of NACI's recommendations have been criticized as counter-productive in terms of public health and communications concerning the pandemic.

=== Dose scheduling ===
In March 2021, amid supply shortages, NACI issued a strong recommendation that second doses of two-dose COVID-19 vaccines (such as the AstraZeneca, Moderna, and Pfizer vaccines) be given up to four months after the first, as opposed to the three-to-four week intervals used in the clinical trials and recommended by Health Canada. NACI stated that this recommendation was based on modelling from data showing that "the first two months of real world effectiveness are showing sustained high levels of protection."

Pfizer Canada president Cole Pinnow warned against the recommendation in the House of Commons, stating that "the data that we’ve seen from a real world evidence perspective that has been used to make arguments to extend the dose schedule has been done on much younger populations", and that "we don't have any data after two months to know what the impact of one dose will be."

On May 28, citing improved vaccine availability, NACI recommended that second doses be administered "as soon as possible", and especially to individuals who are at high risk, but that it "continues to recommend that jurisdictions should maximize the number of individuals benefiting from the first dose of a COVID-19 vaccine by extending the second dose of COVID-19 vaccine up to four months after the first."

=== mRNA vaccine preference ===
On May 4, 2021, NACI issued a recommendation that mRNA-based vaccines should be preferred over viral vector vaccines such as the AstraZeneca and Janssen vaccines, due to the rare risk of vaccine-induced immune thrombotic thrombocytopenia (VITT). Vice-chairman Shelley Deeks stated that "individuals need to have an informed choice to be vaccinated with the first vaccine that's available, or to wait for an mRNA vaccine."

Various politicians and public health authorities argued that such statements concerning officially-approved vaccines would encourage hesitancy, and impede the public health goal of inoculating the public as quickly as possible. On May 6, NACI issued a follow-up statement wishing to clarify that their previous statement was not to imply that anyone taking a vaccine such as AstraZeneca was making a mistake, and that it was adequately effective for protecting against COVID-19.

=== Dose mixing ===
On 1 June 2021, NACI issued a recommendation that those who had received the AstraZeneca vaccine as their first dose may safely receive an mRNA vaccine as their second dose instead. The recommendation cited studies occurring in Europe over similar mixing of doses being performed due to concerns over the AstraZeneca vaccine, including one that showed a sevenfold increase in antibody presence in patients who received AstraZeneca as their first dose and Pfizer as their second. It is still recommended that those who received an mRNA vaccine as a first dose receive the same vaccine for their second dose, but that the two mRNA vaccines can be interchangeable if supply is limited.

Public health officials warned that Canada's use and orders of the AstraZeneca had to be controlled in order to prevent waste, especially as those concerned over VITT (which was associated more with the first dose) request an mRNA option for their second dose instead.

Some countries and non-Canadian businesses have refused to recognize individuals that have received mixed doses as being fully vaccinated; at U.S.-based ports, multiple cruise lines stated that they would only accept passengers fully vaccinated in means approved by the US FDA (only accepting matching doses of the Moderna or Pfizer vaccine, or the Janssen vaccine). In mid-July, Prime Minister Justin Trudeau stated that they were "going to work with the international community to make sure that people who are fully vaccinated in ways that Canadians recognize as safe and effective are also recognized around the world."

== See also ==
- Advisory Committee on Immunization Practices (United States)
- Joint Committee on Vaccination and Immunisation (United Kingdom)
- National Immunization Technical Advisory Group (the global concept)
- Standing Committee on Vaccination (Germany)
