= National Immunisation Program =

Australian population vaccination program

- Specialty: Preventative and public health
- Uses: Prevents infection from serious diseases in Australia based on the vaccination schedule
- Approach: Mass population vaccination
- Frequency: Per the vaccination schedule
- Outcomes: Immunity against serious diseases

The National Immunisation Program (NIP) and National Immunisation Program Schedule (NIP Schedule) is the national vaccination schedule for all children and adults in Australia. The program is a joint federal, state and territory government initiative that funds all vaccinations on the schedule for all people eligible for Medicare. It aims to reduce the prevalence of preventable diseases and increase vaccination coverage in the Australian population. NIP-funded vaccines are available through general practices, local council and community health clinics, Aboriginal Community Controlled Health Services and pharmacies. Like all vaccinations, schedule immunisations are not mandatory, although some additional government benefits and early education providers require vaccination or an approved exemption.

The NIP Schedule lists vaccinations for all Australians from birth through to adulthood. Childhood vaccinations are recommended at birth, 2 months, 4 months, 6 months, 12 months, 18 months, and 4 years. Adolescent vaccinations are recommended at 12–13 years and 14–16 years, and are usually given at free school-based clinics. Adult vaccinations are recommended for all pregnant women, and people aged over 65 and 70 years. Additional or early vaccinations are funded for Aboriginal and/or Torres Strait Islander peoples and people with specific medical conditions due to a higher rate or risk of infection and serious illness. The program also funds some catch-up vaccinations for people who were not immunised as children, up until 20 years of age. Catch-up vaccination is also available for free until 25 years of age for HPV vaccination, or through all of adulthood for refugees and humanitarian visa holders.

== History ==
The National Immunisation Program was first introduced in Australia in 1997. The program was set up by the Commonwealth, state and territory governments. The most recent update to the National Immunisation Program was effective since 1 April 2019. This was an update from the 2007 schedule, one change including the introduction of meningococcal ACWY vaccination for adolescents. The National Immunisation Program Schedule includes vaccines that are funded for children, adolescents and adults. Additional vaccinations necessary when traveling to particular countries are not included in the program, nor are they funded.

At September 2019, the national immunisation coverage rates were:

- 94.27% for all one-year-olds
- 91.43% for all two-year-olds
- 94.82% for all five-year-olds according to the Australian Government Department of Health.

The national coverage rate has increased over the last 10 years, as of 2019.

== Program operation ==
The Australian Immunisation Handbook (AIH) is the national clinical guideline that sets out vaccination recommendations, based on scientific research such randomised controlled trials and meta-analyses. All NIP Schedule vaccinations are recommended by the AIH, and are selected for national funding based on the clinical and cost effectiveness of each vaccine. All states and territories fund various additional vaccinations that are recommended by the AIH, but not funded under the NIP.

=== Vaccination incentives ===
Vaccinations listed on the NIP Schedule, like all vaccinations, are not mandatory. Patients or their guardian have the choice whether or not to receive NIP vaccinations. NIP schedule vaccinations are, however, a requirement for some federal government tax benefits, with approved exemptions where vaccination is medically contraindicated.

The Australian Government requires children to receive all NIP Schedule vaccines, or have an approved exemption, appropriate for their age for the parent or guardian to receive the full Family Tax Benefit Part A or the federal Child Care Subsidy. All vaccinations administered or medical exemptions in Australia must be reported by the clinician to the Australian Immunisation Register (AIR), linked to the child's Medicare registration. When parents or guardians apply to Services Australia to receive either payment, they must provide the Medicare details of the child. Services Australia will then confirm that the child is up-to-date with NIP Schedule vaccinations by searching the AIR.

Most state and territories either allow or require early childhood education providers to decline enrolments for unvaccinated children. All states and territories either allow or require providers or public health physicians to exclude unvaccinated children if there is an outbreak of NIP vaccine-preventable diseases.

For both federal and state and territory requirements, approved exemptions can be issued by qualified general practice doctors, paediatricians, public health or infectious disease physicians, or clinical immunologists. Exemptions for the purpose of government requirements can only be issued where there is a genuine medical contraindication to vaccination, including anaphylaxis to a previous dose or component, immunocompromise for live vaccines, or for some diseases, natural immunity.

== National Immunisation Program Schedule ==
=== Childhood vaccinations ===
Video: most vaccinations are given by parenteral administration, such as a subcutaneous injection into the bottom layer of the skin.

Birth

- Hepatitis B

2 weeks (Can be given from 6 weeks of age)

- Diphtheria
- Tetanus
- Pertussis (whooping cough)
- Hepatitis B
- Polio
- Haemophilus influenzae type b
- Pneumococcal
- Rotavirus ("First dose must be given by 14 weeks of age, and the second dose by 24 weeks of age")

4 months

- Diphtheria
- Tetanus
- Pertussis (whooping cough)
- Hepatitis B, polio
- Haemophilus influenzae type b
- Pneumococcal
- Rotavirus

6 months

- Diphtheria
- Tetanus
- Pertussis (whooping cough)
- Hepatitis B, polio
- Haemophilus influenzae type b

12 months

- Meningococcal ACWY
- Measles, mumps, rubella (MMR Vaccine)
- Pneumococcal

18 months

- Haemophilus influenzae type b
- Measles, mumps, rubella (MMR Vaccine)
- Varicella (chickenpox)
- Diphtheria
- Tetanus
- Pertussis (whooping cough)

4 years

- Diphtheria
- Tetanus
- Pertussis (whooping cough)
- Polio

=== Adolescent vaccinations ===
12–13 years

- Human papillomavirus (HPV)
- Diphtheria, tetanus, pertussis (whooping cough)

14–16 years

- Meningococcal ACWY

=== Adult vaccinations ===
15–49 years

- Pneumococcal

50 years and over

- Pneumococcal

70–79 years

- Shingles (herpes zoster)

== See also ==
- COVID-19 vaccination in Australia
- Australian Technical Advisory Group on Immunisation
