= Li Shang =

Chinese general and politician of the Han dynasty

- 酈商

Personal details
- Born: Unknown; Qi County, Henan
- Died: 180 BC
- Relatives: Li Yiji (brother); Li Ji (son); Li Jian (son)
- Occupation: General, politician
- Posthumous name: Marquis Jing (景侯)
- Peerage: Marquis of Quzhou (曲周侯)

Li Shang (酈商; died 180 BC), posthumously known as Marquis Jing of Quzhou (曲周景侯), was a Chinese general and politician of the early Han dynasty who served under Liu Bang (Emperor Gaozu), the founding emperor of the dynasty. He was a younger brother of Li Yiji, who also served under Liu Bang as an adviser. Li Shang is generally revered as the founding ancestor of the Li (郦) surname.

== Early life ==
Li Shang was from Gaoyang County (高陽縣), Chenliu Commandery (陳留郡), which is around present-day Qi County, Kaifeng, Henan. Around 209 BC, the Dazexiang uprising broke out, sparking off a series of other rebellions throughout China against the ruling Qin dynasty. Around 208 BC, Li Shang rallied about four thousand followers and led them to join a rebel group led by Liu Bang, then known as the Duke of Pei (沛公), to whom he pledged his allegiance. When Liu Bang's rebel group attacked Changshe, Li Shang was the first to break through the Qin defences and enter the county. For his achievement, he was awarded the title "Lord Xincheng" (信成君) by Liu Bang. After that, he fought under Liu Bang's banner at Goushi (緱氏) and defeated Qin forces at the east of Luoyang. Later, he joined Liu Bang in attacking and capturing Wan (宛), Rang (穰), and 17 other counties. Liu Bang also sent him with a separate force to attack Xun Pass (旬關; east of present-day Xunyang, Shaanxi) and capture Hanzhong.

== Chu–Han Contention ==
After the Qin dynasty was overthrown in 206 BC, the rebels divided China into the Eighteen Kingdoms, with Liu Bang as the King of Han (漢王). Li Shang was formally enfeoffed as "Lord Xincheng" and appointed as the Commandant of Longxi (隴西都尉). During the Han campaign against the Three Qins between 206 and 205 BC, Li Shang was sent to attack Beidi and Shang commanderies, during which he defeated Yong Jiang (雍將) at Yanshi (焉氏), Zhou Lei (周類) at Xunyi (栒邑), and Su Zu (蘇駔) at Niyang (泥陽). For his achievement, he was given 6,000 taxable households in his fief.

Li Shang fought on Liu Bang's side against his rival Xiang Yu during the Chu–Han Contention (206–202 BC), a power struggle between Liu Bang and Xiang Yu for supremacy over China. In one battle at Julu Commandery, he fought fiercely against Xiang Yu's forces under Zhongli Mo, earning himself the appointment of chancellor of the Liang Kingdom and an additional 4,000 taxable households in his fief as his reward. He also fought against Xiang Yu's forces at Huling (胡陵; northeast of present-day Pei County, Jiangsu). The Chu–Han Contention ended with Liu Bang's victory over Xiang Yu at the Battle of Gaixia in 202 BC, after which Liu Bang became emperor and established the Han dynasty as the ruling dynasty in China.

== Service under Liu Bang ==
In the autumn of 202 BC, when a vassal king Zang Tu started a rebellion, Li Shang was appointed as a general by the Han government and sent to attack Zang Tu. He fought Long Tuo (龍脫), one of Zang Tu's lieutenants, and was the first to break through enemy lines and defeat Zang Tu's forces at Yixia (易下). For his achievement, he was appointed Right Imperial Chancellor (右丞相) and given a hereditary marquis title, Marquis of Zhuo (涿侯), with a marquisate of 5,000 taxable households in Zhuo County.

As Right Imperial Chancellor of the Han government, Li Shang continued leading troops in battle against hostile forces, including those in Dai Commandery, and was given an additional appointment as chancellor of the Zhao Kingdom. Along with Zhou Bo, he defeated hostile forces and pacified Dai Commandery, receiving the surrender of Cheng Zong (程縱), Guo Tong (郭同), and 619 other enemy commanders. After returning from the campaign, he was tasked with ensuring the security of Liu Bang's father for a year and seven months.

In 196 BC, Li Shang suppressed a rebellion by Chen Xi, defeating the rebels at Dongyuan (東垣; present-day Dingzhou, Hebei). Later that year, he joined Liu Bang on a campaign against Ying Bu, a vassal king who had started a rebellion, and broke through Ying Bu's lines twice in battle. After the rebellion was suppressed, Li Shang had his marquisate shifted to Quzhou and enlarged to 5,100 taxable households; his title was also correspondingly changed to "Marquis of Quzhou".

== Life under Empress Lü's regency and death ==
After Liu Bang died in 195 BC, Li Shang continued serving under his son and successor Liu Ying (Emperor Hui), who became a puppet ruler under the control of his mother Lü Zhi and her clan. This period is historically known as the Lü Clan Disturbance when the Lüs controlled the Han government. During this time, Li Shang became critically ill, while his son Li Ji (酈寄; also known as Li Kuang 酈況) became close friends with Lü Zhi's nephew, Lü Lu (呂祿).

Following Lü Zhi's death in 180 BC, several Han loyalists launched a coup to oust the Lüs and restore the Lius to power. At the time, Lü Lu was in command of the imperial guards defending Changle Palace (長樂宮) in the Han capital Chang'an (present-day Xi'an, Shaanxi). Zhou Bo, one of the Han loyalists, took the critically ill Li Shang hostage and used him to force Li Ji to trick Lü Lu into exiting Changle Palace, allowing Zhou Bo to enter the palace and seize command of the imperial guards. The Lü clan was exterminated and Liu Heng (Emperor Wen), another of Liu Bang's sons, was installed on the throne as the emperor. Li Shang died in the same year and was given the posthumous title "Marquis Jing" (景侯).

== Descendants ==
Li Shang's son, Li Ji (酈寄), who inherited his father's title and marquisate, was scorned for his betrayal of his friend Lü Lu. During the Rebellion of the Seven States in 154 BC, Liu Qi (Emperor Jing) appointed Li Ji as a general and ordered him to attack the Zhao Principality. Li Ji failed to capture Zhao after a ten-month siege until another Han general Luan Bu (欒布) showed up to assist him; they succeeded in defeating the rebels and the Prince of Zhao committed suicide. Between 149 and 148 BC, when Li Ji wanted to marry Zang Er (臧兒), the emperor's mother-in-law, Emperor Jing turned furious and stripped him of his marquis title.

Emperor Jing then made Li Jian (酈堅; posthumously known as Marquis Jing 靖侯), another of Li Shang's sons, the Marquis of Miao (繆侯), so that Li Shang's descendants could continue to inherit their ancestor's peerage. After Li Jian died, his son Li Suicheng (酈遂成; posthumously known as Marquis Kang 康侯) inherited the marquisate. When Li Suicheng died, his son Li Shizong (酈世宗; posthumously known as Marquis Huai 懷侯) inherited the marquisate. The marquisate was then passed on to Li Shizong's son Li Zhonggen (酈終根), who initially served as Minister of Ceremonies (太常) and was later stripped of his marquis title for committing a crime.
