= Allen Cheng =

Australian professor of medicine

Allen Cheuk-Seng Chen AC
- Education: MBBS (University of Melbourne); PhD (Flinders University); Master of Public Health (Monash University); Master of Biostatistics (University of Queensland)
- Known for: infectious disease research
- Medical career
- Profession: Professor of Medicine
- Institutions: Monash University

Allen Cheuk-Seng Cheng AC is an Australian epidemiologist and professor of medicine. Since 2015, he has been the Professor of Infectious Diseases Epidemiology at Monash University. His area of research is epidemiology, focusing on infectious disease research and public health policy. In 2025, he was awarded the Companion of the Order of Australia for his eminent service to medicine.

== Early life and education ==
Cheng graduated from the University of Melbourne Faculty of Medicine, Dentistry & Health Sciences in 1993.

He also has a PhD (Flinders University), a Master of Public Health (Monash University) and a Master of Biostatistics (University of Queensland).

== Medical career ==
Cheng has been Professor of Infectious Diseases Epidemiology within the Monash University Department of Epidemiology and Preventive Medicine since 2015.

During the COVID-19 pandemic, he served as the state of Victoria's Deputy Chief Health Officer and he chaired the Target Vaccine Advisory Group. He was also co-chair of coronavirus vaccines for the Australian Technical Advisory Group on Immunisation (ATAGI).

Since 2023, he has been the Director of Infectious Diseases at Monash Health. Previously, he served as the Director of Infection Prevention and Healthcare Epidemiology at Alfred Health. Before his tenure at Alfred Health, Cheng worked as an infectious diseases physician in regional locations such as Darwin and Geelong, as well as internationally in Thailand, Papua New Guinea, the United States, and Finland.

== Awards and recognition ==
In the 2025 Australia Day Honours, Cheng was awarded Australia's highest civilian honour, Companion of the Order of Australia, "for eminent service to medicine as an epidemiologist, to infectious and communicable disease research and education, and to national and international public health policy".

Other recognition includes:

2008 Sir Richard Stawell Memorial Award, Australian Medical Association (Victoria).
2012 Frank Fenner Award for Advanced Research in Infectious Diseases, Australasian Society for Infectious Diseases.
2014 National Health and Medical Research Council Excellence Award and Level 2 Clinical Fellowship.
2018 WG Smith Fellow, Visiting Lecturer, Sir Charles Gairdner Hospital.

== Personal life ==
Cheng is the son of migrant parents, who came to Australia from Malaysia and Hong Kong in the 1950s and 1960s. His father died during the COVID-19 pandemic.

== Publications ==
As of March 2025, Scopus lists 535 publications, which have been cited 29,107 times, and an h-index of 76. Google Scholar lists 46,012 citations to his works, and an h-index of 94.
