= Chinese surname =

Surnames used by Han Chinese and Sinicized ethnic groups

Chinese surnames are used by Han Chinese and Sinicized ethnic groups in Greater China, Korea, Vietnam and among overseas Chinese communities around the world such as Singapore and Malaysia. Chinese names begin with surnames, unlike the Western tradition in which surnames are given last. Around 2,000 Han Chinese surnames are currently in use, but the great proportion of Han Chinese people use only a relatively small number of these surnames; 19 surnames are used by around half of the Han Chinese people, while 100 surnames are used by around 87% of the population. A report in 2019 gives the most common Chinese surnames as Wang and Li, each shared by over 100 million people in China. The remaining eight of the top ten most common Chinese surnames are Zhang, Liu, Chen, Yang, Huang, Zhao, Wu and Zhou.

Two distinct types of Chinese surnames existed in ancient China, namely xing (Chinese: 姓; pinyin: xìng; Wade–Giles: hsing), which were matrilineal, and shi (Chinese: 氏; pinyin: shì; Wade–Giles: shih), which were patrilineal. Later, the two terms were used interchangeably, and in the present day, xing refers to the surname and shi may refer either the clan or maiden name. The two terms may also be used together as xingshi for family names or surnames. Most Chinese surnames (xing) in current use were originally shi. The earliest xing surname might be matrilinear, but Han Chinese family name has been almost exclusively patrilineal for a couple of millennia, passing from father to children. This system of patrilineal surnames is unusual in the world in its long period of continuity and depth of written history, and Chinese people may view their surnames as part of their shared kinship and Han Chinese identity. Women do not normally change their surnames upon marriage, except sometimes in places with more western influences such as Hong Kong. Traditionally Chinese surnames have been exogamous in that people tend to marry those with different surnames.

The most common Chinese surnames were compiled in the Song dynasty work Hundred Family Surnames, which lists over 400 names. The colloquial expressions lǎobǎixìng (老百姓; lit. "old hundred surnames") and bǎixìng (wikt:百姓, lit. "hundred surnames") are used in Chinese to mean "ordinary folks", "the people", or "commoners".

== History ==
Chinese surnames have a history of over 3,000 years. Chinese mythology, however, reaches back further to the legendary emperor Fu Hsi (with the surname Feng), who was said to have established the system of Chinese surnames to distinguish different families and prevent marriage of people with the same family names. Prior to the Warring States period (fifth century BC), only the ruling families and the aristocratic elite had surnames. Historically there was a difference between ancestral clan names or xing (姓) and branch lineage names or shi (氏). Xing may be the more ancient surname that referred to the ancestral tribe or clan, while shi denoted a branch of the tribe or clan. For example, the ancestors of the Shang had Zi (子) as xing, but the descendants were subdivided into numerous shi including Yin (殷), Song (宋), Kong (空), Tong (同) and others. The distinction between the two began to be blurred by the Warring States period. During the Qin dynasty, name usage was standardised, commoners started to acquire a surname or xing, and the shi also became xing. By the Han dynasty, families only had xing or xing-shi. The great majority of Han Chinese surnames (now called xing or xingshi) that survive to modern times have their roots in shi rather than the ancient xing.

In modern usage, xing is the surname, but the word shi survives as a word to refer to the clan. The term shi may be appended to the surname of a person; for example, a man with the Zhang surname may be referred to as Zhang-shi instead of his full name. It is used in particular for the paternal surname of a married woman, therefore in this case shi means maiden name, which a Chinese woman would continue to use after marriage.

=== Xing ===
The character for xing with the female radical 女 in red

The ancient xing were surnames held by the noble clans. They generally contain a "female" (Chinese: 女; pinyin: nǚ) radical, for example Ji (姬), Jiang (姜), Yao (姚) and Yíng (嬴). This is taken as evidence that they originated from matriarchal societies based on maternal lineages. The character for xing itself is composed of a female radical and the character for "give birth" (生; shēng). Xing is believed to have been originally transmitted through women of noble birth, while noble men have shi.

Scholars such as Edwin G. Pulleyblank, however, are unconvinced by the matriarchy theory of Chinese surnames due to a lack of independent evidence. An alternative hypothesis has been proposed, suggesting that the use of female radical in xing may have arisen from the clan exogamy system used during the Zhou dynasty (the words xing and shi also did not exist in the Shang dynasty oracle bones). In ancient times, people of the same xing were not permitted to marry each other and a woman married into an aristocratic clan needed to be of a different name. Based on observation of the evolution of characters in oracular scripture from the Shang dynasty through the Zhou: the 女 radical seems to appear during the Zhou period next to Shang sinograms indicating a clan or a tribe. This combination seems to designate specifically a female and could mean "lady of such or such clan". The structure of the xing sinogram could reflect the fact that in the royal court of Zhou, at least in the beginning, only females (wives married into the Zhou family from other clans) were called by their birth clan name, while the men were usually designated by their title or fief.

While people of the same xing were not permitted to marry each other, those with the same shi can. By the Han dynasty when everyone had xing and the surname was transmitted paternally, the practice continued, but it had changed to marriage between families of men on the paternal side being prohibited, but not on the maternal side.

=== Shi ===
Prior to the Qin dynasty (3rd century BC), China was largely a fengjian (feudal) society. As fiefdoms were divided and subdivided among descendants, so additional sub-surnames known as shi were created to distinguish between noble lineages according to seniority, though in theory they shared the same ancestor. In this way, a nobleman would hold a shi and a xing. Xing, however, was more important than shi.

The difference between xing and shi became blurred in the Spring and Autumn period starting with women. For example: Chunqiu referred to Duke Xuan of Lu's consort Lady Mujiang (穆姜), who bore the clan name (姓, xing) Jiang, as Jiangshi 姜氏, "[lady of the] Jiang shi".

After the states of China were unified by Qin Shi Huang in 221 BC, surnames gradually spread to the lower classes. Most surnames that survive to the present day were originally shi.

=== Origins of Chinese surnames ===
According to the chapter on surnames in the Han dynasty work Fengsu Tong – Xingshi Pian (風俗通姓氏篇), there are 9 origins of Chinese surnames: dynasty names, posthumous titles, ranks of nobility, state names, official positions, style names, places of residence, occupations, and events. Modern scholars such as Kiang Kang-Hu proposed that there are 18 sources from which Chinese surnames may be derived, while others suggested at least 24. These may be names associated with a ruling dynasty such as the various titles and names of rulers, nobility and dynasty, or they may be place names of various territories, districts, towns, villages, and specific locations, the title of official posts or occupations, or names of objects, or they may be derived from the names of family members or clans, and in a few cases, names of contempt given by a ruler.

The following are some of the common sources:

1. Xing: These were usually reserved for the central lineage of the ancient royal family, with collateral lineages taking their own shi. The traditional description was what were known as the "Eight Great Xings of High Antiquity" (上古八大姓), namely Jiāng (姜), Jī (姬), Yáo (姚), Yíng (嬴), Sì (姒), Yún (妘), Guī (媯) and Rèn (妊), though some sources quote Jí (姞) as the last one instead of Rèn. Of these xing, only Jiang and Yao have survived in their original form to modern days as frequently occurring surnames, while few others, like Ji, Yun and Ren, survived in forms without the female radical: 吉, 云 and 任.
2. State name: Many nobles and commoners took the name of their state, either to show their continuing allegiance or as a matter of national and ethnic identity. These are some of the most common Chinese surnames in the present day such as Wú (吳, 9th most common), Zhōu (周, 10th most common)
3. Name of a fief or place of origin: Fiefdoms were often granted to collateral branches of the aristocracy and it was natural as part of the process of sub-surnaming for their names to be used. An example is Di, Marquis of Ouyang Village, whose descendants took the surname Ouyang (歐陽). There are some two hundred examples of this identified, often of two-character surnames, but few have survived to the present. Some families acquired their surname during the Han dynasty from the Commandery they resided in.
4. Names of an ancestor: Like the previous example, this was also a common origin with close to 500 or 600 examples, 200 of which are two-character surnames. Often an ancestor's courtesy name would be used. For example, Yuan Taotu took the second character of his grandfather's courtesy name Boyuan (伯爰) as his surname. Sometimes titles granted to ancestors could also be taken as surnames.
5. Seniority within the family: In ancient usage, the characters zhong (仲), shu (叔) and ji (季) were used to denote the second, third and fourth (or last) eldest sons in a family. For the first son meng (孟) was meant for a child born to a secondary wife or a concubine, while bo 伯 indicated a child born to the primary wife. These were sometimes adopted as surnames. Of these, Meng is the best known, being the surname of the philosopher Mencius.
6. Official positions, such as Shǐ (史, "historian"), Jí (籍, "royal librarian"), Líng (凌, "ice master"), Cāng (倉, "granary manager"), Kù (庫, "store manager"), Jiàn (諫, "adviser"), Shàngguān (上官, "high official"), Tàishǐ (太史, "grand historian"), Zhōngháng (中行, "commander of middle column"), Yuèzhèng (樂正, "chief musician"), and in the case of Shang's "Five Officials" (五官), namely Sīmǎ (司馬, "minister of horses", akin to defence minister, almost of the exact same etymological origin of the English title/surname Steward), Sītú (司徒, "minister of the masses", akin to treasurer), Sīkōng (司空, "minister of works", akin to minister of infrastructure), Sīshì (司士, "minister of yeomen", akin to chief ombudsman) and Sīkòu (司寇, "minister of bandits", akin to attorney general);
7. General occupations, as with Táo (陶, "potter"), Tú (屠, "butcher"), Bǔ (卜, "diviner"), Jiàng (匠, "craftsman"), Wū (巫, "shaman") and Chú (廚, "cook").
8. Titles of nobility, such as Wáng (王, "king"), Hóu (侯, "marquis"), Xiàhóu (夏侯, "Marquis of Xia") and Gōngsūn (公孫, "Duke's grandchild")
9. Royal decree by the Emperor, such as Kuang (鄺), bestowed amongst other gifts to Kuang Yuping, previously Fang Yuping (方愈平), by Emperor Xiaozong of Song, upon making Yuping's daughter an imperial concubine.
10. Ethnic and religious groups: Non-Han Chinese peoples in China sometimes took the name of their ethnic groups as sinicized surnames, such as Hú (胡, "barbarian"), Jīn (金, "Jurchen"), Mǎn (滿, "Manchu"), Dí (狄, "Di people"), Huí (回, "Hui people") and Mùróng (慕容, a Xianbei tribe). Many Hui Muslims adopted the surname Ma (馬), an old Chinese surname, when they were required to use Chinese surnames during the Ming dynasty as it sounded close to the first syllable of Mohammad; it was also fitting for some of those who were caravaneers as the word means "horse".
11. Famous people: A couple of surnames originate from famous people in Chinese history. For example, the surname 李 originates from Lao Tzu. This probably means that people today with the surname 李 are mostly descendants of Lao Tzu, including the Tang emperors.

Many also changed their surnames throughout history for a number of reasons.

- A ruler may bestow his own surname on those he considered to have given outstanding service to him; for example, the surname Liu (劉) was granted by emperors in the Han dynasty, Li (李) during the Tang dynasty, and Zhao (趙) from the Song dynasty.
- Others, however, may avoid using the name of a ruler, for example Shi (師) was changed to Shuai (帥) to avoid conflict with the name of Sima Shi. Others may modify their name in order to escape from their enemies at times of turmoil, for example Duanmu (端木) to Mu (木 and 沐), and Gong (共) to Gong (龔).
- The name may also be changed by simplification of the writing, e.g. Mu (幕) to Mo (莫), or reducing from double or multiple character names to single character names, e.g. Duangan (段干) to Duan (段).
- It may also have occurred through error, or changed due to a dissatisfaction with the name (e.g. Ai 哀, "sorrow", to Zhong 衷, "heartfelt feeling").

== Usage ==
Chinese surnames or family names are written before the first name or given name. Therefore, someone named Wei (伟) from the Zhang (张) family is called "Zhang Wei" (张伟) and not "Wei Zhang". Chinese women generally retain their maiden name and use their name unchanged after marriage, but in modern times in some communities, some women may choose to attach their husband's surname to the front. Chinese surname is patrilinear where the father's surname is passed on to his children, but more recently some people have opted to use both parents' surnames; although this practice has increased in recent times, it is still relatively uncommon in China, with those who adopted both parents' surnames numbering at only 1.1 million in 2018 (up from 118,000 in 1990). Adoption of maternal surnames is known to have been occurred historically; in Taiwan, some matrilineal surnames may have arisen due to occupation by Japan where such practice was more common.

Some Chinese outside of mainland China, particularly those from the Chinese immigrant communities around the world and those who have acquired a Christian or Western first name, have adopted the Western convention when giving their name in English, placing their surname last. Examples of those commonly known in the West include Jackie Chan (Chinese name Chan Kong-sang), Jimmy Choo (Chinese name Choo Yeang Keat), and Yo-Yo Ma. Those with a Western first name can write their name in English in various ways – some may add the Western first name in front and the Chinese given name last (the surname is therefore in the middle), or fully Westernised with both the Western and Chinese given names before the Chinese surname. Examples include Carrie Lam, originally named Cheng Yuet-ngor (Cheng is the surname), but who has acquired her husband's surname Lam and a Western first name as Carrie Lam Cheng Yuet-ngor.

Due to the different spelling conventions and Chinese varieties as well as the different spelling preferences in the various countries these Chinese find themselves in, many people of the same Chinese surname can appear differently when written in English, for example the Lin surname (林) may also appear as Lam (Cantonese) or Lim (Hokkien). Some Chinese surnames that appear to be the same written in English may also be different in Chinese due to different characters having the same or similar pronunciations, dialectal differences, or non-standard romanizations (see section on variation in romanization below).

== Distribution of surnames ==
Regions with high concentration of particular surnames
Region	Surnames
Liaoning	Zhang (张/張), Jiang (江)
Guangdong	Liang/Leung (梁), Luo (罗/羅), Kuang (邝/鄺), Chan/Chen (陈/陳), Huang/Wong (黄/黃)
Guangxi	Liang (梁), Lu (陆/陸), Zhang/Chong (章), Huang (黄/黃)
Fujian	Zheng (郑/鄭), Lin (林), Huang (黄/黃), Xǔ (许/許), Xie (谢/謝),
Hainan	Fú (符)
Anhui	Wang (汪)
Jiangsu	Xú (徐), Zhu (朱)
Shanghai	Wang (王), Yang (杨/楊)
Zhejiang	Mao (毛), Shen (沈)
Jiangxi	Hu (胡)
Hubei	Hu (胡)
Hunan	Tan/Tom (谭/譚), Huang (黄/黃)
Sichuan	He (何), Deng (邓/鄧)
Guizhou	Wu (吴/吳)
Yunnan	Yang (杨/楊)
Henan	Cheng (程)
Gansu	Gao (高)
Ningxia	Wan (万/萬)
Shaanxi	Xue (薛)
Qinghai	Bao (鲍/鮑)
Xinjiang	Ma (马/馬)
Shandong	Kong (孔)
Shanxi	Dong (董) and Guo (郭)
Inner Mongolia	Pan (潘)
Northeast China	Yu (于)

Surnames are not evenly distributed throughout China's geography. In northern China, Wáng (王) is the most common surname, being shared by 9.9% of the population. Next are Lǐ (李), Zhāng (张/張) and Liú (刘/劉). In the south, Chén (陈/陳) is the most common, being shared by 10.6% of the population. Next are Lǐ (李), Huáng (黄/黃), Lín (林) and Zhāng (张/張). Around the major crossing points of the Yangzi River, the most common surname is Lĭ (李), taking up 7.7%, followed by Wáng (王), Zhāng (张/張), Chan/Chén (陈/陳) and Liú (刘/劉).

A 1987 study showed over 450 family names in common use in Beijing, but there were fewer than 300 family names in Fujian. Furthermore, a 2012 study found that there was the lowest amount of isonymy in surnames among the population around middle and lower reaches of Yangtze River both on the provincial and county levels. Additionally, it was found that counties with the highest values of isonymy were distributed in the provinces with high proportions of ethnic minorities. According to the dendrogram of surname distances, several clusters could be identified. Most provinces in a cluster were conterminous with one another. The one exception to this pattern could be explained by demic migration observed where the Han Chinese migrated to Northeastern China.

A study by geneticist Yuan Yida has found that of all the people with a particular surname, there tends to be a population concentration in a certain province, as tabulated to the right. It does not show, however, the most common surnames in any one province.

The 55th most common family name "Xiào" (肖) appears to be very rare in Hong Kong. This is explained by the fact Hong Kong uses traditional Chinese characters rather than simplified Chinese characters. Originally, the surname 蕭 (Xiāo) was rather common while the surname 肖 (Xiào) was extremely rare, if not non-existent (it is mentioned only sporadically in historical texts). The first round of simplification in 1956 simplified 蕭 into 萧, keeping 蕭/萧 and 肖 distinct. However the second-round in 1977, which has long been abolished, merged 萧 and 肖 into 肖. Despite the retraction of the second round, some people have kept 肖 as their surname, so that there are now two separate surnames, 萧 and 肖.

Chén (陈/陳) is perhaps the most common surname in Hong Kong and Macau, where it is romanized as Chan. It is the most common Chinese surname in Singapore, where it is usually romanized as Tan, and is also common in Taiwan, where it is romanized as Chén.

Fāng (方), which is only the 47th most common overall, is much more common in San Francisco's Chinatown in the United States, although the surname is more often than not romanized as Fong, as based on Yue Chinese. As with the concentration of family names, this can also be explained statistically, as a person with an uncommon name moving to an unsettled area and leaving his family name to large number of descendants.

After the Song dynasty, surname distributions in China largely settled down. The Kuàng (邝/鄺) family, for example, migrated from the northern capital and settled in Guangdong after the Song dynasty revolts. Villages are often made up of a single patrilineage with individuals having the same surname, often with a common male ancestor. They usually intermarry with others from nearby villages, creating genetic clusters.

== Surnames at present ==
Of the thousands of surnames which have been identified from historical texts prior to the modern era, most have either been lost (see extinction of family names) or simplified. Historically there are close to 12,000 surnames recorded including those from non-Han Chinese ethnic groups, of which only about 3,100 are in current use, a factor of almost 4:1 (about 75%) reduction. A 2019 figure however put the total number of Chinese family names at 6,150. Of Han Chinese surnames, the largest number ever recorded was 6,363 (3,730 single-character surnames, 2,633 multiple-character surnames), around 2,000 of which are still in use. Chinese Surname extinction is due to various factors, such as people taking the names of their rulers, orthographic simplifications, taboos against using characters from an emperor's name, and others. A recent example of near surname extinction is the rare surname Shan (𢒉). The character may not be displayed on computer systems used by government officials, and people born after the system change as well as people who want to avoid possible problems changed their name to another character such as Xian (冼). The name is still used by the older people, but some people from the village are concerned that future generations will forget their name origin.

While new names have arisen for various reasons, this has been outweighed by old names disappearing. The most significant factor affecting the surname frequency is other ethnic groups identifying as Han and adopting Han names. In recent centuries some two-character surnames have often dropped a character. Since the founding of the People's Republic of China, moreover, some surnames have been graphically simplified.

Although there are thousands of Chinese family names, the 100 most common, which together make up less than 5% of those in existence, are shared by 85% of the population. The three most common surnames in Mainland China are Li, Wang and Zhang, which make up 7.9%, 7.4% and 7.1% respectively. Together they number close to 300 million and are easily the most common surnames in the world. In Chinese, the phrase "third son of Zhang, fourth son of Li" (Chinese: 张三李四; pinyin: Zhāng sān Lǐ sì) is used to mean "just anybody".

In a 1990 study, the top 200 family names accounted for over 96% of a random sample of 174,900 persons, with over 500 other names accounting for the remaining 4%. In a different study (1987), which combined data from Taiwan and China (sample size of 570,000 persons), the top 19 names covered 55.6%, and the top 100 names covered 87% of the sample. Other data suggest that the top 50 names comprise 70% of the population.

Most commonly occurring Chinese family names have only one character; however, about twenty double-character family names have survived into modern times. These include Sima (司 馬, simp. 司 马), Zhuge (諸 葛, simp. 诸 葛), Ouyang (歐 陽, simp. 欧 阳), occasionally romanized as O'Young, suggesting an Irish origin to English-speakers, and Situ (or Sito 司 徒). Sima, Zhuge, and Ouyang also happen to be the surnames of four well-known pre-modern Chinese historical figures. There are family names with three or more characters, but usually those are not ethnically Han Chinese. For example, Aixinjueluo (愛新覺羅, also romanized from the Manchu language as Aisin Gioro), was the family name of the Manchu royal family of the Qing dynasty. The longest recorded surname written using hanzi characters is Lunalouyugumuzheshuduotumuku'adebu'axi (Chinese: 魯納婁于古母遮熟多吐母苦啊德補啊喜; pinyin: Lǔnàlóuyúgǔmǔzhēshúduōtǔmǔkǔ'ādébǔ'āxǐ), an extremely rare surname reportedly used by members of the Yi ethnic group in Yunnan province, with seventeen characters in total.

=== Variations in romanization ===
Transliteration of Chinese family names (see List of common Chinese surnames) into foreign languages poses a number of problems. Chinese surnames are shared by people speaking a number of varieties which often have different pronunciations of their surnames. The spread of the Chinese diaspora into all parts of the world resulted in the Romanization of the surnames based on different languages and Chinese varieties. Countries that have adopted the system of Chinese surnames such as Vietnam and Korea also spell them according to their own pronunciations. As a result, it is common for the same surname to be transcribed differently. For example, the Chen (陳) surname can appear as Chan (Cantonese, e.g. Jackie Chan), Tan (Hokkien), Tang (Teochew), Chin (Hakka and Korean), Trần (Vietnamese) and others; the Li (李) surname may appear as Lee (an example is Lee Kuan Yew), the Zhou (周) surname can appear as Chou, Chew, Jew and many others (e.g. Wakin Chau and Jimmy Choo); while the Zheng surname (鄭/郑) can be romanized into Chang, Cheng, Chung, Teh, Tay, Tee, Tsang, Zeng or Zheng (in pinyin, Chang, Cheng, Zheng and Zeng are all different names). In some Chinese varieties, different surnames could be homonyms so it is common for family names to appear ambiguous when transliterated. Translating Chinese surnames from foreign transliteration often presents ambiguity. For example, the surname "Li" are all Mandarin-based pinyin transliteration for the surnames Lí (黎); Lǐ (李, 理 and 里); and Lì (郦/酈, 栗, 厉/厲, and 利) depending on the tone which is usually omitted in foreign transliterations.

Due to the different pronunciations and romanizations, it is sometimes easy to tell whether a Chinese person has origins in mainland China, Hong Kong, Macau, Indonesia, Malaysia, the Philippines, Singapore, or Taiwan. Generally, people of Mainland descent will have their surnames and names in pinyin. Those from Taiwan use Wade-Giles romanization. People from Southeast Asia (mainly Thailand, Malaysia, Indonesia, and the Philippines) and Hong Kong usually base their romanization of surnames and names on the Min, Hakka and Cantonese languages. The younger generation from Singapore often has their surname in a non-Mandarin variety (Hokkien, Teochew, Hainanese, Cantonese, and Hakka) and given names in English, Mandarin, or both.

Some people use non-standard romanizations, e.g. the Hong Kong media mogul 邵逸夫 Run Run Shaw's surname 邵 is spelt as Shaw (Shao in pinyin).

The use of different systems of romanization based on different Chinese language variants from 1900~1970 also contributed to the variations.

Some examples:

Written form	Pinyin (Mainland China)	Wade-Giles (Taiwan)	Hokkien / Teochew / Hakka (Indonesia / Malaysia / Singapore / Philippines)	Cantonese (HK / Macau / Singapore / Malaysia)	Korean (Korea)	Vietnamese (Vietnam)	Surname meaning / origin (major if multiple)
陈 / 陳	Chen	Ch'en	Tan / Tan, Tang / Chin, Tjhin	Chan	Jin	Trần	Vintage, State of Chen
关 / 關	Guan	Kuan	Kwang / Kweng / Kan	Kwan	Guan	Quan	gate, gateway, mountain pass, originated as a title for guards in mountain passes
何	He	Ho	Ho /Ho / Ho	Ho	Ha	Ho	carry; what; how; why; which, Han(韩) misheard as He(何) in Jianghuai Mandarin
黄 / 黃	Huang	Huang	Ng, Wee / " / Wong, Bong	Wong	Hwang	Hoang	Yellow, State of Huang
简 / 簡	Jian	Chien	Kan / Kam, Kang / Kan	Kan/Gan	Gan	Giản	Simple, descendants of State of Jin doctor Xu Jianbo (续简伯)
金	Jin	Chin	Kim / Kim / Kim / Kiem	Kam	Gim	Kim	Gold, one of the five phases (metal) in Wuxing Philosophy
林	Lin	Lin	Lim / Lim / Lim / Liem	Lam	Im (South); Rim (North)	Lâm	Forest, Quan, son of Bi Gan was born in the woods during his family's exile, thus bestowed by Wu of Zhou with the surname Lin
王	Wang	Wang	Ong / Heng / Wung / Wong	Wong	Wang	Vương	King or Prince, Used mainly by descendants of royalties
吴 / 吳	Wu	Wu	Goh, Go / Goh / Ng	Ng	O	Ngô	State of Wu
许 / 許	Xu	Hsü	Koh / " / Hee, See	Hui/Hua	Heo	Hứa	To allow, State of Xu
张 / 張	Zhang	Chang/Zhang	Teo / " / Tjong, Chong	Cheung	Jang	Trương	Verb, to draw a bow, surname bestowed upon fletchers by the Yellow Emperor
赵 / 趙	Zhao	Chao	Teow / Tey / Chao	Chiu	Jo	Triệu	State of Zhao

In Malaysia, Singapore, Indonesia, Philippines et alibi, various spellings are used depending on name origin. See List of common Chinese surnames for the different spellings and more examples.

== Sociological use of surnames ==
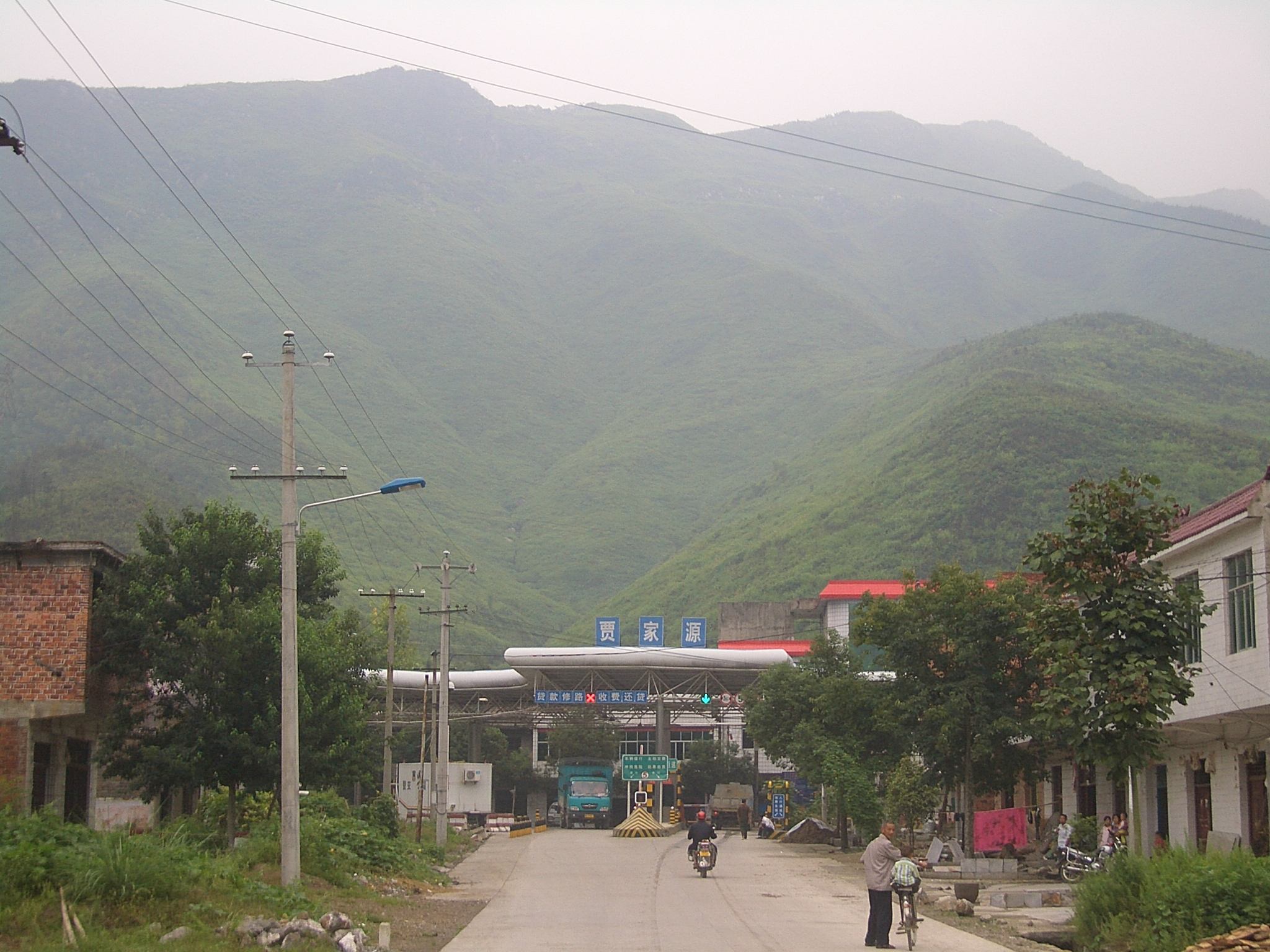
Many village names in China are linked to surnames. Pictured is Jiajiayuan (贾家源), i.e. "Jia Family's Spring", in Honggang Town, Tongshan County, Hubei

Throughout most of Chinese history, surnames have served sociological functions. Because of their association with the aristocratic elite in their early developments, surnames were often used as symbols of nobility. Thus nobles would use their surnames to be able to trace their ancestry and compete for seniority in terms of hereditary rank. Examples of early genealogies among the royalty can be found in Sima Qian's Historical Records, which contain tables recording the descent lines of noble houses called shibiao (Chinese: 世表; pinyin: shìbiǎo).

Later, during the Han dynasty, these tables were used by prominent families to glorify themselves and sometimes even to legitimize their political power. For example, Cao Pi, who forced the abdication of the last Han emperor in his favor, claimed descent from the Yellow Emperor. Chinese emperors sometimes passed their own surnames to subjects as honors. Unlike European practice in which some surnames are obviously noble, Chinese emperors and members of the royal family had regular surnames except in cases where they came from non-Han ethnic groups. This was a result of Chinese imperial theory in which a commoner could receive the Mandate of Heaven and become emperor. Upon becoming emperor, the emperor would retain his original surname. Also as a consequence, many people also had the same surname as the emperor, but had no direct relation to the royal family.

The Tang dynasty was the last period when the great aristocratic families, mostly descended from the nobility of pre-Qin states, held significant centralized and regional power. The surname was used as a source of prestige and common allegiance. During the period many genealogical records called pudie (simplified Chinese: 谱牒; traditional Chinese: 譜牒; pinyin: pǔdié) were compiled to trace the complex descent lines of families or clans and their marriage ties to other families or clans. Many of these were collected by Ouyang Xiu in his New History of Tang. To differentiate between different surnames, the Tang also choronyms before stating beforehand, for example Lǒngxī Lǐshì 隴西李氏, meaning Li of Longxi. These were generally the names of commanderies used prior to the reorganization during the Tang, so that they became exclusively associated to clans as their common use had died out. Cadet branches were also listed for further differentiation, such as Gūzāng Fáng 姑臧房, meaning Clan Li of Guzang.

During the Song dynasty, ordinary clans began to organize themselves into corporate units and produce genealogies. This trend was led by the poet Su Shi and his father. As competition for resources and positions in the bureaucracy intensified, individuals used their common ancestry and surname to promote solidarity. They established schools to educate their sons and held common lands to aid disadvantaged families. Ancestral temples were also erected to promote surname identity. Clan cohesion was usually encouraged by successive imperial governments since it aided in social stability. During the Qing dynasty surname associations often undertook extrajudicial roles, providing primitive legal and social security functions. They played important roles in the Chinese diaspora to South-East Asia and elsewhere, providing the infrastructure for the establishment of trading networks. In southern China, however, clans sometimes engaged in armed conflict in competition for land. Clans continued the tradition of tracing their ancestry to the distant past as a matter of prestige. Most of these origin myths, though well established, are spurious.

As a result of the importance of surnames, rules and traditions regarding family and marriage grew increasingly complex. For example, in Taiwan, there is a clan with the so-called "double Liao" surname. The story is that "Chang Yuan-zih of Liao's in Siluo married the only daughter of Liao San-Jiou-Lang who had no son, and he took the oath that he should be in the name of Liao when alive and should be in the name of Chang after death." In some places, there are additional taboos against marriage between people of the same surname, considered to be closely related. Conversely, in some areas, there are different clans with the same surname which are not considered to be related, but even in these cases surname exogamy is generally practiced.

Surname identity and solidarity has declined markedly since the 1930s with the decline of Confucianism and later, the rise of Communism in Mainland China. During the Cultural Revolution, surname culture was actively persecuted by the government with the destruction of ancestral temples and genealogies. Moreover, the influx of Western culture and forces of globalization have also contributed to erode the previous sociological uses of the Chinese surnames.

== Common Chinese surnames ==
=== Mainland China ===
According to a comprehensive survey of residential permits released by the Chinese Ministry of Public Security on 24 April 2007, the ten most common surnames in mainland China are Wang (王), Li (李), Zhang (张), Liu (刘), Chen (陈), Yang (杨), Huang (黄), Zhao (赵), Wu (吴), and Zhou (周). The same names were also found (in slightly different orders) by a fairly comprehensive survey of 296 million people in 2006, and by the 1982 census. The top 100 surnames cover 84.77% of China's population. The top 10 surnames each have populations greater than 20 million. The MPS survey revealed that the top 3 surnames in China have a combined population larger than Indonesia, the world's fourth-most-populous country.

The 2019 report by Chinese Ministry of Public Security gives the surnames Wang and Li as the most common ones, with each shared by over 100 million people in China. Each of the most common 23 surnames in China has more than 10 million users.

A commonly cited fact from the 1990 edition of the Guinness Book of World Records estimated that Zhang was the most common surname in the world, but no comprehensive information from China was available at the time and more recent editions have omitted the claim.

=== Taiwan ===
Distribution of Taiwanese surnames
1. 陳 Chen (11.1%)
2. 林 Lin (8.28%)
3. 黃 Huang (6.01%)
4. 張 Chang (5.26%)
5. 李 Lee (5.11%)
6. 王 Wang (4.12%)
7. 吳 Wu (4.04%)
8. 劉 Liu (3.17%)
9. 蔡 Tsai (2.91%)
10. 楊 Yang (2.66%)
11. Other (47.4%)

According to a comprehensive survey of residential permits released by the Taiwanese Ministry of the Interior's Department of Population in February 2005, the ten most common surnames in Taiwan are Chen (陳), Lin (林), Huang (黃), Chang or Zhang (張), Lee or Li (李), Wang (王), Wu (吳), Liu (劉), Tsai (蔡), and Yang (楊).

Taiwanese surnames include some local variants like Tu (塗), which do not even appear among the Hundred Family Surnames, as well as a number of recently created names that are fusions of various conventional surnames like Changchien (張簡) and Chiangfan (姜范). However, names in Taiwan show less diversity than China as a whole: the top ten comprise 52.63% of the Taiwanese population and the top hundred 96.11%. There were also only 1,989 surnames recorded by the Ministry's survey, against China's four or five thousand.

As is typical of China as a whole, these surnames conflate many different lineages and origins, although tradition may bind them to the same ancestral temples and rituals or ban intermarriage. For example, some Taiwanese converts to Presbyterianism adopted the name Kai (偕, pinyin Xié) in honor of the Canadian missionary George Leslie Mackay (馬偕, Pe̍h-ōe-jī Má-kai).

== See also ==
- Art name
- Chinese clan
- Chinese compound surname
- Chinese given name
- Chinese name
- Courtesy name
- Exogamy
- Generation name
- Hundred Family Surnames
- Japanese name
- Korean name
- List of common Chinese surnames
- Naming laws in the People's Republic of China
- Onomastics
- Vietnamese name
