= Vaccine Damage Payment =

UK compensation for adverse reactions to vaccines

The Vaccine Damage Payment is a provision of the welfare state in the United Kingdom that provides a payment of £120,000, as of 2023, for people who can show that they have suffered a vaccine injury.

The payment can also be applied for on behalf of someone who has died after becoming severely disabled because of certain vaccinations.

Vaccine Damage Payments are not a compensation scheme, which means that legal action to claim compensation can also be taken, even if a Vaccine Damage Payment has been received.

== Description ==
The Vaccine Damage Payment programme was created in 1979 to provide significant payment to people who are severely disabled as a result of vaccinations against certain diseases. It is a UK statutory programme, and it is not necessary to demonstrate negligence in order to qualify.

Between 1997 and 2005, the government of the United Kingdom paid £3.5m, in 35 payments of £100,000 each, to patients who were left disabled by vaccinations. An FOI (Freedom of Information application) to The Department for Work and Pensions (DWP) was made in 2019. The DWP's response states that up until May 2019 £74,690,000 has been paid out from the fund, and 941 claims have been successful.

=== Covid Inquiry ===
In 2026, the Covid Inquiry recommended doubling payouts to victims and bereaved families of Covid vaccines, highlighting the need for greater support and recognition for those affected by vaccine-related injuries or deaths. The study showed that previous governments did not revamp the Vaccine Damage Payment Scheme (VDPS) whereby applicants had to show 60 percent impairment in order to qualify for compensation, given that percentage-based calculation is not suitable for neurologial side effects of Covid vaccines. Baroness Heather Hallett recommended that the maximum payout should exceed £200,000 as of December 2025 and more victims should be eligible for assistance, citing the scheme as "inadequate" and "insufficiently supportive". In response to the study, former vaccine minister Nadhim Zahawi urged the UK government to overhaul its support framework to provide more substantial financial assistance.

== Qualifications ==
To qualify for the programme, a person must be severely disabled as a result of a vaccination, and the disablement must be assessed as at least 60%. The state will still pay even if the vaccination was not administered by them. Additionally, a person can still qualify if a vaccine against one of the diseases listed below was administered to the claimant's mother while the mother was pregnant. The claimant may also qualify if they have been in close physical contact with someone who had an oral vaccine against poliomyelitis.

The vaccination must have been for one of the following diseases:

- diphtheria
- tetanus
- pertussis (whooping cough)
- poliomyelitis
- measles
- mumps
- rubella (German measles)
- tuberculosis (TB)
- haemophilus influenzae type B (HIB)
- meningococcal group C (meningitis C)
- pneumococcal infection
- human papillomavirus
- pandemic influenza A (H1N1) 2009 (swine flu) - up to 31 August 2010
- smallpox - up to 1 August 1971
- Coronavirus (COVID-19)

The vaccination must also have been administered before the claimant's 18th birthday, unless the vaccination was administered during an outbreak of disease in the United Kingdom or the Isle of Man, or if it was a vaccine for poliomyelitis, rubella, Meningococcal Group C, human papillomavirus, pandemic influenza A (H1N1) 2009 (swine flu) or COVID-19. The vaccination must have been administered in the United Kingdom or the Isle of Man, or as part of Armed Forces medical treatment.

In 2018, the Department of Health and Social Care conceded that the age restriction wrongly excluded adults from the programme.

== See also ==
- National Vaccine Injury Compensation Program - the no-fault system for litigating vaccine injury claims in the USA
