= Standing Committee on Vaccination =

Scientific committee

Standing Committee on Vaccination at the Robert Koch Institute
- Ständige Impfkommission am Robert-Koch-Institut

Agency overview
- Formed: 1972
- Jurisdiction: Germany
- Agency executive: Thomas Mertens, Chair
- Parent department: Robert Koch Institute
- Website: www.rki.de/EN/Content/infections/Vaccination/Vaccination_node.html

The Standing Committee on Vaccination at the Robert Koch Institute (German: Ständige Impfkommission am Robert-Koch-Institut, German pronunciation: [ˈʃtɛndɪɡə ˈɪmp͡fkɔmɪˌsi̯oːn am ˌʁoːbɛʁt ˈkɔx ɪnstiˌtuːt] ), or STIKO (German pronunciation: [ˈʃtiːko]), is a scientific committee comprising 18 members at the Robert Koch Institute in Berlin, Germany that provides official recommendations for the vaccination schedules used by the individual German states. The committee meets twice yearly to review the latest research regarding vaccination against infectious diseases. Although the STIKO makes recommendations, immunization in Germany is voluntary and there are no official government recommendations. German Federal States typically follow the STIKO's recommendations minimally, although each state can make recommendations for their geographic jurisdiction that extends beyond the recommended list. In addition to the proposed immunization schedule for children and adults, the STIKO recommends vaccinations for occupational groups, police, travelers, and other at risk groups.

== History ==
The STIKO was established in 1972 as a department of the German Federal Health Agency in Berlin. During a reorganization of the Federal Health Agency in 1994, the STIKO was attached to the Robert Koch Institute (RKI) in Berlin which was now an independent Upper-level federal agency under the purview of the Federal Ministry of Health (BMG). RKI compiles data of immunization status upon the entry of children at school, and measures vaccine coverage of Germany at a national level.

The legal basis for the STIKO is §20 of the Infection Protection Act (Infektionsschutzgesetz, or IfSG). Members of the expert body are appointed by the Federal Ministry of Health in coordination with the state ministries of health. Additional expert representatives from the Paul Ehrlich Institute, Robert Koch Institute Federal and state ministries of health attend the meetings in an advisory capacity.

== Responsibility ==
The commission's responsibility is to provide scientifically based recommendations regarding the necessary vaccinations in Germany. Due to the importance of the recommendations, these have been codified in the Infection Protection Act since 2001. In accordance with the goals of the Infection Protection Act, the recommendations are focused on vaccinations that are most relevant to the protection of public health.

The law does not require the commission to perform cost–benefit analysis on individual vaccinations. The commission's recommendations are based on a vaccine's risk–benefit ratio, evaluating the effectiveness of a vaccine versus any risks posed. The commission has developed criteria to minimize vaccine injuries caused by side effects.

German health insurance companies are obligated to cover the cost of any immunizations recommended by the STIKO after they have been reviewed the Federal Joint Committee (G-BA). The G-BA generally adopts the commission's recommendations, although minor differences do exist.

== Membership ==
The members of the STIKO are appointed by the Federal Ministry for Health for 3-year terms. The members serve pro bono publico. Members include experts from many scientific disciplines and public health fields and professionals with extensive experience on vaccination.

For the period of 2024 through 2027, the commission has the following members:

- Chairman: Klaus Überla, Virological Institute of Clinical and Molecular Virology, University Hospital Erlangen
- Deputy Chairwoman: Dr. Marianne Röbl-Mathieu, Gynaecological Practice, Munich
- Dr. Reinhard Berner, Clinic and Polyclinic for Pediatrics and Adolescent Medicine, University Hospital Carl Gustav Carus Dresden
- Prof. Dr. Horst von Bernuth, Section Immunology and Infectious Diseases, Department of Pediatrics, Pulmonology, Immunology and Intensive Care Medicine, Charité University Medicine, Berlin
- Stefan Brockmann, State Health Office of Baden-Württemberg
- Prof. Dr. Alexander Dalpke, Center for Infectious Diseases, Heidelberg University Hospital
- Prof. Dr. Stefan Flasche, Charité Center for Global Health and London School of Hygiene & Tropical Medicine
- Dr. Thomas Grünewald, Clinic for Infectious and Tropical Medicine, Chemnitz Hospital
- Prof. Dr. Andrea Kaifie-Pechmann, Institute and Polyclinic for Occupational, Social and Environmental Medicine, Friedrich-Alexander University Erlangen-Nuremberg
- Dr. Anja Kwetkat, Department of Geriatrics and Palliative Medicine, Osnabrück Hospital
- Dr. Berit Lange, Helmholtz Centre for Infection Research, Braunschweig
- Prof. Dr. Jörg Meerpohl, Cochrane Centre Germany, Freiburg
- Prof. Dr. Beate Müller, Institute of General Medicine, University Medicine Cologne
- Dr. Christian Schönfeld, travel medical advice and vaccinations, Charité University Medicine, Berlin
- Dr. Julia Tabatabai, pediatric group practice, Scheden and Center for Pediatric and Adolescent Medicine/Center for Infectious Diseases/Virology, Heidelberg University Hospital
- Prof. Dr. Constanze Rossmann, Institute of Communication Science and Media Research, LMU Munich
- Prof. Dr. Birgitta Weltermann, Institute of General Practice, University Hospital Bonn
- Dipl.-Med. Gudrun Widders, formerly Health Department Berlin
- Prof. Dr. Ursula Wiedermann-Schmidt, Special Outpatient Clinic for Vaccinations, Travel and Tropical Medicine, Institute for Specific Prophylaxis and Tropical Medicine, Medical University of Vienna

== See also ==
- National Immunization Technical Advisory Group (the global concept)
- Advisory Committee on Immunization Practices (United States)
- Joint Committee on Vaccination and Immunisation (United Kingdom)
- National Advisory Committee on Immunization (Canada)
