= National Immunization Technical Advisory Group =

Advisory committees on vaccination policy

National Immunization Technical Advisory Group (NITAG) is an advisory committee composed of multidisciplinary experts responsible for providing information to national governments. This information is used to make evidence-based decisions regarding vaccines and immunization policies. The majority of industrialized countries, as well as some developing countries, have formally established advisory committees to guide their immunization policies, while other countries are working towards establishing such committees.

== Purpose ==
The primary purpose of a NITAG is to provide technical expertise by offering guidance and recommendations to national policymakers and program managers, enabling them to make evidence-based decisions regarding immunization policies and programs. This may also include recommendations on vaccination schedules, such as the appropriate timing, dosage, and contraindications of vaccines. To ensure that the government gives proper attention to NITAG recommendations, the committee typically reports to high-level officials within the Ministry of Health.

In immunization related policy, Strategic Advisory Group of Experts on Immunization (SAGE) have established mechanisms to synthesize evidence and provide global recommendations. These recommendations are further interpreted at the country level by NITAGs, as they must consider factors such as local disease epidemiology, the acceptability of vaccination strategies to local populations, equity within the population, and programmatic and financial constraints.

In 2011, the World Health Organization (WHO) recommended that each member country establish a NITAG. The Global Vaccine Action Plan (GVAP) called for all 194 member countries to establish, or have access to, a NITAG by 2020.

NITAG are considered to be functional when they meet six defined process indicators agreed upon by the WHO, which are:

1. having a legislative or administrative basis,
2. having formal terms of reference,
3. having at least five areas of expertise represented among its membership,
4. having at least one meeting per year,
5. distribution of the agenda and background documents at least one week prior to meetings, and
6. having mandatory disclosure of conflict of interests.

As of 2024, there are 189 countries reporting existence of NITAG and 154 countries with NITAG with all six WHO functionality criteria. And 85% of the world’s population is served by such NITAGs, 52% increase compared to 2010.

== Members ==
There are no fixed rules regarding the total number of NITAG members, as this depends on local factors such as the need for geographic representation, the country's size, and the availability of resources. However, experience has shown that successful NITAG typically function with around 10 to 15 members. NITAG members usually consist of multidisciplinary experts, representing a broad range of skills and expertise in areas such as clinical medicine (paediatrics and adolescent medicine, adult medicine, geriatrics), epidemiologists, infectious diseases specialists, microbiologists, public health, immunology, vaccinology, immunization programme, health systems and delivery, clinical research and health economics.

== List of NITAG ==
There are no specific guidelines for naming NITAGs, so each country may use different names. For example:

- Australia: Australian Technical Advisory Group on Immunisation (ATAGI)
- Canada: National Advisory Committee on Immunization (NACI)
- France: Technical Commission of Vaccination (Commission Technique des Vaccinations / CTV)
- Germany: Standing Committee on Vaccination (Ständige Impfkommission am Robert-Koch-Institut / STIKO)
- India: National Technical Advisory Group on Immunisation (NTAGI)
- Ireland: National Immunisation Advisory Committee (NIAC)
- United Kingdom: Joint Committee on Vaccination and Immunisation (JCVI)
- United States: Advisory Committee on Immunization Practices (ACIP)
- Pakistan: National Immunization Technical Advisor Group (NITAG)
