= Canadian Journal of Public Health =

Peer-reviewed scientific journal

- Language: English, French
- Edited by: Louise Potvin

Publication details
- History: Public Health Journal (1910–1928) Canadian Public Health Journal (1928–1942) Canadian Journal of Public Health (1942–present)
- Publisher: Canadian Public Health Association (Canada)
- Frequency: Bimonthly
- Open access: Delayed open access
- Impact factor: 2.9 (2023)

Standard abbreviations
- ISO 4: Can. J. Public Health

Indexing
- CODEN: CJPEA4
- ISSN: 0319-2652 (print); 1920-7476 (web)
- OCLC no.: 01553158

Links
- Journal homepage

Canadian Journal of Public Health is a peer-reviewed scientific journal of public health published by the Canadian Public Health Association on a bimonthly basis. It was originally established in 1910 as the Public Health Journal (ISSN 0319-2660), which became Canadian Public Health Journal (ISSN 0319-2652) in 1928, and acquired its current name in 1943. It is edited by Louise Potvin (Université de Montréal). Articles published by the journal become openly accessible 6 months after publication. In 2013, the journal become online only.

In French, the journal is known as Revue Canadienne de Santé Publique (previously Revue Canadienne d'Hygiène Publique).
