= Li Wuwei =

Chinese politician

Li Wuwei (Chinese: 厉无畏; b. November, 1942) is a Chinese male politician and economist, who served as the vice chairperson of the Chinese People's Political Consultative Conference.
