= Li (surname 厲) =

Chinese family name

Li (厲/厉)
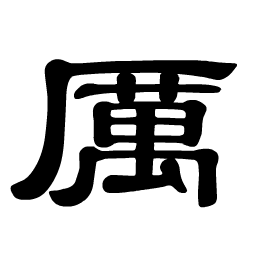
- Pronunciation: Lì (Mandarin); Lai (Cantonese)
- Language: Chinese

Origin
- Language: Old Chinese

Lì is the pinyin romanization of the Chinese surname written 厲 in traditional characters and 厉 in simplified characters. It is also spelled Lai according to the Cantonese pronunciation. It is listed 247th in the Song dynasty classic text Hundred Family Surnames.

Relatively uncommon, Li 厲 is not among the top 300 surnames in China. People with the surname are concentrated in Zhejiang, Jiangsu, Shandong, Henan, and Hunan provinces of China.

According to tradition, the Li 厲 surname originated from Duke Li of Qi of ninth century BC, and the Zhou dynasty state of Li 厲. The oldest extant genealogy book of the Li surname dates from the early fourth century AD.

== Origins ==
According to traditional accounts, there are two ancient origins of the Li 厲 surname:

1. From Duke Li of Qi: Wuji, the ruler of the State of Qi during the Western Zhou dynasty, was killed in a rebellion in 816 BC. After his death, he was given the posthumous title Li, which was adopted by his descendants as their surname. As Duke Li's ancestral name was Jiang (姜), this branch originated from the Jiang surname.

2. From the minor state of Li 厲 during the Zhou dynasty: Li was located at modern Li Township (厉乡) in Sui County, Hubei province. The state was conquered by Chu, a major power of the time. The people of Li adopted the name of their state as their surname.

== Later adoptions ==
As the character 厲/厉, meaning "strict" or "severe", has negative connotations, it was sometimes given to people as a form of punishment.

During the Three Kingdoms period, General Sun Xiù (孙秀), a cousin of Emperor Sun Hao of Eastern Wu, defected to Eastern Wu's enemy Jin. As punishment, Sun Hao forbade Sun Xiu's descendants to use the royal surname and changed their surname to Li.

During the Tang dynasty, Prince Li Jin (李晋), a member of the extended royal family, plotted a rebellion together with Princess Taiping, and was executed after the plot failed. After Emperor Xuanzong ascended the throne, he ordered Li Jin's family members to change their surname from the royal name of Lǐ 李 to Lì 厲.

== Migration and distribution ==
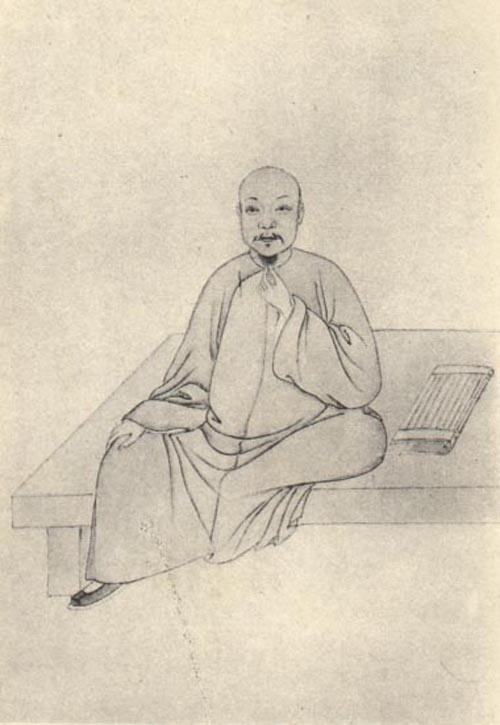
Qing dynasty poet and scholar Li E

The Li surname is concentrated in the provinces of Zhejiang, Jiangsu, Shandong, Henan, and Hunan.

Among the extant genealogy books of the Li surname, the one from the Li clan of Dongyang, Zhejiang is the oldest, dating from the Yongjia era (307–313 AD) of Western Jin. During the Disaster of Yongjia, when northern China was overrun by the Wu Hu nomads, Li Leifu (厉雷甫) fled from Xinye, Henan south to Jinhua, and his descendants subsequently moved to nearby Dongyang. From there they prospered and spread all over Zhejiang province, establishing sublineages in Cixi, Yuyao, Yongkang, Wenzhou, and Zhoushan. The Qing dynasty poet and scholar Li E was a member of the Cixi sublineage.

There are several Li clans in Jiangsu province. The Danyang Li clan is said to have descended from Li Wen (厉温), the Marquis of Yiyang (义阳侯) during the Han dynasty. His descendant Li Jie (厉介) migrated south to Danyang when the Jurchen Jin dynasty overran much of northern China in the 12th century. During the Ming dynasty, Li Guohua (厉国华) from the Danyang Li clan served as the governor of Fujian province.

The Li clan of Liuyang, Hunan province is also said to descend from Li Wen, Marquis of Yiyang. Some of his descendants had moved to Jiangxi province by the Song dynasty. From Jiangxi they then migrated to neighbouring Hunan.

== Notable people ==
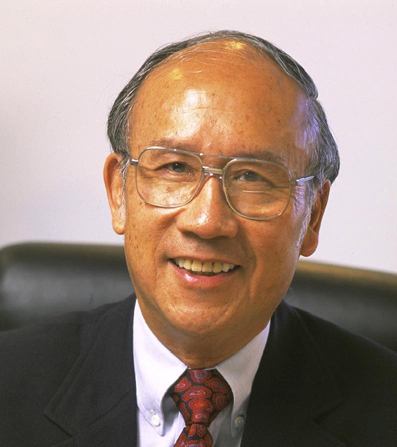
Chinese-American scientist Tingye Li

- Li Wen (厉温), Marquis of Yiyang during the Han dynasty.
- Li Zhongfang (厉仲芳), Song dynasty military leader who invented "Jiu Niu Nu" (九牛弩), a war chariot with crossbows.
- Li E (厲鶚, 1692–1752), Qing dynasty poet, essayist, and scholar.
- Li Zhi (厉志) or Li Yunhuai (厉允怀; 1804–61), Qing dynasty poet, calligrapher, and painter.
- Zee Yee Lee or Li Ruyan (厲汝燕, 1891–1944), aviation pioneer
- Li Yining (厉以宁, 1930–2023), influential reformist economist.
- Tingye Li (厉鼎毅, 1931–2012), Chinese-American scientist.
- Li Youwei (厉有为, born 1938), former Communist Party Chief and Mayor of Shenzhen.
- Li Wuwei (厉无畏, born 1942), Vice-chairman of the Chinese People's Political Consultative Conference, from Dongyang.
