= Strategic Advisory Group of Experts =

Principal advisory group to the World Health Organization

The Strategic Advisory Group of Experts (SAGE) is the principal advisory group to World Health Organization (WHO) for vaccines and immunization. Established in 1999 through the merging of two previous committees, notably the Scientific Advisory Group of Experts (which served the Program for Vaccine Development) and the Global Advisory Group (which served the EPI program) by Director-General of the WHO Gro Harlem Brundtland. It is charged with advising WHO on overall global policies and strategies, ranging from vaccines and biotechnology, research and development, to delivery of immunization and its linkages with other health interventions. SAGE is concerned not just with childhood vaccines and immunization, but all vaccine-preventable diseases. SAGE provide global recommendations on immunization policy and such recommendations will be further translated by advisory committee at the country level.

== Membership ==
The SAGE has 15 members, who are recruited and selected as acknowledged experts from around the world in the fields of epidemiology, public health, vaccinology, paediatrics, internal medicine, infectious diseases, immunology, drug regulation, programme management, immunization delivery, health-care administration, health economics, and vaccine safety. Members are appointed by Director-General of the WHO to serve an initial term of 3 years, and can only be renewed once.

== Working groups ==
SAGE meets at least twice annually in April and November, with working groups established for detailed review of specific topics prior to discussion by the full group. Priorities of work and meeting agendas are developed by the Group in consultation with WHO.

UNICEF, the Secretariat of the GAVI Alliance, and WHO Regional Offices participate as observers in SAGE meetings and deliberations. WHO also invites other observers to SAGE meetings, including representatives from WHO regional technical advisory groups, non-governmental organizations, international professional organizations, technical agencies, donor organizations and associations of manufacturers of vaccines and immunization technologies. Additional experts may be invited, as appropriate, to further contribute to specific agenda items.

As of February 2024, working groups were established for the following vaccines:

- COVID-19
- Dengue
- Ebola
- HPV
- Malaria Policy Advisory Group Working Group on Malaria Vaccines
- Meningococcal vaccines and vaccination
- Pneumococcal vaccines
- Polio vaccine
- Respiratory Syncytial Virus (RSV) Immunization Products
- Smallpox and Monkeypox vaccines

== See also ==
- National Immunization Technical Advisory Group, country-level advisory committee
