= Li (surname 栗) =

Chinese family name

Li (栗)
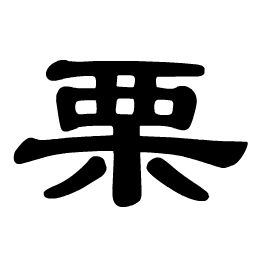
- Pronunciation: Lì (Mandarin); Leut (Cantonese)
- Language: Chinese

Origin
- Language: Old Chinese
- Origin: Lilu, Li state
- Meaning: Chestnut

Lì is the pinyin romanization of the Chinese surname written 栗 in Chinese character. It is also spelled Leut according to the Cantonese pronunciation. Relatively uncommon, it is not listed in the Song dynasty classic Hundred Family Surnames.

Li 栗 is the 249th most common surname in China, with a total population of about 300,000, half of whom live in Henan province.

== Origins ==
According to traditional accounts, the surname Li 栗 originates from the legendary tribe or state called Lilu (栗陆氏), and the historical state of Li, which has been linked to Lilu.

In the third-century text Records of Emperors and Kings (帝王世纪), Huangfu Mi records the legend that goddess Nüwa enfeoffed thirteen tribes or states, all having the Feng (风) surname. Lilu was ranked the fourth among the thirteen. Professor Li Yujie of Henan University believes that Lilu was likely the first people in China to cultivate chestnuts (the character li 栗 also means chestnut).

During the Shang dynasty, the state of Li (栗) existed in what is now Xiayi County, Shangqiu, Henan province. After the state was conquered by the Zhou dynasty, its people adopted the name of their former state as their surname. The surname thus has a history of approximately 3,100 years. The Li capital (called Licheng or Li City), now submerged under the Tianlong Lake southwest of the county seat of Xiayi, is a protected site of Shangqiu.

== Demographics ==
With a total population of approximately 300,000, Li is the 249th most common name in China. Henan province has the highest concentration of people with the surname, accounting for half of the total, followed by Hebei, Shanxi, Anhui, and Shaanxi provinces. 80% of all the people with surname live in two provinces: Henan and Hebei.

== Notable people ==
- Li Fu (栗腹, died 251 BC), Prime Minister of Yan, major state of the Warring States period
- Consort Li, concubine of Emperor Jing of Han, known for her beauty
- Li Yumei (栗毓美) and son Li Yao (栗燿), high-ranking Qing dynasty officials
- Li Youwen (栗又文; 1901–1984), Governor of Jilin Province
- Li Xianting (栗宪庭; born 1949), art critic and curator
- Li Zhanshu (栗战书; born 1950), high-ranking official, member of the Politburo of the Chinese Communist Party
- Li Zhi (栗智; born 1950), former Communist Party Chief of Ürümqi, Xinjiang
- Li Feng (栗峰; died 2003), teacher from Jilin convicted and executed for the rape of his pupils
- Li Xin (栗鑫; born 1989), professional football player
- Li Peng (栗鹏; born 1990), professional football player
