= Lilu (ancient China) =

Lilu (Chinese: 栗陆氏) was a legendary tribe or state of ancient China. According to legends recorded in the third-century text Records of Emperors and Kings (帝王世纪) by Huangfu Mi, goddess Nüwa enfeoffed thirteen tribes or states, all having the Feng (风) surname. Lilu was ranked the fourth among the thirteen. Lilu is also mentioned in many other ancient texts including Zhuangzi, and Dengzi by Deng Xi. Professor Li Yujie of Henan University believes that Lilu was likely the first people in China to cultivate chestnuts (The "li" in Lilu means chestnut). The Li (栗) surname is believed to have originated from the tribe.

Lilu is linked to the Shang dynasty state of Li (栗) in modern Xiayi County, Shangqiu, Henan province. The state was conquered by the Zhou dynasty in the 11th century BC. The Li capital (called Licheng or Li City), now submerged under the Tianlong Lake, is a protected site of Shangqiu.
