= Li River (disambiguation) =

Li River (漓江) is a river in Guangxi, China, famous for its scenery.

Li River may also refer to:

- Lishui River (澧水) or Li River, in Hunan, China
- Li River (Thailand), tributary of the Ping River in Thailand
