= Li (surname 利) =

Chinese surname

Li (利)
- The Chinese character for Li
- Pronunciation: Lì (Mandarin); Lei (Cantonese)
- Language: Tracer dialect

Lì is the pinyin romanization of the Chinese surname written 利 in Chinese character. It is pronounced Lei in Cantonese, and often spelled Lei in Hong Kong and overseas-Chinese communities. It is listed 364th in the Song dynasty classic Hundred Family Surnames. As of 2008, Li is the 299th most common surname in China.

== Origins ==
Traditional texts have recorded several possible origins of the surname Li (利):

1. According to the Song dynasty text Lushi, a collection of historical facts, legends, and folklore, some of the descendants of Laozi (fl. 6th century BC) adopted the surname Li, in honour of their ancestor Lizhen (利贞) who lived during the Shang dynasty.

2. According to the 9th-century Tang dynasty text Yuanhe Xing Zuan, during the Spring and Autumn period, a prince of the Chu state was enfeoffed at the settlement of Li (in present-day Guangyuan, Sichuan province), and his descendants adopted Li as their surname. This branch originates from the royal Chu surname of Mi (芈).

3. Also during the Spring and Autumn period, a minister of Jin state was enfeoffed at another settlement with the same name Li. His descendants used the surname Lisun (利孙), later shortened to Li. This branch originates from the royal Jin surname of Ji (姬).

== Xianbei adoption ==
During the Northern Wei dynasty (386–535), the Xianbei rulers pursued a policy of drastic sinicization, and ordered many non-Chinese people to adopt Chinese surnames. The Book of Wei records that several tribes whose Chinese transliteration contains the character Li 利, such as Chili (叱利), adopted Li as their surname.

== Notable people ==
- Li Ji (利几, third century BC), general under Xiang Yu and later Liu Bang.
- Li Cang (利蒼), Marquis of Dai during the Han dynasty, whose tomb has been discovered at Mawangdui.
- Matteo Ricci (1552–1610), Jesuit priest from Italy, used the Chinese name Li Madou (利瑪竇), adopting Li 利 as his surname.
- Lee Hysan (利希慎, 1879–1928) Hong Kong opium trader and property developer.
- Sir Lee Quo-wei (利國偉, 1918–2013), Hong Kong banker, director of Hang Seng Bank.
- Vivienne Poy née Lee (利德蕙, born 1941), Senator of Canada, granddaughter of Hysan.
- Nina Li or Li Zhi (利智, born 1961), actress, wife of Jet Li (whose surname is a different Li 李).
- Li Guangyu (利光宇, born 1990), Chinese-Australian actor.
