= Li (surname 酈) =

Chinese family name

Li (郦)
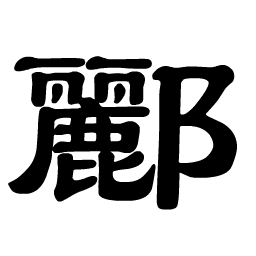
- Pronunciation: Lì (Mandarin); Lik (Cantonese)
- Language: Chinese

Origin
- Language: Old Chinese
- Origin: Li state

Lì is the pinyin romanization of the Chinese surname written 酈 in traditional character and 郦 in simplified character. It is also spelled Lik according to the Cantonese pronunciation. It is listed 303rd in the Song dynasty classic Hundred Family Surnames.

== Origins ==
Li is an ancient surname originating from present-day Henan province. According to traditional accounts recorded in the 9th-century Tang dynasty text Yuanhe Xing Zuan, after Yu the Great founded the Xia dynasty, he enfeoffed Juan, a descendant of the Yellow Emperor, at the settlement of Li (modern Licheng Village 郦城村, Neixiang County, Henan), establishing the Li state. During the middle Spring and Autumn period, Li was conquered by the Jin state, one of the major powers of the period. The noble families of Li subsequently adopted the name of their former state as their surname.

Another origin is the non-Chinese Xirong tribe of Lishan (驪山), who used Lishan as their surname, later shortened to Li.

== Han dynasty ==
During the Chu–Han Contention, the brothers Li Yiji and Li Shang helped Liu Bang defeat Xiang Yu to establish the Han dynasty in 206 BC. Li Yiji was a close advisor to Liu Bang but was executed by Liu's enemies when he tried to persuade them to surrender. Li Shang was a great general who became one of the Prime Ministers of Han. He was enfeoffed at Quzhou and awarded the noble title Marquis of Quzhou (曲周侯). Li Shang is commonly revered as the founding ancestor of the Li surname.

== Later history ==
During the Jin dynasty (266–420), the Li clan of Xincai was famously prosperous.

At the end of the Northern Song dynasty, Li Hong (郦洪) was a general fighting the Jurchen invaders. His son, Li Lun (郦伦), served as the governor of Shaoxing (in modern Zhejiang province), and his family lived in nearby Zhuji. After Li Hong died in battle, Li Lun took two of his sons – Li Deyi (郦德一) and Li De'er (郦德二) – to bring his father's body home. On their way back, Li Hong died in Danyang (in modern Jiangsu province). Deyi and De'er buried the bodies of their father and grandfather, and decided to settle down in Danyang to guard their tombs. The Li descendants in both Zhuji and Danyang became prominent clans. By 1927 the genealogy book of the Danyang Li clan had recorded 27 generations.

== Notable people ==
- Li Yiji (酈食其), influential advisor to Liu Bang, founding emperor of the Han dynasty.
- Li Shang (酈商), general and prime minister of Han, noble title Marquis of Quzhou. Considered the founding ancestor of the Li surname.
- Li Ji (酈寄), son of Li Shang, instrumental in ending the Lü Clan Disturbance of 180 BC.
- Li Yan (郦炎), poet and scholar of the Eastern Han dynasty.
- Li Daoyuan (郦道元), geographer of the Northern Wei dynasty, author of the Commentary on the Water Classic.
- Li Chang (郦昶), Tang dynasty governor of Yangzhou.
- Li Yuanheng (郦元亨), Southern Song dynasty scholar from Zhuji.
- Li Quan (郦权), Jin dynasty (1115–1234) poet.
- Li Guangzu (郦光祖), Ming dynasty scholar.
- Li Zide (郦滋德), Qing dynasty poet.
- Li Chuen-hou (郦俊厚 1919–2011) police chief in Shanghai and later Taiwan, from the Zhuji Li clan.
- Andrew Lih (酈安治), Chinese-American new media researcher.
