= Advisory Committee on Immunization Practices =

Centers for Disease Control committee

Agency overview
- Formed: March 1964
- Jurisdiction: Government of the United States
- Agency executive: Milhoan, Kirk, Chair
- Parent department: Centers for Disease Control and Prevention (CDC)
- Website: www.cdc.gov/acip/

The Advisory Committee on Immunization Practices (ACIP) is a committee within the United States Centers for Disease Control and Prevention (CDC) that provides advice and guidance on effective control of vaccine-preventable diseases in the U.S. civilian population. The ACIP develops written recommendations for routine administration of vaccines to the pediatric and adult populations, along with vaccination schedules regarding appropriate timing, dosage, and contraindications of vaccines. ACIP statements are official federal recommendations for using vaccines and immune globulins in the U.S. and are published by the CDC.

On June 23, 2025, Secretary of Health and Human Services Robert F. Kennedy Jr. fired all 17 ACIP members and—with one exception—appointed members who are either anti-vaccine activists or who lack expertise with vaccines.

ACIP reports directly to the CDC director, although its management and support services are provided by the CDC's National Center for Immunization and Respiratory Diseases.

== Purpose and impact ==
The ACIP was established in March 1964 by the US Surgeon General to assist in preventing and controlling communicable diseases, it recommends licensed new vaccines to be incorporated into the routine immunization schedule, recommends vaccine formulations, and reviews older vaccines to consider revising its recommendations; it is a key committee responsible for shaping U.S. vaccination policy.

As of 2023, with the Inflation Reduction Act changes to Medicare Part D coverage of vaccines, the Affordable Care Act and Medicare insurance coverage of a vaccine ($0 cost sharing) are mandated when the CDC Director adopts the ACIP recommendation for the vaccines as published on the CDC website. Many private insurers follow Centers for Medicare and Medicaid Services precedent.

The ACIP is governed by a charter which has gone through a number of revisions over the years:

- 8 April 2026 charter
- 3 December 2025 Charter
- 1 April 2024 Charter
- 1 April 2012 Charter

== Recommendation process ==
Regularly scheduled ACIP meetings are held three times a year. Notices of each meeting, along with agenda items, are published in the Federal Register under the Federal Advisory Committee Act (FACA) requirements. A vote on vaccine recommendations may be taken when a quorum of at least eight eligible ACIP members is present. Eligible voters are those members who do not have a conflict of interest. If there are not eight eligible voting members present, the ACIP executive secretary can temporarily designate ex officio members as voting members, as provided in the committee charter. Meetings are advertised and open to the public and are now available online via webcast. The minutes of each meeting are available on the CDC website within 90 days of the conference.

In October 2010, ACIP adopted the GRADE (Grading of Recommendations Assessment, Development and Evaluation) framework. Their process includes a review of labeling and package inserts; a review of the scientific literature on the safety and efficacy; an assessment of cost-effectiveness; a review of the morbidity and mortality associated with the disease; a review of the recommendations of other groups; and a consideration of the feasibility of vaccine use in existing programs. Each piece of evidence is judged as very low, low, moderate, or high quality. Problems such as lack of reliability and biases are taken into account, and the quality of the evidence is adjusted accordingly. Vaccines suitable for nearly all persons in an age- or risk-factor-based group are assigned Category A. Category B recommendations are made for individual clinical decision-making between the patient and physician. Both Category A and Category B vaccines must be covered by insurance companies (following the ACA).

At meetings, the ACIP may vote to include new vaccines in the VFC program or to modify existing vaccine schedules. These votes are codified as VFC resolutions. In most cases, a resolution takes effect after establishing a CDC contract for purchasing that vaccine in the necessary amounts.

Recommendations are then forwarded to the CDC Director for approval. Once approved, the recommendations appear in the CDC's Morbidity and Mortality Weekly Report and represent the official CDC recommendations for immunizations in the US.

=== Working groups ===
To ensure a thorough review of available information, ACIP often appoints working groups to assist in drafting its recommendations, composed of ACIP members, CDC staff, and others with immunization expertise. Workgroups work year-round to catalog specific vaccines and safety information. They review all available scientific information about vaccines which will be discussed at the next ACIP meeting so that they can present the relevant information after the vaccine is licensed at the meeting. Work groups do not vote on the final recommendation.

== Members ==
The ACIP nominally contains fifteen regular members, each an expert in one of the following fields:

- immunization practices and public health
- use of vaccines and other immunobiologic agents in clinical practice or preventive medicine
- clinical or laboratory vaccine research
- assessment of vaccine efficacy and safety
- consumer perspectives and/or social and community aspects of immunization programs; at least one member must be an expert in this category.

No one currently employed by or involved with any employees of vaccine manufacturing companies or who holds a patent for a vaccine can be a member of ACIP. In addition, the ACIP includes ex officio members from Federal agencies involved with vaccine issues, and non-voting liaison representatives from medical and professional societies and organizations.

=== 2025 ===
Before leaving office in January 2025, the Biden administration's Secretary of Health and Human Services Xavier Becerra approved the appointment of eight new members. The decision to fill four newly created positions and replace four members whose terms were to end in June was described as being "motivated by a desire to try to insulate the scientific integrity of the panel from the incoming administration". The newly appointed members were seen as strong immunization supporters.

President Donald Trump's Secretary of Health and Human Services Robert F. Kennedy Jr. was appointed on February 13, 2025. He is a prominent voice in the anti-vaccine movement, spreading anti-vaccine misinformation, disinformation, and propaganda.

On June 23, 2025, Kennedy removed all 17 members of the ACIP and replaced them with only 8 new members. The Wall Street Journal published an editorial asserting that Kennedy's statement concerning the mass dismissals reveals a deliberate effort to stymie vaccine development: "His goal is to eliminate incentives to develop vaccines". This action was identified by experts as Kennedy continuing a pattern of degrading public health protections in the United States-based solely upon personal and political biases, disregarding clear evidence and scientific data. Paul Offit described two of the appointees (Malone and Pebsworth) as anti-vaccine activists. One of the new appointees, Michael A. Ross, withdrew prior to the first meeting. On September 15, 2025, Kennedy Jr. announced 5 additional appointees to the board.

Members appointed by Robert F. Kennedy Jr., June 2025
Portrait	Name	Position and expertise
	Hillary Blackburn	Pharmacist and daughter-in-law of Marsha Blackburn
	Evelyn Griffin	Obstetrician and gynecologist who claims to have lost her job for refusing to get a COVID-19 vaccine
	Joseph Hibbeln	Psychiatrist and nutritional scientist without "discernible expertise" in immunology or vaccines.
	Martin Kulldorff	A Swedish biostatistician who developed tools for CDC's Vaccine Safety Datalink project, he advocated for COVID-19 herd immunity rather than using vaccines. Former Harvard professor, fired for refusing the COVID-19 vaccine. Initiator of the Great Barrington declaration.
	Retsef Levi	An applied mathematician and professor of operations management at Massachusetts Institute of Technology
	Robert W. Malone	Physician and researcher who was involved in early studies that were steps towards mRNA vaccine development. Although mRNA vaccines were developed through the work of many researchers, he claims to be the inventor of mRNA vaccines.
	H. Cody Meissner	Physician with expertise in pediatric infectious diseases and childhood vaccinations, professor of pediatrics at Geisel School of Medicine at Dartmouth; ACIP member from 2008 to 2012 Co-signatory of the Great Barrington Declaration.
	Kirk Milhoan	Pediatric cardiologist and senior fellow at the Independent Medical Alliance
	James Vincent Pagano	Retired ED physician without "discernible expertise" in immunology or vaccines.
	Vicky Pebsworth	Board member of the anti-vaccine group National Vaccine Information Center, nurse, Ph.D. in public health, prior Vaccines and Related Biological Products Advisory Committee member
	Raymond Pollak	Semi-retired transplant surgeon
	Catherine Stein	Epidemiologist at Case Western Reserve University

== Selected recommendations ==
=== Until 2024 ===
On February 26, 2015, ACIP voted to deliver a Category A recommendation for administering MenB vaccines to persons older than 10 years who were at higher risk of meningococcal disease.

On June 24, 2015, ACIP heard the arguments for recommending Pfizer and Novartis's serogroup B meningococcal vaccines for everyone in the 16-22 age group. The vaccines were licensed to be administered to persons 10 to 25 years of age. ACIP was unable to grade all of the evidence according to the GRADE system, but they considered the evidence given to be of enough quality to consider a recommendation. The proposed wording was as follows:

"A serogroup B meningococcal (MenB) vaccine series may be administered to adolescents and young adults 16 through 23 years of age to provide short-term protection against most strains of serogroup B meningococcal disease. The preferred age for MenB vaccination is 16 through 18 years of age. (Category B)"

The motion was passed, 14 to 1.

In 2020, ACIP created a phased vaccine allocation recommendation for the COVID vaccines.

In the 2024 case of Braidwood v. Becerra, the United States Court of Appeals for the Fifth Circuit entertained questions about the constitutionality of ACIP recommendations having certain binding legal effects, pursuant to the Presentment Clause of the Constitution of the United States, since members of the body are not appointed by the president to be confirmed by the Senate. Although the court did not decide that using such ACIP recommendations was unconstitutional, it held that another board that similarly made recommendations with binding legal effects was unconstitutional and remanded the question of the constitutionality of ACIP's role to the district court.

=== Under RFK, Jr. ===
On June 23, 2025, Secretary of Health and Human Services Robert F. Kennedy Jr. fired all 17 ACIP members and—with one exception—appointed members who are either anti-vaccine activists or who lack expertise in vaccines.

At the first meeting of the newly constituted group on June 26, 2025, ACIP voted in favor of recommending that most Americans receive influenza vaccines that do not contain thiomersal, a preservative. HHS Secretary Kennedy adopted ACIP's recommendation on July 22, 2025, formally incorporating the removal of thiomersal from influenza vaccines into federal public health policy.

Unusually, a presentation of the scientific information developed by the CDC's staff was not made; instead a presentation was made by Lyn Redwood, (formerly of Kennedy's anti-vaccine group Children's Health Defense) who said that thiomersal is a neurotoxin. The presentation was a variation of one Redwood posted to the CDCs site earlier, which referred to a study which did not exist. This slide was removed in the committee presentation.

In September 2025, ACIP voted to end its recommendation for the MMRV vaccine for children under age 4.

On December 5, 2025, the group voted 8–3 to end the universal recommendation that every infant receive a Hepatitis B vaccine at birth, instead advising individualized recommendations be made based on the mother's Hepatitis B infection status.

The change of the long-standing recommendation for the Hepatitis B vaccine at birth was criticized. One of the critics was ACIP member Cody Meissner: "I will just say: we have heard that do no harm is a moral imperative. We are doing harm by changing this wording. And I vote no."

Scientific American wrote:

About 18,000 infants and children were infected with hepatitis B annually before the vaccine was recommended to all newborns in the U.S., according to the Children's Hospital of Philadelphia. "... And the regimen has been effective: cases from 1990 to 2019 dropped by 99 percent."

The changes to the vaccine schedule were criticized by many mainstream medical organizations including the American Academy of Pediatrics, the American Medical Association, the National Foundation for Infectious Diseases, and the Infectious Diseases Society of America.

On January 26, 2026, Dr. Kirk Milhoan, the director of ACIP, said in an interview that polio and MMR vaccines should not be mandated.

== Allegations of conflicts of interest in vaccine advisory committees ==
On June 23, 2025, Health Secretary Robert F. Kennedy Jr. dismissed all 17 members of ACIP, arguing in an op-ed for The Wall Street Journal that the committee was compromised by financial conflicts of interest. He cited a 2009 inspector general's report which he said showed that 97% of members had conflicts.

Experts and fact-checkers disputed this characterization. Former CDC Director Tom Frieden, who received the 2009 report while in office, explained that the 97% figure referred to incomplete paperwork—such as missing signatures—rather than actual financial ties. According to Frieden, "16 of those 17 people reported no conflicts of interest. One reported a conflict of interest … and so she recused herself."

Further evidence came from a peer-reviewed study published in JAMA in August 2025, which found that conflicts of interest among ACIP members had declined sharply over the previous two decades and had been at historic lows when Kennedy dismissed the committee. The study reported that the share of members with financial conflicts dropped from 42.8% in 2000 to 5% by 2024. Since 2016, the average conflict rates were 6.2% for ACIP and 1.9% for the FDA's Vaccines and Related Biological Products Advisory Committee (VRBPAC). Almost all interests involved research funding, and less than 1% involved personal compensation like consulting fees from vaccine manufacturers.

In a statement to NBC News in response to the JAMA article findings, the Department of Health and Human Services did not address the apparent contradiction directly, stating only that "Secretary Kennedy is committed to eliminating both real and perceived conflicts to strengthen confidence in public health decisions".

During a hearing before the Senate Finance Committee on September 4, 2025, Secretary Kennedy admitted that several of the members he appointed to replace the ACIP members had previously served as paid expert witnesses in litigation against vaccine manufacturers.

=== American Academy of Pediatrics v. Kennedy ===
American Academy of Pediatrics v. Kennedy
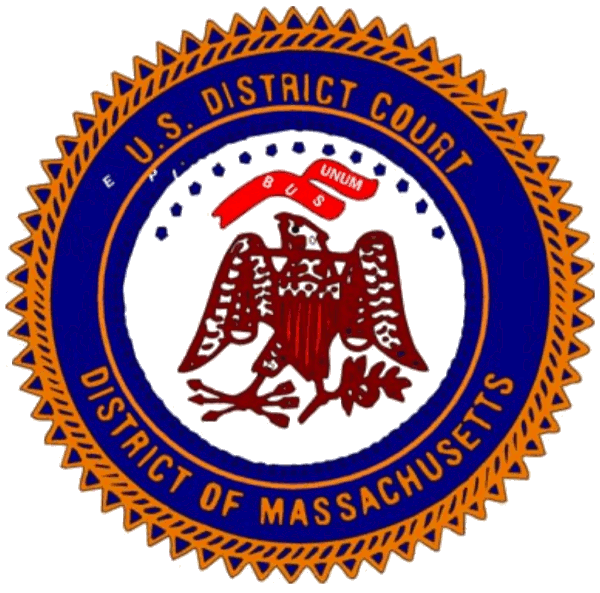
- Court: District of Massachusetts
- Started: July 7, 2025
- Docket nos.: 1:25-cv-11916

Court membership
- Judge sitting: Brian E. Murphy

In July 2025, the American Academy of Pediatrics and other medical organizations filed suit in the United States District Court for the District of Massachusetts, challenging Kennedy's dismissal and replacement of sitting members of ACIP, arguing that this undermined the scientific integrity of ACIP and violated federal law governing advisory committees, particularly the Federal Advisory Committee Act. On January 6, 2026, Judge Brian E. Murphy denied the government's motion to dismiss, holding that plaintiffs had legal standing to pursue their FACA-based challenge to the ACIP reconstitution.

On March 16, 2026, Judge Murphy issued a preliminary injunction stating because the new appointments likely violated federal law, their membership will be invalidated and all votes by the new committee would be stayed.

== State alternatives ==
Lack of trust in future changes to vaccine recommendations after the 2025 purge spurred the creation of two interstate collaborations, the West Coast Health Alliance and Northeast Public Health Collaborative.

== See also ==
- Joint Committee on Vaccination and Immunisation, the National Health Service counterpart in the United Kingdom
- National Advisory Committee on Immunization, immunization advisory committee in Canada
- National Immunization Technical Advisory Group, generic terms for immunization advisory committee
- Standing Committee on Vaccination, immunization advisory committee in Germany
- Vaccination policy of the United States, including schedules
