= Li Feng (rapist) =

Li Feng 栗峰
- Born: c. 1977
- Died: July 29, 2003 (aged 25/26); Jilin province, China
- Cause of death: Execution by shooting
- Occupation: School teacher
- Known for: Sexually assaulting 19 girls

Li Feng (Chinese: 栗峰; pinyin: Lì Fēng; c. 1977–July 29, 2003) was a Chinese teacher who was executed for sexually molesting and raping 19 girls.

Li was an elementary school teacher in the city of Tonghua, in northeast China's Jilin province. He began teaching in 1998, and he began molesting his students in August of that year. He assaulted various girls in his class for the next four years. The victims were all under the age of 14.

In August 2002, Li changed classes and tried to molest his new students. However, the girls in his new class rejected his advances. Three parents then complained about Li Feng's behavior to the school's principal; the principal told the parent to take the complaint to the city's education board and ask for Li Feng to be transferred to another school, and that the school had "no authority" to fire Li Feng. On September 2, 2002, the city's department of education suspended Li Feng from teaching, but added the stipulation that he would be put on "observation" for another year. Thereafter, Li Feng was transferred to work at the department of education.

Li Feng's father, Li Fuchen (栗福臣), a local village chief and legislator, attempted to settle with the parents of the three children who filed complaints with the principal by giving each family 7,000 yuan (~$950), roughly equivalent at the time to an annual salary of a migrant labourer. Although initially the families seem to have been appeased by Li Fuchen's gestures, word of the case quickly spread in the city. Upon hearing word that Li Feng's father had paid off the three parents who complained to the school, the parents of the other victims decided to report Li Feng directly to the police.

Li Feng, with the help of his father, attempted to escape the city to avoid arrest. He was officially fired from his job and the city revoked his teaching license. He was arrested by authorities on September 8, 2002. The case garnered significant notoriety and earned the attention of top Jilin provincial government officials, including Party Secretary Wang Yunkun and Deputy Party Secretary Quan Zezhu, and highlighted the failure of the city's education bureaucrats and the school board itself in addressing the case appropriately. The case was also notable for the silence of the victims and the failure of parents to detect the abuse of their children despite protestations by the pupils themselves. The principal of the school Li Feng worked at was fired after the investigation. It was later discovered that Li Feng had raped nine students in total and molested ten others. On March 14, 2003, Li was sentenced to death by the Higher People's Court of Jilin province and executed in July of the same year.

Li's father, who tried to help his son avoid arrest, was convicted of aiding and abetting in a crime and hiding a criminal, and sentenced to two years in prison.
