= Public Health Ontario =

Public Health agency

- French: Agence ontarienne de protection et de promotion de la santé

Agency overview
- Formed: July 2008
- Preceding agency: Ontario Public Health Laboratories
- Type: Crown agency
- Jurisdiction: Government of Ontario
- Headquarters: 661 University Avenue Suite 1701 Toronto, Ontario M5G 1M1; 43°39′18″N 79°23′20″W
- Motto: Partners for Health
- Minister responsible: Sylvia Jones, Minister of Health
- Agency executives: Michael Sherar, President; Helen Angus, Chair
- Key document: Ontario Agency for Health Protection and Promotion Act, 2007
- Website: publichealthontario.ca

The Public Health Ontario, (French: Santé Publique Ontario), incorporated under the name Ontario Agency for Health Protection and Promotion (French: Agence Ontarienne De Protection Et De Promotion De La Santé) is the Ontario Government agency responsible for providing scientific and technical advice to those working to promote and protect the health of people in Ontario, Canada.

== History and organization ==
The Ontario Agency for Health Protection and Promotion was established in 2008 by the Ontario Agency for Health Protection and Promotion Act, 2007. The OAHPP is an agent of the Crown (i.e. a Crown agency) and is considered an arm's-length government agency. It has a mandate to provide scientific and technical advice to those working to protect and promote the health of Ontario residents. Its objectives include establishing, operating and maintaining laboratory centres, providing laboratory services, and operating Ontario public health laboratories previously operated by the Ministry of Health and Long-Term Care.

As of December 15, 2008, the Ministry of Health and Long-Term Care announced that all employees, programs and functions of the Ontario Public Health Laboratories (OPHL) had been transferred to the OAHPP. In early June 2011, the OAHPP announced that it would operate under the name Public Health Ontario beginning on June 11, 2011.

== See also ==
- Chief Medical Officer of Health (As of June 2021 Kieran Moore)
