= Vaccine adverse event =

- Other names: Vaccine injury
- Specialty: Emergency medicine

A vaccine adverse event (VAE), sometimes referred to as a vaccine injury, is an adverse event believed to have been caused by vaccination. The World Health Organization (WHO) refers to Adverse Events Following Immunization (AEFI).

AEFIs can be related to the vaccine itself (product or quality defects), to the vaccination process (administration error or stress related reactions) or can occur independently from vaccination (coincidental).

Most vaccine adverse events are mild. Serious injuries and deaths caused by vaccines are very rare, and the idea that severe events are common has been classed as a "common misconception about immunization" by the WHO. Some claimed vaccine injuries are not, in fact, caused by vaccines; for example, there is a subculture of advocates who attribute their children's autism to vaccine injury, despite the fact that vaccines do not cause autism.

Claims of vaccine injuries appeared in litigation in the United States in the latter part of the 20th century. Some families have won substantial awards from sympathetic juries, even though many public health officials have said that the claims of injuries are unfounded. In response, several vaccine makers stopped production, threatening public health, resulting in laws being passed at several points to shield makers from liabilities stemming from vaccine injury claims.

== Adverse events ==
According to the U.S. Centers for Disease Control and Prevention, while "any vaccine can cause side effects", most side effects are minor, primarily including sore arms or a mild fever. Unlike most medical interventions vaccines are given to healthy people, where the risk of side effects is not as easily outweighed by the benefit of treating existing disease. As such, the safety of immunization interventions is taken very seriously by the scientific community, with constant monitoring of a number of data sources looking for patterns of adverse events.

As the success of immunization programs increases and the incidence of disease decreases, public attention shifts away from the risks of disease to the risk of vaccination. Concerns about immunization safety often follow a pattern. First, some investigators suggest that a medical condition of increasing prevalence or unknown cause is due to an adverse effect of vaccination. The initial study, and subsequent studies by the same investigators, have inadequate methodology, typically a poorly controlled or uncontrolled case series. A premature announcement is made of the alleged adverse effect, which resonates with individuals who have the condition and which underestimates the potential harm of not being vaccinated. The initial study is not reproduced by other investigators. Finally, it takes several years before the public regains confidence in the vaccine.

Controversies in this area revolve around the question of whether the risks of adverse events following immunization outweigh the benefits of preventing infectious disease. In rare cases immunizations can cause serious adverse effects, such as gelatin measles-mumps-rubella vaccine (MMR) causing anaphylaxis, a severe allergic reaction. Allegations particularly focus on disorders claimed to be caused by the MMR vaccine and thiomersal, a preservative used in vaccines routinely given to U.S. infants prior to 2001. Current scientific evidence does not support claims of vaccines causing various disorders.

The debate is complicated by misconceptions around the recording and reporting of adverse events by anti-vaccination activists. According to authorities, anti-vaccination websites greatly exaggerate the risk of serious adverse effects from vaccines and falsely describe conditions such as autism and shaken baby syndrome as vaccine injuries, leading to misconceptions about the safety and effectiveness of vaccines. This has had the result of stigmatizing autistic people and the parents who had them immunized.

Many countries, including Canada, Germany, Japan, and the United States have specific requirements for reporting vaccine-related adverse effects, while other countries including Australia, France, and the United Kingdom include vaccines under their general requirements for reporting injuries associated with medical treatments. A number of countries have programs for the compensation of injuries alleged to have been caused by a vaccination.

=== Febrile seizures ===
Febrile seizures may occur after the administration of certain vaccines, including the MMR vaccine, and influenza vaccines. According to the Centers for Disease Control and Prevention, febrile seizures do not cause any harm or have any permanent effects.

=== Allergic reactions ===
It is thought that certain vaccines can, very rarely, cause anaphylaxis in yeast-sensitive individuals and children allergic to vaccine ingredients. The rate of anaphylaxis is estimated to be around one per million vaccine doses.

== United States ==
=== Vaccine Injury Compensation Program ===
In 1988, the National Vaccine Injury Compensation Program (VICP) went into effect to compensate individuals and families of individuals who have been injured by specified childhood vaccines. The VICP was adopted in response to an earlier scare over the pertussis portion of the DPT vaccine. These claims were later generally discredited, but some U.S. lawsuits against vaccine makers won substantial awards; most makers ceased production, and the last remaining major manufacturer threatened to do so. As of October 2019, $4.2 billion in compensation (not including attorneys fees and costs) has been awarded.

VICP uses a streamlined system for litigating vaccine injury claims under which the claimant must show that the vaccine caused the injury, but just as in litigation for injury by any other product, they are not required to establish it was anyone's fault (i.e. negligence need not be proven) Claims that are denied can be pursued through civil lawsuits, though this is rare, and the statute creating the VICP also imposes substantial limitations on the ability to pursue such lawsuits. The VICP covers all vaccines listed on the Vaccine Injury Table which is maintained by the Secretary of Health and Human Services. To win an award, a claimant is required to show a causal connection between an injury and one of the vaccines listed in the Vaccine Injury Table. Compensation is payable for "table" injuries, those listed in the Vaccine Injury Table, as well as, "non-table" injuries, injuries not listed in the table.

In addition, an award may only be given if the claimant's injury lasted for more than 6 months after the vaccine was given, resulted in a hospital stay and surgery or resulted in death. Awards are based on medical expenses, lost earnings and pain and suffering (capped at $250,000).

From 1988 until March 3, 2011, 5,636 claims relating to autism, and 8,119 non-autism claims, were made to the VICP. 2,620 of these claims, one autism-related, were compensated, with 4,463 non-autism and 814 autism claims dismissed; awards (including attorney's fees) totaled over $2 billion. The VICP also applies to claims for injuries sustained before 1988; there were 4,264 of these claims of which 1,189 were compensated with awards totaling $903 million. As of October 2019, $4.2 billion in compensation (not including attorneys fees and costs) has been awarded over the life of the program.

By lowering the legal and financial risks, the study of the Vaccine Injury Compensation Program show that it has helped stabilize the U.S. vaccine industry. It lowered lawsuit costs and continued vaccine supply by moving injury claims from civil to federal systems. According to the economic assessments, the VICP balances people's safeguards with public health goals. They did this by increasing the speed of claim processing while keeping payments for the people who have been legitimately hurt. The long term success of national immunization programs and the avoidance of vaccine shortages have been linked to this model.

As part of NVICP, a table has been created which lists various vaccines, side effects that might plausibly be caused by them, and the time within which the symptoms must present in order to be eligible to apply for compensation. For example, for vaccines containing tetanus toxoid (e.g., DTaP, DTP, DT, Td, or TT), anaphylaxis within four hours or brachial neuritis between two and twenty-eight days after administration, may be compensated.

=== Countermeasures Injury Compensation Program ===
Established by PREP Act, in the case of pandemic, epidemic, or other major security threat requiring a medical countermeasures, such as vaccines and medications, the CICP provides compensation to eligible individuals for serious physical injuries or death. Covid-19 vaccines are covered under the program.

=== Vaccine Adverse Event Reporting System ===
The Vaccine Adverse Event Reporting System (VAERS) is a passive surveillance program administered jointly by the Food and Drug Administration (FDA) and the Centers for Disease Control and Prevention (CDC).

VAERS is intended to track adverse events associated with vaccines. VAERS collects and analyzes information from reports of adverse events that occur after the administration of US licensed vaccines. VAERS has several limitations, including underreporting, unverified reports, inconsistent data quality, and inadequate data about the number of people vaccinated. Due to the program's open and accessible design and its allowance of unverified reports, incomplete VAERS data is often used in false claims regarding vaccine safety.

=== Vaccine Safety Datalink ===
The Vaccine Safety Datalink (VSD), funded by the Centers for Disease Control, is composed of databases from several organizations containing information regarding health outcomes for millions of US citizens and to enhance assessment of vaccine injuries. It was designed to allow for such things as comparisons between vaccinated and non-vaccinated populations, and for the identification of possible groups at risk for adverse events.

== United Kingdom ==
The Vaccine Damage Payment Act 1979 governs AEFIs in the UK, and sets up the Vaccine Damage Payment Scheme (VDPS).

=== Vaccine Damage Payment Scheme ===
Under the VDPS, it is thought that thousands of unsuccessful claims have been made. The maximum payment per claim is currently £120,000. The 'disability threshold' before payments are granted is 60%. The scheme covers vaccinations for illnesses such as tetanus, measles, tuberculosis, and meningitis C. As of 2005, the British government had paid out £3.5 million to vaccine injury patients since 1997.

Until the advent of COVID-19, disabled vaccine injury patients were allowed to file a claim up to the age of 21. On the 2 December 2020, government agreed under regulation secondary to the 1979 Act the statutory £120,000 blanket payout for any person provably damaged by the vaccine, and by the same addition of COVID-19 to the list, government-approved Covax manufacturers were exempted from legal pursuit. Individuals who provide the vaccine (and thus are permitted by government to do so) are also protected.

== Canada ==
Quebec has a legal process to compensate certain forms of vaccination injuries; the program was set up by statute in 1985, and its first awards were made in 1988.

On 10 December 2020, the nations was made aware via an op-ed published in the Globe and Mail that "Canada needs to prepare for rare but serious health problems resulting from [Covid-19] vaccination" by, inter alia, the Honourable Dr Jane Philpott, former cabinet member and Dean of the Faculty of Health Sciences of Queen's University. The authors observed that, outside of Quebec, "People suffering severe AEFIs are left to assume the costs of legal fees, lost wages, uninsured medical services and rehabilitation supports", and plumped for a no-fault system, in which "compensation is needs-based and not punitive." They go on to write:

In the context of the COVID-19 pandemic, we are concerned that, given the anticipated scale of the COVID-19 immunization campaign and new vaccine technologies employed, mass immunization may result in a small number of Canadians experiencing serious AEFIs, despite adherence to best practices. While AEFIs are possible with routine immunizations, pandemic situations are unique with respect to the speed and scale with which vaccine technologies are developed and distributed. Rare serious AEFIs may not be captured during phases of clinical trials because it may require very large numbers of the population to be immunized for AEFIs to manifest. The anticipated incidence of serious AEFIs can be estimated at 1 in one million immunizations... the potential health consequences of adverse events following immunization borne by the few will be for our collective benefit in stopping the deadly spread of the virus. Operating under this estimate, we anticipate 25 Canadians may suffer a serious health outcome following COVID-19 vaccination, or 0.1 per 100,000 doses.

The authors conclude that an "equitable and fair compensation system with a transparent accountability process for monitoring potential AEFIs associated with COVID-19 immunization could increase public confidence in vaccines and promote uptake."

== Germany ==
Germany has established a treatment and research centre for VAEs at Marburg University Hospital (UKGM).

== See also ==
- Bundaberg tragedy
- Vaccine hesitancy
- COVID-19 vaccine#Adverse events
