= List of duels =

List of notable one-on-one engagements

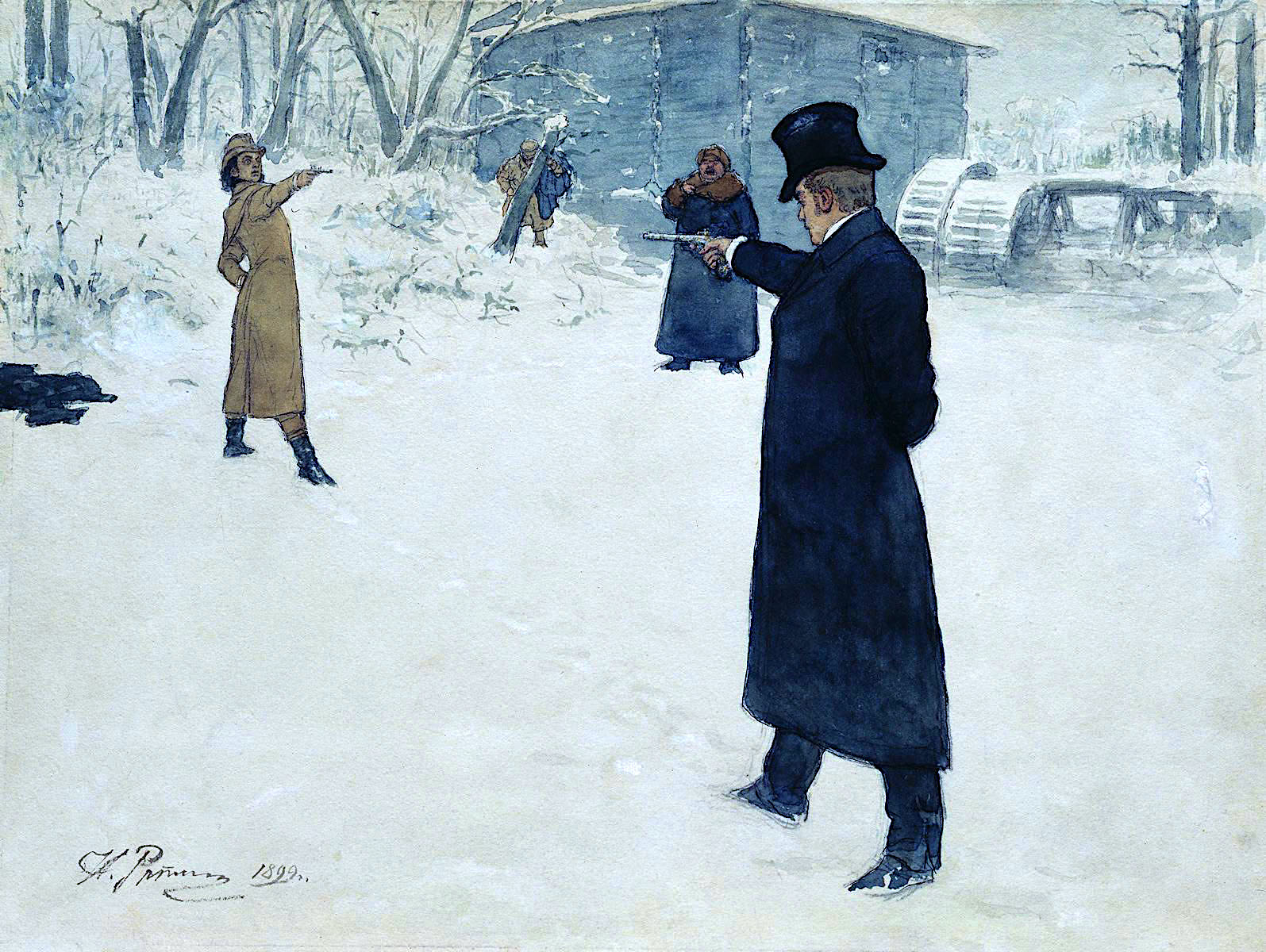
Ilya Repin's picture of the duel from Eugene Onegin

The following is a list of notable one-to-one duels or single combats in history and in legend or fiction.

== Antiquity ==
- 7th century BC: The Horatii defeated the Curatii of Alba Longa.
- 5th century BC: Aulus Cornelius Cossus, one of only three Roman generals ever awarded the spolia opima, killed the King of the Veientes, Lars Tolumnius, in single combat.
- 4th century BC: Dioxippus vs. Coragus.
- 361 BC: Titus Manlius Torquatus slew a Gaul of enormous size in single combat and stripped a Torc off the corpse.
- 222 BC: Marcus Claudius Marcellus took the spolia opima from Viridomarus, King of the Gaesatae, at the Battle of Clastidium.
- 29 BC: Marcus Licinius Crassus vs. Deldo, King of the Bastarnae.

== Middle Ages ==
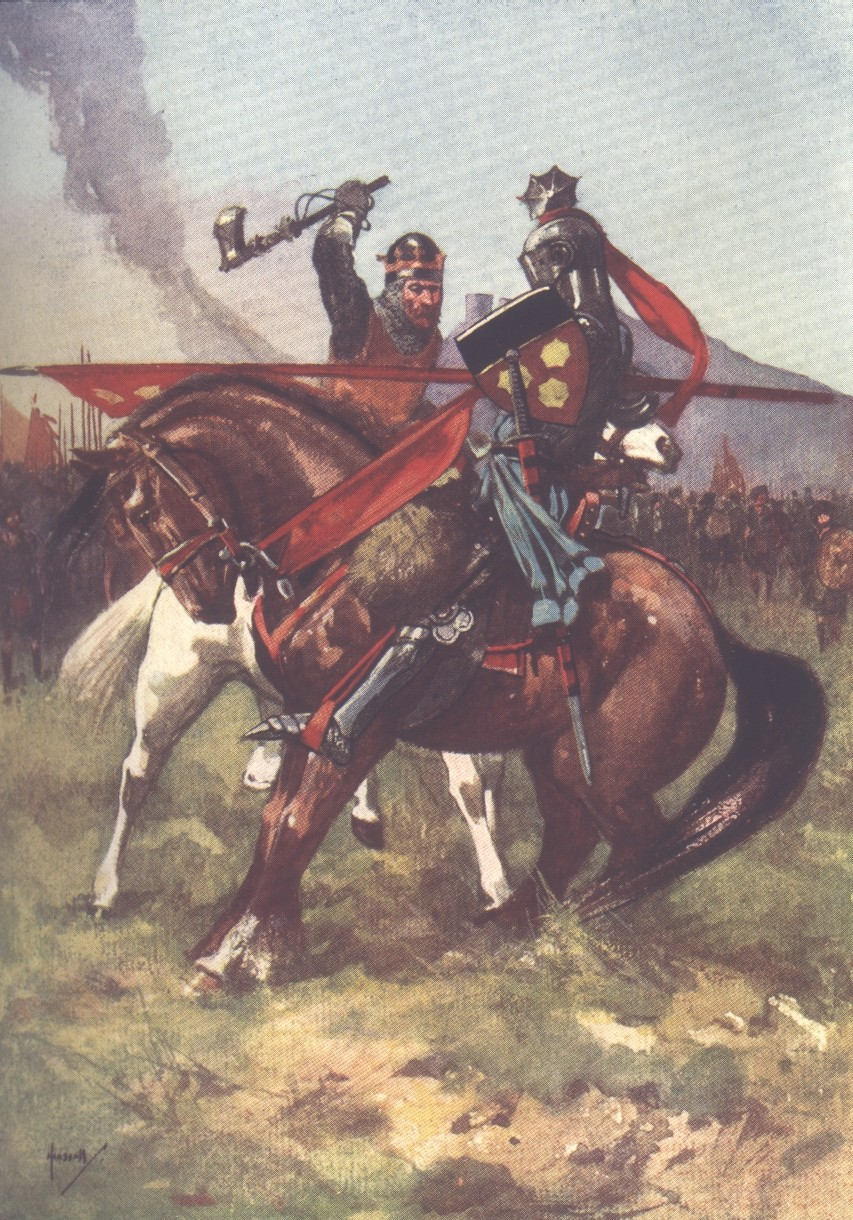
Robert the Bruce killing Henry de Bohun in single combat during a battle

- March 13, 624: Ali, Hamza ibn Abdul-Muttalib and Ubaydah ibn al-Harith killed Walid bin Utbah, Utbah ibn Rabi'ah and Shaybah ibn Rabi'ah in the Battle of Badr.
- 627: Ali killed Amr ibn Abd al-Wud in the Battle of Khandaq.
- Khalid ibn al-Walid during his military career fought several duels and was victorious in each one of them.
- 636: Abu Ubaidah ibn al-Jarrah killed Gregory, a Greek general in the Battle of Yarmouk on the 6th and final day of the battle.
- 1014: Gunnlaugr Ormstunga and Hrafn Önundarson fought the last recorded Holmgang (Viking duel) in Iceland that ended in a draw.
- 1022: Tmutarakan Prince Mstislav the Brave and Kasogs Prince Rededya.
- April 11, 1127: Galbert of Bruges recorded an event near Ypres where Herman the Iron challenged Guy Steenvorde, alleging his complicity in the assassination of Charles the Good, Count of Flanders. In the ensuing duel, Steenvorde was brutally defeated and, though dying, hanged for having been found guilty in a trial by combat.
- During the Easter of 1163 at the king's court the feudal baron of Rayleigh Henry of Essex (also a royal constable) was accused of treason by the nobleman Robert de Montfort. The two fought a judicial duel on Fry's Island which Henry lost and was carried off the scene by monks from Reading abbey. Having been proven guilty his estates were forfeit and he had to become a monk.
- June 23, 1314: During the first day of the Battle of Bannockburn, Robert the Bruce and his rival Henry de Bohun engaged in an isolated combat which ended with Bruce killing Bohun.
- September 8, 1380: Alexander Peresvet and Tatar champion Chelubey.
- December 29, 1386: Knights Jean de Carrouges and Jacques Le Gris fought a judicial duel in Paris, France. It began when Carrouges accused Le Gris of raping his wife Marguerite, and when the case could not be solved in court, the King of France Charles VI intervened and suggested that the two end the dispute in a duel to the death. During the melee that followed, in which both combatants fought each other in plate armor together with an assortment of weapons, Carrouges managed to wrestle the larger Le Gris to the ground, remove his head cover, and kill him, thus "proving" his charges. The duel was chronicled in a 2004 book by Eric Jager and the 2021 film The Last Duel, directed by Ridley Scott.

== Early modern and modern duels ==
=== Asia ===
- 1593: Siamese King Naresuan slew Burmese Crown Prince Mingyi Swa in an elephant duel.
- April 14, 1612: Famous Japanese swordsman Miyamoto Musashi dueled his rival Sasaki Kojirō on the island of Funajima. Musashi arrived late and unkempt to the appointed place. Musashi killed Sasaki with a bokken or wooden sword. He fashioned the bokken out of a boat oar on his way to the island. Sasaki's weapon of choice was the nodachi, a long sword. In addition, on a pilgrimage, Musashi fought sixty duels, and not once was he defeated.
- 1906: In Istanbul, during the reign of the Ottoman Sultan Abdulhamid II, a duel between a young Kurdish aristocrat named Abdulrazzak Bedirkhan and the chief of police of the city Ridvan Pasha occurred. The police chief was killed and subsequently the entire Bedirkhan family was exiled.
- April 14, 1920: A very well-recorded bolo duel reported internationally by Prescott Journal Miner which was known as "The First Bolo Duel in Manila since the American Occupation". It happened when Filipino farmers Angel Umali and Tranquilino Paglinawan met in a vacant lot near the center of the city just before dusk to settle their feuds. Paglinawan suffered the duel with his left hand cut off. With no law against bolo fights, Umali was charged only with minor charge.

==== China ====
- During the Three Kingdoms period of China, in 195 warlord Sun Ce encountered an enemy general, named Taishi Ci, by accident when both of them were scouting the other. The two fought until the arrival of their men compelled them to break off. The result was that Sun Ce seized Taishi Ci's weapon while Taishi Ci grabbed Sun Ce's helmet. There was however no record that any one of them was injured in this duel. This is one of the few examples of two generals dueling during a time of war.
- In the Eastern Han dynasty, a military general, Guo Si (who served under the warlord Dong Zhuo) challenged another powerful military general, Lü Bu to a famous duel in the Battle of Chang'an. Guo Si was defeated after he was pierced by Lü Bu's spear.
- In the Eastern Han dynasty, two of Lü Bu's military officers, Hao Meng and Cao Xing engaged in an isolated combat. During the fight, Hao Meng injured Cao Xing with his spear, and Cao Xing cut off one of Hao Meng' arms.
- In the Eastern Han dynasty, a military general, Pang De (who served under the warlord Ma Teng) slew the enemy general Guo Yuan (a subordinate of warlord Yuan Tan) in the midst of battle and took his head.
- In the Eastern Han dynasty, a military general, Yan Xing engaged the warlord Ma Teng's eldest son Ma Chao in a duel and nearly killed him by piercing him with a spear.
- In the Eastern Han dynasty, a military general, Lü Meng (who served under the warlord Sun Quan) challenged warlord Liu Biao's military general, Chen Jiu to an isolated combat and killed him.
- During the Northern and Southern Dynasties period, a Xianbei military general, Dugu Xin (who served under the Xiongnu general Erzhu Rong) challenged an enemy general, Yuan Sizhou to a duel and captured him alive.
- During the Transition from Sui to Tang, warlord Wang Shichong's general Shan Xiongxin engaged Tang's general Li Shimin in an isolated combat, nearly killing him. However, Li Shimin's guard general Yuchi Jingde arrived in time and challenged Shan Xiongxin to another duel, Shan was defeated and fell off from his horse.
- In the Tang dynasty, a military general and prince of Tang, Li Yuanji challenged another military general Yuchi Jingde to an isolated spears fight, and Li was defeated by Yuchi.
- In the Tang dynasty, a military general of Tang, Xue Rengui personally engaged 10 of Tiele Turks' strongest warriors in a small battle and killed three of them, intimidating the entire Tiele coalition and causing them to submit to Tang.
- Bai Mei, one of the legendary five elders of the Shaolin Temple, killed Jee Sin, (another one of the elders) in a brutal duel following the destruction of the Shaolin Temple.

==== India ====
- 1781: Warren Hastings had wounded Sir Philip Francis, during a duel in India.

=== Oceania ===
==== Australia ====
- 1801: Captain John Macarthur dueled Colonel William Paterson, shooting him in the shoulder. Macarthur was sent back to England to be court-martialed.
- 1826: Robert Wardell duelled with Australia's (Colony of New South Wales') first Attorney-General, Saxe Bannister. Dr Wardell had previously lost to Saxe Bannister in obtaining the Attorney-General position. A long-running feud ensued: Bannister sued Wardell for libel, with Saxe saying in a speech in open court that Wardell was the "scum of London". After three shots were fired on each side without effect, Wardell's apology was accepted.
- 1827: Robert Wardell duelled with the Colonel Henry Dumaresq, the aide-de-camp and brother-in-law of the governor of New South Wales, Ralph Darling. Dr Wardell had written an article titled "How-e to Live by Plunder", in which he claimed Dumaresq had leaked information to The Australian. Three shots were fired by each, and no one was injured.
- 1832: William Nairne Clark (barrister, news proprietor and explorer) fought a duel at Cantonment Hill, Fremantle, Western Australia, with pistols with George French Johnson (merchant), fatally wounding him in the right hip. Clark was subsequently charged with, and acquitted of, the murder of his opponent.
- 1837: Thomas Gregson, future premier of Tasmania, shot and wounded Henry Jellicoe, a supporter of former governor George Arthur, in both thighs.
- 1839: Dr. Barry Cotter challenged George Arden. They fought on the racecourse at the foot of Batman's Hill in Melbourne. Cotter fired first and missed (his bullet going through the beaver hat of his second William Meek) and Arden fired wide intentionally.
- 1840: Peter Snodgrass challenged William Ryrie, following hot words at dinner on New Year's Eve. They fought at the foot of Batman's Hill in Melbourne. Snodgrass shot himself in the toe, whereupon Ryrie fired into the air.
- 1841: Peter Snodgrass challenged Redmond Barry, who was later a Supreme Court judge. They fought near Liardet's Pier Hotel in Melbourne. Snodgrass discharged his pistol prematurely, and Barry fired into the air.
- 1842: F. A. Powlett fought a duel with Arthur Hogue at Flemington near Melbourne. There were two exchanges of shots, but no injury save to Hogue's coat, through which Powlett sent a ball each time.
- 1844: Thomas Welsh, the attorney-general of Van Diemen's Land, was involved in two pistol duels relating to a dispute with his predecessor Edward Macdowell and his brother Thomas Macdowell. A duel with the Macdowell brothers' supporter Robert Stewart ended with Stewart missing his mark and Welsh firing into a tree. After Thomas Macdowell called Welsh a "coward and scoundrel", a second duel was fought with both men deliberately missing. Welsh was subsequently dismissed as attorney-general.
- 1846: Alexander Sprot and W. J. Campbell fought a duel over the border in South Australia (having been prevented from doing so in the Port Phillip District by a Magistrates' order). Both survived.
- 1849: In Van Diemen's Land, a duel was fought between Edward Macdowell, the commissioner of the Insolvency Court, and Francis Smith, the crown solicitor and clerk of the peace. Both pistols misfired and the men agreed to discontinue the duel.
- 1851: Major Sir Thomas Mitchell confronted Sir Stuart Alexander Donaldson in Sydney. Mitchell issued the challenge because Donaldson had publicly criticised the cost of the Surveyor General's Department. Both duellists missed.

==== New Zealand ====
- 1847: Colonel William Wakefield and Dr Isaac Featherston (who was his doctor) met in Wellington after Featherston had questioned Wakefield's honesty in a newspaper editorial on the New Zealand Company land policy. Featherston fired and missed, then Wakefield fired into the air, saying that he would not shoot a man with seven daughters. See 1966 Encyclopaedia of New Zealand for other New Zealand duels.

=== Europe ===
==== France ====
- July 10, 1547: Guy Chabot de Jarnac, in a judicial duel with François de Vivonne de la Châtaigneraie, a favourite of the King and one of France's greatest swordsmen. Jarnac fooled La Châtaigneraie with a feint and hit him with a slash to the hamstrings. His dignity offended, La Châtaigneraie refused medical aid, and died. This both ended the practice of trial by combat in France, and created the myth of "Le Coup de Jarnac" – a legendary strike that supposedly allowed amateurs to defeat masters.
- 27 April 1578: Duel of the Mignons claims the lives of two favorites of Henry III of France and two favorites of Henry I, Duke of Guise.
- 12 May 1627: at the Place Royale in Paris, François de Montmorency-Bouteville dueled François d'Harcourt Beuvron without fatality, but Montmorency-Bouteville's second, François de Rosmadec, Comte de Chappelles, dueled and killed Beuvron's second, the Marquis de Bussi d'Amboise. While Beuvron took refuge in England, Montmorency and Rosmadec, despite their nobility, were beheaded at the Place de Grève in Paris on 22 June 1627.
- 1641: Kenelm Digby and a French nobleman named Mont le Ros. Digby, a founding member of the Royal Society, was attending a banquet in France when the Frenchman insulted King Charles I of England and Digby challenged him to a duel. Digby wrote that he ".. run his rapier into the French Lord's breast until it came out of his throat again"; Mont le Ros fell dead.
- 10 September 1718: Countess de Polignac and Marquise de Nesle fight a duel in the Bois de Boulogne in Paris in rivalry over their mutual lover the Duke de Richelieu.
- 31 January 1772: Mademoiselle de Guignes and Mademoiselle d'Aguillon fight a duel in Paris.
- 16 March 1778: The staged duel between Charles-Philippe de France, Comte d'Artois, and Louis VI Henri Joseph de Bourbon-Condé, Duc de Bourbon, takes place. The affair is known as An Incident at the Opera Ball on Mardi Gras in 1778.
- 1794 to 1813: Pierre Dupont de l'Étang and François Fournier-Sarlovèze fought over 30 duels, beginning with Fournier challenging Dupont after the latter had delivered a disagreeable message to his fellow officer. Dupont eventually overcame his opponent 19 years later in a pistol duel, and forced Fournier to promise never to bother him again. The story was immortalized by Joseph Conrad and made into the movie The Duellists by Ridley Scott.
- 1830: French writer Sainte-Beuve and one of the owners of Le Globe newspaper, Paul-François Dubois, fought a duel under a heavy rain. Sainte-Beuve held his umbrella during the duel claiming that he did not mind dying but that he would not get wet.
- 1832: British officer Charles Hesse was fatally shot by Charles Léon in the Bois de Vincennes following a dispute over cards.
- 1832: Évariste Galois and (possibly) Pescheux d'Herbinville; Évariste Galois, the French mathematician, died of his wounds at the age of twenty.
- 23 February 1870: Édouard Manet and Louis Edmond Duranty; Duranty, an art critic and friend of Manet, had written only the briefest of commentary on two works of art that Manet had entered for exhibition. The frustrated Manet collared Duranty at the Café Guerbois and slapped him. Duranty's demands for an apology were refused and so the men fought a duel with swords in the Forest of Saint-Germain-en-Laye three days later on the 23rd. Émile Zola acted as Manet's second and Paul Alexis acted for Duranty. After Duranty received a wound above the right breast the seconds stepped in and declared that honour had been satisfied. The men remained friends despite the encounter.
- 1888: General Georges Boulanger and Charles Floquet (Prime Minister of the French Republic); the General was wounded in the throat but survived.
- 5 February 1897: Marcel Proust fought journalist Jean Lorrain, after Lorrain published an excoriating review of Proust's first book "Pleasures and Days" and hinted that Proust was having an affair with Julia Daudet's son, Lucien. Proust and Lorrain exchanged shots at 25 paces. Proust fired first, his bullet hitting the ground by Lorrain's foot. Lorrain's shot missed, and the seconds agreed that honor had been satisfied.
- On 15 January 1904 during a debate in the French Chamber of Deputies on the subject of Labour Exchange Riots, Marcel Sembat and Jean-Baptiste Boutard exchanged remarks that led to them meeting the following morning at an undisclosed location in Paris where shots were exchanged without effect.
- 7 October 1949. Film director Willy Rozier challenged film critic Francois Chalais over comments Chalais had made about actress Marie Dea in Rozier's 1949 film 56 Rue Pigalle. Fought with rapiers in a forest, and to first blood, not death, Rozier wounded Chalais in the right forearm in the third round, winning the encounter in front of a dozen journalists and photographers. The film would go on to become a hit in France, vindicating Rozier further. Silent film footage of the arrangements being made for the fight in a Parisian alley, and of the duel itself, are included as an extra on the DVD release of the film.
- 20 April 1949: Duel between Armand Fevre and Pierre Merindol.
- 21 April 1967: The last official duel in the history of France happened between Gaston Defferre and René Ribière, both delegates at the French National Assembly. During an argument in the assembly room, Defferre said to Ribière "shut up, idiot" ("taisez-vous, abruti"). Defferre won the duel after four minutes of sword fighting, wounding his opponent twice.

==== Germany ====
- 1704: Composer George Friderich Handel was nearly killed in a duel with Johann Mattheson.
- 1852: Georg von Vincke and the later Reich Chancellor Otto von Bismarck. Both emerged unharmed from the duel.
- 1864: Socialist politician and philosopher Ferdinand Lassalle was killed in a duel with Iancu Racoviță, who had become betrothed to Lassalle's intended, Helene von Dönniges.
- August 1892: Pauline von Metternich was alleged to have taken part in a sword duel with Anastasia, wife of Count Erich Kielmansegg.

==== Great Britain and Ireland ====
- 1597: Sir William Brooke (son of William Brooke, 10th Baron Cobham) was fatally wounded in a duel with Thomas Lucas (son of Sir Thomas Lucas) at Mile End Green, Essex, in December. The Privy Council issued warrants for Lucas' arrest on 24 and 29 December 1597, but he fled to the continent and was later pardoned.
- 1598: Playwright Ben Jonson kills actor Gabriel Spenser in a duel fought with swords. The cause is unknown.
- 1609: Sir George Wharton and Sir James Stuart fought a duel over a game of cards in Islington. Both were killed and buried in the same grave.
- 1609: Sir Hatton Cheke and Sir Thomas Dutton fought in Calais. Cheke was killed.
- 1613: Edward Bruce, 2nd Lord Kinloss, and Sir Edward Sackville (later 4th Earl of Dorset), fought a duel over Venetia Stanley. They fought in Bergen-op-Zoom, Netherlands, to avoid the wrath of the King; Lord Bruce was killed, but Venetia Stanley ended up marrying Sir Kenelm Digby.
- 1613: Grey Brydges, 5th Baron Chandos, and James Hay (later 1st Earl of Carlisle)
- 1652: George Brydges, 6th Baron Chandos, and Colonel Henry Compton (grandson of Henry Compton, 1st Baron Compton); Compton was killed, Chandos was found guilty of manslaughter and died whilst imprisoned.
- 1668: George Villiers (later 2nd Duke of Buckingham) and Francis Talbot, 11th Earl of Shrewsbury; Shrewsbury was killed, and George Villiers' second Sir J. Jenkins was killed by the Earl's second.
- 1694: John Law and Edward Wilson; Wilson challenged Law over the affections of Elizabeth Villiers (later Countess of Orkney); Wilson was killed. Law was tried and found guilty of murder and sentenced to death. His sentence was commuted to a fine, upon the ground that the offence only amounted to manslaughter. Wilson's brother appealed and had Law imprisoned but he managed to escape to the continent.
- 1698: Oliver Le Neve and Sir Henry Hobart, 4th Baronet on Cawston Heath, Norfolk; Sir Henry was killed and Le Neve fled to Holland.
- 1711: Richard Thornhill, Esq and Sir Cholmeley Dering, 4th Baronet; Sir Cholmeley was killed and Richard Thornhill convicted of manslaughter.
- 1712: Hamilton–Mohun duel in Hyde Park, London. Both participants Charles Mohun, 4th Baron Mohun, and James Douglas, 4th Duke of Hamilton, were killed. Their seconds George Macartney, Esq, and Colonel John Hamilton were found guilty of manslaughter.
- 1731: George Lockhart of Carnwath, Scottish spy, writer and politician, killed in a duel in Scotland.
- 1731: William Pulteney, 1st Earl of Bath, and John Hervey, 2nd Baron Hervey
- 1736: Henry St Lawrence and Hamilton Gorges: Gorges kills St Lawrence, is tried for murder but acquitted.
- 1749: Captain Clarke R.N. and Captain Innis R.N; Innis was killed. Clarke was sentenced to death but received a Royal Pardon.
- 1761: Richard Nugent, Lord Delvin was killed by Captain George Reilly at Marlborough Bowling Green in Dublin close to present day Tyrone House and Marlborough Street. It led to the abandonment of the area as a fashionable enclave.
- 1762: John Wilkes and Samuel Martin in Hyde Park. Martin, in his place in the House of Commons, had alluded to Wilkes as a "stabber in the dark, a cowardly and malignant scoundrel." Wilkes prided himself as much upon his gallantry as upon his wit and loyalty, and lost no time in calling Martin out. The challenge was given as soon as the House adjourned, and the parties repaired at once to a copse in Hyde Park with a brace of pistols. They fired four times, when Wilkes fell, wounded in the abdomen. His antagonist, relenting, hastened up and insisted on helping him off the ground; but Wilkes, with comparative courtesy, as strenuously urged Martin to hurry away, so as to escape arrest. It afterwards appeared that Martin had been practising in a shooting gallery for six months before making the obnoxious speech in the House; and soon after, instead of being arrested, he received a valuable appointment from the ministry.
- 1765: William Byron, 5th Baron Byron and William Chaworth; Chaworth was killed. Byron was tried in the House of Lords and acquitted of murder, but found guilty of manslaughter, for which he was fined.
- 1772: Richard Brinsley Sheridan and Captain Matthews; as the result of a quarrel between the two concerning Elizabeth Linley, to whom Sheridan was already secretly married, both men went to Hyde Park, but on finding it too crowded repaired instead to the Castle Tavern, Covent Garden, where they fought with swords. Both men were cut, but neither was seriously wounded. Sheridan won this duel as Mathews pleaded for his life after losing his sword. They fought a second duel in July at Kingsdown near Bath to resolve a dispute over the first duel. Both men's swords broke, and Mathews stabbed Sheridan several times, seriously wounding him, before escaping in a post chaise.
- 1779: Charles James Fox and Mr Adams
- 1780: William Petty, 2nd Earl of Shelburne, and Colonel Fullarton
- 1783: Richard Martin ("Humanity Dick"), who engaged in over 100 duels, fought George "Fighting" FitzGerald in the Castlebar barrack yard. Later in the same year Martin's cousin, James Jordan forces a duel: Jordan is shot and dies of his wounds. As a result of this, Martin later refuses to duel with Theobald Wolfe Tone, even though he was having an affair with his wife.
- 1786: Lord Macartney and Major-General James Stuart; Lord Macartney was wounded.
- 1787: Sir John MacPherson and a Major Browne; Browne had been British Resident at the court of Shah Alam II, he took offence at his recall and challenged MacPherson, the former governor-general of India, on the latter's return to Britain. A pistol ball passed through MacPherson's coat and another struck a pocketbook in his coat pocket, but the two men were uninjured.
- 1789: HRH Prince Frederick, Duke of York and Albany, and Lieutenant-Colonel Charles Lennox; Lennox had called the Prince out after the Prince had accused him of making ".. certain expressions unworthy of a gentleman". Lennox had no recollection of making such expressions and his demands for a retraction were refused. Lennox demanded satisfaction; the two men met with pistols on Wimbledon Common on 26 May 1789. According to a report in The Times by the seconds, Lord Rawdon for the Prince and Lord Winchilsea for Lennox, Lennox's shot "grazed His Royal Highnesses' curl". The Prince then refused to fire stating that he had been called out to give satisfaction to Lennox and the satisfaction had been given and the matter was closed.
- 1791: Mr John Graham pleader of the Temple called out Richard Julius Attorney of Lincolns Inn over a hypocrisy in affairs of gallantry. They met 12 July on Blackheath where Graham received a ball to his groin which proved fatal. The papers of the day were outraged see http://www.thekingscandlesticks.com/webs/pedigrees/710.html
- 1791: On 23 November 1791, a duel, originating in a trifling dispute, was fought near Newmarket, between Henry Applewhaite and Richard Rycroft, students at Pembroke Hall, Cambridge University. Rycroft was so severely wounded that he died two days later. Applewhaite and his second, John Hollond of Trinity College, were expelled from the University. At the Bury Lent Assizes of 1792, Applewhaite surrendered and stood trial for the murder of Rycroft. The bill was ignored by the grand jury, no evidence was offered on the coroner's inquisition, and he was acquitted. It is said that on this occasion "the flower of the University voluntarily came forward to give testimony of his generally amiable character."
- 1792: Lady Almeria Braddock and Mrs Elphinstone; so called "petticoat duel"; Lady Almeria Braddock felt insulted by Mrs Elphinstone and challenged her to a duel in London's Hyde Park after their genteel conversation turned to the subject of Lady Almeria's true age. The ladies first exchanged pistol shots in which Lady Almeria's hat was damaged. They then continued with swords until Mrs. Elphinstone received a wound to her arm and agreed to write Lady Almeria an apology.
- 1792: Mr O'Conner acquitted of the murder of Capt. Kerr, in a duel.
- 1798: Pitt–Tierney duel. William Pitt the Younger and George Tierney; both emerged unscathed.
- 1799: Colonel Ashton and Major Allen; Duel took place in India; Ashton was killed.
- 1803: Captain James Macnamara and Colonel Montgomery; over a dispute between their dogs fighting in Hyde Park. Both were wounded, Montgomery mortally. Macnamara was tried for manslaughter at the Old Bailey but was acquitted.
- 1804: Captain Best fatally wounded Thomas Pitt, 2nd Baron Camelford. He died three days later.
- 1804: A duel was fought on Kersal Moor, Salford, in July 1804 between Mr. Jones and Mr. Shakspere Philips. Mr. Jones fired at Mr. Philips without effect and Mr. Philips then fired his pistol in the air, upon which the seconds interfered, the two man shook hands, and honour was satisfied.
- 1807: Sir Francis Burdett, 5th Baronet and James Paull; both men were wounded.
- 1807: Major Alexander Campbell and Captain Alexander Boyd, a married man with six children, were officers in the second battalion 21st (later the Royal Scots Fusiliers) Regiment of Foot, based at Newry Barracks in Northern Ireland. After dinner in their mess on the evening of 22 June 1807 there was a disagreement between them on the topic of tactical regimental manoeuvring. Ultimately, Major Campbell insisted that Captain Boyd fight him, and after the doors to the mess were closed pistols were obtained and they duelled in the mess that evening. There was not enough room to pace out the full distance and when they wheeled to fire their pistols were almost touching. The Major shot the Captain in the abdomen and within a few hours he died as a result of his wound. The Major fled. A warrant was issued for his arrest but he evaded capture for some months and was treated as an outlaw. At trial on 4 August 1808 Major Campbell was found guilty of wilful murder and he was hanged at Newry on 24 August 1808.
- 1809: Castlereagh–Canning duel. George Canning and Lord Castlereagh; Canning was slightly wounded.
- 1809: Henry Paget, 1st Marquess of Anglesey, and Henry Cadogan; The contest took place on Wimbledon Common. Both men discharged their pistols, honour was satisfied and the parties left the field uninjured.
- 1815: Daniel O'Connell and Captain John Norcot d'Esterre; d'Esterre was killed.
- 1821: John Scott and Jonathon Henry Christie. Scott was the founder and editor of the London Magazine. The duel was born out of the Cockney School controversy. John Gibson Lockhart had been abusing many of Scott's contributors in Blackwood's Magazine (under a pseudonym (Z), as was then common). In May 1820, Scott began a series of counter-articles, which provoked Lockhart into calling him "a liar and a scoundrel". In February 1820, Lockhart's London agent, J.H. Christie, made a provocative statement, and Scott challenged him. They met on 16 February 1821, at a farm between Camden Town and Hampstead. Christie did not fire in the first round, but there was a misunderstanding between the seconds, resulting in a second round. Scott was hit in the abdomen, and died 11 days later. Christie and his second were tried for willful murder and acquitted; the collection for Scott's family was a notable radical cause.
- 1822: James Stuart and Alexander Boswell.
- 1822: Richard Temple-Grenville, 1st Duke of Buckingham and Chandos, and Francis Russell, 7th Duke of Bedford.
- 1824: The 3rd Marquess of Londonderry and Ensign Battier; Battier was a cornet in the Marquess' regiment. When Battier's pistol misfired, he declined the offer of another shot and left. He was later horsewhipped by the Marquess' second Sir Henry Hardinge.
- 1826: David Landale, a linen merchant from Kirkcaldy, duelled with his bank manager, George Morgan, who had slandered his business reputation. This was the last duel to be fought on Scottish soil; George Morgan, a trained soldier, was shot through the chest and mortally wounded by Landale, who had never before held a pistol. Landale was tried for murder but found not guilty. The subject of a book "Duel" by his descendant James Landale.
- 1826: Early in the morning of 23 January 1826, James Edward Devereux, of Carigmenan, accompanied by his second F. Joyce Esq., and John Hyacinth Talbot, of Talbot Hall, accompanied by his second, William Harvey, of Kyle, came together at Annice, in the county of Kilkenny, in Ireland. The meeting arose out of some unpleasant feelings excited by Mr Devereux having presided at meetings of Catholics in the county, to which Mr Talbot objected. Both gentlemen fired, without effect.
- 1829: Wellington–Winchilsea duel. The Duke of Wellington and the 10th Earl of Winchilsea; both aimed wide.
- 1832: On 8 March 1832, Sir J. de Veulle, Chief Magistrate of the Island of Jersey, and Charles de Lagarde, had a "hostile meeting," at the Jardin d'Olivet on Jersey. After exchanging two shots each they shook hands and separated.
- 1835: William Arden, 2nd Baron Alvanley, and Morgan O'Connell, son of Daniel O'Connell. Alvanley asserted that Morgan's father had been "purchased" by William Lamb, 2nd Viscount Melbourne on his accession to the office of Prime Minister, O'Connell retorted by calling Alvanley "a bloated buffoon".
- 1839: The 3rd Marquess of Londonderry and Henry Gratton
- 1840: James Thomas Brudenell, 7th Earl of Cardigan, and Captain Harvey Garnett Phipps Tuckett; Captain Tuckett was wounded. Cardigan was arrested, tried in the House of Lords and was acquitted.
- 1840: Prince Louis Napoleon and Charles, Count Léon; Police arrived to prevent the duel; both men were arrested and taken to Bow Street Prison.
- 1841: Malachy Kelly of Woodmount House (Tonalig, Co. Roscommon) & Owen Lynch of Woodpark Lodge (Rathpeak, Co. Roscommon). Both men were sons of local landlords, Hugh Kelly & Owen Lynch Snr. It is understood that the duel arose over a dispute during a horse race meeting a few weeks previous. The Duel was held on Ballygill Bridge, Ballinasloe, over the River Suck on the Roscommon/Galway border on 28 May 1841. Malachy Kelly died of his wounds five days later on 3 June. (Freemans Journal, Dublin, 07/06/1841). This is the last known fatal duel to have taken place in Ireland.
- 1842: On the evening of 11 July 1842, in the lobby of the House of Commons, in the presence of several other persons, Craven Berkeley, then the MP for Cheltenham, asked Captain Henry Boldero, the MP for Chippenham, what he, Boldero, would do, if, hypothetically, a drunk person were to damn the Queen in his presence. There are two versions of Captain Boldero's reply. The Morning Chronicle of 13 July, claims that he replied, "that if any person in his presence, whether drunk or sober, chose to damn the Queen, he would take no notice of it; for he would be no eaves-dropper." Captain Boldero took exception to this version and wrote to several of those persons present and asked them what they thought he had said. Five of these men, all Members of Parliament, Henry Liddell, W. Thompson, Charles Douglas, Beriah Botfield, and William Cripps, all replied that his answer had not included the words, "or sober." He had said that if a drunk person damned the Queen in his presence he would wait until the following morning when he was sober, and deal with the matter then. Captain Boldero then wrote to Craven Berkeley and asked him if he knew who had written to the newspaper, and Berkeley replied that he did not, but that the version in the newspaper was "substantially correct." Captain Boldero replied suggesting that, "either your memory must have failed you in a very extraordinary manner, or you are intentionally perverting the true facts of the case." Berkeley took exception to, essentially, being accused of lying about it, and neither man being prepared to back down or apologise they nominated their seconds. Mr Berkeley was accompanied by the Hon William Ridley-Colborne, MP, and Capt Boldero by Mr W. F. Mackenzie, MP. They met at five o'clock on the morning of 15 July in the neighbourhood of Osterley Park, a large country house in West London that was then the home of George Child-Villiers, 5th Earl of Jersey. Having exchanged shots without effect, they left the ground.
- 1843: Colonel Fawcett and his brother-in-law, Lieutenant Monro, in Camden; Colonel Fawcett was killed.
- 1845: Lieutenant Henry Charles Moorhead Hawkey, Royal Marines, and James Alexander Seton; Seton died on 2 June, some days after the duel, as a result of an infected gunshot wound. Seton was the last known Briton to die because of a duel fought on British soil. This is recorded in other sites as having taken place at Browndown Camp, Gosport, Hampshire.
- 1851: Mr William Henry Gregory and Captain the Hon. George Lawrence Vaughan, The duel took place in Osterley Park.
- 1852: The last recorded fatal duel on British soil was fought by Lt. Frederic Constant Cournet and Emmanuel Barthélemy, two French political refugees. The duel took place on Priest's Hill in Englefield Green. Barthelemy killed Cournet and was subsequently arrested for murder. However, he was later convicted only of manslaughter, and served a few months in prison. Barthelemy was hanged in 1855 after he shot and killed two men in the course of a violent struggle.

==== Italy ====
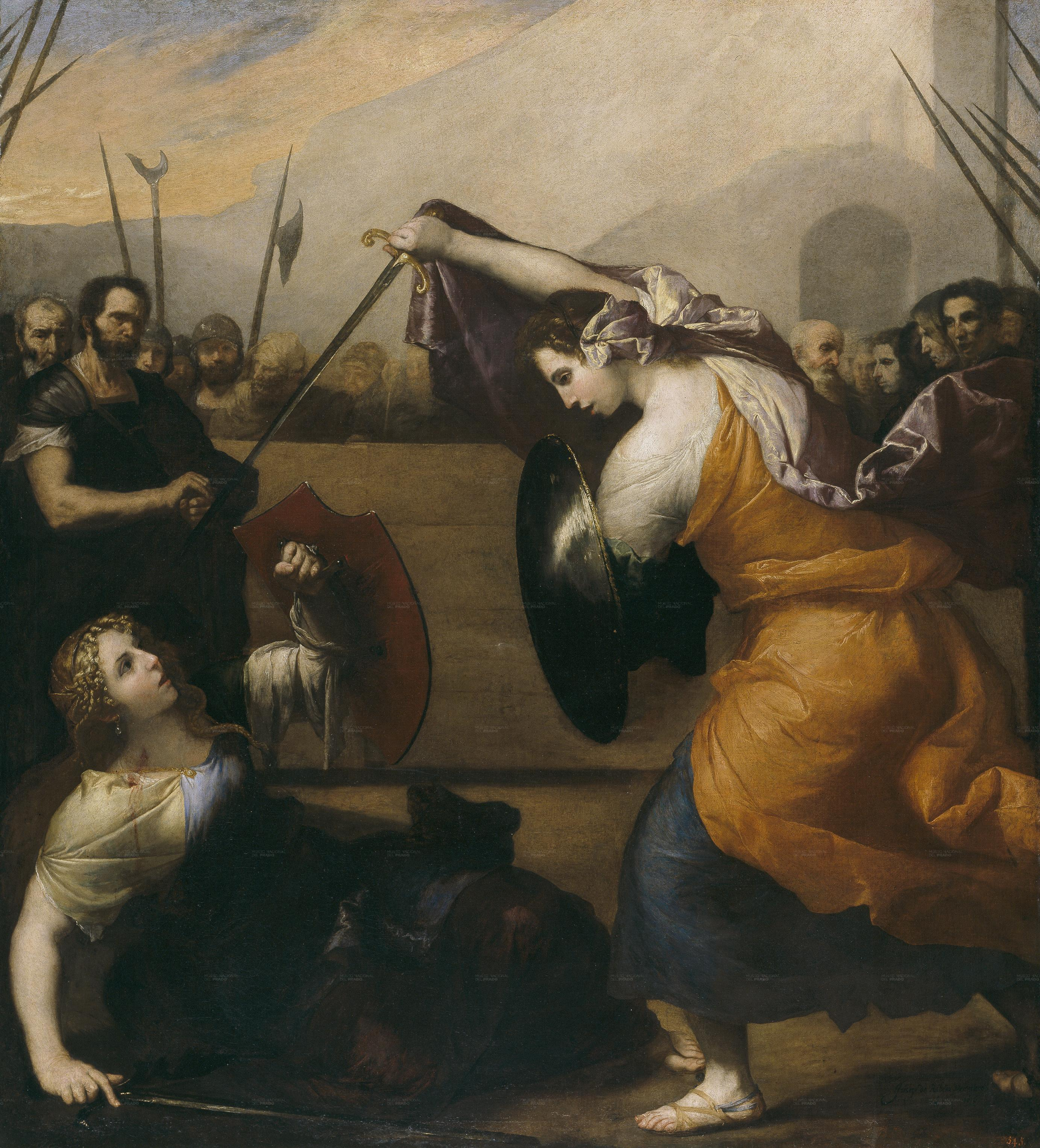
Women Gladiators (Jusepe de Ribera, 1636)

- 1552: Isabella de Carazi and Diambra de Petinella fight a duel in rivalry about a common lover, Fabio de Zeresola: the duel became famous and the object of a painting by Jusepe de Ribera, Women Gladiators
- 1898: Italian politician Felice Cavallotti was killed in a duel with Count Ferruccio Macola, whom he had insulted.
- 1921: Benito Mussolini seriously wounded Francisco Ciccotti, at the time an editor in Rome, in a duel with swords. The duel lasted an hour and a quarter and ended with Ciccotti unable to continue due to wounds received.

==== Malta ====
- 1802: Lieutenant Colonel John Baylis shot a fellow officer and reportedly close acquaintance in a pistol duel at Fort San Salvatore, on the island of Malta. Baylis had challenged a Captain Richard Newman to the duel, believing him to have been having an affair with his wife. Newman was mortally wounded and died in a military hospital in the island on 13 May 1802. Baylis was removed from his command and returned to Britain; although he was found innocent in a subsequent court martial.

==== Portugal ====
- 1924: Prime Minister Álvaro de Castro fought a duel with swords with Flight Captain Ribeiro over a political dispute. The duel ended with Ribeiro being wounded in the arm.
- 1925: António Beja da Silva, the vice-mayor of Lisbon, fought António Centeno, the president of the portuguese Reunited Gas and Electricity company (Companhias Reunidas de Gás e Eletricidade), over the rising prices of gas.

==== Russia ====
- 1666: First recorded Russian duel featured two foreigners living at the German Quarter – Major Patrick Gordon and Major Montgomery.
- March 3, 1801: Prince Boris Svyatopolk-Chetvertinsky challenged statesman Alexander Ribeaupierre for his alleged affair with Anna Lopukhina, a royal mistress. With heavily chopped arm, Ribeaupierre was exiled soon after the duel.
- ca. 1807: Cavalryman Michael Lunin challenged Prince Alexey Orlov after latter permitted him to do so. Orlov, having harsh shooting skills, missed twice from twelve steps (first shot, however, hit Lunin's epaulette, and second holed his hat), while Lunin, being a notable marksman, kept stiff upper lip and also missed twice on purpose – shooting upwards in the skies, he then taught the Prince in French language, how to aim and squeeze the trigger properly, laughing at infuriated nobleman during the process. Third shot never happened. Details are still debated.
- 1808: Gen. Nikolay Tuchkov was challenged by Prince Mikhail Dolgorukov. It happened amidst the Finnish War, so Tuchkov proposed to Dolgorukov, who also has the rank of a general, instead of conventional duel, to make joint appearance on the frontline, so a seldom enemy bullet could justify the argument. So was their decision, and Dolgorukov has been killed soon by a cannonball flown from Swedish lines.
- 1814: Congress of Vienna: The Coalition's stubborn refusal to hand over all of Poland to Russia leads a tense Tsar Alexander I of Russia to supposedly challenge Metternich to a duel. The tsar changes his mind however and Poland is partitioned once more.
- 1817: The honour of celebrated ballerina Avdotia Istomina occasioned a fourfold duel: kammerjunker count Alexander Zavadovsky kills podporutchik (lieutenant) of Chevalier Guards Regiment Basily Sheremetev (from not-titulated cadet branche of Sheremetev family), while the future Decembrist Yakubovich shot through a palm of the playwright Alexander Griboedov.
- 1823: Mysterious duel of Aleksandr Pushkin with the poet Kondraty Ryleyev, who was also a leader of the Decembrists
- 1823: General and rising statesman Pavel Kiselyov kills general Ivan Mordvinov; the duel was Mordvinov's call
- 1825: Duel between Konstantin Chernov and Vladimir Novosiltsev; both were mortally wounded, and the funeral of Chernov had turned into a first political demonstration in Russia, three months before the Decembrist revolt
- 1820s: Fyodor Ivanovich Tolstoy killed eleven officers in various duels
- 1836: Nicholas I of Russia challenged by a nobleman
- 1837: The most famous and talked about Russian duel: Aleksandr Pushkin mortally wounded after a gunshot he received in a duel at the Black Rivulet with a French officer on Russian service Georges d'Anthès, rumoured to have an affair with Pushkin's wife Natalia. D'Anthès went on to become French minister and senator and married Pushkin's sister-in-law (a few weeks before the duel, in a last attempt to avoid the confrontation).
- 1840: There was to be a duel between Mikhail Bakunin and Mikhail Katkov, but it was called off.
- 1841: Mikhail Lermontov killed in a duel with Nikolai Martynov, a year after his duel with De Barante, son of the French ambassador to Russia.
- 1908: Lieutenant General Konstantin Smirnov was seriously wounded in a pistol duel with Lieutenant General Alexander Fok. Fok challenged Smirnov after Smirnov publicly accused Fok of incompetence during the Siege of Port Arthur.
- 1909: Another parliamentary duel – Alexander Guchkov vs Count Alexei Uvarov.
- 1909: Two first-rank Russian poets, Nikolay Gumilyov and Maksimilian Voloshin, dueled for the heart of a non-existent woman, poet Cherubina de Gabriak, at the Black Rivulet in St. Petersburg.

==== Serbia ====
- 1926. Disagreements over whether the national aero club should order French or German planes caused a quarrel between writer Miloš Crnjanski and pilot and officer Tadija Sondermayer. After a heated argument, Crnjanski challenged Tadija to a duel. Crnjanski was the first to shoot and miss, after which Tadija shot into the air and said that he was giving up.

==== Spain ====
- 1569 Miguel de Cervantes bated but did not kill Antonio Sigura.
- 1611 Holy Thursday, Francisco de Quevedo killed a man with his sword for hitting a lady in a church.
- 1818 Manuel Bretón de los Herreros, lost an eye in Jerez de la Frontera
- 12 March 1870 Duel between Antoine, Duke of Montpensier and Enrique de Borbón, Duke of Seville. Both were brothers-in-law of Isabel II. Montepensier killed Enrique de Borbón.
- February 1904 Vicente Blasco Ibáñez with a policeman. Blasco was hurt.

==== Sweden ====
- 1788: Count Adolph Ribbing and Baron Hans Henrik von Essen; the duel was held because Essen's proposal had been accepted by the father of a woman, the heiress Charlotta Eleonora De Geer, whom Ribbing had also proposed to and whom he believed to be in love with him. Essen was injured and Ribbing declared winner. The duel was regarded a scandal and a crime against the king

==== Switzerland ====
- August 28, 1864: Ferdinand Lassalle and Count von Racowitza. Lassalle was mortally wounded, and died three days later. Racowitza also died the next year.

=== Americas ===
==== Argentina ====
- 1814: Buenos Aires. Colonel Luis Carrera, brother of Chilean revolutionary General José Miguel Carrera, killed Colonel Juan Mackenna in a duel. The reason was the sense of honor that the Carreras had, as Mackenna disrespected the family name many times. This was the second time that both duellists met, and the third time that Mackenna was challenged in a duel by a Carrera (the first time it was by Luis Carrera himself, while the second time it was by his brother, Juan José Carrera, the oldest of the brothers and noticeable by his strength. Yet Mackenna was able to run away from the duels both times). They dueled at night, in the first round, Mackenna shot at his head, but missed and blew Carrera's hat away, in the second round, Carrera was able to hit Mackenna in his hand, blowing his thumb away and piercing a hole in his throat, thus killing Mackenna. Carrera was arrested the next day, particularly because Mackenna was part of a secret society called Lautaro Lodge, which had the control of the government at the time.
- November 3, 1968, Buenos Aires. Admiral Benigno Ignacio Varela and journalist Yolivan Biglieri were protagonists of the last duel known to have taken place in Argentina according to the rules of chivalry.

==== Canada ====
- 1800: John White, 39, Upper Canada's first lawyer and a founder of the law society, was fatally shot on January 3, 1800, by a government official named John Small, who challenged him to the duel. White was alleged to have gossiped at a Christmas party that Mrs. Small was once the mistress of the Duke of Berkeley in England, who had tired of her and paid Small to marry her and take her to the colonies.
- 1817: John Ridout, 18, was shot dead on July 12, 1817, at the corner of what is now Bay St. and Grosvenor St. in Toronto by Samuel Peters Jarvis, 25. The reason for the duel was unclear. On the count of two, the nervous Ridout discharged his pistol early, missing Jarvis by a wide margin. Ridout's second, James Small (whose father survived the only other duel in York) and Jarvis' second, Henry John Boulton insisted that Jarvis be allowed to make his shot. Ridout protested loudly and asked for another pistol, but Small and Boulton were adamant that the strict code of duelling must be observed. Jarvis shot and killed Ridout instantly. Jarvis was pardoned by the courts, even though he had shot an unarmed man.
- 1819: What historians have called "The Most Ferocious Duel" in Canadian history took place on April 11, 1819, at Windmill Point near the Lachine Canal. The opponents were William Caldwell, a doctor at the Montreal General Hospital, and Michael O'Sullivan, a member of the Legislative Assembly of Lower Canada. The dispute arose when Caldwell accused O'Sullivan of lacking courage. The two opponents exchanged fire an unheard-of five times. O'Sullivan was wounded twice in the process, and in the final volley, he took a bullet to the chest and hit the ground. Caldwell's arm was shattered by a shot; a hole in his collar proved he narrowly missed being shot in the neck. Amazingly, neither participant died during the fight, although both took a long time to recover. O'Sullivan went on to become Chief Justice of the Court of King's Bench in Montreal, and when he died in 1839, an autopsy revealed a bullet still lodged against the middle of his spine.
- 1826: Rudkin versus John Philpot a duel fought in Newfoundland at St. John's who met at West's Farm near Brine's Tavern at the foot of Robinson's Hill, adjacent to Brine's River to settle their seemingly long standing differences that was further exacerbated by the love of an Irish colleen who lived in a cottage near Quidi Vidi and a game of cards that ended in an argument over the ownership of the pot.
- 1833: The last fatal duel in Upper Canada was fought in Perth, Ontario, on June 13, 1833. Two law students and former friends, John Wilson and Robert Lyon, quarrelled over remarks Lyon made about a local schoolteacher, Elizabeth Hughes. Lyon was killed in the second exchange of shots on a rain-soaked field. Wilson was acquitted of murder, eventually married Miss Hughes, became a Member of Parliament, and later a judge.
- 1836: Clément-Charles Sabrevois de Bleury, a member of the Lower Canadian Legislative Assembly, insulted fellow politician Charles-Ovide Perreault. Perreault then struck de Bleury, and a duel was set. Both men were determined to settle the matter with pistols, but their seconds came up with a unique solution. The two foes would clasp hands and de Bleury would say, "I am sorry to have insulted you" while at the same time Perreault would say, "I am sorry to have struck you." They would then reply in unison, "I accept your apology." The tactic worked, and the situation was resolved without injury.
- 1837: William Collis Meredith and James Scott. On 9 August 1837, at eight o’clock in the evening, Meredith (who had articled under the previously mentioned Clement-Charles Sabrevois de Bleury from 1831 to 1833) and Scott (no stranger to duels) stepped out to face one another on the slopes of Mount Royal, behind Montreal. Earlier that day, following a dispute over legal costs, Meredith had challenged Scott. Meredith chose James M. Blackwood to second him, whilst Scott's choice was Louis-Fereol Pelletier. The pistols used were Meredith's which he had bought in London, on a previous trip to England. On the first exchange Scott took a bullet high up in his thigh, and the duel was called to a stop. The bullet lodged itself in Scott's thigh bone in such a way that it could not be removed by doctors, which caused him great discomfort for the rest of his days. Ironically for Scott, this was exactly where he had shot Sweeney Campbell in a duel when they were students. In the early 1850s (Scott died in 1852), when both the adversaries had become judges, one of the sights then to see was Meredith helping his brother judge up the steep Court House steps, a result of the lameness in his leg that had remained with Scott since their encounter. Meredith was later knighted and went on to serve as Chief Justice of the Superior Court of the Province of Quebec.
- 1840: Joseph Howe was called out by a member of Nova Scotian high society for his populist writing. When his opponent fired first and missed, Howe fired his shot in the air and won the right to refuse future challenges.
- 1873: The last duel in what is now Canada occurred in August 1873, in a field near St. John's, Newfoundland (which was not Canadian territory at the time). The duellists, Mr. Dooley and Mr. Healey, once friends, had fallen in love with the same young lady, and had quarrelled bitterly over her. One challenged the other to a duel, and they quickly arranged a time and place. No one else was present that morning except the two men's seconds. When they had counted off the standard ten yards, they turned and fired. Dooley hit the ground immediately. Healey, believing he had killed Dooley, was seized with horror. But Dooley had merely fainted; the seconds confessed they had so feared the outcome that they loaded the pistols with blanks. Although this was a serious breach of duelling etiquette, both opponents gratefully agreed that honour had indeed been satisfied.

==== Chile ====
- 1952: Senator Salvador Allende and his colleague Raúl Rettig (later president of Chile and head of a commission that investigated human rights violations committed during the 1973–1990 military rule in Chile, respectively), agreed to fire one shot on each other and both failed. At that time duelling was already illegal in Chile.

==== Uruguay ====
- 1920: Former President José Batlle y Ordóñez shot and killed Washington Beltrán Barbat in a formal duel. The former president challenged Beltrán, a journalist after he became offended by statements published by Beltrán in the newspaper El País. The former president was no stranger to duels having previously challenged two others, whom he considered to have besmirched his dignity.

== Proposed duels ==
- In the summer of 30 BC Mark Antony challenged Octavian to a duel, after Octavian defeated Antony at the battle of Actium the year before and threatened to take Alexandria. Octavian refused the challenge.
- Somewhere in 1889–1891, Filipino national heroes José Rizal and Antonio Luna almost fought a duel while they were in Europe. The two men were courting the same woman named Nellie Boustead, and when a drunken Luna made unsavory remarks about Rizal, the latter then challenged him to a duel. Luna, however, backed down and apologized before any fighting could commence.
- 1892: Charles Kingston challenged Richard Chaffey Baker to a duel. Kingston procured two dueling pistols and sent one accompanied with a letter to his opponent. Baker informed the police who arrested Kingston in Adelaide's Victoria Square.
- In 1943 German field marshal Günther von Kluge challenged general Heinz Guderian to a duel with pistols, after several confrontations during the preparations for the Battle of Kursk. Although Guderian accepted, the duel did not happen because Hitler refused to give his permission.
- In October 2002, four months before the US invasion of Iraq, Iraqi Vice President Taha Yassin Ramadan suggested U.S. President George W. Bush and Saddam Hussein settle their difference in a duel. He reasoned this would not only serve as an alternative to a war that was certain to damage Iraq's infrastructure, but that it would also reduce the suffering of the Iraqi and American peoples. Ramadan's offer included the possibility that a group of US officials would face off with a group of Iraqi officials of same or similar rank (President v. President, Vice President v. Vice President, etc.). Ramadan proposed that the duel be held in a neutral land, with each party using the same weapons, and with UN Secretary General Kofi Annan presiding as the supervisor. On behalf of President Bush, White House Press Secretary Ari Fleischer declined the offer.
- In 2002, British mechanic Leon Humphreys attempted to challenge a £25 fine issued by the Driver and Vehicle Licencing Agency (DVLA) by invoking mediaeval precedent to a trial by combat, stating that: "The victor speaks in the name of God and justice so it is a reasonable enough way of sorting the matter out". However, his demand to a duel a champion nominated by the DVLA in a fight to the death armed with Samurai swords, Gurkha knives or heavy hammers was refused by magistrates.

== Duels in legend, mythology and religious text ==
Notable examples of single combat in legend, mythology and religious text:

- David vs. Goliath
- Heracles vs. Antaeus
- Menelaus vs. Paris
- Achilles vs. Hector
- Aeneas vs. Turnus
- Romulus vs. Acro, King of the Caeninenses
- Nennius of Britain vs. Julius Caesar
- Bhima vs. Duryodhana
- Gilgamesh vs. Enkidu
- Sinuhe vs. the hero of Redjenu

== Duels in fiction ==
- Eugene Onegin by Alexander Pushkin (who was himself killed in a duel). Other Pushkin's works featuring duels are The Captain's Daughter, Gunshot, Caucasian Romance, and The Stone Guest.
- Mikhail Lermontov's novel A Hero of Our Time has a duel scene thought prophetic of the duel which would bring about the author's death.
- Dune features two duels involving the protagonist Paul Atreides, the first against Jamis, and the second against and Feyd-Rautha.
- The novel The Princess Bride and its film adaptation feature several sword duels between Westley (Dread Pirate Roberts) and Inigo Montoya and between Inigo Montoya and Count Rugen.
- The Three Musketeers by Alexandre Dumas, père. D'Artagnan commits himself to fight three consecutive duels with Athos, Porthos, and Aramis.
- Cyrano de Bergerac by Edmond Rostand; Cyrano is famous for his dueling.
- The Years Between, four-book series by Paul Féval, fils; and M Lassez: – 1928 features the ongoing conflict between the fiery Cyrano de Bergerac and D'Artagnan the aging legend. Three times they fight; various interruptions prevent either Gascon from receiving satisfaction.
- Les Liaisons dangereuses by Pierre Choderlos de Laclos: Valmont versus Danceny, Valmont allows himself to be killed.
- Sentimental Education by Flaubert.
- The Duel (also known as The Point of Honor: A Military Tale) by Joseph Conrad: Two officers of Napoleon's army fight a number of duels over many years. The story was transferred to the screen in 1977 by Ridley Scott as The Duellists.
- The Duel, a philosophic novella by Anton Chekhov.
- War and Peace: Pierre and Dolokhov duel. Leo Tolstoy himself barely escaped duels with fellow writers Ivan Turgenev and Nikolay Nekrasov.
- Sense and Sensibility by Jane Austen has an "offstage" duel between Colonel Brandon and Mr. Willoughby over the seduction of Colonel Brandon's adopted daughter.
- Fathers and Sons: Kirsanov and Bazarov duel is a culminating point of the novel; Turgenev also wrote a short story called Duellist.
- Vladimir Nabokov's Ada, or Ardour.
- Radetzky March by Joseph Roth: Regimental doctor Max Demant is killed in a duel with Cavalry Captain (Rittmeister) Count Tattenbach after Tattenbach implies that Dr. Demant's best friend, Lieutenant Carl Joseph von Trotta, is having an affair with Demant's wife and spews antisemitic insults at Demant.
- HMS Surprise by Patrick O'Brian; Stephen Maturin fights and kills Richard Canning over Diana Villiers.
- In Tombstone, Doc Holliday stands in for his friend Wyatt Earp in a duel with Johnny Ringo. This is based on one of several explanations for the unusual circumstances surrounding Ringo's death.
- Libertine, a Baroque-style music video by Mylène Farmer starts with a duel between the singer and a man, ending in the man's death.
- The Skulls, a 2000 movie, culminates in a duel between the two main characters, though neither fires on the other and the fight is eventually interrupted by the father of one of the participants.
- Tender Is the Night by F. Scott Fitzgerald: McKisco vs Barban.
- Barry Lyndon, the 1975 movie by Stanley Kubrick includes many duels. It begins with a duel in which Barry's father is mortally shot by an unknown man. Years later Barry duels Captain Quin for Nora. The movie culminates in a duel with Barry's stepson, Lord Bullingdon. This last duel is not in the original novel The Luck of Barry Lyndon by William Makepeace Thackeray.
- Dark Shadows: in the 1795 storyline, Barnabas Collins had fought a duel against Jeremiah Collins in a duel after he learned he married his love Josette du Pres thanks to Angelique's spell, and the duel caused Jeremiah's death.
- In Star Wars, lightsaber duels between Jedis and Siths are a recurring theme. Examples includes Darth Vader versus Obi-Wan Kenobi in A New Hope and Revenge of the Sith, Vader versus Luke Skywalker in The Empire Strikes Back and Return of the Jedi, Darth Maul versus Qui-Gon Jinn and Kenobi in The Phantom Menace, Count Dooku versus Anakin Skywalker and Kenobi in Attack of the Clones and Revenge of the Sith, and Yoda versus Palpatine in Revenge of the Sith.
- Howard Waldrop's Fin de Cyclé culminates in a duel between Alfred Jarry and an antagonistic journalist, riding bicycles atop the Eiffel Tower.
- In the novel and the movie The Man with the Golden Gun, James Bond and Francisco Scaramanga duel with pistols at the film's climax.
- In the book Field of Dishonor in the Honor Harrington series, Honor Harrington fights and wins two pistol duels, first against Denver Sumervale, who previously killed her lover in a duel, and then against Pavel Young, who hired Sumervale. She also fights and wins a sword duel in Flag in Exile with Steadholder Burdette.

== See also ==
- List of people killed in duels
