= Chinese compound surname =

Chinese surname with multiple characters

A Chinese compound surname is a Chinese surname using more than one character. Many of these compound surnames derive from Zhou dynasty Chinese noble and official titles, professions, place names and other areas, to serve a purpose. Some are originally from various tribes that lived in ancient China, while others were created by joining two one-character family names. Only a few of these names (e.g. Ouyang [歐陽/欧阳], Shangguan [上官], Sima [司馬/司马], Zhuge [諸葛/诸葛], Situ [司徒], Xiahou [夏侯], Huangfu [皇甫], and Huyan [呼延]) can still be found quite commonly in modern times with Ouyang, Shangguan, Sima and Situ appearing most frequently. Many clans eventually took on a single-character surname for various reasons. Lists below are arranged alphabetically by their Mandarin pinyin spellings.

== Native Han compound surnames ==
Chinese characters	Meaning or origin	Mandarin (Pinyin)	Cantonese (Jyutping)	Hokkien (POJ)	Vietnamese	Korean	Japanese	Notable people
百里	Hundred li	Bǎilǐ	Baak^{3} Lei^{5}		Bách Lý	Baengni; Baengri (백리)	Hyakuri	Baili Xi
淳于	An ancient Chinese kingdom	Chúnyú	Seon^{4} Jyu^{1}		Thuần Vu	Sunu (순우)	Jun'u	Chunyu Qiong
第五	The fifth	Dìwǔ	Dai^{6} Ng^{5}		Đệ Ngũ	Jeo (제오)	Daigo	Diwu Qi
東方 (东方)	"East", descendants of Fuxi clan according to legend	Dōngfāng	Dung^{1} Fong^{1}		Đông Phương	Dongbang (동방)	Tōhō	Dongfang Shuo (東方朔)
東閣 (东阁)	"Eastern Pavilion"	Dōnggé	Dung^{1} Gok^{3}		Đông Các	Donggak (동각)	Tōkaku	
東郭 (东郭)	"Eastern Wall"	Dōngguō	Dung^{1} Gwok^{3}		Đông Quách	Donggwak (동곽)	Tōkaku	
東門 (东门)	"East Gate", place of residence, from Zhou dynasty	Dōngmén	Dung^{1} Mun^{4}		Đông Môn	Dongmun (동문)	Tōmon	
端木		Duānmù	Dyun^{1} Muk^{6}	Tuan-bo̍k	Đoan Mộc	Danmok (단목)	Tanboku	Duanmu Ci (端木賜), San Duanmu
(公孙)		Gaotang		Kong-sun	Công Tôn			Gaotang Chen, Gaotang
公孫 (公孙)	"Dukes' descendants", an address of the noble descendants in the Spring and Autumn period	Gōngsūn	Gung^{1} Syun^{1}	Kong-sun	Công Tôn	Gongson (공손)	Kōson	Gongsun Zan, Gongsun Long
公羊	Branch of Gongsun	Gōngyáng	Gung^{1} Joeng^{4}	Kong-iông	Công Dương	Gongyang (공양)	Kōyō	Gongyang Gao (公羊高)
公冶	Branch of Ji, from courtesy name of Jiye (季冶) of Lu in the Eastern Zhou dynasty	Gōngyě	Gung^{1} Je^{5}		Công Dã	Gong-ya (공야)	Kōya	Gongye Chang (公冶長)
公西		Gōngxī	Gung^{1} Sai^{1}		Công Tây	Gongseo (공서)	Kōsai	Gongxi Chi (公西赤)
毌丘	Place name	Guànqiū	Kwun^{3} Jau^{1}		Quán Khâu	Gwan-gu (관구)	Kankyū	Guanqiu Jian
穀梁 (谷梁)	Sorghum grains (?)	Gǔliáng	Guk^{1} Loeng^{4}		Cốc Lương	Gongnyang; Gongryang (곡량)	Kokuryō	
皇甫	Branch of Zi (子), from 皇父, the courtesy name of Huangfu Chongshi (皇父充石) of the Duchy of Song in the Eastern Zhou dynasty	Huángfǔ	Wong^{4} Pou^{2}	Hông-hú	Hoàng Phủ	Hwangbo (황보)	Kōfu	Huangfu Song, Huangfu Ran (皇甫冉)
黄斯		Huangsi			Hoàng Tư			
蘭向(兰向)		Lanxiang			Lan Hướng			
令狐	Place name	Línghú	Ling^{6} Wu^{4}	Lîng-hô·	Lệnh Hồ	Yeongho; Ryeongho (령호)	Reiko	Linghu Chu
甪里	Place name	Lùlǐ	Luk^{6} Lei^{5}		Lộ Lý	Nongni; Rongri (록리)	Rokuri	
閭丘 (闾丘)	Place name	Lǘqiū	Leoi^{4} Jau^{1}		Lư Khâu	Yeogu; Ryeogu (려구)	Ryokyū	Luqiu Luwei (閭丘露薇)
南宮 (南宫)	Southern Palace	Nángōng	Naam^{4} Gung^{1}		Nam Cung	Namgung (남궁)	Nankyū	Nangong Kuo (Western Zhou)
歐陽 (欧阳)	South of Mt. Ou Yu	Ōuyáng	Au^{1}Joeng^{4}	Au-iông	Âu Dương	Guyang (구양)	Ōyō	Ouyang Xiu, Jimmy O. Yang
上官	High official (place name)	Shàngguān	Soeng^{6} Gun^{1}	Siōng-koan	Thượng Quan	Sanggwan (상관)	Shōkan	Empress Shangguan, Shangguan Wan'er, Shangguan Yunxiang
申屠	"butcher from Shen"	Shēntú	San^{1} Tou^{4}		Thân Đồ	Sindo (신도)	Shinto	Shentu Jian (申屠建)
司馬 (司马)	"Master of the Horse" or "Marshal", one of the Three Excellencies from the Han dynasty	Sīmǎ	Si^{1} Maa^{5}	Su-má	Tư Mã	Sama (사마)	Shiba	Sima Qian, emperors of the Jin dynasty
司徒	"Minister over the Masses", one of the Three Excellencies from the Han dynasty	Sītú	Si^{1} Tou^{4} (SooHoo in Toisan)	Su-tô·	Tư Đồ	Sado (사도)	Shito	Szeto Wah, Sitoh Yih Pin
司空	"Minister of Works", one of the Three Excellencies from the Han dynasty	Sīkōng	Si^{1} Hung^{1}		Tư Không	Sagong (사공)	Shikū	Sikong Ting (司空頲)
司寇	"Minister of Justice"	Sīkòu	Si^{1} Kau^{3}		Tư Khấu	Sagu (사구)	Shikō	
太史	"Grand Historian", an imperial official title	Tàishǐ	Taai^{3} Si^{2}		Thái Sử	Taesa (태사)	Taishi	Taishi Ci
澹臺 (澹台)		Tántái	Taam^{4} Toi^{4}		Đam Đài	Damdae (담대)	Tantai	Tantai Mieming
聞人 (闻人)	"famous person", descendants of Shaozheng Mao (少正卯)	Wénrén	Man^{4} Jan^{4}		Văn Nhân	Munin (문인)	Bunjin	
巫馬 (巫马)	"Horse"	Wūmǎ	Ng^{5} Maa^{5}		Vu Mã	Uma (우마))	Goba	Wuma Shi (巫馬施)
夏侯	"Marquess Xia", from noble title granted to the descendants of Yu the Great by Duke of Lu in the Spring and Autumn period	Xiàhóu	Haa^{6} Hau^{6}	Hā-hô͘	Hạ Hầu	Hahu (하후)	Kakō	Xiahou Ying, Xiahou Dun
鮮于 (鲜于)		Xiānyú	Sin^{1} Jyu^{1}		Tiên Vu	Seonu (선우)	Sen'u	Xianyu Zhongtong (鮮于仲通)
西門 (西门)	"West Gate", place of residence, from Marquessate of Zheng in the Spring and Autumn period	Xīmén	Sai^{1} Mun^{4}		Tây Môn	Seomun (서문)	Saimon	Ximen Bao
軒轅 (轩辕)	The (personal) name of the Yellow Emperor	Xuānyuán	Hin^{1} Jyun^{4}	Hian-oàn	Hiên Viên	Heonwon (헌원)	Ken'en	Yellow Emperor
楊子 (杨子)	A branch of 楊 (Yang)	Yángzǐ	Joeng^{4} Zi^{2}		Dương Tử	Yangja (양자)	Yōshi	
樂正 (乐正)	Minister of music	Yuèzhèng	Ngok^{6} Zing^{3}		Nhạc Chính	Akjeong (악정)	Gakusei	
鍾離 (钟离)	A country in Chunqiu	Zhōnglí	Zung^{1} Lei^{4}		Chung Ly	Jongni; Jongri (종리)	Shōri	Zhongli Mu (鐘離牧), Zhongli Mo
諸葛 (诸葛)	A branch of 葛 (Ge)	Zhūgě	Zyu^{1} Got^{3}	Chu-kat	Gia Cát (Chư Cát)	Jegal (제갈)	Shokatsu	Jegal Je-min; Zhuge Liang
祝融	God of Fire	Zhùróng	Zuk^{1} Jung^{4}		Chúc Dung	Chugyung (축융)	Shukuyū	Lady Zhurong
子車 (子车)		Zǐjū	Zi^{2} Geoi^{1}		Tử Xa	Jageo (자거)	Shikyo	
左人	Left-handed man	Zuǒrén	Zo^{2} Jan^{4}		Tả Nhân	Jwa-in (좌인)	Sajin	

== Double-barrelled surnames ==
Double-barrelled surname (雙姓) occurs sometimes when both families of a marriage wish to pass down their surnames, or when a child wishes to commemorate both the biological and foster parents. This is often distinguished from compound surnames (複姓), which cannot be split into two single-character surnames. A doubled-barrelled surname is also distinguished from a married name (冠夫姓), as married names are not passed down to the next generations.

Chinese Characters	Mandarin (Pinyin)	Cantonese (Jyutping)	Hokkien (POJ)	Vietnamese	Korean	Japanese	Notable People
范姜	Fànjiāng		Hoān-khiong	Phạm Khương			Fan Chiang Tai-chi
陸費 (陆费)	Lùfèi (Lùbì)	Luk^{6} Fai^{3}		Lục Phí	Yugbi; Ryugbi (륙비)	Rikuhi	Lufei Kui
葉劉 (叶刘)	Yèliú		Ia̍p-lâu	Diệp Lưu			Regina Ip
張簡 (张简)	Zhāngjiǎn		Tiuⁿ-kán	Trương Giản			Louis Ozawa Changchien
張廖 (张廖)	Zhāngliào		Tiuⁿ-liāu	Trương Liêu			Chang Liao Wan-chein (Taiwanese politician)
鄭張尚芳 (郑张尚芳)	Zhèngzhāng						Zhengzhang Shangfang

== Non-Han surnames ==
Peoples other than Han have resided in China and have their names transliterated into Chinese. A large number of these non-Han surnames contain more than one Chinese character.

Chinese Characters	Meaning/Origin	Origin	Mandarin (Pinyin)	Cantonese (Jyutping)	Hokkien (POJ)	Vietnamese	Korean	Japanese	Notable People
阿史那	Wolf (cf. Asena)	Possibly Turkic	Āshǐnà	Aa^{3} Si^{2} Naa^{5}		A Sử Na	Asana (아사나)	Ashina	Empress Ashina
愛新覺羅 (爱新觉罗)	Gold	Manchu	Àixīnjuéluó (Aisin Gioro)	Oi^{3} San^{1} Gok^{3} Lo^{4}	Ài-sin-kak-lô	Ái Tân Giác La	Aesin-gangna; Aesin-gangra (애신각라)	Aishinkakura	Qing rulers
孛兒只斤 (孛儿只斤)	Dark blue eyes	Mongol	Bó'érzhījīn (Borjigin)	But^{6} Ji^{4} Zi^{2} Gan^{1}		Bột Nhi Chỉ Cân (Bát Nhĩ Tế Cát Đặc)	Barajigeun (발아지근)	Botsujishikin	Genghis Khan
獨孤 (独孤)		Xianbei	Dúgū	Duk^{6} Gu^{1}		Độc Cô	Dokgo (독고)	Dokko/Dokuko	Dugu Qieluo
爾朱 (尔朱)		Xiongnu	Erzhu	Ji^{5} Zyu^{1}		Nhĩ Chu	Iju (이주)	Jishu	Erzhu Rong, Erzhu Zhao
賀蘭 (贺兰)	Helan Mountains	Xianbei	Hèlán	Ho^{6} Laan^{4}		Hạ Lan	Haran (하란)	Garan	Princess Dowager Helan
赫連 (赫连)		Xiongnu	Hèlián	Haak^{1} Lin^{4}		Hách Liên	Hyeongnyeon; Hyeongryeon (혁련)	Kakuren	Helian Bobo
賀若 (贺若)		Xianbei	Hèruò	Ho^{6} Joek^{6}		Hạ Nhược	Hayak (하약)	Kajaku	Heruo Bi (賀若弼)
赫舍里	Water spring	Manchu	Hèsheli	Haak^{1} Se^{2} Lei^{5}		Hách Xá Lý	Hyeoksari (혁사리)	Kakushari	Hešeri Sonin, Empress Xiaochengren, Songgotu
万俟		Xianbei	Mòqí	Mak^{6} Kei^{4}		Mặc Kỳ	Mukgi (묵기)	Bokuji	Moqi Chounu (万俟醜奴)
慕容		Xianbei	Mùróng	Mou^{6} Jung^{4}	Bō·-iông	Mộ Dung	Moyong (모용)	Boyū	Murong Huang
納蘭 (纳兰)	Variant of 叶赫那拉 (Yehenala)	Manchu	Nàlán	Naap^{6} Laan^{4}		Nạp Lan	Namnan; Namran (납란)	Nōran	Nalan Xingde
星團 (星团)	Band/group/cluster of stars		Xīngtuán	Sing^{1} Tyun^{4}			Shindan (신단)	Seidan	
呼延		Xiongnu	Hūyán	Fu^{1} Jin^{4}		Hô Diên	Hoyeon (호연)	Koen	Empress Huyan, Huyan Zan
沙吒		Göktürk	Shāzhā	Saa^{1} Zaa^{1}		Sa Tra	Sata (사타)	Sata	Shazha Zhongyi (沙吒忠義)
拓跋		Xianbei	Tuòbá	Tok^{3} Bat^{6}		Thác Bạt	Takbal (탁발)	Takubatsu	Emperors of Northern Wei, formerly surname of Tangut rulers, Western Xia
完顏 (完颜)		Jurchen	Wányán	Jyun^{4} Ngaan^{4}		Hoàn Nhan	Wanan (완안)	Kangan	Wanyan Aguda
耶律		Khitan	Yēlǜ	Ye^{4} Leut^{6}		Da Luật (Gia Luật)	Yayul (야율)	Yaritsu/Jaritsu	Emperors of Liao dynasty, Yelü Chucai
尉遲 (尉迟)		Xianbei or Khotan	Yùchí	Wat^{1} Ci^{4}		Uất Trì (Úy Trì)	Ulji (울지)	Utchi/Utsuchi	Yuchi Jingde, Yuchi Jiong
宇文		Xianbei	Yǔwén	Jyu^{5} Man^{4}		Vũ Văn	Umun (우문)	Ubun	Yuwen Tai, emperors of Northern Zhou
長孫 (长孙)	Eldest grandson	Xianbei	Zhǎngsūn	Zoeng^{2} Syun^{1}		Trưởng Tôn	Jangson (장손)	Chōson	Zhangsun Wuji, Empress Zhangsun (wife of Emperor Taizong of Tang)
山口	Gateway/opening of the mountain	Japanese	Shānkǒu	San^{1} Hau^{2}	Soaⁿ-kháu	Sơn Khẩu	Sangu (산구)	Yamaguchi	Yoshiko Yamaguchi (Shānkǒu Shūzǐ)
川島	River on the island	Japanese	Chuāndǎo	Cyun^{1} Dou^{2}	Chhoan-tó	Đảo Xuyên	Cheondo (천도)	Kawashima	Yoshiko Kawashima (Chuāndǎo Fāngzi)
伊達	Elegance	Japanese	Yīdá	Ji^{1} Daat^{6}	I-ta̍t	Y Đạt	Idal (이달)	Date	Date Junnosuke (Yīdá Shùnzhīzhù)

== See also ==
- Chinese surname
- Japanese surname
- Korean surname
- Vietnamese name
