= Situ (surname) =

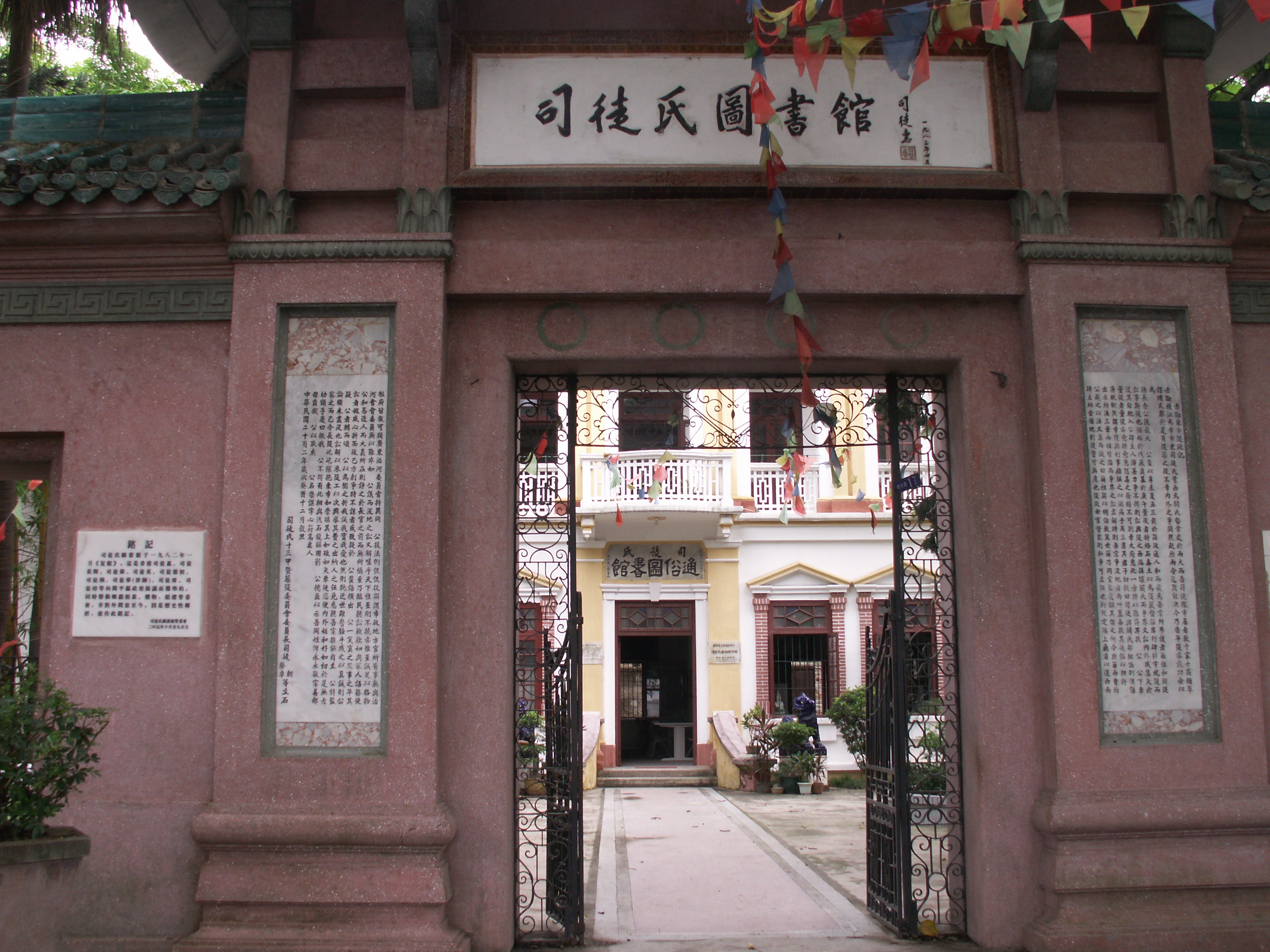
- The door of the Situ Clan Library in Chikan, Kaiping, Guangdong province
- Chinese: 司徒
- Hanyu Pinyin: Sītú
- Wade–Giles: Ssŭ^{1}t‘u^{2}
- Yale Romanization: Sītòuh
- Jyutping: Si1tou4

Situ (司徒) is one of the more common surviving Chinese compound surnames. It is also spelled in Wade–Giles as Ssŭtu or in the Mathews system as Szŭtu, and romanised from Cantonese as Szeto, Seeto, Seto, Szetu or Sitou, or from Taishanese as Soohoo or Soho. It originates from the ancient Chinese title Situ, which can be translated as "Minister over the Masses". The surname is common in Guangdong province, particularly around Kaiping. Almost eighty per cent of people with this surname live in Kaiping.

== Statistics ==
According to data from the Sixth National Population Census of the People's Republic of China in 2010, Situ was China's fourth-most common compound surname, behind Ouyang, Shangguan, and Huangfu. The census found roughly 45,000 bearers of the surname. However, it is not among the top 400 surnames overall in China.

The following table presents statistics for more common spellings of this surname in the United States, according to the United States Census. The Hanyu Pinyin spelling Situ became more common between 2000 and 2010, while Szeto, Seto, and Soohoo remained at roughly the same rankings during that time period. Other spellings such as Ssutu, Szutu, Sitou, and Seetoo occurred fewer than 100 times in census data. Some of these spellings may also correspond to non-Chinese surnames; for example, Seto is also a Japanese surname (written in kanji as 瀬戸).

Spelling	2010 United States census			2000 United States census			References
Spelling	Rank	Number of people	% Asian	Rank	Number of people	% Asian	References
Situ	#11512	2,732	97.66%	#17449	1,490	94.50%	
Szeto	#12012	2,599	97.66%	#11827	2,426	93.98%	
Seto	#11229	2,814	75.52%	#11444	2,526	79.65%	
Soohoo	#18910	1,444	88.85%	#18447	1,382	89.15%	

== People ==
People with this surname include:

- Situ Qiao (司徒喬; 1902–1958), Chinese oil painter
- Situ Huimin (司徒慧敏; 1910–1987), Chinese film director
- Situ Guong (司徒光; 1911–?), Chinese Olympic long jumper
- Sha Fei (birth name Situ Chuan 司徒传; 1912–1950), Chinese war photographer
- Szeto Wai (司徒惠; 1913–1991), Hong Kong engineer and architect
- Szeto Wah (司徒華; 1931–2011), Hong Kong politician
- Dixon Seeto (司徒新耀; 1951–2019), Fijian businessman
- Da-Hong Seetoo (司徒達宏; born 1960), Chinese-born American recording engineer and violinist
- KF Seetoh (司徒国辉; born 1962), Singaporean food critic
- Sitoh Yih Pin (司徒宇斌; born 1963), Singaporean politician
- Jessica Soho (born 1964), Filipino journalist and television presenter
- Antony Szeto (司徒永華; born 1964), Australian director, martial artist, actor, stunt coordinator
- Szeto Kam-Yuen (司徒錦源; 1964–2012), Hong Kong screenwriter
- Andy Seto (司徒劍僑; born 1969), Hong Kong comic artist
- Carwai Seto (司徒加慧; born 1973), Canadian swimmer who represented Taiwan at the 1988 Summer Olympics
- Szeto Man Chun (司徒文俊; born 1975), Hong Kong football manager
- Hayden Szeto (司徒頌曦; born 1985), Canadian television actor
- Nikki SooHoo (司徒少英; born 1988), American television actress
- Brandon Soo Hoo (born 1995), American television actor
- Karen Seto (司徒靜儀), American geographer
- Anne-Valérie Seto (司徒安妮), Professional Canadian soccer player
