= Napoléon (miniseries) =

2002 historical miniseries

- Created by: Didier Decoin and Max Gallo, Yves Simoneau
- Directed by: Yves Simoneau
- Starring: Christian Clavier; John Malkovich; Isabella Rossellini; Gérard Depardieu; Julian Sands
- Countries of origin: France; Canada
- Original languages: French; English
- No. of episodes: 4

Production
- Running time: 360 minutes

Original release
- Network: France 2
- Release: October 14, 2002 – 2002

Napoleon is a 2002 historical miniseries which explores the life of Napoleon Bonaparte, portrayed by Christian Clavier. It was the most expensive television miniseries in Europe up to that time, costing an equivalent of US$46,330,000 to produce. The miniseries covered Napoleon's military successes and failures, including the battles of Austerlitz, Eylau, and Waterloo and the retreat from Russia. It also delved into Napoleon's personal life: his marriage to and divorce from Josephine de Beauharnais, his marriage to Marie Louise, the Duchess of Parma and daughter of Francis II, and his affairs with Eleanore Denuelle and Marie Walewska. The series draws from Max Gallo's biography.

The miniseries was produced by GMT Productions in France and co-produced by Transfilm in Canada, A&E Networks in the US, and Spice Factory in the UK. In France it first aired October 7, 2002 on France 2, in Quebec it ran from February 2 to February 23, 2003, on Super Écran and was then re-aired on Télévision de Radio-Canada. In the United States, it aired from April 7 to April 8, 2003, on the Arts and Entertainment (A&E) channel. The series received mixed to positive reviews, with praise for Clavier's portrayal of Napoleon and the battle scenes and realism.

== Plot ==
In 1818, Napoleon is imprisoned on Saint Helena. Via flashback, Napoleon's life unfolds, with his first meeting the widow Josephine de Beauharnais, and follows his career breakthrough, the suppression of Royalist rioters on 13 Vendémiaire (1795). He takes part in the Battle of Arcole, 1796. The couple inspect their future house, Château de Malmaison, and Napoleon allies with Talleyrand and Fouché. Napoleon conducts the French campaign in Egypt and Syria, 1798–1801, the Coup of 18 Brumaire, and avoids the Plot of the rue Saint-Nicaise, 1800.

In 1804, Napoleon oversees the controversial arrest and execution of the duc d'Enghien, followed by the elevation of members of the House of Bonaparte, and Napoleon's imperial coronation. He takes part in the Battle of Austerlitz, 1805, followed by the Battle of Jena-Auerstedt, 1806. Napoleon has an affair with Maria Walewska, as troubles converge with his wife. In the Battle of Eylau, 1807, Napoleon waits desperately for the reinforcements led by Marshal Michel Ney who makes the timely arrival. Napoleon then concludes a short-lived peace treaty with Alexander at Tilsit as the costly Peninsular War starts and troubles with his family and imperial succession begin to dominate. He experiences a defeat at the Battle of Aspern-Essling, 1809, and he marries the Duchess of Parma in 1810 who gives birth to a son in 1811. Napoleon, feeling provoked by the Russians, invades in 1812 and watches from the Kremlin as Moscow ignites.

Napoleon makes the bitter retreat from Russia. Sensing France's weakness, the War of the Sixth Coalition erupts in 1813, and, outnumbered, Napoleon's forces are reduced and Paris is taken in 1814. After attempting suicide, and being forced to abdicate, he becomes the sovereign of Elba. Escaping from Elba, Napoleon encounters the 5th Regiment and Ney and convinces them over to his side, even reconciliation with Ney. The Hundred Days culminates with the Battle of Waterloo, 1815, and the defeat of the imperial forces. Napoleon is exiled to the island of Saint Helena, where his only friend and confidante is a young English girl to whom he relates the story of his life. He dies in 1821.

== Cast ==
- Christian Clavier as Napoléon Bonaparte
- Isabella Rossellini as Joséphine de Beauharnais
- Gérard Depardieu as Joseph Fouché
- John Malkovich as Charles Maurice de Talleyrand-Périgord
- Anouk Aimée as Letizia Bonaparte
- Heino Ferch as Armand Augustin Louis de Caulaincourt
- Sebastian Koch as Marshal Jean Lannes
- Ennio Fantastichini as Joseph Bonaparte
- Yves Jacques as Lucien Bonaparte
- Alexandra Maria Lara as Countess Marie Walewska
- Toby Stephens as Alexander I of Russia
- Mavie Hörbiger as Marie Louise of Austria
- Marie Bäumer as Caroline Bonaparte
- Claudio Amendola as Marshal Joachim Murat
- Julian Sands as Klemens von Metternich
- Ludivine Sagnier as Hortense de Beauharnais
- John Wood as Pope Pius VII
- Natacha Amal as Madame Bertrand
- Charlotte Valandrey as Madame Coigny
- Florence Pernel as Thérésa Tallien
- Jessica Paré as Eléanore Denuelle
- Tamsin Egerton-Dick as Lucia Elizabeth "Miss Betsy" Balcombe
- David La Haye as Louis-Antoine-Henri de Bourbon-Condé, duc d'Enghien
- David Francis as Sir Hudson Lowe
- Jacky Nercessian as Roustam Raza
- Guillaume Depardieu as Jean-Baptiste Muiron
- Alain Doutey as Marshal Michel Ney
- Serge Dupire as Pierre Cambronne
- Philippe Volter as Paul Barras
- Vincent Grass as Charles IV of Spain
- Jean Dell as Malmaison's player

== Production ==
Filming took place in Austria, Canada, the Czech Republic, France, Hungary, Morocco and Switzerland. The filmmakers found that many locations in Hungary resembled 19th century France. However, matte paintings and various digital effects were also employed in post-production in order to recreate the historical setting. In many of the battle sequences, computer-generated soldiers created by Hybride Technologies were added into the footage. The fact that Napoleon left behind many historical records helped in the production, and other records were supplied by the modern-day French Army.

== Historical accuracy ==
- During the Plot of the Rue Saint-Nicaise, Napoleon is seen travelling alongside his wife; in reality Joséphine was riding in a separate carriage.
- Napoleon and Tsar Alexander are shown in 1808 at the Congress of Erfurt listening to a performance of Nicolo Paganini's Caprice No. 24. In reality the piece was composed in 1817.
- The dressing down of Talleyrand during which Napoleon claimed that he was "shit in a silk stocking" occurred in front of Napoleon's marshals rather than in private chambers. By this time, Talleyrand had also already resigned his office, rather than being fired.
- Talleyrand warns King Louis XVIII that Napoleon and his army are advancing on Paris. In reality, Talleyrand was at the Congress of Vienna at the time.
- Murat is seen offering his services to Napoleon once more for the upcoming Waterloo campaign, but in real life, Murat had actually done so through a dispatch and not in person, as the last time the two actually saw each other was in Germany in 1813 following Napoleon's defeat at the Battle of Leipzig.
- Cambronne is seen saying the infamous word of Cambronne and later a variation of his famous response about the Guard during the Battle of Waterloo. The accuracy of these words is disputed, though they are popularly attributed to him.

== Reception ==
The series premiered at a time when many other books and films about Napoleon had recently come out or were in production, including a stage production called C'était Bonaparte, which opened days before the miniseries premiered. Upon its release, it was the first television series to be broadcast simultaneously in all the participating European countries. However, when originally broadcast in the United States, it was edited down to a running time of three hours, as opposed to the original six hours.

When it first aired in France it drew in on average more than seven million nightly viewers, which represented a share over 30% of all the TV viewers on those nights. Critical reviews have been mixed, with an average rating of 75% on Rotten Tomatoes. Some reviewers were uneasy at the casting of Christian Clavier, an actor known mostly for his work in comedy films, in the title role. French critics generally found Clavier to be "a good Napoleon but a poor Bonaparte." That is, striking an imposing figure but failing to give insight into the man. In terms of the dispute over whether Napoleon was a visionary, a tyrant, or an imposter, historian Jean Tulard considers the miniseries to be "too soft" on the emperor. However, the series also endows him with some unsavory characteristics, including a certain insensitivity towards the human costs of war. Clavier himself referred to the character he portrays as an intellectual and a true liberal.

Anthony Nield of DVD Times criticized the series's pacing. John Lichfield of the Independent found the battle scenes inconsistent in terms of realism. Neil Strauss of the New York Times stated that the series "shows how one lofty aim can lead to another. And sadly, the timely case is made that bloodshed has easily and often led to more bloodshed. The voice-over narration describes Napoleon as initially just an obscure Corsican, and after his early victories he wants nothing more than to become a mathematician. But in his life, as in his televised story, big-picture thinking is prone to gross miscalculations." One reviewer praised the performances of Clavier and Malkovich and the sets and costumes. Reviewing the DVD release,myReviewer.com noted that "...on the whole Napoleon does not disappoint. The big scale feel of an epic production is there and some of the acting is first class." Ann Hodges also praised Clavier's performance and the visuals but was critical of the supporting cast. C.W. Nevius offered a negative review. Michael Speier praised the series attention to detail and the performances. One reviewer called it a "limp disappointment".

In a 2023 article, in light of the release of the 2023 titular film of the same name, Juilo Bardini compared the miniseries favourably, stating that "it still remains one interpretation of the historical facts".

=== Controversy ===
The series was praised in France, but received negative reviews in Italy. Italian politician, Umberto Bossi, was angered by the series, stating that it glamorized Napoleon despite the fact that his occupation of Italy resulted in the deaths of hundreds of thousands and the looting of many of the country's artistic treasures. He also criticized Italy's RAI television network for co-funding the series. Producer and cast member Gérard Depardieu defended the series, stating that it keeps to the truth and that "perhaps Bossi would have preferred an idiot Napoleon." Two other members of the cast, Clavier and Rossellini, vouched for the integrity of their respective portrayals of the French emperor and empress. Lichfield, on the other hand, says that the series omits most of the unsavory elements of Napoleon's Italian campaign.

=== Awards ===
In 2003, the series won a Bavarian TV award. In France, it won a 7 d'Or award for Best Director. In the United States, it was nominated for nine Emmy awards, and it won the Emmy for Outstanding Costumes for a Miniseries, Movie or a Special

== DVD release ==
A three-disc DVD (4:3 full screen) recording, under the A&E label and with A&E extra features, is sold in the United States. In Canada, there is a four-disc DVD (1:78:1 widescreen) recording, under the REMSTAR label and without the A&E extra features, in both English and French editions. French edition is also in 1:78:1 (16:9) widescreen.

== Video game ==
A Risk-style video game based on the miniseries, titled Napoleon, was released on November 14, 2002 by Atari and Infogrames for Mac and Windows. The game allows players to recreate some of Napoleon's historical battles. Richard Grégoire, the composer of the soundtrack of the miniseries, also contributed a part of the game's music.

== See also ==
- Cultural depictions of Napoleon
