= Yoshi (disambiguation) =

Yoshi is a green dinosaur and Mario's steed in the Mario franchise.

Yoshi may also refer to:

== People ==
=== Given name ===
- Yoshi Katō (1913–1988), Japanese actor
- Yoshi Sodeoka, American artist and musician
- Yoshi Sudarso (born 1989), American actor, model and stuntman
- Yoshi Tatsu (born 1977), ring name of Japanese pro-wrestler Naofumi Yamamoto
- Yoshi Wada (1943–2021), Japanese-American musician

=== Nickname ===
- Y. Misdaq, aka Yoshi, British musician and multimedia artist
- Hitomi Yoshizawa (born 1985), nicknamed Yoshi or Yossie, Japanese idol, Morning Musume member
- Naoki Yoshida (born 1973), aka Yoshi-P, Japanese video game producer, director and designer working for Square-Enix
- Tyson Yoshi, real name Ben Cheng Tsun Yin (born 1994), Hong Kong independent singer, songwriter, and MV director.

=== Surname ===
- Ikuzo Yoshi (born 1952), Japanese singer

== Fictional characters ==
- Hamato Yoshi, in the Teenage Mutant Ninja Turtles universe
- Yoshi (Bleach), in the Bleach anime series
- Yoshi, in The Adventures of Dr. McNinja
- Yoshi, a polar bear from the live-action film Dolittle
- Yosshii, in the anime series Don't Toy with Me, Miss Nagatoro spelt Yoshi in the dubbed version
- Yoshino Fujieda, in the anime series Digimon Data Squad who is nicknamed "Yoshi" in the dub
- Yoshitaka Mine, the main antagonist of Yakuza 3
- Yoshikage Kira, the main antagonist of Diamond is Unbreakable, the 4th part of JoJo's Bizarre Adventure

== Other uses ==
- Yoshi (crater), a small lunar crater
- Yoshi (mammal), a prehistoric genus of sabertooth cats
- Yoshi (video game series), a spin-off of the Mario series
  - Yoshi (video game), the first game in the series
- "Yoshi", song by Arcángel from Sentimiento, Elegancia y Más Maldad, 2023
- Yoshi's, two jazz clubs, in Oakland and San Francisco, California

== See also ==
- Yoshii (disambiguation)
- Yuchi (surname)
