= Charles Leon =

Charles Leon may refer to:

- Charles Léon (1806–1881), acknowledged illegitimate son of Emperor Napoleon I of France and Louise Catherine Eléonore Denuelle de la Plaigne
- Charles Leon (activist), Aboriginal Australian activist, co-founder and president of the Aboriginal-Australian Fellowship
- Charles León Tamayo, Cuban gymnast
