= Shangguan =

Shangguan is the atonal pinyin romanization of various Chinese words and names, and may refer to:

- Shangguan (surname), a Chinese compound surname
- Shangguan, Dali (上关镇, Shàngguān zhèn), a town in Dali, Yunnan, China
- Shangguan, Dongyuan County (上莞镇, Shàngguǎn zhèn), a town in Dongyuan County, Heyuan, Guangdong, China
- Shangguan, Shanxi (上馆镇, Shǎngguǎnzhèn), a town in Shanxi, China
- Shangguan News, website of the Shanghai-based Jiefang Daily newspaper
