= Yuchi (disambiguation) =

The Yuchi are a Native American tribe.

Yuchi may also refer to:

- Yuchi language, language of the Yuchi people
- Yuchi (surname), Chinese compound surname of Xianbei origin
- Yuchi, Nantou, rural township in Taiwan
- Yūchi Station, railway station in Wakkanai, Hokkaidō, Japan
