= Yehliu (disambiguation) =

Yehliu most often refers to:

== Place ==
- Yehliu, a cape in Wanli District, New Taipei, Taiwan

== Surname ==
- Yehliu (surname), one of the compound surnames of Hakka people in Taiwan

Yehliu may also refer to:

== Person ==
- Regina Ip, a political figure of Hong Kong
