= Taishi (surname) =

- Taishi in regular script
- Pronunciation: Tàishǐ (Pinyin)
- Language: Chinese

Origin
- Language: Chinese language
- Origin: name of an office in imperial China
- Meaning: grand historian

Other names
- Variant form: Taishi (Mandarin)

Taishi ([tʰâɪʂɻ̩̀], Chinese: 太史; pinyin: Tàishǐ; Wade–Giles: T'ai^{⁴}-shih^{³}) is a Chinese compound surname. Taishi literally means Grand Historian, a high official in ancient imperial China. For example, Sima Qian was the Grand Historian in Han dynasty.

Taishi is not included in the Hundred Family Surnames book and is no longer used to this day.

== Notable people named Taishi ==
- Taishi Ci, military general of Eastern Wu
