= Yoshii =

Yoshii (Japanese: 吉井) may refer to:

== Places ==
- Yoshii, Fukuoka, a former town in Fukuoka Prefecture
- Yoshii, Gunma, a former town in Gunma Prefecture
- Yoshii, Nagasaki, a former town in Nagasaki Prefecture
- Yoshii, Okayama (Akaiwa) (吉井町), a former town in Akaiwa District, Okayama Prefecture
- Yoshii, Okayama (Shitsuki) (芳井町), a former town in Shitsuki District, Okayama Prefecture

== Other uses ==
- Yoshii (surname)
