= Kawashima =

Kawashima (written: 川島, 川嶋, pronounced [kaɰaɕima]) is a Japanese surname. Notable people with the surname include:

- Ai Kawashima (川嶋 あい; born 1986), musician
- Aimi Kawashima (川島 亜依美; born 1990), Japanese volleyball player
- Akira Kawashima (川島 明; born 1979), Japanese comedian, television personality and actor
- Chiyoko Kawashima (川島 千代子; born 1954), voice actress
- Eiji Kawashima (川島 永嗣; born 1983), association football goalkeeper
- Eiko Kawashima (川島 栄子, born 1961), singer/songwriter
- Hiroshi Kawashima (川島 郭志; born 1970), boxer
- Justin Kawashima (born 1970), Japanese–American music producer
- Katsushige Kawashima (川嶋勝重; born 1974), boxer
- Kiko, Princess Akishino, née Kawashima (川嶋紀子, born 1966)
- Keiko Kawashima (川島慶子; born 1959), Japanese historian of science
- Kozo Kawashima (川島弘三; born 1926), ski jumper
- Motohiro Kawashima (川島 基宏), video game composer
- Naniwa Kawashima (川島浪速; 1865–1949), spy
- Naomi Kawashima (川島 なお美; 1960–2015), actress
- Reiji Kawashima (川島 零士; born 1995), voice actor
- Ryuta Kawashima (川島 隆太; born 1959), neuroscientist
- Tokuyoshi Kawashima (川島 得愛; born 1973), voice actor
- Umika Kawashima (川島 海荷; born 1994), singer and actress
- Yasunaru Kawashima, cardiothoracic surgeon who pioneered the Kawashima procedure
- Yoshiko Kawashima (川島 芳子; 1907–1948) Manchu royalty and spy
- Yoshiyuki Kawashima (川島 義之; 1878–1945), a general in the Imperial Japanese Army and Minister of the Army in the 1930s
- Yukiko Kawashima (川島 有紀子; born 1996), Japanese ice hockey player
- Yuzo Kawashima (川島雄三; 1918–1963), filmmaker

== Fictional characters ==
- Ami Kawashima (川嶋 亜美), a main character from Toradora!
- Sapphire Kawashima (川島 緑輝), a main character from Hibike! Euphonium
- Urara Kawashima (川島 麗), side character from Food Wars!

== See also ==
- Kawashima, Gifu
- Kawashima, Tokushima
