= Ouyang =

Ōuyáng
- Language: Chinese

Origin
- Language: Chinese language
- Origin: Geographical place names
- Derivation: Mount Ouyu (now Mount Sheng) and Yang riverbank

Ouyang

Chinese name
- Traditional Chinese: 歐陽
- Simplified Chinese: 欧阳
Transcriptions
Standard Mandarin
- Hanyu Pinyin: Ōuyáng
- Bopomofo: ㄡㄧㄤˊ
- Wade–Giles: Ou^{1}-yang^{2}
- IPA: [óʊ.jǎŋ]
Hakka
- Romanization: euˊ iongˇ
- Pha̍k-fa-sṳ: Êu-yòng
Yue: Cantonese
- Yale Romanization: āu yèuhng
- Jyutping: au1 joeng4
- IPA: [ɐw˥.jœŋ˩]
Southern Min
- Hokkien POJ: Au-iông

Vietnamese name
- Vietnamese: Âu Dương
- Chữ Hán: 歐陽

Korean name
- Hangul: 구양
- Hanja: 歐陽
Transcriptions
- Revised Romanization: Guyang

Japanese name
- Kanji: 欧陽
- Hiragana: おうよう
Transcriptions
- Romanization: Ōyō

Ouyang (Traditional Chinese: 歐陽) is a Chinese surname. It is the most common two-character Chinese compound surname, being the only two-character name of the 400 most common Chinese surnames, according to a 2013 study.

== Romanisations ==
- Sinitic languages: Ouyang, Oyang, O Yang, O'Yang, Owyang, Au Yong, Auyong, Ah Yong, Auyang, Auyeung, Au Yeung, Au Yeang, Au Yeong, Au Ieong, Ao Ieong, Eoyang, Oyong, O'Young, Auwjong, Ojong, Owyong, Ou Young, Ow Yeong, Ow Young
- Vietnamese: An-dương, Âu-dương (Northern), Âu-giương (Central), Âu-dzương (Southern), Âu-rương, Âu-lương, Âu-lang, Âu-giang

== History ==
The Song dynasty historian Ouyang Xiu traced the Ouyang surname to Ti (蹄, pinyin: Tí), a prince of Yue, the second son of King Wujiang (無疆). After his state was extinguished by the state of Chu, Ti and his family lived in the south side of the Mount Ouyu (歐余山, currently called Mount Sheng 升山 in Huzhou, Zhejiang). In Classical Chinese, the south side of a mountain or the north bank of a river is called Yang (陽), thus the Ti family was called Ouyang. He was called Marquis of Ouyang Village (歐陽亭侯). Traditionally, Ti's ancestry can be traced through his father Wujiang, the King of Yue, to the semi-legendary Yu the Great (大禹).

According to a 2013 study, Ouyang was the 169th most common name in China, being shared by around 910000 people or 0.068% of the total population, with the province with the most people with the name being Hunan.

=== Geographical origins ===
In terms of distribution Ouyangs have mostly been confined to southern China, especially the areas of southern Jiangxi, central Hubei and eastern Henan, with smaller pockets in Guangdong, Sichuan, Hunan and Guangxi.

=== Notable clans ===
The most prominent of the Ouyang clans historically was undoubtedly that of Yongfeng in Jiangxi, which produced a number of scholars who reached prominence in the imperial bureaucracy. Genealogical lineages and family trees have been established for a number of Ouyang clans around China, showing migration patterns from the Song to the Qing dynasty.

In Vietnam, this clan was often shortcut as Âu (歐) or Dương/Giàng (陽).

== Notable people ==
=== Arts and entertainment ===
- Catalina Ouyang, American artist
- Stephen Oyoung, Chinese-American actor
- Jimmy O. Yang, born Au-yeung Man-sing, Chinese-American stand-up comedian and actor
- MC Jin, born Jin Au Yeung, hip-hop artist
- Ouyang Feiying, 1930s Shanghai singer
- Ouyang Feifei, Taiwanese-Japanese singer
- Ouyang Nana, Taiwanese musician, singer and actress
- Ouyang Didi, Taiwanese singer and member of girl group Gen1es
- Bobby Au-yeung, Hong Kong actor
- Susanna Au-yeung, Hong Kong actress and acupuncturist

=== Scholars, scripters, authors ===
- Ouyang Xiu, Song dynasty scholar
- Ouyang Xun, Tang dynasty scholar
- Ouyang Zhan, Tang dynasty scholar
- Ouyang Yibing, Chinese film scripter
- Pearl Au Yeung, Hong Kong Children's book author-illustrator

=== Sports ===
- Âu Dương Quân, Vietnamese footballer of JMG Academy
- Âu Dương Thanh, former Vietnamese footballer of Customs F.C.
- Au-yeong Pak Kuan, Singaporean footballer
- Au Yeong Wai Yhann, Singaporean squash player
- Daniel Au Yeong, Austrian-Dutch footballer
- Au Yeung Yiu Chung, Hong Kong footballer
- Andrew Aw Yong Rei, Singaporean footballer
- Darryl O'Young, Canadian-born Hong Kong racing driver

=== Government ===
- Ean Yong Hian Wah, Malaysian politician
- Ean Yong Tin Sin, Malaysian politician
- Elsie Ao Ieong, Macau Secretary for Social Affairs and Culture
- Mieke Oeyang, U.S. Deputy Assistant Secretary of Defense for Cyber Policy

=== Other ===
- Myra Sidharta, born Auwjong Tjhoen Moy, Indonesian historian
- Petrus Kanisius Ojong, born Auwjong Peng Koen, co-founder of Indonesian newspaper Kompas
- Ouyang Xiadan, CCTV News reporter
- Ouyang Ziyuan, Chinese cosmochemist and geochemist, chief scientist in charge of the Chinese Lunar Exploration Program
- Francis Ouyang, Chief of Hospital Medicine VA Medical Center, United States.

== See also ==
- Chinese compound surname
- Văn Lang
- Âu Lạc
