= Yuchi (surname) =

Yuchi (simplified Chinese: 尉迟; traditional Chinese: 尉遲; pinyin: Yùchí; Wade–Giles: Yü^{4}ch'ih^{2}) is a Chinese compound surname which originated from Xianbei and Khotan. The royal family name of the Kingdom of Khotan Viśa was translated as Yuchi. There is no consensus on whether the two Yuchi are related.

The well known military general Yuchi Gong was descended from the Xianbei Yuchi.

Yuchi is the 419th surname in Hundred Family Surnames. Since compound surnames are not common in China, some descendants of Yuchi might have changed their name to single surname Yu (尉) or Chi (遲).

== Notable Yuchi ==
=== Xianbei ===
- Yuchi Chifan, concubine of Emperor Xuan of Northern Zhou
- Yuchi Gong, military general in Tang Dynasty
- Yuchi Jiong, general of Western Wei and Northern Zhou

=== Khotan ===
- Yuchi Sengwubo, king of Khotan
- Yuchi Yiseng, painter from the Kingdom of Khotan

== See also ==
- Yoshi (disambiguation)
- Yoshii (surname)
