= Count von Racowitza =

Wallachian nobleman (1843–1865)

Prince Iancu Racoviță (1843–1865) was a nobleman from Wallachia. He participated in a notable duel on 28 August, 1864 against Ferdinand Lassalle. He had come from Romania to Berlin in 1856, where he studied philosophy and law at Berlin university. He became a member of a German Student Corps there.

== Life ==
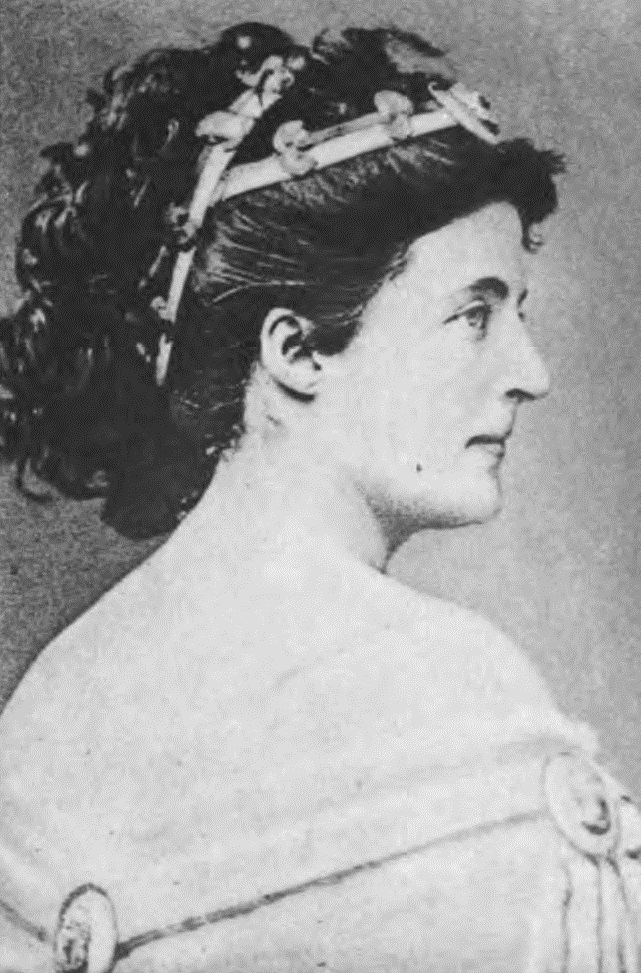
Helene von Racowitza

A diplomat in Bavarian service, Wilhelm von Dönniges (d. 1872), father of Helene von Dönniges (1846–1911) intended the prince to marry his daughter. She preferred a Social Democratic leader of the Labour movement, Ferdinand Lassalle, known for his independence from persons such as Karl Marx.

When her father heard of their plans to marry, he locked her in a room and arranged an engagement with Prince Iancu Racoviță. Lassalle challenged Helene's father. When the Prince heard of this, he took over Lassalle's challenge, a common duelling procedure, when an older man was challenged by a younger man. Lassalle had little experience in the use of pistols and only one day to prepare. Racoviță, despite also being inexperienced, spent the previous afternoon intensely training. Racoviță shot Lassalle in the abdomen, and Lassale's return shot missed. Lassale spent 3 days heavily drugged with opium before dying on 31 August, 1864.

Following the duel, Racoviţă fell ill and died a few months after Helene von Dönniges married him. She married a second time to an actor named Siegwart Friedmann and became an actress herself. This marriage ended in divorce in 1873. Together with her third husband, editor of the New Yorker Volkszeitung, Sergei Shevitch, she moved to America, returning to Europe in 1890. Four days after his death on 27 September, 1911, she took her own life.
