= Huangfu Ran =

Chinese poet

- Chinese: 皇甫冉
Transcriptions
Standard Mandarin
- Hanyu Pinyin: Huángfǔ Rǎn
- Wade–Giles: Huang^{2}-fu^{3} Jan^{3}

Courtesy name: Maozheng
- Chinese: 茂政
Transcriptions
Standard Mandarin
- Hanyu Pinyin: Màozhèng
- Wade–Giles: Mao^{4}-chêng^{4}

Huangfu Ran (714? – 767?) was a Chinese poet of the mid-Tang dynasty. His courtesy name was Maozheng.

== Biography ==
=== Birth and early life ===
Huangfu was born around 714. (Note: Benn (2015, p. 106) says 714 and Britannica says "714?", while the Research Centre for Translation (2004, p. 121) says "717?".) He was a native of Anding (modern-day Jingchuan County, Gansu Province). According to the New Book of Tang, Huangfu was able to compose literature by the age of ten, impressing Zhang Jiuling, who was the chancellor under Emperor Xuanzong at the time. (Note: 皇甫冉，字茂政，十歲便能屬文，張九齡歎異之。與弟曾皆善詩。天寶中，踵登進士，授無錫尉。王縉為河南元帥，表掌書記。遷累右補闕，卒。)

Huangfu was the older brother of Huangfu Zeng.

=== Political career ===
Huangfu left government after attaining the post of Zuo Bujue (左補闕).

=== Death ===
Huangfu died around 767. (Note: Benn (2015, p. 106) says 767 and Britannica says "767?", while the Research Centre for Translation (2004, p. 121) says "770?".)

== Names ==
Huangfu's courtesy name was Maozheng.

== Poetry ==
In literary history, Huangfu is generally considered a poet of the so-called mid-Tang period, which spanned the late-eighth to early-ninth century.

There is an anthology of his poetry, called Tang Huangfu Ran Shiji (唐皇甫冉詩集).

== Works cited ==
- Benn, James A. (2015). Tea in China: A Religious and Cultural History. Hong Kong: Hong Kong University Press. ISBN 978-988-8208-73-9.
- "Huangfu Ran (Kōho Zen in Japanese)". Britannica Kokusai Dai-Hyakkajiten (in Japanese). Encyclopædia Britannica, Inc. 2014.
- Research Centre for Translation, ed. (2004). Renditions. Hong Kong: Chinese University of Hong Kong.
