= Rudkin-Philpot duel =

The Rudkin-Philpot duel, fought in 1826, was the last recorded duel to the death in Newfoundland.

== Background ==
The duel took place between Captain Mark Rudkin, a British Army veteran, and Ensign John Philpot of the Royal Veteran Companies.

Rudkin was born in Ireland, the son of William Rudkin, Esq., of County Carlow. He was a veteran of the British Army who served in the Peninsular War in the Low Countries and in North America. He was made an ensign in 1805, and was a lieutenant by 1811, when he was wounded in the Battle of Fuentes de Oñoro, part of Wellington's Peninsula Campaign. He was taken as a prisoner of war in 1813 in actions following the Battle of Vitoria. Rudkin was promoted to full captain of his company on 3 March 1815. He was later stationed at St. John's, Newfoundland.

Less has been written about John Philpot, who was described as "an Englishman." Folklore holds that both Rudkin and Philpot were adversaries for some time, vying for the affections of one woman, a daughter of a prominent citizen of St. John's who lived at Quidi Vidi. On one occasion, during a social function, Philpot insulted Rudkin but later apologized.

On 29 March 1826, officers of the Royal Veteran Companies gathered at the quarters of Captain Matthew Henry Willock for a party and a game of lanscolet. A dispute arose over a pot of £2 8s 6d, leading to an argument during which Philpot threw water at Rudkin. When repeated attempts to resolve the conflict peacefully failed, Rudkin challenged Philpot to a duel.

== Duel ==
In the early afternoon of March 30, 1826, the duelists proceeded to a site about a mile from St. John's at West's Farm near Brine's Tavern. The spot chosen for the duel was Robinson's Hill, located to the east of Rennie's Mill, possibly the site of what would later become the Feildian Grounds.

Rudkin's second was Dr. James Coulter Strachan (1794 - 1827), assistant surgeon of the Royal Veteran Company, while Captain George Farquhar Morice (of HMS Grasshopper) acted as Philpot's second. On multiple occasions, the seconds encouraged Philpot to apologize, but he refused.

Wallis and Banks pistols were used in the duel. Philpot was considered a good shot, but Rudkin was an expert marksman. Wishing to avoid a death, the seconds set the distance upon which the men would fire five paces further apart than the usual twelve paces.

Dr. Strachan gave the signal to fire. Philpot's shot missed its intended target, grazing Rudkin's collar; Rudkin fired aimlessly into the air in the hope that the disagreement would be settled amicably. Philpot refused again to apologize, and a second round was prepared.

Morice gave the signal to fire the second time, and both men fired instantly. Philpot fell. Morice and Dr. Strachan turned Philpot over and found that the pistol ball had entered his right side under his arm, between the fifth and sixth rib. Dr. Strachan pronounced the wound as mortal and said Philpot was dying. Cavendish Willock, a bystander, placed his coat over Philpot's corpse.

Rudkin, agitated, ran to Fort Townshend and reported the incident to his commanding officer.

== Aftermath ==
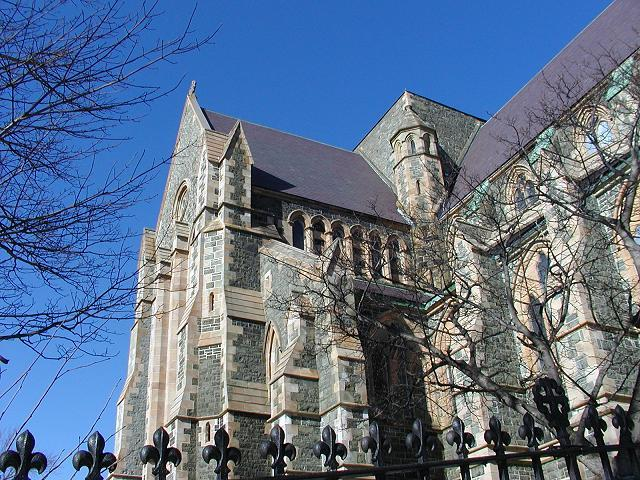
Anglican Cathedral of St. John the Baptist, St. John's, Newfoundland and Labrador, site of Philpot's burial.

Philpot was buried in the Church of England churchyard on Church Hill in St. John's:

The funeral of the dead duelist was one of the largest ever seen in the town. Shop-keepers put up their shutters, residents lowered their blinds, minutes guns were fired from Fort William, and business generally was suspended while the mournful procession moved through the different streets.

Rudkin, Strachan, and Morice were arrested and held in the Signal Hill jail. The matter was brought to trial on 17 April 1826, with Chief Justice Richard Alexander Tucker presiding. It was the first court case held in the newly-reformed Supreme Court, which had opened on 2 January 1826 with John William Molloy and Augustus Wallet DesBarres as assistant judges.

Rudkin was charged with murder in the first degree, while Strachan and Morice were charged as accessories in the second degree. At the conclusion of the trial, the Chief Justice addressed the jury, giving his personal estimation of the Laws of England, and stating that there was no Law of Honour in the British court system.

The jury returned with a verdict of Guilty — but without malice. The justice, "advised the court that, if the jury was satisfied that no malice existed, it would have either to bring in a verdict of manslaughter, or acquit the men altogether. It took only twenty minutes to decide on the latter." The verdict "gave evident satisfaction to an extremely crowded Court, and was received by the multitude with repeated cheers."

Following the trial, Rudkin was met with "a tumultuous reception" from a crowd waiting on the street outside. Not much is known about Rudkin's life following the trial. In 1840 he was called as a witness in a court trial in Dublin. He was placed on half pay in May, 1828, and died, unmarried, 15 December 1869, at Blackrock, Dublin.

The pistols used in the duel, formerly in the private collection of Joseph R. Smallwood, are now held by The Rooms in St. John's.
