= Ouyang Zhan =

Chinese scholar

Ouyang Zhan (Chinese: 歐陽詹; 758–801; courtesy name Xingzhou 行周) was a Chinese poet and politician of the late Tang dynasty. The account of his death from grief for a deceased lover gained great popularity in ninth-century China.

== Life ==
Ouyang was born in Panhu village (潘湖), Chidian (池店), Jinjiang, Fujian. His family had resided for several generations in the southeast and included magistrates and assistants in Quanzhou who came to service without examination.

Ouyang Zhan completed the jinshi degree in 792, alongside Han Yu and many other notable scholars in the year that came to known as the “list of tigers and dragons” (龍虎榜). Han Yu claimed that Ouyang Zhan was the first scholar of national standing to emerge from the southeast, a claim repeated by Wang Dingbao, but there were at least three degreeholders in the early eighth century from the Southeast.

Ouyang became assistant lecturer at the College of the Four Gates at the Imperial Academy in 799 and held it until his death.

Ouyang became an ardent participant in Han Yu's Classical Prose Movement. His writings have been compiled in ten volumes (歐陽行周文集). His poetry appears in a section of the compilation Complete Tang Poems.

== Death ==
Ouyang fell in love with a courtesan from Taiyuan. When his official duties forced him to leave her, he promised to return.However, she was unable to muster the patience required and died of loneliness. When Ouyang heard the news, he too died of grief. This story was recounted in Meng Jian's (孟簡; jinshi 791) "Recounting Ouyang Xingzhou’s Affairs" (述歐陽行周事), a work about Ouyang's relationship with the courtesan that led to both of their deaths. In addition, Han Yu's elegy for Ouyang (歐陽生哀辭) became a famous historical homage.

== Legacy ==
Ouyang Zhan had three sons and is the first ancestor of all the majority of Ouyang surnames in Jinjiang.
