= Charles Hesse =

Prussian-born British officer (c. 1791 – 1832)

Charles Hesse (c. 1791 – 24 February 1832) was a Prussian-born officer of the British Army, notable for his liaison with the young Princess Charlotte of Wales.

== Biography ==
He was the son of a Prussian merchant who made a fortune from various enterprises including supplying clothes to the Russian Army. His education took place under the guidance of the Margrave of Brandenburg-Ansbach, who was resident in England. After completing his education he returned to Berlin, where he was expected to inherit his father's fortune. However, the Prussian defeat in the War of the Fourth Coalition ruined his father, as the King of Prussia was unable to pay him for the clothes supplied to the Prussian Army. Hesse was sent back to England and taken under the protection of the now-widowed Margravine of Brandenburg-Ansbach. The Duchess of York, who had been born a princess of Prussia, also interested herself on her countryman's behalf, and in December 1808, at the age of seventeen, Hesse was given a commission as cornet in the 18th Light Dragoons by the Duke of York, Commander-in-Chief of the Forces. His promotion to lieutenant was purchased in May 1809.

Hesse was good-looking, attractive, and a good horseman, and was soon received in society. However, his good fortune led to rumours about his parentage which Hesse did nothing to dispel. Lady Blessington says that Hesse was presumed to be a son of the Margrave and Margravine of Brandenburg-Ansbach born before their marriage, while Captain Gronow says that Hesse was generally believed to have been fathered by the Duke of York. Either way, Lady Blessington comments that "the calibre of his mind could not be better proved, than by his preferring to have it believed that he was the illegitimate child of persons of high rank, rather than the legitimate son of a respectable banker at Berlin". When Hesse was posted with his regiment to Bognor, in his vanity he sought to attract the attention of Princess Charlotte of Wales, only daughter of the Prince Regent, who was staying there. Several letters were exchanged between the couple through Margaret Mercer Elphinstone, though General Garth also delivered some letters under the impression they were from Charlotte's mother, the Princess of Wales, who was estranged from the Regent.

Hesse served in the Peninsular War between February 1813 and April 1814, and was present at all the actions where the 18th Light Dragoons were engaged, including Morales on 2 June 1813, Vitoria on 21 June, where he was severely wounded in the wrist, Nivelle on 10 November 1813, Nive in December, Orthez on 27 February 1814, Croix d'Orade on 8 April, and Toulouse on 10 April. In late 1813 negotiations began for Princess Charlotte's marriage to the Hereditary Prince of Orange, and Hesse was requested to return her letters and a portrait, which had been sent out and delivered personally to him by Lord Wellington after the Battle of Vitoria. Hesse was initially reluctant to part with them but eventually relented. Lady Blessington states the letters and portrait were recovered by the Margravine of Brandenburg-Ansbach's son, Keppel Craven, at the instigation of Princess Charlotte herself, while Gronow says Hesse surrendered them to Admiral Lord Keith at the request of the Regent. The letters were still in the possession of the Comtesse de Flahaut (Keith's daughter) in 1845.

On Hesse's return from Spain, he was received back into favour by the Margravine of Brandernburg-Ansbach and stayed with the Duchess of York at Oatlands, but the Regent refused to receive him at Carlton House. In August 1814 the Princess of Wales left England for a tour on the Continent, and Hesse accompanied her as equerry. He travelled in her suite as far as Naples, and remained there when the Princess travelled on to Rome in March 1815. On 18 June 1815 Hesse was present with the 18th Light Dragoons at the Battle of Waterloo, where he was wounded; he was consequently awarded the Waterloo Medal. On 22 February 1816 he was promoted (without purchase) to be captain of a troop of the Cavalry Staff Corps, and he retired on half-pay on 25 February 1819. On 17 January 1825 he married Mary Elizabeth, daughter of Thomas Chambre of Nottingham Place.

Captain Gronow describes his friend Hesse's life as "full of singular incidents", and mentions an occasion when his overly close friendship with the Queen of Naples had caused him to be deported from the country. He was also a noted duellist. In 1832, following a dispute over a game of cards, Hesse fought a duel in the Bois de Vincennes with Count Léon, an illegitimate son of Napoleon Bonaparte. Hesse fired first, without waiting, and Léon's return shot wounded Hesse in the chest.

Charles Hesse died at Nogent-sur-Marne on 24 February 1832.
