= Eléonore Denuelle de La Plaigne =

Mistress of Emperor Napoleon I (1787–1868)

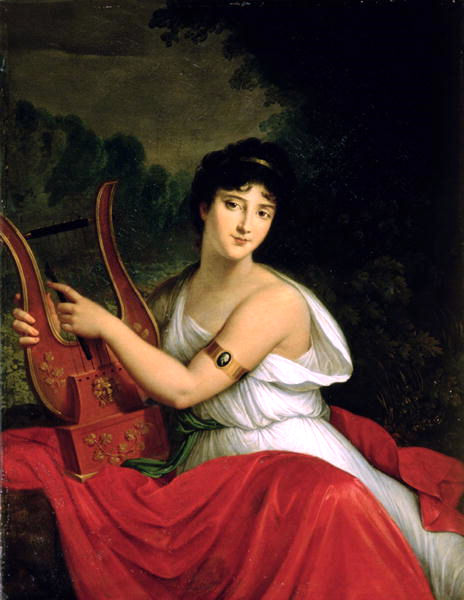
- Born: Louise Catherine Eléonore Denuelle de la Plaigne; 13 October 1787
- Died: 11 December 1868 (aged 81)
- Spouse(s): Jean-François Revel-Honoré (1805-div:1806); Pierre-Philippe Augier de La Sauzaye (1808-1814); Charles-Emile-Auguste-Louis de Luxbourg (1814-1849)
- Partner(s): Napoleon I Bonaparte (1806–1808); 1 child
- Children: Charles, Count Léon

Louise Catherine Eléonore Denuelle de la Plaigne (13 September 1787 – 30 January 1868) was a mistress of Emperor Napoleon I of France and the mother of his son Charles, Count Léon.

== Life ==
She was born Louise Catherine Eléonore Denuelle de la Plaigne into a middle-class family. By reports of the day she was pretty and witty. She was married at the age of 18 to a former army captain, Jean-François Revel-Honoré. Her husband was arrested for fraud three months into the marriage, and sentenced to two years in prison. On 29 April 1806, the couple were granted a divorce.

She had already become mistress to the Emperor Napoleon, an arrangement set up by his sister Caroline Bonaparte; on 13 December, their illegitimate son, Count Léon, was born. He was Napoleon's first child: proof that Napoleon was capable of producing an heir; also that his wife Joséphine de Beauharnais was infertile. As a result, he later divorced Joséphine and married Marie Louise of Austria.

Napoleon, who was then in Poland, refused to see Eleonore again. Instead, he arranged her 1808 marriage to a young lieutenant, Pierre-Philippe Augier de La Sauzaye. She was given a hefty dowry by the emperor, and the newly married couple departed for Spain. Augier was listed as missing in action on 28 November 1812 during Napoleon's Russian Campaign. Newly widowed, she married Count Charles-Emile-Auguste-Louis de Luxbourg in 1814. She remained with her third husband until his death 35 years later.

== Gallery ==
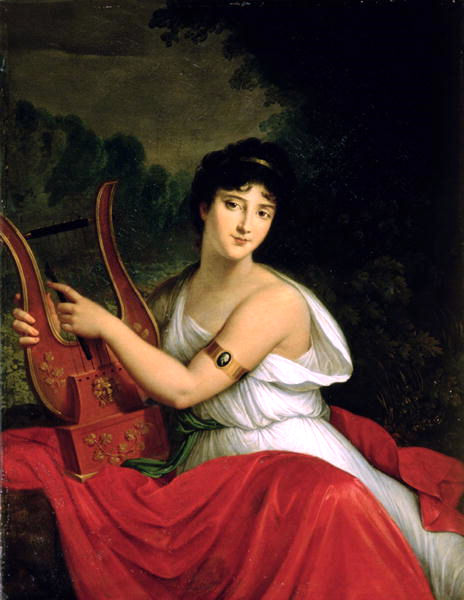
Eléonore Denuelle de La Plaigne by François Gérard, c. 1807

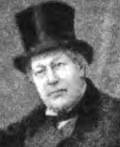
Charles, Count Léon
