= Women Gladiators (Ribera) =

1636 painting by Jusepe de Ribera

- Combate de Mujeres (Spanish)
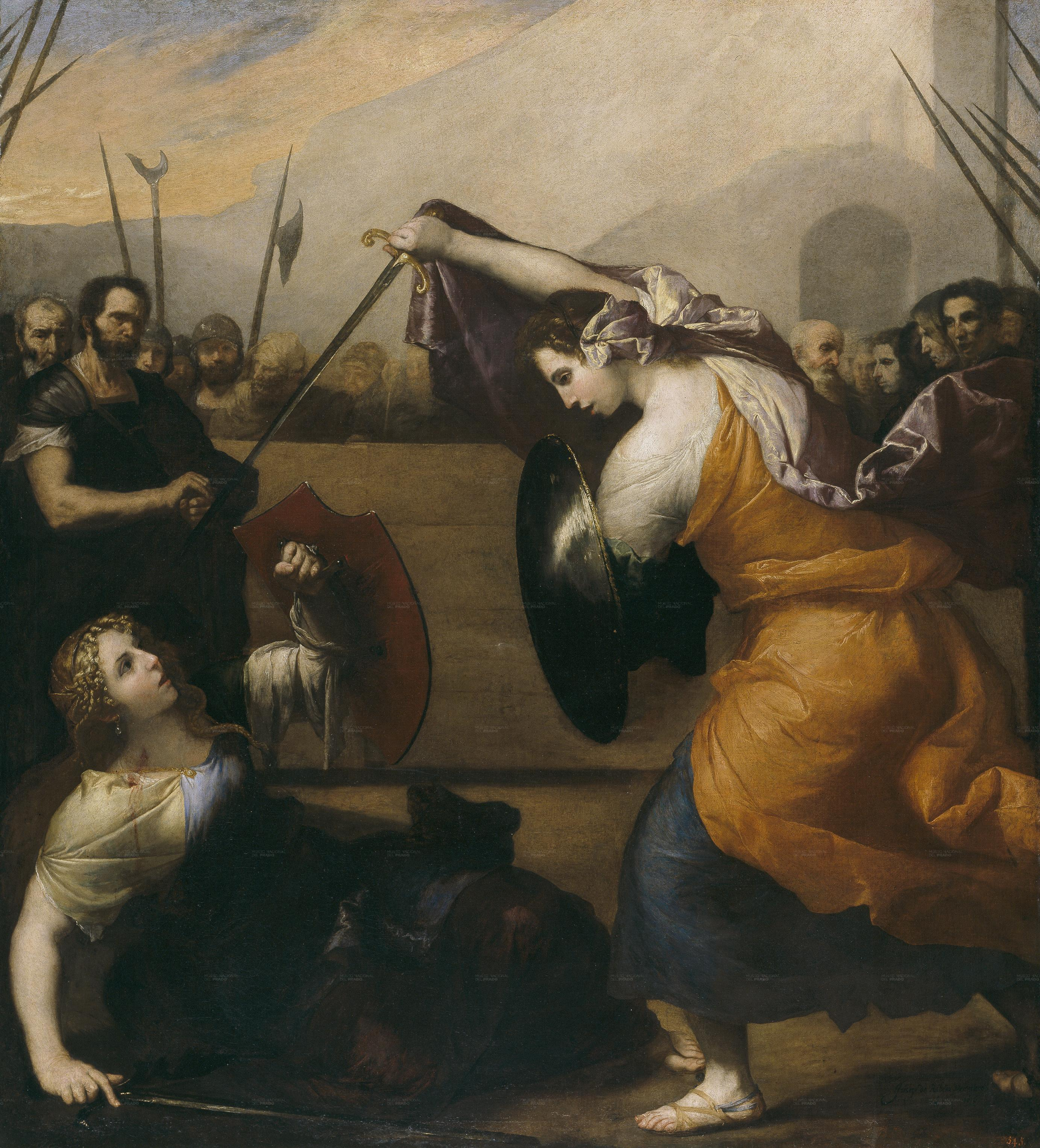
- Artist: Jusepe de Ribera
- Year: 1636
- Type: Oil on canvas
- Dimensions: 235 cm × 212 cm (93 in × 83 in)
- Location: Museo del Prado, Madrid

Women Gladiators (Spanish: Combate de Mujeres) is a painting by Jusepe de Ribera made in oil on canvas. It is conserved in the Museo del Prado, Madrid.

== Description ==
The painting, dated and signed, was made in Naples in 1636, as part of a series of over thirty pictures on the history of Rome commissioned to Giovanni Lanfranco, Domenichino, Ribera himself, and other artists.

== Analysis ==
The painting depicts a legendary episode occurred at Naples in 1552. Two women, Isabella of Carazzi and Diambra of Pottinella, in the presence of the Marquis del Vasto dispute in a duel for the love of a man called Fabio Zeresola. The subject matter of the painting has also been held to be an allegory of the fight between Vice and Virtue.
