= Justin Kawashima =

American sound editor, music producer, and arranger

- Born: November 18, 1970 (age 55); Japan
- Occupations: Sound editor, Music producer, Arranger

Justin Kawashima (born November 18, 1970), is a film sound editor, music producer, and arranger.

Kawashima was born in Japan, but his family moved to the United States that same year. He grew up in Houston, Texas, graduating from Memorial High School. He attended New York University and majored in Music History. Kawashima was accepted into the BMI Lehman Engel Musical Theater Workshop, making him the youngest person to join the group until Robert Lopez (who later won a Tony Award for writing Avenue Q) took that honor.

He has been a sound designer for films including Hal Hartley's feature, The Girl From Monday, starring Bill Sage and Sabrina Lloyd; and Opera No 1, featuring Parker Posey and James Urbaniak. He designed sound for Japanese film legend Takeshi Kitano's production company, Office Kitano, on the feature Big River, and the short film Running Time, starring Yul Vazquez, and Sam Rockwell.

In the dance world, he has collaborated as composer and sound designer on several new works with Bessie-Award-winning and Tony nominated choreographer David Neumann including Pearl River and the Central Park SummerStage concert performance featuring beat-poet John Giorno. Commissioned for the Celebrate Brooklyn Festival, Deep Six extended the collaboration to include veteran New York musicians Gary Seligson on drums and Dave Philips on bass.

As a musician, Kawashima has been a producer and an arranger for major label and independent artists including American Idol's Nikki McKibbin, and several other projects for multi-platinum mixer Andy Zulla. He provided additional production and mastering on the soundtrack, Possible Music, a collection of songs from the films of Hal Hartley. As an instrumentalist, Kawashima has performed with former Chucklehead MC Eben Levy in the electro-funk band Ejectrode, and was guitarist and keyboardist with the Pulitzer Prize-winning musical Rent, performing with the National Touring Production and on Broadway. He currently resides in Pleasanton, California as a Designer at Apple, with his wife, Lisa Walter, and their three daughters, Adrienne, Cameron and Deirdre.
