= Yoshii (surname) =

Yoshii (written: 吉井) is a Japanese surname. Notable people with the surname include:

- Hidekatsu Yoshii (吉井 英勝; born 1942), Japanese politician
- Hirotaka Yoshii (吉井 裕鷹; born 1998), Japanese basketballer
- Yoshii Isamu (吉井 勇; 1886–1960), Japanese poet and playwright
- Kanae Yoshii (吉井 香奈恵; born 1993), Japanese idol, singer and actress
- Kazuya Yoshii (吉井 和哉; born 1966), Japanese musician
- Kosuke Yoshii (吉井 孝輔; born 1986), Japanese footballer
- Masato Yoshii (吉井 理人; born 1965), Japanese baseball player
- Naoto Yoshii (吉井 直人; born 1987), Japanese footballer
- Rei Yoshii (吉井 怜; born 1982), Japanese actress
- Sayuri Yoshii (吉井 小百合; born 1984), Japanese speed skater

== Fictional characters ==
- Rui Yoshii, minor character in the anime series Soaring Sky! Pretty Cure
