= Yehliu (surname) =

Compound surname of the Hakka people of Taiwan

Yehliu (simplified Chinese: 叶刘; traditional Chinese: 葉劉; pinyin: yè liú) is one of the compound surnames of Hakka people in Taiwan. The people with the surname Yehliu are primarily living in Taoyuan, Hsinchu, Miaoli, and Nantou areas.

According to the published 2018 census data by Department of Household Registration of Ministry of the Interior in Taiwan, 163 Taiwanese were identified with the last name of Yehliu.

== History ==
In Qing dynasty, Ding Liu, the 15th generation of the Liu family in Lufeng county of Guangdong province in China moved to Taiwan alone. Ding Liu settled down in Hsinchu County under the governance by Qing, and started worshipping the spirit tablets from the 12th through 14th generations of the Liu family. Later, Ding Liu met with Yang-Gong Yeh, who also lived in Hsinchu. Ding Liu was then adopted by Yang-Gong Yeh as his son. Therefore, Ding Liu's family name was added by "Yeh" and became Ding Yehliu.

Before Yang-Gong Yeh adopted Ding Liu, he had two sons and an adopted daughter, Yu-Mei Hsu. Both Yeh's sons died when they were young. Later, Ding Liu married Yu-Mei Hsu. According to the genealogy book of Yehliu's family, Yang-Gong Yeh and Ding Yehliu had an agreement that the first son used Yeh, and the latter sons used Liu as their surnames. However, Ding Yehliu and Yu-Mei Hsu only gave birth to one son so he kept using "Yehliu" as his surname. The son was named Shih-Ming Yehliu, the sixteen generation of Yehliu family.

Shih-Ming Yehliu married three times, and he had eight sons and four daughters. One of his sons was adopted by other family. The other seven sons then became the seven major branches of the current Yehliu family.

== See also ==
- Regina Ip, full name Regina Ip Lau Suk-yee, (葉劉淑儀; born 1950) unrelated Hong Kong politician who coincidentally also uses the surname "葉劉"
