= Shangguan (surname) =

Shangguan (Chinese: 上官) is a Chinese compound surname.

During the Warring States period, Zilan, a son of King Huai of Chu, settled in Shangguan. Zilan's descendants took the place name as their surname. Following Qin's wars of unification, the Shangguan family and others loyal to the state of Chu were forced to relocate. The surname is prominent in Gansu, around Tianshui. A second wave of migration after the Tang dynasty ended saw many members of the Shangguan family settle in Fujian.

Shangguan is listed 411th in the Hundred Family Surnames.

Notable people with the surname include:

- Grand Empress Dowager Shangguan (88–37 BC; personal name unknown), granddaughter of Shangguan Jie, wife of Emperor Zhao of Han
- Shangguan Jie (died 80 BC), Chinese official, grandfather of Grand Empress Dowager Shangguan
- Shangguan Jiqing (born 1963), Chinese politician
- Polly Shang-Kuan Ling-feng (born 1949), Taiwanese actress
- Shangguan Wan'er (664–710), Chinese politician and poet, granddaughter of Shangguan Yi
- Shangguan Yi (608–665), Chinese poet and politician, grandfather of Shangguan Wan'er
- Shangguan Yunzhu (1920–1968; stage name), Chinese actress
- Shangguan Yunxiang (1895–1969), Republic of China army general
- Shangguan Zhibiao (1912–1967), Republic of China soldier
