= Charles Léon =

Soldier and son of Napoleon Bonaparte

Charles Léon Denuelle de la Plaigne
- Count Léon
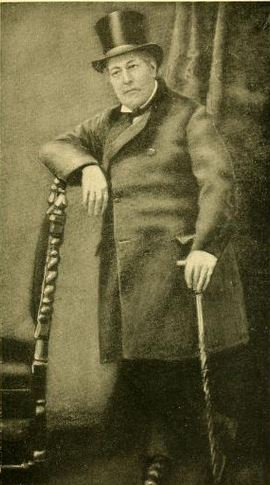
- Born: 13 December 1806; Paris, France
- Died: 14 April 1881 (aged 74); Pontoise, Paris, France
- Noble family: Bonaparte
- Spouse: Françoise Fanny Jouet
- Father: Napoleon Bonaparte
- Mother: Louise Catherine Eléonore Denuelle de la Plaigne

Charles Léon Denuelle de la Plaigne, 1st Count Léon (13 December 1806 – 14 April 1881) was an illegitimate son of Emperor Napoleon of France and his mistress Eléonore Denuelle de La Plaigne. Brought up in France, Léon began a military career in Saint-Denis, where he was head of a battalion of the national guard.

Admiring his father, he tried to keep the memory of the First Empire alive by organizing several commemorations. After the fall of his cousin Napoleon III and of the Second Empire, Léon retired to Pontoise and died in poverty.

== Biography ==
Charles Léon Denuelle de la Plaigne was born on 13 December 1806 at No. 29, Rue de la Victoire, 9th arrondissement of Paris, Paris, France, to Napoleon and Napoleon's sister Caroline Murat's maid, Louise Catherine Eléonore Denuelle de la Plaigne. Napoleon chose his second name of Léon. He was Napoleon's first son, but was entrusted to a tutor and initially brought up in ignorance of his heritage. Napoleon had thought for a long time that he was sterile because his wife Joséphine de Beauharnais, who already had two children from a previous marriage, failed to get pregnant. Léon's birth was of "undeniable political importance" since it showed that Napoleon was in fact not sterile. Napoleon considered adopting Léon, but realized his other illegitimate children would have claim to the crown and therefore abandoned the idea. Although he did not legitimize Léon, Napoleon acknowledged Léon as his son and gave him a pension of 25,000 francs a year and rights to the profits on wood sold from Moselle.

Léon – short for Napoleon – was raised away from the imperial court, but always under his father's protection. The Emperor made him an heir in his will, and gave him the title of Count.

In 1832, Léon shot an orderly of the Duke of Wellington's, Charles Hesse, in a duel over losing 16,000 francs to Hesse in a card game. The writer Gareth Glover stated Léon was "completely unmanageable" in adulthood and became a "hardened gambler", having to go to debtors' prison twice. The historian Andrew Roberts wrote he was an "argumentative drunken wastrel".

He married in Paris on 2 June 1862 Françoise Fanny Jouet (Brussels, 14 January 1831 – Vitz-sur-Authie, 12 May 1899), with whom he had four children who lived past infancy (sons Charles, Gaston and Fernand; and daughter Charlotte).

He died "poverty-stricken" in Pontoise on 14 April 1881. He is buried in a mass grave in Pontoise, Paris.

Léon’s daughter Charlotte Mesnard, who was interviewed in 1921 at the age of 55, said her father had a striking resemblance to Napoleon. She also said that two of Léon's sons and her own son were killed in action in the First World War. Comte Charles Léon, Léon's grandson, died in 1994.
