= Vietnamese name =

Traditional naming system in Vietnam

Vietnamese names (Vietnamese: họ tên) generally consist of two components including a surname followed by a given name:

- A surname most is a monosyllable and normally patrilineal, although matrilineality is possible.
- A composite given name consists of an optional padding name precedes a mandatory primary name:
  - Padding name: typically a monosyllable, although some individuals have more than one. Due to be placed at the "middle" of the full name, it is often mistakenly considered to serve the same role as a middle name in Western naming conventions.
  - Primary name: usually consists of one or two syllables as a double name.

However, not every name is conformant. For example:

Full name	Surname	Given name			Notes
Full name	Surname	Padding name		Primary name	Notes
Nguyễn Trãi	Nguyễn	none		Trãi	(Note: He does not have any padding name)
Phạm Bình Minh	Phạm	none		Bình Minh (lit. 'dawn')	(Note: Semantically he does not have any padding name, although Bình is often mistaken for one.)
Nguyễn Văn Quyết	Nguyễn	Văn		Quyết (lit. 'decide')	
Nguyễn Ngọc Trường Sơn	Nguyễn	Ngọc (lit. 'gemstone')		Trường Sơn (lit. 'long mountain')	
Tôn Thất Thuyết	Tôn Thất	none		Thuyết	(Note: Tôn Thất is a natural compound surname. He does not have any padding name. As almost every Vietnamese surname is monosyllablic, his surname is usually confused with Tôn, and Thất is often mistaken for a padding name.)
Lâm Thị Mỹ Dạ	Lâm	Thị		Mỹ Dạ (lit. 'beautiful night')	(Note: Spouses. Hoàng Phủ is a natural compound surname. As almost every Vietnamese surname is monosyllablic, it is usually confused with Hoàng, leading to their two daughters being mistakenly referred to as Hoàng Dạ Thi and Hoàng Dạ Thư instead of Hoàng Phủ Dạ Thi and Hoàng Phủ Dạ Thư.)
Hoàng Phủ Ngọc Tường	Hoàng Phủ	Ngọc		Tường (lit. 'deep understanding')	(Note: Spouses. Hoàng Phủ is a natural compound surname. As almost every Vietnamese surname is monosyllablic, it is usually confused with Hoàng, leading to their two daughters being mistakenly referred to as Hoàng Dạ Thi and Hoàng Dạ Thư instead of Hoàng Phủ Dạ Thi and Hoàng Phủ Dạ Thư.)
Trần Lê Quốc Toàn	Trần	Lê	Quốc (lit. 'country')	Toàn (lit. 'fully')	(Note: His first padding name Lê is derived from his mother's surname (Lê Thị Quỳnh Nga).)

The Eastern name order with the surname placed first is the standard naming convention throughout the East Asian cultural sphere which Vietnam is a part of. The structure of Vietnamese names is similar to that of Chinese and Korean names, in that they share many common monosyllabic surnames such as Lý (Li/Lee), Trần (Chen/Jin), Hoàng (Huang/Hwang), Trịnh (Zheng/Jung),... while full names typically consist of two to four monosyllabic elements corresponding to Sino-Xenic morphemes historically derived from Chinese characters. The key difference is that Vietnamese people may be referred to by their full name, their primary name, or a kinship pronoun indicating the speaker's relationship to them, but the primary name is the most common form of address (by contrast, in Chinese and Korean, people are more commonly addressed by their surname or full name, depending on the social context). In the Western world and among many Vietnamese diaspora communities, Vietnamese names may also be written in the Western order with the surname placed last after the given name, for example Tam Dinh or Filip Nguyen.

The Vietnamese language is tonal, and so are Vietnamese names. Names with the same spelling but different tones represent different meanings, which can confuse people when the diacritics are dropped, as is commonly done outside Vietnam (e.g. Đoàn ([ɗʷà:n]) vs Doãn ([zʷǎ:ˀn]), both become Doan when diacritics are omitted). Additionally, through homonymy, some names can only be distinguished through context or by reference to their corresponding chữ Hán (Chinese characters), such as 南 (lit. 'south') or 男 (lit. 'men, boy'), both are read as "Nam". Vietnamese names have corresponding chữ Hán adopted early on during Chinese rule. The modern Latin-based writing system, chữ Quốc ngữ, popularized during the French colonial era, is fully romanized and has replaced the earlier, chữ Hán–based script, chữ Nôm.

As part of the criteria for naturalization as a Vietnamese citizen, foreigners applying for Vietnamese nationality must also adopt a Vietnamese name.

== Surnames ==
The surname (Vietnamese: họ) is positioned first and is passed on by the father to his children in a traditionally patrilineal order, but exceptions are possible. It is estimated that there are around 100 surnames in common use, but some are far more common than others. Nguyễn is by far the most common (31.5% in 2022), followed by Trần (10.9%) and Lê (8.9%).

=== History ===
Similar to Chinese and Korean, Vietnamese are shared many common monosyllabic surnames. Some scholars argue that all Vietnamese surnames are of Chinese origin, introduced during the thousand-year Chinese occupation of Vietnam, which began in 111 BCE with the Han Dynasty. Prior to this, evidence of distinct Vietnamese surnames is scarce due to a lack of written records. An alternative view suggests that Vietnamese surnames include both indigenous names and those borrowed from Chinese culture. Hypotheses propose that indigenous surnames may have evolved from place-names in the Red River delta (e.g., Nguyễn from "nguồn, ngòi" meaning spring or canal) or from traditional totems (e.g., Gà for "chicken tribe"). Historically, individuals sometimes adopted the surname of the ruling dynasty as a sign of loyalty, or were compelled to do so, particularly after dynastic changes. For example, during the Trần dynasty, individuals with the surname Lý (from the overthrown Lý dynasty) were ordered to change their surname to Nguyễn. The Nguyễn dynasty (1802-1945) further contributed to the prevalence of the Nguyễn surname. Additionally, surnames were sometimes changed to evade taxes, avoid penalties, or adhere to royal name taboos.

Vietnamese surnames also have origins from other ethnic groups, including Hoa (Khổng, Lưu, Trương), Khmer (Thạch, Sơn), Cham (Chế, Chiêm), and various ethnic minorities (Linh, Giáp, Ma).

=== Common surnames ===
The following are the most common surnames among Vietnamese, with their chữ Quốc ngữ spelling, and their corresponding Hán-Nôm characters. The figures are from a 2022 study 100 họ phổ biến ở Việt Nam (100 Most Popular Surnames In Vietnam) from the Vietnamese Social Science Publisher (Nhà xuất bản Khoa học Xã hội). In 2005, these 14 names had accounted for around 90% of the Vietnamese population.

1. Nguyễn (31.5%)
2. Trần (10.9%)
3. Lê (8.90%)
4. Phạm (5.90%)
5. Hoàng / Huỳnh (5.10%)
6. Vũ / Võ (4.90%)
7. Phan (2.80%)
8. Trương (2.20%)
9. Bùi (2.10%)
10. Đỗ (1.90%)
11. Đặng (1.90%)
12. Ngô (1.70%)
13. Hồ (1.50%)
14. Dương (1.40%)
15. Lý (1.00%)
16. Other (16.3%)
Source: Thống kê họ người Việt theo tỷ lệ % dân số 2022

Frequency of Vietnamese surnames
Rank	Surname	Pronunciation (IPA)	Chữ Hán	Percentage (2022)
1	Nguyễn	[ŋwiə̯nˀ]	阮	31.5%
2	Trần	[t̠͡ʂʌ̀n] ~ [cʌ̀n]	陳	10.9%
3	Lê	[lē] ~ [lī]	黎	8.9%
4	Phạm	[fâːmˀ]	范	5.9%
5	Hoàng / Huỳnh	[hwàːŋ] / [hɰìjŋ]	黃	5.1%
6	Vũ / Võ	[vǔʔ] / [vɔ̌ˀ]	武	4.9%
7	Phan	[fāːn]	潘	2.8%
8	Trương	[t̠͡ʂɯ̄ɤŋ]~[cɯ̄ɤŋ]	張	2.2%
9	Bùi	[ɓùj]	裴	2.1%
10	Đỗ	[ɗǒʔ]	杜	1.9%
11	Đặng	[ɗɐ̂ŋˀ]	鄧	1.9%
12	Ngô	[ŋʷōː]	吳	1.7%
13	Hồ	[hòː]	胡	1.5%
14	Dương	[zɯ̄ɤŋ]	楊	1.4%
15	Lý	[li˧˥]	李	1.0%
	Other			16.3%

The following list includes less-common surnames in alphabetical order which make up the other 16.3% (2022):

=== Other ===
- Ái: 愛
- An: 安
- Ân: 殷 / 恩
- Bạch: 白
- Bành: 彭
- Bao: 包 / 鮑
- Biên: 邊
- Biện: 卞
- Cam: 甘
- Cảnh: 景 / 耿
- Cao: 高
- Cái: 蓋
- Cát: 葛
- Chân: 甄 / 真
- Châu: 周 / 洲
- Chế: 制
- Chiêm: 詹
- Chu: 朱 / 周
- Chung: 鍾 / 鐘
- Chử: 褚
- Cổ: 古
- Cù: 瞿
- Cung: 龔 / 宮 / 共
- Củng: 鞏
- Cừu: 裘
- Dịch: 易
- Diệp: 葉
- Doãn: 尹
- Dũ: 俞
- Dung: 容 / 蓉
- Dư: 余
- Dữu: 庾
- Đái: 戴
- Đàm: 譚
- Đào: 陶
- Đậu: 竇
- Điền: 田
- Đinh: 丁
- Đoàn: 段
- Đồ: 涂 / 塗
- Đồng: 童 / Đồng: 同
- Đổng: 董
- Đường: 唐
- Giả: 賈
- Giải: 解
- Gia Cát: 諸葛
- Giản: 簡
- Giang: 江
- Giáp: 郟
- Hà: 何 / 河
- Hạ: 夏 / 賀
- Hác: 郝
- Hàn: 韓
- Hầu: 侯
- Hình: 邢
- Hoa: 花 / 華
- Hoắc: 霍
- Hoạn: 宦
- Hồng: 洪 / 紅
- Hứa: 許
- Hướng: 向
- Hy: 郗 / 希
- Kha: 柯
- Khâu: 邱 / 丘
- Khổng: 孔
- Khuất: 屈
- Kiều: 喬
- Kim: 金
- Kỳ: 祁 / 奇
- Kỷ: 紀
- La: 羅
- Lạc: 駱 / 樂
- Lại: 賴
- Lam: 藍 / 嵐
- Lăng: 凌
- Lãnh: 冷
- Lâm: 林
- Lận: 藺
- Lệ: 酈 / 麗
- Liên: 連
- Liêu: 廖
- Liễu: 柳
- Long: 龍
- Lôi: 雷
- Lục: 陸
- Lư: 盧
- Lữ: 呂
- Lương: 梁
- Lưu: 劉
- Mã: 馬
- Mạc: 莫
- Mạch: 麥
- Mai: 梅
- Mạnh: 孟
- Mao: 毛
- Mẫn: 閔 / 敏
- Miêu: 苗
- Minh: 明
- Mông: 蒙
- Ngân: 鄞 / 銀
- Nghê: 倪
- Nghiêm: 嚴
- Ngư: 魚
- Ngưu: 牛
- Nhạc: 岳 / 樂
- Nhan: 顔
- Nhâm: 任
- Nhiếp: 聶
- Nhiều: 饒
- Nhung: 戎
- Ninh: 寧 & 甯
- Nông: 農
- Ôn: 溫
- Ổn: 鄔
- Ông: 翁
- Phí: 費
- Phó: 傅
- Phong: 峰 / 風 / 豐 / 封 / 鋒
- Phòng: 房
- Phù: 符
- Phùng: 馮
- Phương: 方 / 芳
- Quách: 郭
- Quan: 關
- Quản: 管
- Quang: 光
- Quảng: 鄺
- Quế: 桂
- Quyền: 權
- Sài: 柴
- Sầm: 岑
- Sử: 史
- Tạ: 謝
- Tào: 曹
- Tăng: 曾
- Tân: 辛 / 新
- Tần: 秦
- Tất: 畢
- Tề: 齊
- Thạch: 石
- Thai: 邰
- Thái: 蔡
- Thang: 湯
- Thành: 成 / 誠
- Thảo: 草
- Thân: 申
- Thầm / Kham: 諶
- Thi: 施 / 詩
- Thích: 戚
- Thiện: 單 / 善
- Thiệu: 邵
- Thọ: 壽
- Thôi: 崔
- Thủy: 水
- Thư: 舒 / 書
- Thường: 常
- Tiền: 錢
- Tiết: 薛
- Tiêu: 蕭 / 焦
- Tô: 蘇
- Tôn: 孫
- Tôn Thất: 尊室 / Tôn Nữ: 尊女
- Tông: 宗
- Tống: 宋
- Trác: 卓
- Trạch: 翟 / 澤
- Tái: 賽
- Trang: 莊
- Trầm: 沈
- Trâu: 鄒
- Trì: 池
- Triệu: 趙
- Trịnh: 鄭
- Từ: 徐
- Tư Mã: 司馬
- Tưởng: 蔣
- Úc: 郁
- Ứng: 應
- Vạn: 萬
- Văn: 文
- Vân: 雲 / 雲 / 芸
- Vi: 韋
- Vĩnh: 永
- Vu: 于
- Vương: 王
- Vưu: 尤
- Xà: 佘
- Xa: 車
- Yên: 鄢
- Yến: 燕

In Vietnamese culture, women keep their surnames after marriage. Even though it is not required by law, children usually bear the father’s surname. After the French colonial period, there emerged a trend in which someone is given a padding name derived from the mother’s surname as a gesture of respect and remembrance (e.g. Trần Lê Quốc Toàn).

- In the name Trần Lê Quốc Toàn, the surname is not Trần Lê. Rather, the surname is Trần, inherited from his father, while Lê is his mother's surname and serves as a padding name. Therefore, a child of Trần Lê Quốc Toàn would inherit the surname Trần (or his wife's surname, depending on the naming choice). If the child takes the surname Trần, however, the name does not necessarily have to begin with Trần Lê, because Trần Lê is not an established compound surname.

In more casual contexts, people are usually on a "first-name basis", which involves their primary names, accompanied by proper kinship terms.

== Given names ==
Most Vietnamese given names (Vietnamese: tên riêng, or simply tên) are composite names, consists of an optional padding name and a mandatory primary name.

=== Padding name (middle name) ===
Padding name (Note: "Padding" here is used in the sense of "words that are used to make a speech, piece of writing, etc. longer, but that do not contain any interesting information", as defined by Oxford Learner's Dictionaries.) (Vietnamese: tên đệm, tên lót or chữ đệm, lit. 'padding name or padding character') in Vietnamese is optional. Due to be placed at the "middle" position in a Vietnamese full name, padding name is usually referred by term "middle name" in English. However, it has a very different role and usage compared to the middle name of Western naming conventions: as the prefix to supplement the primary name, it cannot be used independently and must be used together with the primary name when addressing a person. Therefore, padding name in Vietnamese is considered part of the given name, and always precedes the primary name.

- For example, Jacob Harry Maguire is commonly known as "Harry Maguire" and he can be addressed simply by his middle name "Harry", or Andrea Kimi Antonelli is commonly known as "Kimi Antonelli" and he can be addressed simply by his middle name "Kimi". However in Vietnamese custom, Nguyễn Văn Toàn is often addressed by primary name "Toàn" or formally "Văn Toàn", never addressed by only padding name "Văn", or reversed as "Toàn Văn". Because it is optional, Nguyễn Văn Toàn may be spelled shorter as "Nguyễn Toàn" by omitting "Văn", but the forms by surname with padding name such as "Nguyễn Văn" are never used.

Consequently, Vietnamese people do not have middle names in the English sense. Even when a Vietnamese name Nguyễn Văn Toàn is written in the Western order of "first name–middle name–last name", the padding name should be treated as part of the compound "first name" together with the primary name such as Van Toan Nguyen, rather than as an independent component functioning as a "middle name" such as Toan Van Nguyen (see more in misconception about padding names).

Most Vietnamese people have a monosyllablic padding name, but it is also quite common to have multisyllable or none at all such as Tô Lâm. Semantically, a padding name can stand alone (e.g., Văn or Thị), but it is usually combined with the primary name to form a more meaningful given name.

In the past, the padding name was selected by parents from a fairly narrow range of options. Almost all women had Thị (氏) as their padding name, and many men had Văn (文). More recently, a broader range of names has been used, and people named Thị usually omit their padding name because they do not like to call it with their name. For example, singer Hồ Ngọc Hà has birthname "Hồ Thị Ngọc Hà". Thị is a most common female padding name, and most common amongst pre-1975 generation but less common amongst younger generations. Thị (氏) is an archaic Sino-Vietnamese suffix meaning "clan; family; lineage; hereditary house" and attached to a woman's original surname, but now is used to simply indicate the female sex. For example, the name "Trần Thị Mai Loan" means "Mai Loan, a female person of the Trần family". Some traditional male padding names may include Văn (文), Hữu (有), Đức (德), Thành (誠), Công (公), Minh (明), and Quang (光).

The padding name can have several uses:

1. To indicate a person's generation. Brothers and sisters may share the same padding name, which distinguish them from the generation before them and the generation after them (see generation name).
2. To separate branches of a large family: "Nguyễn Hữu", "Nguyễn Sinh", "Trần Lâm" (padding names can be taken from the mother's surname). However, this usage is still controversial. Some people consider them to be a part of their surnames, not surname + padding name. Some families may, however, set up arbitrary rules about giving a different padding name to each generation. Examples include Nguyễn Phúc (阮福).
3. To indicate a person's position (birth order) in the family. This usage is less common than others.
4. To provide a poetic and positive meaning. E.g. "Trần Gia Hạnh Phúc" meaning "Happiness to the Trần family".
5. Some children take the father’s (or mother's) surname, their padding name is derived from the mother's (or father's) surname as a gesture of respect and remembrance. E.g. Trần Lê Quốc Toàn, Cao Pendant Quang Vinh.

The first three are not as common in the present-day as they are seen as too rigid and strictly conforming to family naming systems. Most padding names utilise the fourth, having a name to simply imply some positive characteristics.

=== Primary name ===
In most cases, the padding name is formally part of the primary name (Vietnamese: tên chính). For example, the name "Đinh Quang Dũng" is separated into the surname "Đinh" and the primary name "Quang Dũng". In a normal name list, those two parts of the full name are put in two different columns. However, in daily conversation, the last syllable in a primary name with a title before it is used to call or address a person: "ông Dũng", "anh Dũng", etc., with "ông" and "anh" being words to address the person and depend on age, social position, etc.

The primary name is the primary form of address for Vietnamese. It is chosen by parents and usually has a literal meaning in the Vietnamese language. Names often represent beauty, such as flower names of Cúc (菊) or Mai (梅) for women, or attributes and characteristics that the parents want in their child, such as Trí (智, lit. 'smart') or Dũng (勇, lit. 'brave') for men.

Double names are also common. For example:

- Trương Mỹ Hoa has the primary name Mỹ Hoa (lit. 'beautiful flower'). Semantically she doesn't have any padding name, although "Mỹ" is often mistaken for one.
- Nguyễn Thị Kim Ngân has the primary name Kim Ngân (lit. 'gold & silver'). Semantically she has only one padding name "Thị", however "Kim" is also often mistaken for an additional one.

Typically, Vietnamese will be addressed with their primary name, even in formal situations, although an honorific equivalent to "Mr.", "Mrs.", etc. will be added when necessary. That contrasts with the situation in many other cultures in which the surname is used in formal situations, but it is a practice similar to usage in Icelandic usage and, to some degree, Polish. It is similar to the Latin-American and southern European custom of referring to women as "Doña/Dona" and men as "Don/Dom", along with their first name.

When a more formal form of address is needed for highly respected or famous individuals, Vietnamese usually uses fullname (sometimes omitting or replacing the padding name, especially "Thị"), or use a two-syllable variation of it, rather than addressing by only the final syllable of their primary name. This practice helps avoid addressing someone in an overly casual, blunt or dry manner, making the form of address sound less rough and more respectful in formal contexts. For example:

- For politicians, address formally by their full name (often preceded by their official title), such as Chủ tịch nước Tô Lâm (not "Chủ tịch nước Lâm"), Thủ tướng Lê Minh Hưng (not "Thủ tướng Hưng"), Chủ tịch Quốc hội Nguyễn Thị Kim Ngân (not "Chủ tịch Quốc hội Ngân").
- For celebrities (artists, entertainers, athletes, etc.), address politely by their full name, or at least a two-syllable name (can be preceded by their professional title), such as cầu thủ (Lê) Công Vinh (not "cầu thủ Vinh"), ca sĩ Mỹ Tâm (not "ca sĩ Tâm"), ca sĩ Hồ Ngọc Hà (not "ca sĩ Hà"), người mẫu Phạm Hương (not "người mẫu Hương").

Addressing someone by only the surname is rare in the current. In the past, women were usually called by their (maiden) surname, with thị (氏) as a suffix, similar to China and Korea. In recent years, doctors are more likely than any other social group to be addressed by their surname, but that form of reference is more common in the north than in the south. Some extremely famous people are sometimes referred to by their surnames regardless of whether the name is an alias, such as Hồ Chí Minh (Bác Hồ—"Uncle Hồ") (although his real name is Nguyễn Sinh Cung), Trịnh Công Sơn (nhạc Trịnh—"Trịnh music"), and Hồ Xuân Hương (nữ sĩ họ Hồ—"the poetess with the surname Hồ").

== Non-traditional names ==
=== Foreign names ===
If either the father or mother is a foreigner and is married to a Vietnamese citizen, and their child is born in Vietnam and registered with Vietnamese nationality from the outset, the child may take the surname of either the foreign parent or the Vietnamese parent; however, the given name (underlining) must be Vietnamese, such as "Smith Tuấn Anh" (or Tuan-Anh Smith in Western order) is acceptable, but "Nguyễn David" (David Nguyen) is not. For those born abroad who wish to acquire Vietnamese citizenship, they may keep their foreign name (regardless of whether it is the surname or the given name in the original name) after becoming Vietnamese citizens, such as "Hoàng Vũ Samson", "Huỳnh Kesley Alves", "Nguyễn Filip", "Cao Pendant Quang Vinh".

- Some Vietnamese persons may be allowed to adopt a variation of foreign name, provided that it conforms to Vietnamese spelling conventions. For example, Lâm Ti Phông was named after the pronunciation of "Natipong”, reflecting his father's admiration for Thai footballer Natipong Sritong-In.

=== Saints' names ===
Vietnamese Catholics are given a saint's name at baptism (Vietnamese: tên thánh (holy name) or tên rửa tội (baptism name)). Boys are given male saints' names, while girls are given female saints' names. This name appears first, before the surname, in formal religious contexts. Out of respect, clergy are usually referred to by saints' name. The saint's name also functions as a posthumous name, used instead of an individual's personal name in prayers after their death. The most common saints' names are taken from the New Testament, such as Phêrô (Peter, or Pierre in French), Phaolô (Paul), Gioan (John), Maria (Mary), and Anna or they may remain as they are without Vietnamisation.

Saints' names are respelled phonetically according to the Vietnamese alphabet. Some more well-known saints' names are derived further into names that sound more Vietnamese or easier to pronounce for Vietnamese speakers.

Etymologies of some saints' names
Saint	Name in Romance language	Vietnamese names
Alexander	Alexandre (Portuguese)	A Lịch Sơn (亞歷山), Alexanđê
Andrew	André (Portuguese)	An-rê (安移)
Anthony	Antônio (Portuguese)	Antôn (安尊), Antôniô (安尊衣烏)
Benedict	Benedictus (Latin)	Bênêđictô (陂泥𠫾蘇), Biển Đức
Clement	Clemente (Portuguese)	Clêmêntê, Lê Minh
Constantine	Constantino (Portuguese)	Constantinô, Công Tăng
Dominic	Domingos (Portuguese)	Đôminicô, Dumingô, Đa Minh (多明)
Francis	Francisco (Portuguese)	Phanchicô, Phanxicô (潘支姑)
Helena	Helena (Portuguese)	Hà Liên
Ignatius	Inácio (Portuguese), Ignacio (Spanish)	Inhaxiô, Y Nhã, I-na-xu (衣那枢)
John the Baptist	Juan Bautista (Spanish)	Gio-an Baotixita (由安 包卑吹些)
Joseph	Giuseppe (Italian)	Giuse (樞槎)
Martin	Martinus (Latin), Martinho (Portuguese)	Martinô (沫卑奴), Máctinô, Mạc Tính, Mạc Ty Nho
Mary Magdalene	Maria Madalena (Portuguese)	Ma-ri-a Ma-đa-lê-na (瑪移亞 瑪多黎那)
Paul	Paulus (Latin), Paulo (Portuguese)	Phaolô (抛祿), Bảo Lộc (保祿)
Peter	Pero (Portuguese)	Phêrô (批嚕)
Thaddaeus	Tadeu (Portuguese)	Tađêô (些低烏), Thanh Diêu
Urban	Urbanus (Latin), Urbano (Portuguese)	Urbanô, Ước Bang

== Near-homonyms distinguished by vowel or tones ==
Some names may appear the same if simplified into a basic ASCII script, as for example on websites, but are different names:

- Trịnh Căn (鄭根, 1633–1709) reformist warlord, vs. Trịnh Cán (鄭檊, 1777–1782) infant heir of warlord Trịnh Sâm
- Nguyễn Du (1765–1820) writer, vs. Nguyễn Dữ (c.1550) writer
- Hoàng Tích Chu (1897–1933) journalist, vs. Hoàng Tích Chù (1912–2003) painter
- Nguyễn Văn Tỵ (1917–1992) painter and poet, vs. Nguyễn Văn Tý (1925–2019), composer
- Phan Thanh Hùng (1960) football manager, vs. Phan Thanh Hưng (1987), footballer
- Nguyễn Bình (1906–1951), vs. Nguyễn Bính (1918–1966)
- Nguyễn Văn Hưng (1958) representative of the Vietnam National Assembly, vs. Nguyễn Văn Hùng (1980), martial artist

Typically, as in the above examples, it is middle or the last primary name which varies, as almost any Hán-Nôm character may be used. The number of surnames is limited.

Further, some historical names may be written using different chữ Hán (Chinese characters), but are still written the same in the modern Vietnamese alphabet.

== Presentation in English ==
=== Name spelling without diacritics ===
Due to foreigners' limited familiarity with writing and typing Vietnamese diacritics, as well as the risk of encoding errors that can corrupt font display of diacritics or cause them to be replacement characters such as �, Vietnamese names are often written without diacritics in English, e.g. "Ho Chi Minh" instead of "Hồ Chí Minh" to avoid it being displayed as "H� Ch� Minh". However, this may lead to pronunciation distortions that even Vietnamese speakers cannot accurately verify when the name is transliterated back into Vietnamese with diacritics. For example, surname Đoàn ([ɗʷà:n]) vs Doãn ([zʷǎ:ˀn]), both become Doan when diacritics are omitted and can only be distinguished by IPA or respelling.

- Under the FIFA's rules on "Names and Numbers", the names of players on the jerseys of national teams must be printed using Latin characters only, but do not require them to be limited to the English alphabet, and letters with diacritics are also permitted. Therefore, the names of players representing the Vietnam national football team may be printed in the Vietnamese alphabet, which is also the Latin script, with full diacritics while still complying with the regulations. However, the Vietnam Football Federation (VFF) generally uses names without diacritics on the jerseys of the national team. For example, Nguyễn Hoàng Đức is typically printed as "N. Hoang Duc" on the national team jersey, even though "N. Hoàng Đức" would also be fully compliant with FIFA's regulations.

=== Indexing, sorting and name order reversal ===
Based on the Vietnamese custom of addressing individuals by the last monosyllable of their primary name, the English-language Chicago Manual of Style indexes Vietnamese names according to the "primary-name, surname padding-name", with a cross-reference placed in regards to the surname. Ngô Đình Diệm would be listed as "Diem, Ngo Dinh" and Võ Nguyên Giáp would be listed as "Giap, Vo Nguyen". In Vietnamese-language sources, names are also generally organized in this manner.

However, indexing the name in the form "Giap, Vo Nguyen" can be misleading as it suggests that "Võ Nguyên" is the surname (see more in the formatting). Likewise, when the comma is omitted such as "Giap Vo Nguyen" (primary-name→surname→padding-name), it may also confuse Western readers by implying that the padding name "Nguyên" is the "last name" because it appears at the end of the name, whereas in reality the person’s actual surname is solely "Võ".

- Real-life examples: Emil Le Giang and Patrik Le Giang are brothers born in Slovakia to a Vietnamese father Lê Giang Nam, and a Slovak mother. When their father obtained Slovak citizenship, his name was registered incorrectly with "Lê Giang" treated as the surname and "Nam" as the given name (instead of "Lê" for the surname and "Giang Nam" for the given name). As a result, under Slovak naming laws, both Patrik and Emil inherited the surname "Le Giang" rather than "Le". However, when looking at the full name "Patrik Le Giang", people often mistakenly think "Giang" is Patrik's actual "last name", even though it originally came from his father’s padding name.

Nowadays, to avoid problems caused by mistakes with surnames, Vietnamese names in English are commonly indexed according to "padding-name→primary-name→surname" in the Western order such as "Nguyen Giap Vo" instead of "Giap Vo Nguyen", to determine exactly the surname "Vo", which corresponds to the true "last name" in English texts (especially in media such as TV on-screen graphics, websites, and social media at sports events). At the very least, this helps Western readers identify the correct surname "Võ", rather than mistaking the padding name "Nguyen" for the surname and confusing it with "Nguyễn".

Due to the high frequency of the same surnames in Vietnamese names (having around one-third of the Vietnamese people using the surname Nguyễn), it has also become more popular to be referred by given name in English. For example, Lê Minh Hưng (or Minh Hung Le in Western order) can be referred to as "(Mr.) Minh Hung" or simply as "(Mr.) Hung". Addressing by surname such as "(Mr.) Le" is also used.

=== Presentation in passport and paperworks ===
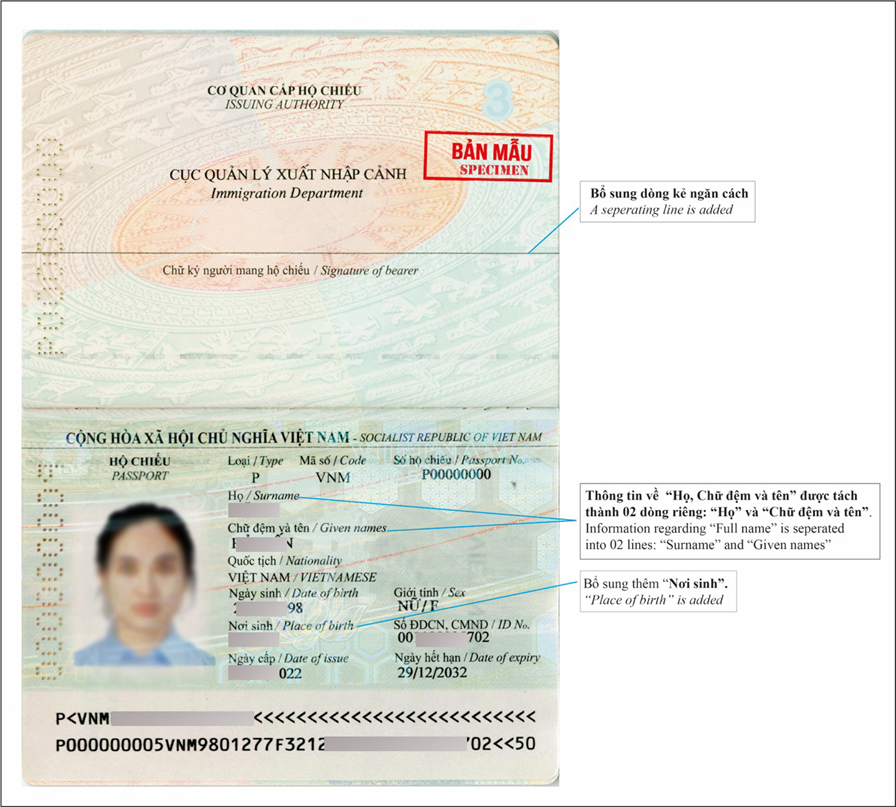
The contemporary layout of the Vietnamese passport, with the standard designation of the person's name.

Because not everyone understands the division between the surname and given name indicated by the double less-than sign << (double filler characters) in Machine-Readable Zone (MRZ), since 2023, names in Vietnamese passports have been split into two lines as "surname" and "given names" instead of included all into only one line "full name", with the padding name treated as a part with the primary name in order to match the format of "given names", and avoid misunderstanding the padding name as part of the surname. It also aligns with the name format SURNAME<<GIVENNAMES in the MRZ for Vietnamese names as SURNAME<<PADDINGNAME<PRIMARYNAME, and the name order with alphabetization by surname with comma according to the "Surname, Given names" format as "Surname, Padding-name Primary-name". For example:

- "Trần Văn Tuấn" is presented in two lines with "Trần" as the surname and "Văn Tuấn" as the given name (where "Văn" is the original padding name and "Tuấn" is the original primary name). It is represented as TRAN<<VAN<TUAN in the MRZ and as "Tran, Van Tuan" in the format "Surname, Given names".
- "Nguyễn Thị Kim Ngân" is presented in two lines with "Nguyễn" as the surname and "Thị Kim Ngân" as the given name (where "Thị" is the original padding name and "Kim Ngân" is the original primary name). It is represented as NGUYEN<<THI<KIM<NGAN in the MRZ and as "Nguyen, Thi Kim Ngan" in the format "Surname, Given names".

Comparison of Vietnamese and English name structures
Original fullname		Vietnamese name (Eastern order)		English name (Western order)	
Original fullname		Nguyễn Minh Oanh	Nguyễn Thị Minh Oanh	John William Smith	John William Henry Smith
MRZ's format		NGUYEN<<MINH<OANH	NGUYEN<<THI<MINH<OANH	SMITH<<JOHN<WILLIAM	SMITH<<JOHN<WILLIAM<HENRY
Surname		Nguyễn	Nguyễn	Smith	Smith
Given name		Minh Oanh (padding name→primary name)	Thị Minh Oanh (padding name→primary name)	John William (first name→middle name)	John William Henry (first name→middle name)
"Surname, Given name"		Nguyen, Minh Oanh	Nguyen, Thi Minh Oanh	Smith, John William	Smith, John William Henry
Reversed order		Minh Oanh Nguyen	Thi Minh Oanh Nguyen	Smith John William	Smith John William Henry
Emphasized surname (Or given name initials)	Western order	Minh Oanh **NGUYEN** (M. O. Nguyen)	Thi Minh Oanh **NGUYEN** (T. M. O. Nguyen)	John William **SMITH** (J. W. Smith)	John William Henry **SMITH** (J. W. H. Smith)
Emphasized surname (Or given name initials)	Eastern order	**NGUYEN** Minh Oanh (Nguyen M. O.)	**NGUYEN** Thi Minh Oanh (Nguyen T. M. O.)	**SMITH** John William (Smith J. W.)	**SMITH** John William Henry (Smith J. W. H.)

However, because almost all Vietnamese surnames are monosyllabic and little attention is given to compound surnames (such as Hoàng Phủ, Tôn Thất, Tôn Nữ, Âu Dương), the first syllable of a compound surname is often designated as the sole surname, while the second syllable is treated as a padding name. For example:

- "Hoàng, Phủ Ngọc Tường" (HOANG<<PHU<NGOC<TUONG) instead of "Hoàng Phủ, Ngọc Tường" (HOANG<PHU<<NGOC<TUONG), due to confusion between Hoàng Phủ and Hoàng.
- "Tôn, Thất Thuyết" (TON<<THAT<THUYET) instead of "Tôn Thất, Thuyết" (TON<THAT<<THUYET), due to confusion between Tôn Thất and Tôn.
- "Tôn, Nữ Thị Ninh" (TON<<NU<THI<NINH) instead of "Tôn Nữ, Thị Ninh" (TON<NU<<THI<NINH), due to confusion between Tôn Nữ and Tôn.

Vietnamese people do not have the practice of using hyphens (e.g., Hoàng-Phủ Ngọc-Tường) or any other markers to indicate the "partition" of their names, and they may sometimes omit their padding names in Western contexts for simplified translation or presentation. The more syllables a name has, the more complicated it becomes to fill it into the required fields.

The following tables show several methods for filling Vietnamese names in Western paperwork. The entries highlighted in the green background indicate the recommended method which is to leave the "Middle Name" field blank and fill all parts of the given name, including both the original padding name precedes the primary name into the "First Name" field, to avoid issues such as surname confusion, or incorrect order of original given name, ensure that the original padding name is always positioned before the primary name as same as in Vietnamese (see more in the misconception about padding names), while also preventing any part of the given name (especially the primary name) from being omitted by being filled into the "Middle Name" field (see more in mistaking original primary name for a "middle name"). This is particularly important in procedures such as visa applications and airline ticketing.

Western presentations of the 3-syllable name Nguyễn Minh Oanh (name in MRZ: NGUYEN<<MINH<OANH)
With "middle name" field	First Name	Middle Name (optional)	Last Name	Full presentation	Presentation excluded middle name
With "middle name" field	Minh Oanh	(blank)	Nguyen	Minh Oanh Nguyen (Nguyen, Minh Oanh)	
With "middle name" field	Oanh	Minh	Nguyen	Oanh Minh Nguyen (Nguyen, Oanh Minh)	Oanh Nguyen (Nguyen, Oanh)
With "middle name" field	Minh	Oanh	Nguyen	Minh Oanh Nguyen (Nguyen, Minh Oanh)	Minh Nguyen (Nguyen, Minh)
Without "middle name" field	Given Names		Surname	Full presentation	Presentation excluded middle name
Without "middle name" field	Minh Oanh		Nguyen	Minh Oanh Nguyen (Nguyen, Minh Oanh)	

Western presentations of the 4-syllable name Nguyễn Thị Minh Oanh (name in MRZ: NGUYEN<<THI<MINH<OANH)
With "middle name" field	First Name	Middle Name (optional)	Last Name	Full presentation	Presentation excluded middle name
With "middle name" field	Thi Minh Oanh	(blank)	Nguyen	Thi Minh Oanh Nguyen (Nguyen, Thi Minh Oanh)	
With "middle name" field	Minh Oanh	Thi	Nguyen	Minh Oanh Thi Nguyen (Nguyen, Minh Oanh Thi)	Minh Oanh Nguyen (Nguyen, Minh Oanh)
With "middle name" field	Oanh	Thi Minh	Nguyen	Oanh Thi Minh Nguyen (Nguyen, Oanh Thi Minh)	Oanh Nguyen (Nguyen, Oanh)
With "middle name" field	Thi	Minh Oanh	Nguyen	Thi Minh Oanh Nguyen (Nguyen, Thi Minh Oanh)	Thi Nguyen (Nguyen, Thi)
With "middle name" field	Thi Minh	Oanh	Nguyen	Thi Minh Oanh Nguyen (Nguyen, Thi Minh Oanh)	Thi Minh Nguyen (Nguyen, Thi Minh)
Without "middle name" field	Given Names		Surname	Full presentation	Presentation excluded middle name
Without "middle name" field	Thi Minh Oanh		Nguyen	Thi Minh Oanh Nguyen (Nguyen, Thi Minh Oanh)	

Western presentations of the 2-syllable name Nguyễn Oanh (name in MRZ: NGUYEN<<OANH)
With "middle name" field	First Name	Middle Name (optional)	Last Name	Full Presentation	Presentation excluded middle name
With "middle name" field	Oanh	(blank)	Nguyen	Oanh Nguyen (Nguyen, Oanh)	
Without "middle name" field	Given Names		Surname	Full Presentation	Presentation excluded middle name
Without "middle name" field	Oanh		Nguyen	Oanh Nguyen (Nguyen, Oanh)	

=== Formatting Vietnamese names in the media, and the confusion of the padding name as part of the surname ===
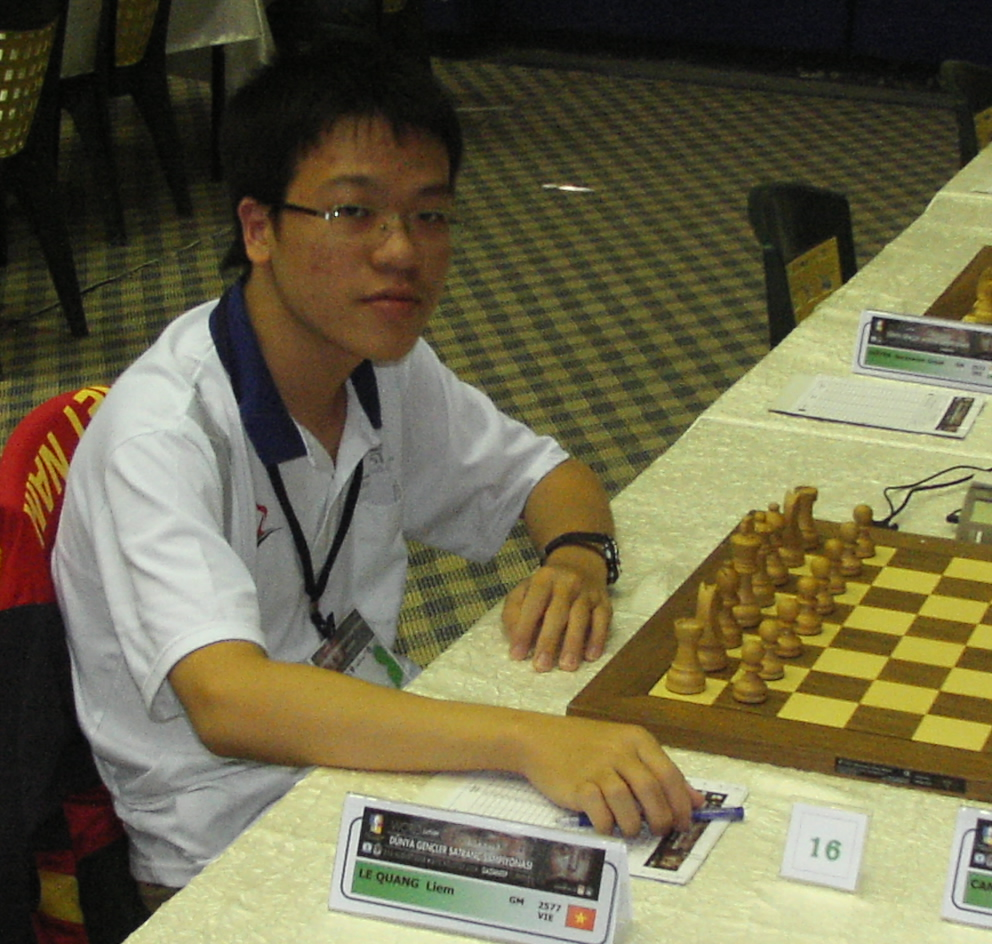
Chess GM Lê Quang Liêm at the World Junior Chess Championship (2008). His name on the desk nameplate was stylized incorrectly as "LE QUANG Liem”, which could mislead viewers into confusing that his surname was "Lê Quang” rather than the correct surname "Lê”. In FIDE records, his name is listed in the format of "Surname, Given names" as "Le, Quang Liem”, similar to his name in MRZ as LE<<QUANG<LIEM. Therefore, the corresponding styling on the nameplate must be correct as "LE Quang Liem".

Many English-language sports broadcasts and sporting events distinguish the surname from the given name by visually emphasized surnames, typically through boldface or all capitalization (e.g. Harry KANE, Alexis MAC ALLISTER, SON Heung-min) (Note: Another styling convention displays the full name in uppercase while rendering the given name (whose letters are normally lowercase) in a smaller font size, such as "HARYY KANE", "ALEXIS MAC ALLISTER", "SON HEUNG-MIN".). In some cases, no such typographical convention is used but the full surname is retained while the given name is abbreviated to an initial (H. Kane, A. Mac Allister, Son H.M.).

The following are common presentation methods used in the English media for Vietnamese names:

Styling surname and given name of Phạm Tuấn Anh (name in MRZ: PHAM<<TUAN<ANH) in English
Methods	Bolding or all capitalization (Western/Eastern order)		Two-line layout (Western/Eastern order)		"Surname, Given names"
Correct styling (emphasize only surname)	Tuan Anh **PHAM** (T. A. Pham)	**PHAM** Tuan Anh (Pham T. A.)	Tuan Anh; **PHAM**	**PHAM**; Tuan Anh	Pham, Tuan Anh
Incorrect styling (emphasize even padding name)	Anh **PHAM TUAN** (A. Pham Tuan)	**PHAM TUAN** Anh (Pham Tuan A.)	Anh; **PHAM TUAN**	**PHAM TUAN**; Anh	Pham Tuan, Anh

Styling surname and given name of Phạm Văn Tuấn Anh (name in MRZ: PHAM<<VAN<TUAN<ANH) in English
Methods	Bolding or all capitalization (Western/Eastern order)		Two-line layout (Western/Eastern order)		"Surname, Given names"
Correct styling (emphasize only surname)	Van Tuan Anh **PHAM** (V. T. A. Pham)	**PHAM** Van Tuan Anh (Pham V. T. A.)	Van Tuan Anh; **PHAM**	**PHAM**; Van Tuan Anh	Pham, Van Tuan Anh
Incorrect styling (emphasize even padding name)	Anh **PHAM VAN TUAN** (A. Pham Van Tuan)	**PHAM VAN TUAN** Anh (Pham Van Tuan A.)	Anh; **PHAM VAN TUAN**	**PHAM VAN TUAN**; Anh	Pham Van Tuan, Anh
Incorrect styling (emphasize even padding name)	Tuan Anh **PHAM VAN** (T. A. Pham Van)	**PHAM VAN** Tuan Anh (Pham Van T. A.)	Tuan Anh; **PHAM VAN**	**PHAM VAN**; Tuan Anh	Pham Van, Tuan Anh

A Vietnamese name such as "Phạm Tuấn Anh", where "Phạm" is the surname and "Tuấn Anh" is the given name, should be correctly indexed in the form of "Surname, Given names" as "Pham, Tuan Anh", and stylized by visually emphasized surnames as either "Tuan Anh PHAM" or "PHAM Tuan Anh".

Most Vietnamese surnames are monosyllabic. However, due to Vietnamese people are commonly addressed by the primary name, as well as by the final syllable of their given name, some people may mistakenly assume that only "Anh" is the given name, causing the padding name "Tuấn" to be incorrectly treated as part of the surname, resulting in an incorrect form of "Surname, Given names" such as "Pham Tuan, Anh". This misunderstanding may lead to the unnecessary emphasis of the padding name, such as "Anh PHAM TUAN" or "PHAM TUAN Anh", potentially causing viewers to misinterpret "Phạm Tuấn" as a surname, even though it is not an actual one.

- In the Olympics, name of swimmer Nguyễn Thị Ánh Viên (Nguyen, Thi Anh Vien) was incorrectly displayed on TV on-screen graphics as "Vien **NGUYEN THI ANH**" at the Rio 2016 and "Anh Vien **NGUYEN THI ANH**" at the Tokyo 2020. It should be displayed correctly as "Thi Anh Vien **NGUYEN**" or "**NGUYEN** Thi Anh Vien" due to her true surname is solely "Nguyễn". She has a younger brother who is also a swimmer named Nguyễn Quang Thuấn (Nguyen, Quang Thuan), should be emphasized correctly as "Quang Thuan **NGUYEN**" or "**NGUYEN** Quang Thuan, not as "Thuan **NGUYEN QUANG**" or "**NGUYEN QUANG** Thuan". Normally, full siblings never have different surname.

In Olympics' events, while Chinese, Korean, Japanese athletes' names is displayed in their original order of "SURNAME Given-name", Vietnamese athletes' names are still displayed in reversed order of "Given-name SURNAME" on TV on-screen graphics, due to Vietnam having not yet been included in the countries list of Use and rules of each participant name > TV Name "Switching" in the document Language Guidelines & Participant Names of the Olympic Data Feed, which has included almost countries in the East Asian cultural sphere such as China, Korea, and Japan (formerly Japan was also treated with the Western order until has been included since 2020). Conversely, in almost badminton tournaments of BWF's system, some players' names from Vietnam are displayed in the original order, while Japan's names are not.

- For example, name of badminton player Nguyễn Tiến Minh is displayed in reversed order as "Tien Minh NGUYEN" at Olympics and in original order as "NGUYEN Tien Minh" at BWF's tournaments.

=== Abbreviation ===
There are three common types to abbreviate a Vietnamese name:

1. Informal: keep the last syllable in full, and abbreviate remains in initials.
2. Formal: keep the last two syllables in full, and abbreviate remains in initials. (Note: For individuals whose full names contain more than three words, the padding name is sometimes abbreviated so that the unabbreviated portion of the personal name is reduced to two words and does not appear excessively long.) (Note: The padding name Thị (氏) which historically means "a person of this family line", has fallen out of favor among modern Vietnamese women. Many who have Thị as a middle name now prefer to abbreviate it in writing. For example, Nguyễn T. Liễu instead of N. Thị Liễu, or omit it entirely, referring to themselves simply as Nguyễn Liễu.)
3. Keep surname in full, and abbreviate remains (given name) in initials. Often used in English if surname in full is mandatory.

Name in Vietnamese (Eastern order)					Name in English (visually emphasized surnames)			
Full name	Surname	Given name (Padding + Primary name)	Abbreviated		Eastern order		Western order	
Full name	Surname	Given name (Padding + Primary name)	Informal (type 1)	Formal (type 2)	Full name	Abbreviated (type 3)	Full name	Abbreviated (type 3)
Phạm Tuân	Phạm	Tuân	P. Tuân	Phạm Tuân	PHAM Tuan	PHAM T.	Tuan PHAM	T. PHAM
Hoàng Xuân Vinh	Hoàng	Xuân Vinh	H. X. Vinh	H. Xuân Vinh	HOANG Xuan Vinh	HOANG X. V.	Xuan Vinh HOANG	X. V. HOANG
Nguyễn Văn Toàn	Nguyễn	Văn Toàn	N. V. Toàn	N. Văn Toàn	NGUYEN Van Toan	NGUYEN V. T.	Van Toan NGUYEN	V. T. NGUYEN
Lê Quang Liêm	Lê	Quang Liêm	L. Q. Liêm	L. Quang Liêm	LE Quang Liem	LE Q. L.	Quang Liem LE	Q. L. LE
Nguyễn Ngọc Trường Sơn	Nguyễn	Ngọc Trường Sơn	N. N. T. Sơn	N. N. Trường Sơn	NGUYEN Ngoc Truong Son	NGUYEN N. T. S.	Ngoc Truong Son NGUYEN	N. T. S. NGUYEN
Nguyễn Thị Ánh Viên	Nguyễn	Thị Ánh Viên	N. T. A. Viên	N. T. Ánh Viên	NGUYEN Thi Anh Vien	NGUYEN T. A. V.	Thi Anh Vien NGUYEN	T. A. V. NGUYEN
Nguyễn Thị Liễu	Nguyễn	Thị Liễu	N. T. Liễu	N. Thị Liễu	NGUYEN Thi Lieu	NGUYEN T. L.	Thi Lieu NGUYEN	T. L. NGUYEN

=== Misconception that Vietnamese padding names are the same as Western middle names ===
There are certain cases in which Vietnamese personal names written in full English form are rearranged symmetrically around the padding name, by swapping the surname with the final syllable of the primary name, resulting in the order "primary-name→padding-name→surname", which resembles the English style of "first-name→middle-name→last name". For example:

- Võ Nguyên Giáp is reordered as "Giap Nguyen Vo"
- Trần Lê Quốc Toàn is reordered as "Toan Le Quoc Tran"

This stems from a confusion that Vietnamese original padding names, due to be located at the "middle", would be equivalent to Western middle names in Western naming conventions. However, as mentioned above, the issue here is not about its position, but the fundamentally different ways in which Vietnamese padding names and Western middle names are used:

- Vietnamese padding names originally occupy the "middle" position in the Eastern name order which places the surname first and the given name last, rather than in the Western name order which places the given name first and the surname last. Consequently, Vietnamese given names follow the original order of "padding name → primary name", unlike traditional English given names, in which middle names follow the first name in the original Western name order. The padding name is not normally used independently but serves only as a prefix to support the primary name in both pronunciation and meaning. Therefore, original Vietnamese names do not have term of "middle name" in the English sense, and the padding name must remain before the primary name such as "Nguyen Giap" and "Le Quoc Toan", even when written in English form. Reversing the order and placing the padding name after the primary name would break the standard structure of the original Vietnamese given name, resulting in forms such as "Giap Nguyen" and "Toan Le Quoc", may also alter or even eliminate the original meaning conveyed by the original given name. This differs from the traditional English use of middle names, which can be used independently in place of the first name, and generally do not bear a semantic relationship to or complement one another.
  - In 2020, a Vietnamese American female college student whose has Vietnamese name was Nguyễn Bùi Diễm Phúc used the reversed form "Phuc Bui Diem Nguyen" (Nguyen, Phuc Bui Diem) instead of correct form "Bui Diem Phuc Nguyen" (Nguyen, Bui Diem Phuc) in English, due to "Bui Diem" was mistakenly treated as an English-style middle name (semantically in Vietnamese, Bùi is the padding name which derived from her mother's surname, while Diễm Phúc is the meaningful primary name). A professor in the college asked Nguyen to adopt an Anglicized name, explaining that the pronunciation of "Phuc Bui Diem Nguyen" resembled a profanity and "sounds like an insult in English". Nguyen rejected, arguing that the professor had discriminated against her because of her name. The professor later responded, stating, "I understand you are offended, but you need to understand your name is an offensive sound in my language" and requested her to rename again. Nguyen did not accept the explanation, and the incident ultimately resulted in the professor being suspended.
- Moreover, this ordering can lead to misunderstandings about given name when dealing with different types of official documents. For instance, some forms provide a dedicated "Middle Name" field (which is usually optional to fill), while others (such as the IELTS registration form) do not, this may result in the given name being recorded as "Giap Nguyen" or "Giap" (omitted "middle name") in a document, while being recorded as "Nguyen Giap" in another. Such inconsistencies may create administrative complications for Vietnamese people in other countries, because even though all the documents refer to the same individual de facto, local authorities may mistakenly assume that they belong to different people de jure, due to different records of given names ("Giap Nguyen" vs. "Nguyen Giap") and full names ("Giap Nguyen Vo" vs. "Nguyen Giap Vo").
  - Real-life examples: Hanoi FC's owner and former chairman Đỗ Quang Hiển has two sons Đỗ Quang Vinh and current chairman Đỗ Vinh Quang. If Đỗ Vinh Quang is reversed into "Quang Vinh Do" instead of "Vinh Quang Do", not only is the given name altered incorrectly from original "Vinh Quang" to "Quang Vinh", but it could also cause both Western and Vietnamese authorities or institutions to mistakenly interpret information or documents originally referring to Đỗ Vinh Quang as referring instead to his elder brother, Đỗ Quang Vinh.

Consequently, when a Vietnamese personal name (surname→padding-name→primary-name) is written in full-name form following the Western order of "given name→surname", it is generally recommended that it be reordered as "padding-name→primary-name→surname". In other words, only the surname (shown in bold) should be moved to the final position, while all components of the given name (underlined) should remain in their original order as "padding-name→primary-name", rather than being reversed to "primary-name→padding-name". For examples:

- **Võ** Nguyên Giáp (VO<<NGUYEN<GIAP) is reordered as "Nguyen Giap **Vo**"
- **Trần** Lê Quốc Toàn (TRAN<<LE<QUOC<TOAN) is reordered as "Le Quoc Toan **Tran**"
- **Nguyễn** Bùi Diễm Phúc (NGUYEN<<BUI<DIEM<PHUC) is reordered as "Bui Diem Phuc **Nguyen**"
- **Đỗ** Quang Vinh (DO<<QUANG<VINH) is reordered as "Quang Vinh **Do**"
- **Đỗ** Vinh Quang (DO<<VINH<QUANG) is reordered as "Vinh Quang **Do**"

Along with this, when filling in the form of 3-name fields "First Name – Middle Name – Last Name", it is advisable to leave the "Middle Name" field blank and enter the entire "padding-name primary-name" sequence, as a compound given name, into the "First Name" field, such as:

- "Nguyen Giap – (blank) – Vo", instead of "Giap – Nguyen – Vo"
- "Le Quoc Toan – (blank) – Tran", instead of "Toan – Le Quoc – Tran"
- "Bui Diem Phuc – (blank) – Nguyen", instead of "Phuc – Bui Diem – Nguyen"
- "Quang Vinh – (blank) – Do", instead of "Vinh – Quang – Do"
- "Vinh Quang – (blank) – Do", instead of "Quang – Vinh – Do"

This practice helps preserve the Vietnamese given name in its best proper form as original "Le Quoc Toan" when filling in both forms of 3-name fields "First Name – Middle Name – Last Name" and 2-name fields "Given names – Surname", minimizes complications arising from inconsistent ordering of the given name’s monosyllabic elements across different documents, aligns with the name format SURNAME<<GIVENNAMES in the Machine-Readable Zone (MRZ) such as TRAN<<LE<QUOC<TOAN, and remains consistent with "Surname, Given name" format such as "Tran, Le Quoc Toan" rather than "Tran, Toan Le Quoc" (see in Presentation in passport and paperworks).

Name in Vietnamese (Eastern order)			Reverse to Western order (bold: part was filled in Last Name field)	
Full name (in MRZ)	Surname (recommend to fill in Last Name field)	Given name (recommend to fill all in First Name field)	Recommended order	Not recommended order (underline: part was filled in Middle Name field)
Võ Nguyên Giáp (VO<<NGUYEN<GIAP)	Võ	Nguyên Giáp	Nguyen Giap **Vo** (Vo, Nguyen Giap)	Giap Nguyen **Vo** (Vo, Giap Nguyen) => wrong given name
Võ Nguyên Giáp (VO<<NGUYEN<GIAP)	Võ	Nguyên Giáp	Nguyen Giap **Vo** (Vo, Nguyen Giap)	Giap **Vo Nguyen** (Vo Nguyen, Giap) => wrong surname
Trần Lê Quốc Toàn (TRAN<<LE<QUOC<TOAN)	Trần	Lê Quốc Toàn	Le Quoc Toan **Tran** (Tran, Le Quoc Toan)	Toan Le Quoc **Tran** (Tran, Toan Le Quoc) => wrong given name
Trần Lê Quốc Toàn (TRAN<<LE<QUOC<TOAN)	Trần	Lê Quốc Toàn	Le Quoc Toan **Tran** (Tran, Le Quoc Toan)	Quoc Toan Le **Tran** (Tran, Quoc Toan Le) => wrong given name
Trần Lê Quốc Toàn (TRAN<<LE<QUOC<TOAN)	Trần	Lê Quốc Toàn	Le Quoc Toan **Tran** (Tran, Le Quoc Toan)	Toan **Tran Le Quoc** (Tran Le Quoc, Toan) => wrong surname
Trần Lê Quốc Toàn (TRAN<<LE<QUOC<TOAN)	Trần	Lê Quốc Toàn	Le Quoc Toan **Tran** (Tran, Le Quoc Toan)	Quoc Toan **Tran Le** (Tran Le, Quoc Toan) => wrong surname
Trần Lê Quốc Toàn (TRAN<<LE<QUOC<TOAN)	Trần	Lê Quốc Toàn	Le Quoc Toan **Tran** (Tran, Le Quoc Toan)	Toan Quoc **Tran Le** (Tran Le, Toan Quoc) => wrong both surname and given name
Đỗ Quang Vinh (DO<<QUANG<VINH)	Đỗ	Quang Vinh	Quang Vinh **Do** (Do, Quang Vinh)	Vinh Quang **Do** (Do, Vinh Quang) => wrong given name, confusing with his brother Đỗ Vinh Quang
Đỗ Quang Vinh (DO<<QUANG<VINH)	Đỗ	Quang Vinh	Quang Vinh **Do** (Do, Quang Vinh)	Vinh **Do Quang** (Do Quang, Vinh) => wrong surname, being different with his brother
Đỗ Vinh Quang (DO<<VINH<QUANG)	Đỗ	Vinh Quang	Vinh Quang **Do** (Do, Vinh Quang)	Quang Vinh **Do** (Do, Quang Vinh) => wrong given name, confusing with his brother Đỗ Quang Vinh
Đỗ Vinh Quang (DO<<VINH<QUANG)	Đỗ	Vinh Quang	Vinh Quang **Do** (Do, Vinh Quang)	Quang **Do Vinh** (Do Vinh, Quang) => wrong surname, being different with his brother

=== Mistaking the Vietnamese primary name for a "middle name" and abbreviating or omitting it during reversal ===
A common issue occurs when English speakers are referring Vietnamese full name in Western order: English speakers usually apply the 3-part format "First Middle Last" instead of 2-part format "First Last" or "Given-name Surname" for every personal name without considering the structure of the original name. And as parts of the Vietnamese given name are usually split by spaces, the original primary name (especially the last syllable) is often mistakenly treated as a "middle name" in English form and abbreviated or omitted, while the original padding name is often mistakenly treated as a "first name" and remained in full. For example:

- After "Lê Quang Liêm" was reversed to "Quang Liem LE", many English speakers mistakenly assume that the primary name "Liem" is a "middle name" and abbreviate it as "Quang L. LE" or even omit it entirely, resulting in "Quang LE".
- After "Nguyễn Ngọc Trường Sơn" was reversed to "Ngoc Truong Son NGUYEN", many English speakers mistakenly assume that primary name "Truong Son" is a "middle name" and abbreviate it as "Ngoc T. S. NGUYEN" or even omit it entirely, resulting in "Ngoc NGUYEN".

Such abbreviation or omission should be avoided for Vietnamese personal names. The primary name ("Quang Liêm", "Trường Sơn" in the example above), especially the last syllable ("Liêm", "Sơn") is the most important part by which Vietnamese people are commonly addressed, so it should remain in its full form. Omitting or abbreviating original primary name can make it difficult for Vietnamese people to recognize themselves. And as mentioned above, Vietnamese people do not have middle names in the English sense. The padding name which is at the middle, as well as the earlier syllable ("Quang", "Ngọc" or "Ngọc Trường") is never used independently or used with surname ("Lê", "Nguyễn") when addressing.

Traditional Vietnamese full names usually contain a maximum of four syllables, so they are generally not considered very long when spoken. However, in cases where they are considered too long due to having more than two words and need to be displayed in a shortened form in Western order, the recommended approach is to retain the original primary name in full whenever possible. If shortening is necessary, at least the final syllable of the primary name (which appears before the surname after reversal) should be retained in full, while the original padding name and earlier syllables of the primary name may be abbreviated or omitted. This practice is similar to that of some Western people who use their middle name mainly instead of first name when being addressed, such as Paul McCartney (full name James Paul McCartney), or Gordon Brown (full name James Gordon Brown). For example:

- If it is necessary to retain both the surname and at least part of the given name:

Vietnamese name	Western order	Recommended short form	Not recommended short form
Lê Quang Liêm	Quang Liem LE	Q. Liem LE (Liem LE)	Quang L. LE (Quang LE)
Nguyễn Ngọc Trường Sơn	Ngoc Truong Son NGUYEN	N. Truong Son NGUYEN (Truong Son NGUYEN); N. T. Son NGUYEN (Son NGUYEN)	Ngoc T. S. NGUYEN (Ngoc NGUYEN); Ngoc Truong S. NGUYEN (Ngoc Truong NGUYEN)

- If the surname is omitted:

Vietnamese name	Western order	Recommended short form	Not recommended short form
Lê Quang Liêm	Quang Liem LE	Quang Liem (formal); Q. Liem / Liem	Quang L. / Quang
Nguyễn Ngọc Trường Sơn	Ngoc Truong Son NGUYEN	N. Truong Son / Truong Son (formal); N. T. Son / Son	Ngoc T. S / Ngoc; Ngoc Truong S. / Ngoc Truong

Additionally, where the context permits, using hyphens (-) to connect monosyllables of original given name such as "Quang-Liem Le" and "Ngoc-Truong-Son Nguyen" can be an effective way to prevent the primary name from being omitted in English, similar to the convention commonly used for South Korean and Taiwanese personal names.

== See also ==
- Surname
- Other similar naming systems:
  - Korean name
  - Chinese name
  - Japanese name
- List of common Vietnamese surnames
- List of common Chinese surnames
- List of Korean surnames
- List of common Japanese surnames
- List of most common surnames
