= List of religious flags of Vietnam =

The following is a list of flags used by the various religious communities that inhabit the country of Vietnam.

== Five-color and festival flags ==
List of Vietnamese five-colour, or festival flags, those that incorporate imagery of other religions are listed at their specific sections.

Image	Type of flag	Descriptions
	A popular variation of Vietnamese five-color flags.	In Vietnamese culture, five-colour flags (Vietnamese: cờ ngũ sắc, Chữ Hán: 旗五色) or five elements flags (cờ ngũ hành, Chữ Hán: 旗五行) are traditionally flown during festivals and religious ceremonies. A five-colour flag consists of five concentric squares in red, green, yellow, and blue, representing the five elements (ngũ hành, Chữ Hán: 五行). The order of colours varies. The outermost square has three ragged edges, similar to fringing. The centre of the flag is sometimes defaced to commemorate a specific concept or personality. Historically, some imperial and military ensigns followed a similar pattern.
	Variant Vietnamese five-colour flag.	
Others
	Thần (神) flag.	A Vietnamese five-colour flag with the yellow "神" character. Influences:
	Flag of Thánh Trần. (Note: Unofficial flag that was at times used by the armed forces of South Vietnam.)	Flag ratio is 2:2.
	Funeral flag.	
	Mourning flag.	
	Golden dragon variant.	A Vietnamese five-colour flag with a golden dragon. Influences:
	Festival flag of the Triều Châu Assembly Hall, Hội An.	

=== Family name flags ===
The family flag (Cờ họ tộc) is considered one of the most sacred symbols of a family, symbolising the spirit, will, affection and strength of the family's unity. Family flags are typically hung in front of or inside of space near roads, at temples, family mausoleums, and on the occasions of death, an anniversary, and the Tết Nguyên Đán holiday. Most of the family flags are designed based on the structural principles of the traditional five-colour flag, with the square in the same red colour, and in its centre the family name (surname) is typically written in Chinese script in the colour yellow. The most common style of writing the family name is in Khải thư, but in cases when the character is featured on both sides of the flag the obverse side typically features Khải thư while the reverse side typically features Chữ Triện. Not all family flags maintain the five-colour scheme of traditional flags as some only feature 4 colours.

Image	Type of flag	Descriptions
Five-colour surname flags (Cờ họ tộc)
	Bùi (裴) surname flag (Cờ họ Bùi).	A Vietnamese five-colour flag with the Chữ Hán "裴". Influences:
	Đặng (鄧) surname flag (Cờ họ Đặng).	A Vietnamese five-colour flag with the Chữ Hán "鄧族". Influences:
	Dương (楊) surname flag (Cờ họ Dương).	A Vietnamese five-colour flag with the Chữ Hán "楊" and the Latin letters "Họ Dương Việt Nam". Influences:
	Lưu (劉) surname flag (Cờ họ Lưu).	A Vietnamese five-colour flag with the Chữ Hán "劉". Influences:
	Lý (李) surname flag (Cờ họ Lý).	A Vietnamese five-colour flag with the Chữ Hán "李". Influences:
	Ngô (吳) surname flag (Cờ họ Ngô).	A Vietnamese five-colour flag with the Chữ Hán "吳". Influences:
	Ngô (吳) surname flag (Cờ họ Ngô).	A Vietnamese five-colour flag with the Latin letters "Gia Tộc Họ Ngô". Influences:
	Phạm (范) surname flag (Cờ họ Phạm).	A Vietnamese five-colour flag with the Chữ Hán "范". Influences:
	Phùng (馮) surname flag (Cờ họ Phùng).	A Vietnamese five-colour flag with the Chữ Hán "馮". Influences:
	Trần (陳) surname flag (Cờ họ Trần).	A Vietnamese five-colour flag with the Chữ Hán "陳". Influences:
	Vũ / Võ (武) surname flag (Cờ họ Vũ / Võ).	A Vietnamese five-colour flag with the Chữ Hán "武". Influences:

== Taoist flags ==
=== Five elements flags ===
Image	Type of flag	Descriptions
	Green flag for the element wood and direction east. (Note: The colour green might have at times have been replaced with the colour blue, for the Far Eastern languages originally made no distinction between these colours. Blue flags may have been changed by age and/or weather making them violet.)	
	Red flag for the element fire and direction south.	
	White flag for the element metal and direction west.	
	Black flag for the element water and direction north.	
	Yellow flag for the element earth and direction centre.	

=== Taoist temple flags ===
Image	Type of flag	Descriptions
	Festival flag of the Quán Thánh Temple, Hanoi.	Influences:
	Fanion of the Quán Thánh Temple, Hanoi.	Influences:

== Buddhist flags ==
Image	Type of flag	Descriptions
	Flag of the Buddhist Sangha of Vietnam and the Unified Buddhist Church of Vietnam.	The Buddhist Flag in Vietnam is composed of six vertical strips of equal width. The first five, from left to right, are coloured blue, yellow, red, white, and pink or light orange. The sixth strip is composed of five horizontal strips of equal width, with the same colours and in the same order, from bottom to top. To the Buddhist, each colour signifies a different virtue; but there is no consensus about which colour denotes which virtue. (Note: The five colours of the Vietnamese Buddhist flag signify the five virtues which Buddhists believe vital. While there are differences of opinion as to which colour might represent a particular virtue, the virtues themselves are ideals held before the adherents by the Sangha. These virtues are developed as the adherent follows the Eightfold Middle Path and subdues the 108 desires or cravings which stand between man and Nirvana.)
	Buddhist flag (Vertical variant).	Influences:
	Flag of the Vietnamese Buddhist Youth Association	
	Flag of the Tu Giao Buddhist Association of Vietnam.	
	Flag of the Than Mau Association of Vietnam.	

=== Đạo Hòa Hảo ===
Followers of Hòa Hảo denomination of Buddhism use a plain brown (maroon) flag. The colour of which is of particular importance to the community, because the altars are made by placing a similar brown cloth on the wall to mark the point faced during the prayers as well as the habits of the Hòa Hảo clergy being also brown in colour. In Vietnam, the Hòa Hảo religious flag is usually accompanied with the national Vietnamese flag. Among the Vietnamese diaspora, Hòa Hảo religious flag is typically used together with the pre-1975 flag of South Vietnam and the flag of the United States.

Image	Type of flag	Descriptions
	The flag of the Hòa Hảo religion, introduced in 1939.	Rectangular in shape and solid maroon in colour inasmuch as the Hòa Hảo believe that maroon is the combination of all colours and thus signifies unity of all people, regardless of race, skin colour, or language.
	Military flag of the Hòa Hảo religion.	A brown field with the yellow letters "P.G.H.H.". Influences:
	Military flag of the Hòa Hảo religion.	A white scimitar on a maroon background. Influences:

== Christian flags ==
Image	Type of flag	Descriptions
	The Christian Flag is an ecumenical flag designed in the early 20th century to represent all of Christianity and Christendom. Since its adoption by the United States Federal Council of Churches in 1942, it has been used by many Christian traditions.	The ground is white, representing peace, purity and innocence. In the upper corner is a blue square, the colour of the unclouded sky, emblematic of heaven, the home of the Christian; also a symbol of faith and trust. in the center of the blue is the cross, the ensign and chosen symbol of Christianity: the cross is red, typical of Christ's blood.

=== Catholic flags ===
Vietnamese Catholics have adopted localised symbols such as five-colour flags combined with Christian symbolism.

Image	Type of flag	Descriptions
	Catholic Church flag.	The Roman Catholic Church in Vietnam uses yellow-white horizontal bicolour, the same design is also used by the Roman Catholic Church in Poland, as well as in a number other countries.
	Flag of Vietnamese Eucharistic Youth Association.	
	Catholic Vietnamese five-colours flag.	A Vietnamese five-colour flag with a Latin cross in the middle. Influences:
	Catholic funeral flag.	
	Catholic Holy Week flag.	

=== Other flags ===
Image	Type of flag	Descriptions
	Flag of the Unités Mobiles de Défense des Chrétientés.	The Mobile Units for the Defense of Christians ("Các đơn vị lưu động bảo vệ giáo dân Thiên Chúa giáo /các họ đạo"), centered in Bến Tre, were active from 1947 to 1953.

== Islamic flags ==
At mosques special Islamic flags are flown alongside the national Vietnamese flag. These Muslim flags are typically green in colour with a white crescent and star and is usually hoisted. Generally the shape of charges is the same as the flags that used to decorate the walls of the mosques and they also adorn the peaks of mosque's domes. While generally speaking their colours tend to be green, the star sometimes depicted as gold, which Tomislav Todorović claims is "undoubtedly borrowed from the national [Vietnamese] flag".

Image	Type of flag	Descriptions
	Vietnamese mosque flag.	A green flag with a white crescent and star. Influences:
	Vietnamese mosque flag (Vertical variant).	A green flag with a white crescent and star. Influences:
	Vietnamese mosque flag (Variant with device pointed toward fly).	A green flag with a white crescent and star. Influences:
	Vietnamese mosque flag (Variant with device pointed toward corner).	A green flag with a white crescent and star. Influences:

== Caodaism flags ==
Image	Type of flag	Descriptions
	The banner of the Đạo Cao Đài.	A vertical tricolour with the colours yellow-blue-red. The top (yellow) field contains the blue Chữ Hán Đại Đạo Tam Kỳ Phổ Độ (大道三期普度, "The Great Faith [for the] Third Universal Redemption") written from right-to-left. The middle (blue) field contains the Eye of Providence, under the Divine Eye is the religious emblem which also represents the essence of the three religions; the bowl of charity for Buddhist compassion and asceticism, the feather duster for Daoist purification; the Spring and Autumn Annals for Confucianist virtue and love.
	Banner of the Cao Đài Holy See, Tây Ninh.	
	Cao Đài funeral flag.	
	Variant Cao Đài flag.	
	Flag of the Caodaist Youth Union.	
