= Hoang Tich Chu =

Hoang Tich Chu may refer to:

- Hoàng Tích Chu (1897–1933) Vietnamese journalist
- Hoàng Tích Chù (1912–2003) Vietnamese painter
