= 權 =

權 may refer to:

- Quan, Chinese surname
- Kwon, Korean surname
- Quyen (name), Vietnamese surname
