= Nguyen Van Hung =

Nguyen Van Hung may refer to:

== Nguyễn Văn Hùng ==
- Peter Nguyen Van Hung (born 1958), Vietnamese Australian Catholic priest and human rights activist
- Nguyễn Văn Hùng (martial artist) (born 1980), Vietnamese martial artist and pro basketball player
- Nguyễn Văn Hùng (athlete) (born 1989), Vietnamese triple jumper
- Nguyễn Văn Hùng (politician) (born 1961), Vietnamese politician, Minister of Culture, Sports and Tourism

== Nguyễn Văn Hưng ==
- Nguyễn Văn Hưng (born 1958), Vietnamese general and member of the National Assembly
