= Le (surname) =

Le is a romanization of several East Asian surnames and a common Vietnamese surname.

It is a fairly common surname in the United States, ranked 975th during the 1990 census and 368th during the 2000 census. In 2000, it was the eighth-most-common surname among America's Asian and Pacific Islander population, predominantly from its Vietnamese use. It was also reported among the top 200 surnames in Ontario, Canada, based on a survey of that province's Registered Persons Database of Canadian health card recipients as of the year 2000.

== Origins of surname ==
Spelling and Pronunciation of Lê in Vietnamese
Spelling and Pronunciation of Lê

=== Vietnamese ===
Lê is a common Vietnamese surname (third most common), written 黎 in Chữ Hán. It is pronounced /le˧˧/ in the Hanoi dialect and /lej˧˧/ in the Saigon dialect, similar to English lay. It is usually pronounced /liː/ (LEE) in English, with it being commonly mistaken for another surname, with similar spelling and pronunciation in English, Lý.

=== Chinese ===
Mandarin

Le is the Pinyin romanization of the Chinese surname (written 乐 in Simplified Chinese characters and 樂 in Traditional Chinese characters); it is Lok in Cantonese.

Lí is the Pinyin romanization of the Chinese surname 黎

==== Minnan ====
Lê or Le is the POJ romanization of the Chinese surname Li (黎, Lí).

==== Cantonese ====
黎 is Lai4 in Cantonese.

== People with the surname ==
=== Vietnamese ===
Lê

- Anterior Lê dynasty
- The Lê dynasty
- Lê Công Vinh, football player
- Lê Hoàn, founding emperor of the Anterior Lê dynasty
- Dinh Q Lê
- Lê Duẩn
- Lê Đức Anh
- Lê Dũng Tráng, Vietnamese-French mathematician
- Dowager Empress Gia Từ, originally of the Lê clan of Vĩnh Lộc District
- Lê Hằng Phấn
- Lê Hồng Phong, General Secretary of the Communist Party of Vietnam
- Lê Huỳnh Đức, football player
- Lê Khả Phiêu
- Lê Lâm Quỳnh Như, Vietnamese-American singer known as Như Quỳnh
- Lê Lợi, founding emperor of the Lê dynasty
- Nguyên Lê
- Lê Minh Đảo
- Lê Nhân Tông
- Lê Quan Ninh, French percussionist
- Lê Quang Liêm, chess player
- Lê Quang Tung, commander of ARVN Special Forces
- Lê Quý Đôn
- Lê Văn Duyệt, general of Gia Long and viceroy of southern Vietnam
- Lê Văn Hưng
- Lê Văn Khôi, adopted son of Le Van Duyet
- Lê Văn Thiêm
- Lê Thái Tông, second emperor of the Lê dynasty
- Lê Thanh Đạo, North Vietnamese fighter pilot
- Lê Thánh Tông, fifth emperor of the Lê dynasty
- Lê Tuấn Hùng
- Lê Trọng Tấn, general, Chief of General Staff of the Vietnam People's Army, Deputy Minister of National Defense of Vietnam
- Lê Long Đĩnh, the last emperor of the Anterior Lê dynasty

Le

- Annie Le
- Cung Le (born 1972), Vietnamese-born American martial artist
- Duy-Loan Le
- Hoang Le
- Linda Le, Vietnamese-American cosplayer and model
- Michelle Le
- Minh Le
- Tony Le-Nguyen
- Thuy Thu Le
- Tuan Le
- Danny "Shiphtur" Le, Canadian League of Legends player
- Aleks Le, Vietnamese-American voice actor
- Le brothers, Vietnamese-American filmmakers

=== Chinese ===
- Le Jingyi, a former swimmer from China who won the gold medal in the 100 meters freestyle at the 1996 Summer Olympics in Atlanta, USA

=== Other ===
- Nhi Le (born 1995) German journalist, speaker, discussion moderator and author.
- Tamara Le, American politician

== See also ==
- Le (disambiguation)
- Lí (黎)
- Lee (Korean surname)
