= Tôn =

Tôn (孫) (Anglicised as Ton) is a Vietnamese surname. It is transliterated as Sun in Chinese and Son in Korean.

== Notable people ==
- Tôn Đức Thắng (1888–1980), first President of the Socialist Republic of Vietnam
- Tôn Hiếu Anh (fl. 1994–present), Vietnamese model

== See also ==
- Tôn Thất, a Vietnamese compound surname
- Nguyễn Văn Tồn (1763–1820), Vietnamese general
- Phạm Duy Tốn (1881–1924), Vietnamese writer
- Trương Ngọc Tơn (born 1960), Vietnamese swimmer
