= Shui =

Shui may refer to:

- Shui people, or Sui people, ethnic group living in southwestern China
- Shui language, or Sui language, spoken by the Shui people
- Shui (surname) (水), a Chinese surname
- Shui (rhetorical term), a term from Chinese formal rhetoric
- SHUI - firmware for 3D printers
