= Trịnh =

Trịnh is a Vietnamese family name. It exists in equivalent forms in other languages of the Sinosphere such as (鄭, Zheng, Cheng) in Chinese and Korean (Jeong, Chung).

Families that bear the surname Trịnh are exclusively Vietnamese. The surname further proliferated following the reign of the Trịnh lords in Tonkin.

== Notable people ==
- Trịnh lords, A noble feudal clan that wielded de facto power in Northern Vietnam between the 16th-18th centuries. Opposed the Nguyễn lords of Southern Vietnam through a series of civil wars.
- Trịnh Công Sơn, Vietnamese musician
- Eugene Huu Chau Trinh, the first Vietnamese-American astronaut
- Trịnh Như Khuê, First Cardinal of the Catholic Church of Vietnam, Archbishop of Archdiocese of Hanoi
- Trịnh Văn Căn, Second Cardinal of Catholic Church of Vietnam, Archbishop of Archdiocese of Hanoi
- Trinh Xuan Thuan, Big Bang theorist/scientist
- Trinh T. Minh-ha, Filmmaker
- François Trinh-Duc, French rugby union player of Vietnamese descent
- Trang Trịnh, Vietnamese pianist

== See also ==
- Jeong (surname)
- Zheng (surname)
- Nguyen (surname)
