= Tôn Nữ Thị Ninh =

Vietnamese diplomat and educator (born 1947)

Madame Tôn Nữ Thị Ninh
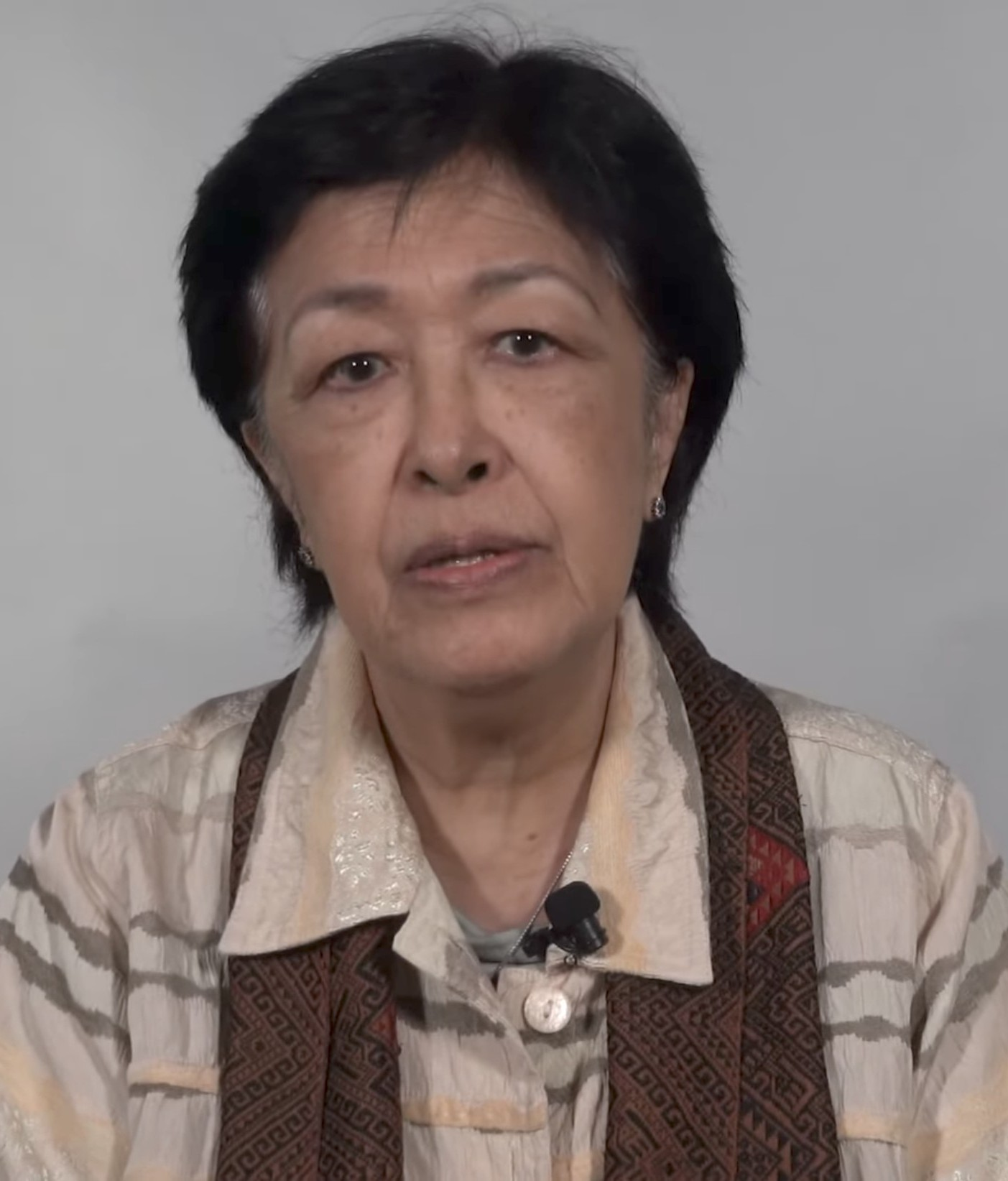
- Ninh in 2022

Deputy Chair of the National Assembly Foreign Affairs Committee
- In office 2002–2007
- Committee Chair: Vũ Mão
- Preceded by: Đỗ Văn Tài
- Succeeded by: Ngô Đức Mạnh

Member of the National Assembly
- In office 2002–2007
- Chair: Nguyễn Văn An; Nguyễn Phú Trọng
- Constituency: Bà Rịa-Vũng Tàu

Ambassador of Vietnam to Belgium and Luxembourg
- In office 2000–2003

Head of the Vietnamese Delegation to the European Union
- In office 2000–2003
- Foreign Minister: Nguyễn Dy Niên

Personal details
- Born: 30 October 1947 (age 79) Thừa Thiên-Huế Province, Vietnam
- Party: Independent
- Other political affiliations: National Liberation Front (1968-1976)
- Relations: Nguyễn dynasty
- Education: Marie Curie High School; Université de Paris; University of Cambridge
- Awards: Legion of Honour (third rank)

Tôn Nữ Thị Ninh (born October 30, 1947) is a Vietnamese diplomat, politician and educator. She served as the Vietnamese Ambassador to the European Union and other European nations such as Belgium and Luxembourg. A member of the National Assembly from 2002 to 2007, she also served as the Deputy Chair of the Foreign Affairs Committee.

== Early life and education ==
Tôn Nữ Thị Ninh was born on October 30, 1947, in Huế city, Thừa Thiên-Huế province, Vietnam. Because she was a descendant of the royal Nguyen dynasty, her surname is "Tôn Nữ" (it is same as a male descendant of Nguyen dynasty who is named "Tôn Thất").

In 1950, her family moved to France and then came back to Saigon, where she attended the Marie Curie High School. In 1964, she attended the Université de Paris and later the University of Cambridge.

== Career ==
=== Early career ===
While being in Paris, she joined the National Liberation Front (Viet Cong), which later became the Provisional Revolutionary Government of South Vietnam, as an assistant and a translator for the Vietnam delegates negotiating at the Paris Peace Accords from 1968 to 1973, especially in the unofficial negotiations of Madame Nguyễn Thị Bình. Ninh used to be a university lecturer at Université Sorbonne-Nouvelle.

After coming back to Vietnam in 1972, she became the Associate Dean of the English Faculty of the Saigon University of Education (now the Ho Chi Minh City Pedagogical University).

In 1975, when she was at the Saigon University of Education, Ninh met the Chair of the Central Foreign Affairs Committee of the Communist Party of Vietnam and accepted his invitation to work at the Committee, formally ending her teaching career in 1979.

=== Diplomatic career ===
She began her career as an interpreter for figures such as Vietnamese Prime Minister Pham Van Dong, General Vo Nguyen Giap, and French President Francois Mitterrand.

She later held the positions of Director of the Department of International Organizations of the Ministry of Foreign Affairs and became an Assistant Minister of Foreign Affairs. She has played an important role in Vietnam's participation in multilateral organizations, particularly its entry to the World Trade Organization.

In 2000, Madame Ninh was appointed the Ambassador of Vietnam to EU, Belgium and Luxembourg. In 2002, she was elected to the National Assembly, where she served as the Deputy Chair of the Foreign Affairs Committee until 2007.

=== Later career ===
After her retirement from politics, she involved in the creation of the University of Trí Việt, a private non-profit institution, and served as its founding President. However, the project is considered a failure by Ninh herself.

She was the Vice President of Vietnam Peace Committee, President of the Ho Chi Minh City Peace Committee, and a member of Council of Leaders for Peace. Madame Ninh has also served as the president of the Ho Chi Minh City Peace and Development Foundation. She's currently focusing on the socio-cultural sphere, working to promote Vietnam's sustainable development, empowerment of women and youth, and contribute to Vietnam's more effective international integration and national branding.

She has published a book called Tư duy và chia sẻ.

== Political positions ==
In 2016, she expressed disapproval over the appointment of Bob Kerrey as the chairman of the board of trustees for Fulbright University Vietnam. In her letter to the editors of The New York Times, she wrote: "While Mr. Kerry has expressed remorse over his role in the Thanh Phong massacre, a leadership position at a university with the status and ambitions of FUV, a joint American-Vietnamese venture set to start up in the fall of 2017, should not be viewed as an opportunity to atone for past wrongdoings. That opportunity can take other, uncontroversial forms".

== Awards ==
In 1997, Madame Ninh was awarded the second rank (officier) of the Legion of Honour after the Hanoi-French Summit. In 2013, she received the third rank (commander) of the Legion of Honors.

== Personal life ==
Tôn Nữ Thị Ninh has been married to a lecturer at the Ho Chi Minh City Pedagogical University since 1982.
