= Yún (surname) =

Yun
- The small seal script character for Yun
- Pronunciation: [y̌n] (IPA); Yún (Pinyin); Yün^{2} (Wade–Giles); Wan^{4} (Jyutping); hûn / ûn / în (Pe̍h-ōe-jī)
- Language: Chinese

Origin
- Language: Old Chinese
- Meaning: cloud

Other names
- Derivatives: Yun (Mandarin); Wan (Cantonese); Woon, Hoon, Hung, Wun, Yun, Yung (Hokkien/Teochew); Vân (Vietnamese); Woon, Wun, Whun, Kuhn (운) (Korean)

Yun (traditional Chinese: 雲; simplified Chinese: 云; pinyin: Yún) is a Chinese surname, listed 41st in the Song dynasty classic text Hundred Family Surnames.

The Chinese surname Yun (雲) may be confused with the common Korean surname Yun (윤) which instead derives from the Chinese character 尹 (yǐn), meaning "governor".

== Origin ==
Very few outside cognates of Old Chinese *[ɢ]ʷən (Baxter-Sagart) exist. Starostin compares it with Mizo vân ('sky, the skies, heaven') and Karbi inghun ('cloud'). It could possibly derive from a root meaning 'to revolve'. Compare 運 (OC *[ɢ]ʷər-s, 'to move'), 回 (OC *[ɢ]ʷˤəj, 'to whirl, to circle') (Schuessler, 2007). OC *[ɢ]ʷˤəj bears striking similarities to Ket -ga (Proto-Yenisseian *gaj).

== Distribution ==
Yun is a rare surname, being the 323rd most common surname in China and shared among 156,000 people as of 2013.

=== Tumeds ===
Yun is the surname of many Tümeds, a Chinese-speaking Mongol ethnic group. Some Tumeds claim getting "Yun" surname at ancient times. However, adoption of the surname greatly increased during the 1920s, and especially after the 1949 revolution, which increased Mongols' access to education. Mongolian names in the Mongolian language generally do not contain surnames, so Mongols chose surnames when registering for Chinese elementary school. In those schools, adoption of the Yun surname became a social norm for Tumeds, who are largely endogamous. The most famous Tumed with the surname "Yun" was Ulanhu (Chinese: 雲澤; pinyin: Yúnzé), chairman of Inner Mongolia (1947–1966) and Vice President of China (1983–1988). During the 1980s and 1990s, the "Yun family" was identified with the dominant "West Mongol" (Tumed) faction in the Inner Mongolian government. The other two factions were that of the "East Mongols" (Khorchin tribe) and the Inner Mongolian Han. The perceived nepotism among the Yun family in Ulanhu's government was a frequent object of satire by government critics. According to anthropologist Uradyn Bulag,

One story tells that when someone went to the Inner Mongolian government building and shouted, "Lao [senior] Yun!" almost half of the office windows were opened. Realizing his mistake, the person shouted, "Xiao [junior] Yun!"; the other half of the windows then opened.... A similar story is that there were so many Yuns seeking to attend Ulahu's funeral in Beijing that it became difficult to buy train tickets.

== Notable Chinese people ==
=== Historical figures ===
- Yun Dingxing (雲定興), Sui dynasty general

=== Modern figures ===
- Ulanhu (1906–1988), also known as Yun Ze (雲澤), Chinese general who served as former Vice President of the People's Republic of China (1983–1988)
- Yun Bulong (雲布龍; 1937–2000), Chinese former Chairman of Inner Mongolia (1998–2000)
- Yun Damian (雲大棉; born 1935), Chinese politician, member of the 8th and 9th CPPCC National Committees
- Hoon Thien How (雲天豪; born 1986), Malaysian badminton player
- Daniel Yun, Film maker and writer.
- Woon Tai Ho (雲大篪, born 1958), Hainamese TV producer

=== Fictional characters ===
- Yun Jin (雲堇), fictional character from the video game Genshin Impact
- Wan Fei Yeung (雲飛揚), protagonist of the 1979 Hong Kong TV series Reincarnated
- Yun, a supporting character of the two novels of Avatar Kyoshi, in which he was mistaken to be the next Earth Avatar for sixteen long years.
- Yun Jingyi, the Chinese name of Dr. Joan Watson in the TV series Elementary.
