= Sun (surname) =

Chinese surname

孙/孫
- Sun in seal script

Other names
- Variant forms: Suen (Hong Kong and regions with Cantonese-speaking populations), Sen (Amoy dialect), Sng (Teochew dialect), Tôn (Vietnamese), Son (Japanese/Korean), Soon (regions with Hokkien-speaking populations), Soon/Suan/-son/-zon (Chinese Filipino in the Philippines), and Swen.
- Related names: Gongsun

Sun (/sʊn/) is a transliteration of a common Chinese surname (simplified Chinese: 孙; traditional Chinese: 孫; pinyin: Sūn; Yale romanization: Swēn; pronounced [swə́n]). It is the third name listed in the Song dynasty classic text Hundred Family Surnames.

Other transliterations include Suen (Hong Kong and regions with Cantonese-speaking populations), Soon (Amoy dialect), Sng and Soon (Teochew dialect), Tôn (Vietnamese), Son (Japanese/Korean), Soon (regions with Hokkien-speaking populations), Sen/Suan/-son/-zon (Chinese Filipino in the Philippines), and Swen.

In 2019, Sun was the twelfth most common surname in mainland China. A 2013 study found it to be the 12th most common name as well, shared by 18,300,000 people or 1.38% of the population, with the province with the most being Shandong.

Note that in Hong Kong and regions with Cantonese-speaking populations, the surname Xin (辛) is also transliterated as Sun.

== Origins ==
- The name Sunshu Ao (孫叔敖) comes from the surname Wei (蔿), from Yuan (薳) in Chu
  - Sun Shu (孫叔), the style name of Sunshu Ao, an official in Chu during the Spring and Autumn period His descendants part of the style mame nas their surname.
- Hui Sun (惠孫), style name of the son of Wei Wu Gong Hui Sun's grandson later inherited 孫 as his surname.
- Sun Shu (孫書), an official in the Qi, was given the name by Duke Jing of Qi because of his contributions in the war between the state of Qi and the state of Lü. Notable descendants through this line include Sun Tzu
- People with the surname Xun (荀). changed it to 孫 during the reign of Liu Xun (劉恂), also known as Emperor Xuan of Han, because it had the same pronunciation as the given name of the emperor (in Old Chinese). After the death of Han Xuan Di, some people kept the surname, while others changed it back to their original.

== Notable people ==
=== Historical figures (in chronological order) ===
- Gongsun Xuanyuan, known as Yellow Emperor
- Sun Tzu (544 – 496 BC) – a militarist in the Spring and Autumn period, the author of The Art of War.
- Sun Yang (Bole) – a horse physiognomer of the Spring and Autumn period.
- Sun Bin (a.k.a. Sun Tzu, Sunzi, died 316 BC) – a militarist in the Warring States period and descendant of Sun Tzu.
- Sun Cheng (died 132)
- Sun Jing (孫敬) – 2nd-century native of Xindu, Zhili, who was such an ardent student that at night he always tied his hair to a beam overhead, to prevent himself from dozing over his books. He also habitually bolted the door of his study to keep out intruders.
- Sun Jian (155–191), Han dynasty military general and warlord
- Lady Sun, sister of Sun Jian
- Sun Ce (175–200), Han dynasty warlord
- Sun Quan (182–252), founding emperor of the Eastern Wu state in the Three Kingdoms period
- Sun Liang (243–260), second emperor of Eastern Wu
- Sun Xiu (235–264), third emperor of Eastern Wu
- Sun Hao (242–284), fourth and last emperor of Eastern Wu
- Lady Sun, Sun Jian's daughter
  - see also Eastern Wu family trees
- Sun Shao (163–225), first chancellor of the Eastern Wu state in the Three Kingdoms period
- Sun Qian, official serving under the Han dynasty warlord Liu Bei
- Sun Kang (孫康; 4th century) – A native of Luoyang, who in his youth was so poor that he could not afford a lamp to read by. He therefore studied in winter by light reflected from the snow, and ultimately rose to be a Censor.
- Sun Sheng (4th century) – a Chinese historian.
- Sun Tzu (a.k.a. Sunzi; fl. 4th century) – mathematician famous for the Chinese remainder theorem.
- Sun Chuo (320–377) – a poet of the Six Dynasties poetry tradition.
- Sun En (died 402) – leader of a rebellion against the Jin dynasty.
- Sun Simiao (581–682)- a traditional Chinese medicine physician of the Sui and Tang dynasties.
- Sun Yuanheng (died 696)
- Sun Shi (962–1033) – a native of Po-p'ing in Shandong, who graduated as jinshi after nine attempts and entered the public service, rising to high office under the Emperor Cheu Tseung. In 1008 there was a pretended revelation from God in the form of a letter, which the Emperor and his Court regarded with profound awe. But Sun Shi said, "I have heard that God does not speak; how then should He write a letter?"
- Sun Changru (孫長孺) – a scholar of the Song dynasty, noted for his vast collection of books, which earned for him the sobriquet of Library Sun. In 1015 he was made magistrate of Xunzhou in Guangxi, and subsequently rose to an important office in the household of the Heir Apparent.
- Sun Fang (12th century) – An imperial physician, who called himself the Hermit of the Four Stops. He explained this to mean that when he had taken his fill of plain food, he stopped; when he had put on enough plain clothes to keep himself warm, he stopped; when he had realized a fair proportion of his wishes, he stopped; and that after growing old, free from covetousness or envy, he would also be prepared to stop.
- Sun Qifeng (1583–1675) – a Confucian scholar.
- Sun Chuanting (1593–1643) – a Chinese Field Marshal.
- Sun Sike (died 1700) – a Chinese Bannerman, noted for his successes against the Oelots, against the Shensi rebels in 1675–79, and against Galdan. He rose to be a general, and was ennobled as Baron.

=== Military and government ===
- Sun Kaihua (died 1893) – a Chinese general in the Battle of Tamsui.
- Sun Jiagan (1683–1753) – a Qing dynasty Chinese official.
- Sun Shiyi (1720–1796) – a Chinese Viceroy.
- Sun Zhizu – a native of Hangzhou, who graduated as jinshi in 1766, and served as a Censor. Author of a work on the discrepancies in the various editions of the famous work by Xiao Tong; and also of a hostile criticism on the Kongzi Jiayu.
- Sun Xingyan (1752–1818) – A native of Jiangsu. From 1795 to 1811 he served with distinction in Shantung, where his honesty was often distasteful to his superiors. He published editions of several Classics and topographies he wrote many classical and antiquarian works; and he discovered the graves of Min Sun, Tantai Mieming, and Zeng Dian, three of the disciples of Confucius.
- Sun Yuting (1752–1834) – a Chinese governor.
- Sun Jiagu – a Qing dynasty envoy.
- Sun Yat-sen (1866–1925) – the founder of the Republic of China.
- Sun Chuanfang (1885–1935) – a Zhili clique warlord.
- Sun Lianzhong (1893–1990) – a general of the Republic of China who fought in the Northern Expedition, Second Sino-Japanese War, World War II and the Chinese Civil War.
- Sun Lih-chyun – spokesperson of Executive Yuan of the Republic of China.
- Sun Li-jen (1900–1990) – a general of the Republic of China who fought in the Second Sino-Japanese War, World War II and the Chinese Civil War.
- Sun Shenglu (1928–1952), Chinese pilot
- Sun Ta-chuan – Vice President of Control Yuan of the Republic of China.
- Sun Te-hsiung – Minister of the Research, Development and Evaluation Commission of the Republic of China (1991–1994).
- Sun Zhengcai (born 1963) – a disgraced Communist Party politician who served as party secretary of Chongqing

=== Other notable people ===
- Michael Suen, the Secretary for Education of Hong Kong
- Jonny Sun, a Canadian author and illustrator
- Sun Honglei, Chinese Actor (Hong Kong) starring in numerous films and TV dramas
- Sun Jihai, a football player from People's Republic of China
- Sun Jiaqi (born 2004), Chinese BMX rider
- Sun Mingming (born 1983), Chinese basketball player
- Sun Nan, a Chinese male singer
- Sun Qian (born 1997), Chinese actress
- Sun Qinglin (born 1974), Chinese artists, member of Yangjiang Group artist collective
- Stefanie Sun, a Singaporean singer-songwriter
- Sun Wei, a Japanese fashion model (of Chinese origin)
- Sun Wen, a football player from the People's Republic of China
- Sun Dong, a football player from the People's Republic of China
- Sun Yang, a world champion swimmer from the People's Republic of China
- Sun Yue (basketball), an NBA basketball player with the Los Angeles Lakers
- Sun Zehao (born 1995), an ice hockey goaltender
- Jónas Sen, an Icelandic/Chinese music critic, composer and pianist (of Chinese origin)
- Masayoshi Son, A Korean-Japanese businessman and the founder and current chief executive officer of SoftBank, the chief executive officer of SoftBank Mobile, and current chairman of Sprint Corporation
- Son Heung-min, Korean footballer and captain of the Tottenham Hotspur Football Club in the English Premier League
- Nike Sun, mathematician
- Dong Sun, a Chinese Scientist and the Secretary for Innovation, Technology and Industry of Hong Kong
- Chris Sun, the Secretary for Labour and Welfare of Hong Kong
- Lulu Sun, Swiss–New Zealand tennis player
- Seraph Sun, a Singaporean actress
- Sun Xueling, a Singaporean politician
- Fei Fei Sun, a Chinese supermodel
- Sun Yiwen, Chinese left-handed épée fencer
- Sun Zhenni, Chinese singer, actress, and member of Chinese idol group SNH48

=== Fictional people ===
- Sun Wukong – the Monkey-King protagonist of Journey to the West
- Son Goku – main character in the Dragon Ball series loosely based on Sun Wukong.
- Grandpa Son Gohan – adoptive grandfather of Son Goku from Dragon Ball.
- Son Gohan – eldest son of Goku from Dragon Ball.
- Son Goten – youngest son of Goku from Dragon Ball.
- Son Pan – Son Goku's granddaughter via Gohan from Dragon Ball.
- Son Goku Jr. – Great-great-grandson of Goku in the anime Dragon Ball GT

== See also ==
- Sun Tzu (disambiguation) (simplified Chinese: 孙子; traditional Chinese: 孫子; pinyin: Sūn Zǐ; lit. 'Master Sun')
