= Shui Junshao =

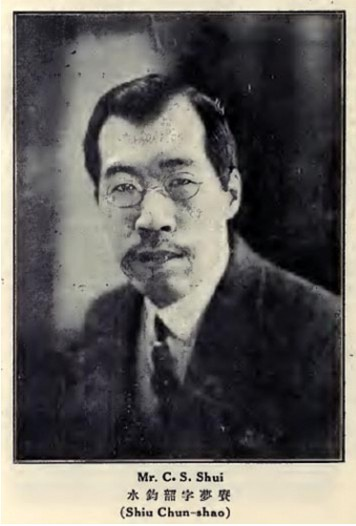
Shui Junshao

Shui Junshao (水鈞韶, 1878 – 25 August 1961), courtesy name Meng Geng, a native of Funing, Jiangsu, was a diplomat from the Republic of China and a member of the old transportation department . He was a member of the Revolutionary Committee of the Chinese Kuomintang. In 1925, he served as the consul general of the Chinese consulate in Leningrad, USSR.
