= Phạm =

Family name

- Pronunciation: International Phonetic Alphabet: Hanoi: [faːm˧˨ʔ]; Saigon: [faːm˨˩˨]
- Language: Vietnamese

Other names
- Variant forms: Fan, Huan, Fam, Hwang, Fung (from Chinese), Beom/Pŏm/Pem (Korean)

Spelling and Pronunciation of Phạm
Spelling and Pronunciation of Phạm

Phạm (范) is the fifth most common Vietnamese family name. It may be rendered as Fàn in Chinese or Beom/Pom/Pem (범) in Korean.

== Origin ==
Phạm is the Sino-Vietnamese reading of the Chữ Hán: 范.

Phạm arose in historical sources from around the third century CE. It was the title prepositions before names of kings of Lâm Ấp, kings of Funan, the eight chiefs of Jiao, and several tribal figures along the Annamite Mountain between the third to the seventh century CE. American historian Michael Vickery (1998) links the reconstructs the pronunciation of 范 as *buam and *bĭwɐm in Early Middle Chinese (c. 650 CE) with Old Khmer title poñ which was recorded in various 7th-century Cambodian inscriptions. Later, a Phạm family emerged on the coastal side of the Red River basin in the 10th century. Vickery argues that the term was certainly of Mon-Khmer (Austroasiatic) origin, and the described demographics associated with the term (*bĭwɐm < *krum ~ prum, krom, khom) are strong linguistic indications of Mon-Khmer. The term is still preserved in few Austroasiatic languages today, such as Temoq *puang (ritualist) ~ puiyang (shaman, + nominalizing infix -iy-) < pauñ < poñ, suggesting a pre-Buddhist native Mon-Khmer institution of leadership who possessed shamanistic ritual and political roles.

== Frequency ==
Among the global ethnic Vietnamese population, it is the fourth-most common name, accounting for 5% of the approximately 75 million people. In the United States, it is shared by around 82,000 citizens. It is the 951st most common surname in France and the 455th most common in Australia.

== See also ==
- Fàn (surname)
- Vietnamese name
