= Shui (surname) =

Shui (水)
- Pronunciation: Shuǐ ([ʂwèɪ]) (Mandarin)
- Language: Chinese

Origin
- Language: Old Chinese
- Meaning: "water"

Shui is the Mandarin pinyin and Wade–Giles romanization of the Chinese surname written 水 in Chinese character. It is listed 38th in the Song dynasty classic text Hundred Family Surnames. Shui is not among the 400 most common surnames in China. It is the 38th name on the Hundred Family Surnames poem.

== Notable people ==
- Shui Hua (水华; 1916–1995), film director
- Shui Junshao (水鈞韶; 1878–1961), Republic of China diplomat
- Shui Junyi (水均益; born 1963), journalist and television presenter, grandson of Shui Zi
- Shui Qingxia (水庆霞; born 1966), member of the Chinese women's football team, Olympic silver medalist
- Shui Zi (水梓; 1884–1973), educator and politician
