= Quyen (name) =

Quyen (Vietnamese pronunciation: [kwēēn˨˩]) is the Anglicised spelling of a Vietnamese surname (Quyền) as well as various Vietnamese given names (Quyên, Quyễn, Quyền).

== Surname ==
The Vietnamese surname Quyền, meaning "power" or "right", is cognate with the Chinese surname (權) now spelled Quán in Mandarin Pinyin. People with this surname include:

- Quyền Văn Minh (born 1954), Vietnamese jazz saxophonist

== Given names ==
Quyen:

- Quyen T. Nguyen, American surgeon
- Quyen Tran, American cinematographer

Quyên:

- Hoàng Quyên (born 1992), Vietnamese singer

Quyễn:

- Nguyễn Quyễn (born 1952), Vietnamese long-distance runner

Quyền:

- Ngô Quyền (897–944), Ngô dynasty king
- Nguyễn Quyền (1869–1941), Vietnamese anti-colonial activist
