= Vũ =

Vũ - Võ (武) Vietnamese Five Colors Flag

Vũ (武) or Võ is a common Vietnamese surname that, through genealogy records, has been present in Vietnam since the 9th century. The Vũ surname originates from general Wǔ Hún (武渾) of the Tang Dynasty in Imperial China who was appointed governor of the Annan Protectorate (Northern Vietnam). Vũ and Võ both refer to military service, the art of fighting, or ferocity, as per meaning of 武.

Vũ is primarily used by Vietnamese who live in the north, while Võ mostly is used by Vietnamese who live in the south (from Quảng Bình Province to the south), but not always strictly so, as either Võ or Vũ can be found north or south. The number of people with the surname Vũ is the 7th most common with 3.9% of the population in Vietnam.

== History ==
It is believed that the Vũ family first originated in the Mộ Trạch village, Bình Giang district, Hải Dương province, Northern Vietnam. However, not all Vũ families in Hải Dương and Vietnam have the same origin from here. According to genealogy records and the family tree in Mộ Trạch village, the ancestor of the Vũ family was Vũ Hồn (804–853), a governor the Tang Dynasty appointed to rule the Annan Protectorate (modern day Northern Vietnam). There is currently a temple in Mộ Trạch village, Hải Dương province dedicated to Vũ Hồn and the Vũ family.

Later on, starting from the south of Gianh River to the end of the southern provinces, to avoid the naming taboo of Lord Nguyễn Phúc Khoát (titled Vũ Vương), "Vũ" was changed to "Võ".

== Lord Vũ's Imperial Dynasty ==
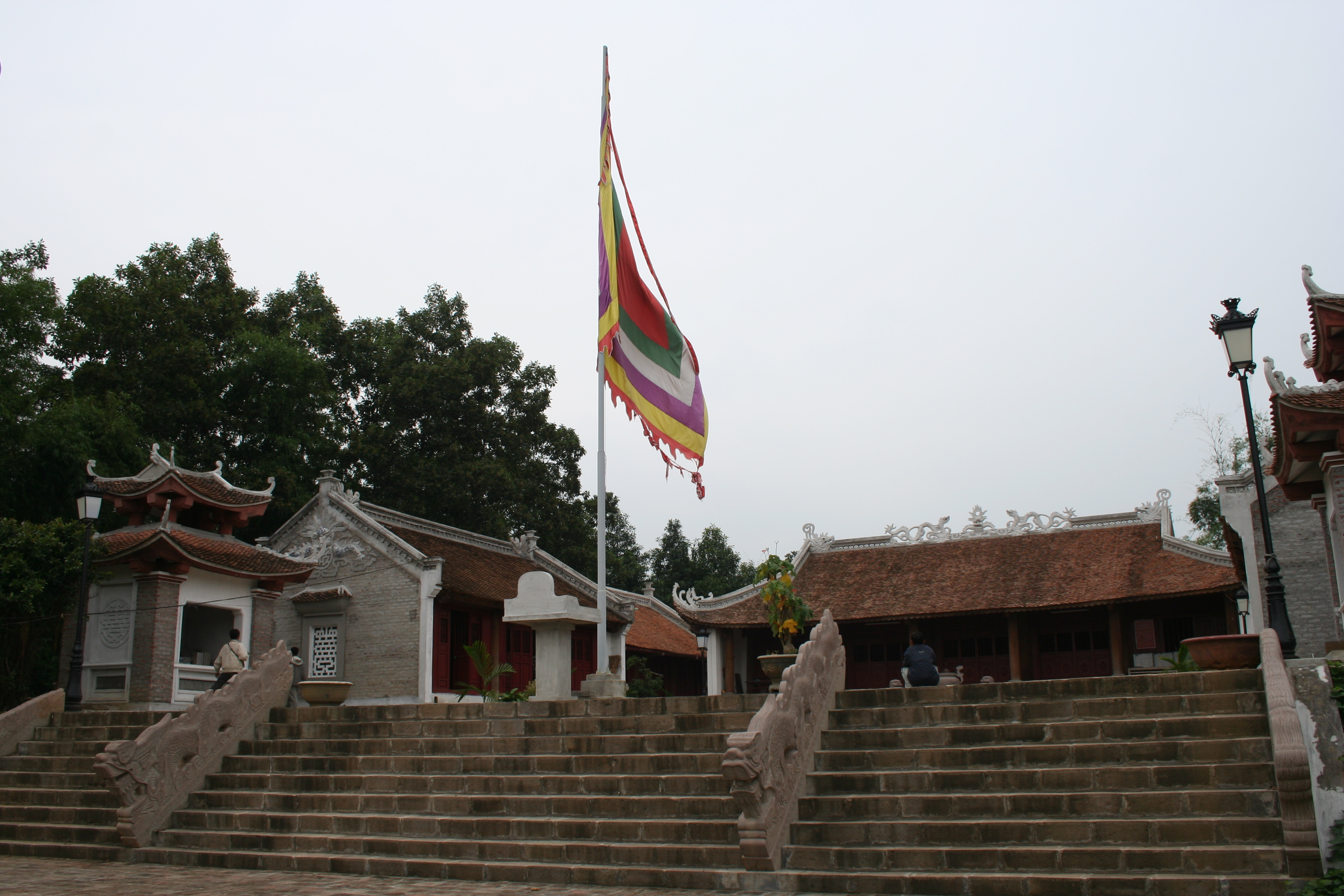
Temple dedicated to the Vũ Lords.

The Vũ Lords, also called the Bầu Lords (Nôm script: 主裒), is a general term referring to the generations of the Vũ family who ruled Tuyên Quang during the period of division between the North and South dynasties and the Trịnh-Nguyễn conflict in Vietnamese history. The Vũ family took advantage of the chaos to establish themselves in Tuyên Quang, opposing the ruling government in Thăng Long. During the North and South division period, the Vũ family did not follow the Mạc dynasty but followed the restored Lê dynasty in Thanh Hoá, but when the restored Lê dynasty returned to Thăng Long, the Vũ family did not submit completely and remained neutral. The generations of the Vũ family guarded the citadel on Bầu mountain, so they were collectively called the Bầu Lords.

The Vũ family ruled Tuyên Quang for 162 years, from 1527 to 1689.

== Notable people with the surname Vũ or Võ ==
=== Academia ===
- Võ Đình Tuấn, Vietnamese biochemist at Duke University
- Vũ Hà Văn, Vietnamese mathematician at Yale University
- Võ Tòng Xuân, Vietnamese agricultural expert and former university administrator, also known as Dr. Rice

=== Arts and entertainment ===
- Bao Vo, Vietnamese American musician
- Tracy Vo, Vietnamese Australian journalist and news presenter
- Võ Hoàng Yến, Vietnamese supermodel
- Anh Vu, Vietnamese Norwegian singer and actress
- Cuong Vu, Vietnamese American jazz trumpeter
- Thuy Vu, Vietnamese American journalist and news presenter
- Tom Vu, Vietnamese American poker player and former infomercial star
- Victor Vu, Vietnamese-American film director

=== Military ===
- Võ Tánh, Vietnamese 18th century military commander; general for the Nguyễn Dynasty
- Võ Nguyên Giáp, Vietnamese 20th century military commander who led forces to victory in the Indochina wars
- Vũ Ngọc Đỉnh, North Vietnamese flying ace during the Vietnam War

=== Politics ===
- Anny Vu, American diplomat
- Võ Chí Công, Communist party member and late 20th century President of Vietnam
- Hubert Vo, Vietnamese American Democratic politician
- Võ Văn Kiệt, late 20th century Prime Minister of Vietnam
- Võ Hồng Phúc, retired Vietnamese communist politician
- Võ Văn Thưởng, 11th President of Vietnam
- Tri Vo, Vietnamese Australian Labor politician
- Vũ Hồng Khanh, 20th century Vietnamese revolutionary opposing both French and Communist rule
- Vũ Văn Mẫu, last Prime Minister of South Vietnam

=== Sports ===
- Lilia Vu, Vietnamese American professional golfer
- Vũ Văn Thanh, Vietnamese professional footballer
- Vũ Ngọc Thịnh, Vietnamese professional footballer
- Vũ Thị Trang, Vietnamese professional badminton player
- Vũ Minh Tuấn, Vietnamese professional footballer

== See also ==
- List of common Vietnamese surnames
