= Trang Trịnh =

- Born: Trịnh Mai Trang; 1986 (age 39–40); Hanoi, Vietnam
- Genres: Classical
- Instrument: Piano

Trịnh Mai Trang (born 1986 in Hanoi) known as Trang Trịnh, is a Vietnamese pianist.

Trang Trinh started musical training aged 4 in Hanoi. She moved to England to study and later graduated from the Royal Academy of Music, London with distinction in 2010 and made her debut in Hanoi Opera House - a concert titled "Piano's Journal" or "Piano's Diary". This concert was particularly noted because of her using other media form (video, voice-over, photography) in her piano creative piano recital.

Trang Trinh is also known for helping underprivileged children to access music education

In November 2011, she returned to the stage of L'espace for another sold-out concert. She has appeared together with Edward Gardner in a concerto performance in London, played for Jean Bernard-Pommier in his Beethoven Unwrapped Masterclass in King's Place, London and performed in Europe.

She was awarded the Sterndale Bennett Scholarship, and the Gretta Parkinson Prize in 2007 for her musical achievement in the Royal Academy of Music.

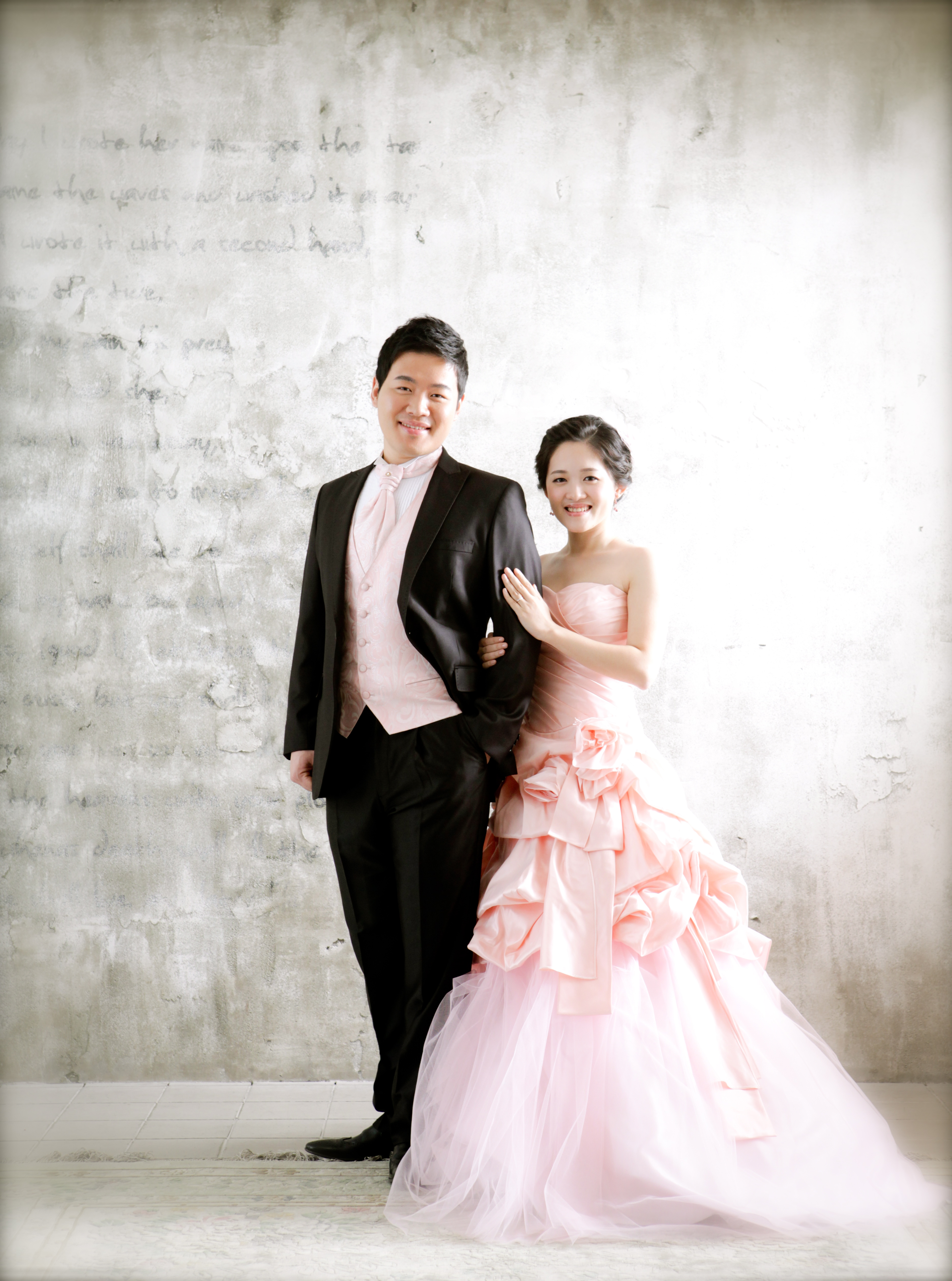
Trang Trinh and Park Sung Min

Trang Trinh is married to South Korean Tenor Park Sung Min in May, 2012.
