= Hoàng Tích Chu =

Vietnamese journalist

- Born: Hoàng Tích Chu (黄錫周); 1 January 1897; Phù Lưu village, Từ Sơn district, Bắc Ninh province, Tonkin, Indochina
- Died: 25 January 1933 (aged 36); Khâm Thiên street, Hanoi, Tonkin, Indochina
- Citizenship: Tonkin
- Occupation: Journalist
- Partner(s): Vương Thị Phượng; Madame Đốc Sao
- Writing career
- Genres: Reporting; Editorial

Hoàng Tích Chu (Chinese: 黄錫周, 1897 - 1933) was a Vietnamese journalist.

== Biography ==
Hoàng Tích Chu was born on 1 January 1897 at Phù Lưu village, Từ Sơn district, Bắc Ninh province. His pennames were Kế Thương, Hoàng Hồ, Văn Tôi.

Hoàng Tích Chu had various hairstyles during his lifetime. He was most recognized as an outstanding journalist. Nevertheless, the Journalist was particularly known for his exceptional looks and his charming character. Before his death at the age of 36 he was often in the spotlight of the press due to his fine haircuts.

== See also ==
- Hoàng Tích Phụng
- Hoàng Tích Chù
- Hoàng Tích Linh
- Hoàng Tích Tộ
- Hoàng Tích Chỉ
