= Sun Jiagu =

Chinese government official

Sun Jiagu (孫家穀; Sun Chia-ku in Wade-Giles) was a native of Anhui who graduated as jinshi in the 1856 and was a senior clerk in the Zongli Yamen when appointed in 1869 to be Co-Envoy with Anson Burlingame, then United States Minister at Beijing, on a friendly mission to foreign countries. It was as a forecast of the results of this mission that Burlingame announced the speedy appearance of "a shining cross on every hill" in the Middle Kingdom. In 1871 he was made Taot'ai at Yichang, and in 1878 Judge in Zhejiang. In 1882 he was recalled to Beijing to await employment.
