= Trần =

- Chữ Hán for Trần
- Pronunciation: IPA: [t͡ʂʌn˨˩]
- Language: Vietnamese

Origin
- Meaning: ancient
- Region of origin: Southeast Asia
- from the Trần dynasty

Trần (陳) or Tran is the second most common Vietnamese surname after Nguyen.

== History ==
Spelling and Pronunciation of Trần
Spelling and Pronunciation of Trần

The Tran ruled the Trần dynasty, a golden era in Vietnam, and successfully repelled the Mongol invasions of Vietnam, introducing improvements to Chinese gunpowder. During the Tran dynasty, arts and sciences flourished, and Chữ Nôm was used for the first time in mainstream poetry. Emperor Trần Nhân Tông was a great reformer of Chu Nom and the first emperor to use Chu Nom in Vietnamese poetry.

== List of people surnamed Tran ==
- Derek Tran (born 1980), American politician and U.S. representative from California's 45th congressional district
- Trần Anh Khoa (1991–2024), Vietnamese footballer
- Trần Bình Trọng (1259–1285), Vietnamese general
- Trần Đại Quang (1956–2018), President of Vietnam
- Trần Độ (1923–2002), lieutenant general of the People's Army of Vietnam and political reformer
- Trần Đức Lương (1937–2025), Vietnamese politician, President of Vietnam (1997–2006)
- Trần dynasty (1225–1400), rulers of Đại Việt/Vietnam
- Later Trần dynasty (1407–1413), period of unrest in Đại Việt/Vietnam
- Trần Hanh (1932–2024), Vietnamese pilot, Lieutenant General, and politician
- Trần Hưng Đạo (1228–1300), prince, statesman, military commander of Đại Việt/Vietnam, whom repelled two out of three major Mongol invasions in late 13th century
- Trần Kim Tuyến (1925–1995), chief of intelligence of South Vietnam
- Trần Lệ Xuân (1924–2011), also known as Madame Nhu, politician of South Vietnam
- Tran My Van (active 1986–2006), Vietnamese Australian academic in history and Asian studies
- Trần Ngọc Tâm (fl 1957–64), member of the Army of the Republic of Vietnam
- Trần Nhân Tông (1258–1308), given name Trần Khâm, emperor of Trần dynasty,
- Trần Phú (1804–1931), Vietnamese General Secretary of Indochinese Communist Party
- Trần Quang Khôi (1930–2023), general of Army of the Republic of Vietnam
- Trần Hưng Đạo, an imperial prince, statesman and military commander of Đại Việt military forces during the Trần dynasty.
- Trần Thái Tông (1218–1277), emperor of Trần dynasty,
- Trần Thánh Tông (1240–1290), given name Trần Hoảng (陳晃), emperor of Trần dynasty
- Trần Thiện Khiêm (1925–2021), officer in Army of the Republic of Vietnam
- Trần Thủ Độ (1194–1264), general, leader of Trần clan
- Trần Trọng Kim (1883–1953), courtesy name Lệ Thần, Vietnamese scholar, Prime Minister of Empire of Vietnam
- Trần Trọng Vũ (born 1964), Vietnamese painter
- Trần Tử Bình (1907–1967), Vietnamese revolutionary, general of Democratic Republic of Vietnam, ambassador
- Trần Văn Đôn (1917–1998), general in Army of the Republic of Vietnam
- Trần Văn Hai (died 1976), brigadier general in Army of the Republic of Vietnam
- Trần Văn Hữu (1896–1984), president of government of Cochinchina, Prime Minister of State of Vietnam
- Trần Văn Hương (1903–1982), president of South Vietnam
- Trần Văn Khắc (1902–1990), founder of Vietnamese Scouting movement
- Charles Trần Văn Lắm (1913–2001), Minister for Foreign Affairs for Republic of Vietnam
- Trần Văn Minh, also known as Sylvain Trần Văn Minh (1923–2009), diplomat, general of Army of the Republic of Vietnam
- Trần Văn Nhung (1933–2020), Vietnamese footballer who played for the South Vietnam national team
- Trần Văn Trà, Nguyễn Chấn, known as Trần Văn Trà (1918–1996), Vietnamese general
- Trần Văn Thủy (born 1940), Vietnamese documentary film director
- Huu Can Tran (1950–2023), perpetrator of the 2023 Monterey Park shooting
- Trần Huỳnh Duy Thức (born 1966) Vietnamese engineer, entrepreneur, human rights activist, prisoner of conscience
- Trần Hiếu Ngân (born 1972), Vietnamese Taekwando athlete
- Trần Thu Hà, also known as Hà Trần (born 1977), Vietnamese singer, producer
- Levy Tran (born 1983), American actress, model
- Natalie Tran (born 1986), Australian video blogger
- Roni Tran Binh Trong (born 1987), Finnish singer
- Karrueche Tran (born 1988), American actress
- Trần Lê Quốc Toàn (born 1989), Vietnamese Olympic weightlifter
- Kelly Marie Tran (born 1989), American actress
- Trần Thị Thùy Dung (born 1990), Miss Vietnam winner
- Trần Tế Hanh (1921–2009), Vietnamese poet
- Lana Condor (born 1997), birth name Tran Dong Lan, American actress
- Thalia Tran (born 2006), American actress
- Trang Thanh Tran, Vietnamese American queer horror author
- Jenn Tran (born 1997), American television personality

== See also ==
- Chen (surname)
