= Nhi Le =

German journalist (born 1995)

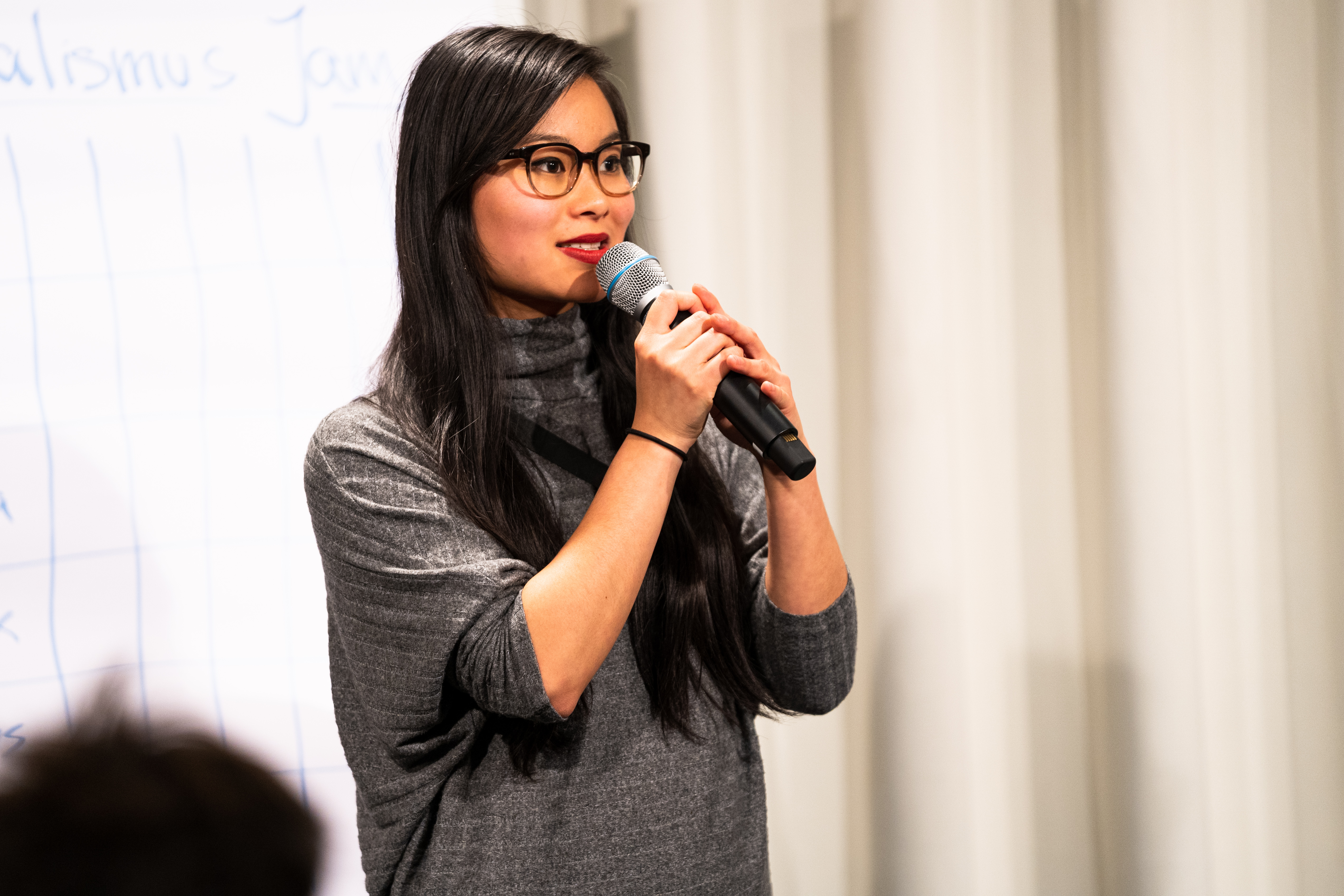
Nhi Le (2019)

Nhi Le (born 1995 in Thuringia) is a German journalist, speaker, moderator, and author.

== Life ==
After graduating from high school, Le studied Bachelor of Communication and Media Studies at University of Leipzig and a double master's degree in Global Mass Communication and Journalism at University of Leipzig and Ohio University. She was a scholarship holder of the DAAD for her master's degree. Her parents come from Vietnam and emigrated to the former GDR. Le lives and works in Leipzig.

== Poetry slam ==
Le regularly participated in poetry slams from 2013 to 2017, mostly with prose texts. She won the Thuringian U20 state championship in 2013 and was the junior winner of the Karl Marx Poetry Prize in 2013 and 2014. In 2014, together with Leonie Warnke, she founded the Sprachaktiv U20 Poetry Slam in Leipzig and thus the first U20 poetry slam in eastern Germany. In 2016, an offshoot of the event series followed in Dresden. There she also appeared regularly as a presenter.

== Journalist ==
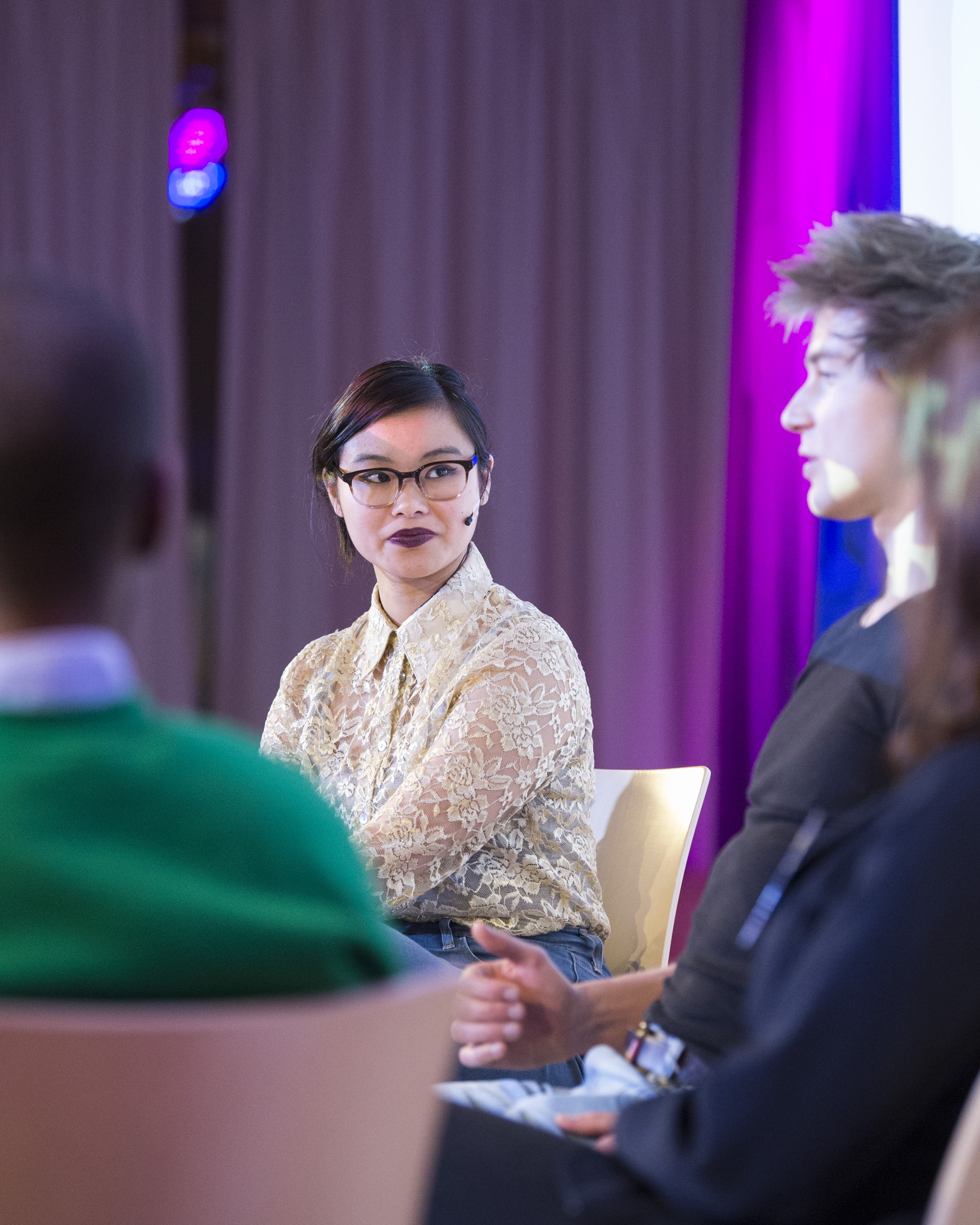
Nhi Le (2017)

Le worked from 2017 to 2018 as a presenter for the funk format Jäger & Sammler. The video "Hauptsache Sexy" based on her bachelor thesis was awarded the Juliane Bartel Prize. Le subsequently spoke in various youth media as well as in the NDR program Panorama – Die Show on the subject of sexism and also appeared there as a sidekick in a clip with Michel Abdollahi. Together with Johannes Filous, she wrote and hosted "verrückt – den Videopodcast über Gesellschaft und Politik in Sachsen" of the Grimme Online Award winning project Straßengezwitscher. She has also written columns and articles for Couragiert-Magazin, Blonde Magazine, taz, übermedien, Zeit Campus, the Heinrich-Böll-Stiftung and has contributed to Deutschlandfunk, Deutschlandfunk Kultur and Deutschlandfunk Nova.

In the course of the Corona pandemic, Le pointed out the increasing racism against Asians. A tweet on the subject led to her being blocked on Twitter and triggered a discussion about the misuse of the NetzDG. In 2020/2021, Le published on jetzt. de, an online magazine of the Süddeutsche Zeitung, for a year with a bi-weekly column entitled "The Female Gaze." In it, she dealt "from a media-cultural and personal perspective with how series and films influence our perception of womanhood," according to Deutschlandfunk Nova.

According to her own statements, she has been moderating the Instagram account of MDR Investigativ since October 2020.

In summer 2021, she was voted one of the top 30 young talents in journalism by Medium Magazin and was on the cover of the magazine.

She has volunteered at Norddeutscher Rundfunk.

== Speaker ==
As a speaker, Le gives talks and discusses on Panels, mostly on the topics of feminism, racism and media culture. She gave speeches and lectures for, among others, the University of Leipzig, Re:publica, TINCON, Disney, Filmkunstmesse Leipzig, Universität Rostock, Verband Deutscher Zeitschriftenverleger, Deutscher Gewerkschaftsbund, TEDx, Institut für Protest- und Bewegungsforschung, Deutscher Journalistenverband and at Stanford University.

== Moderator ==
Le is active as a presenter for various journalistic formats or cultural events. She has already moderated at the Sarajevo Film Festival, for the Jugendpresse Deutschland, Amnesty International, at the Goldener Spatz children's media festival, Plan International and for the Bundeszentrale für politische Bildung.

== Awards ==
- 2013: Thuringian U20 state champion in poetry slam
- 2013: Junior prizewinner of the Karl Marx Poetry Prize
- 2014: Junior winner of the Karl Marx Poetry Prize
- 2017: Juliane Bartel Prize
- 2021: Medium Magazine: Top 30 to 30]
- 2023: Alternative Media Prize: Life category

In 2019, Zeit ranked her among the 100 most important young East Germans. In 2020, the media service turi2 ranked her among the 20 young journalists who stood out in 2020.
