= Nguyễn Văn Hưng =

Vietnamese politician

Nguyễn Văn Hưng (born August 19, 1958) is a politician and a general of People's Army of Vietnam.

He was born in the Phước Vĩnh An commune in the Củ Chi District of Saigon. He joined the Communist Party of Vietnam on December 12, 1978.

He served on the Commanding Committee of Ho Chi Minh City in the rank of colonel. He is a member of the 13th National Assembly of Vietnam as a delegate of Ho Chi Minh City.
