= Phùng =

Phùng (馮) family Vietnamese Five Colours Flag

Phung is a Vietnamese surname. The name is transliterated as Feng in Chinese and Pung in Korean. The word Phung without the accent is also a Chinese surname Péng (彭), usually found in Southeast Asia.

Phung is the anglicized variation of the surname Phùng.

== Notable people with the surname Phùng ==
- Phùng Hưng (?–789/91), Vietnamese chief and military leader
- Phùng Khắc Khoan (1528–1613), Vietnamese military strategist, politician and diplomat
- Phùng Quang Thanh (1949–2021), officer of the Vietnam People's Army
- Phùng Thị Chính, Vietnamese noblewoman
- Phùng Khánh Linh (born May 7, 1994), Vietnamese singer and songwriter
- Phùng Thị Lệ Lý (born December 19, 1949), Vietnamese-American writer
- Phùng Trương Trân Đài, Vietnamese beauty pageant
- Điềm Phùng Thị (August 18, 1920 – January 28, 2002), Vietnamese modernist sculptor
- Phùng Quán (January 1932 – January 22, 1995), Vietnamese novelist and poet
