= Bùi =

Bùi (裴) family Vietnamese Five Colours Flag

Bùi (Chữ Hán: 裴) is a common Vietnamese surname, ranked 9th among the most common surnames in Vietnam. The surname Pei (裴) in Chinese and Bae (배) in Korean share the same origin with it.

Notable people with the name include:

- Bùi Bích Phương, Miss Vietnam in 1988
- Bùi Diễm (1923–2021), Vietnamese diplomat
- Bùi Đình Đạm, general of the Army of the Republic of Vietnam
- Bùi Thanh Liêm (1949–1981), Vietnamese aviator and cosmonaut
- Bùi Thế Sơn, Vietnamese-American singer
- Bùi Thị Xuân, Vietnamese general
- Bui Tuong Phong (1942–1975), Vietnamese computer scientist
- Bùi Thị Nhung, Vietnamese high jumper
- Bùi Tín (1927–2018), Vietnamese army officer and dissident
- Bùi Thị Xuân (died 1802), Vietnamese general
- Bùi Tấn Trường, Vietnamese goalkeeper
- Bùi Văn Bình, Vietnamese footballer
- Bùi Xuân Phái (1920–1988), Vietnamese painter
