= Ton-That =

Ton-That (Note: often simplified as Ton That, Ton-That, or Tonthat in English-language text) (Vietnamese: Tôn Thất (Note: pronounced [ton˧˧ tʰət̚˧˦] in Hanoi, [toŋ˧˧ tʰək̚˦˧˥] in Hue and [toŋ˧˧ tʰək̚˦˥] in Saigon; the closest English approximation is "tong-tuk" or "tong-tut".)) and Tôn Nữ (for female) is a two-character Vietnamese compound surname, originating from the Nguyễn dynasty. It is the surname for members of the imperial family that were not direct first-born descendants of the Emperor, and therefore considered collateral relatives of the Nguyễn dynasty.

This surname was originally Tông Thất (宗室), which is derived from a Sino-Vietnamese word, meaning "clan members" or "royal family members". The surname was changed to Tôn Thất (尊室) after Thiệu Trị (né: Nguyễn Phúc Miên Tông) became the emperor due to naming taboo.

== Notable people ==
- Tôn Thất Đính (1812–1893), Nguyễn Dynasty mandarin
- Tôn Thất Thuyết (1839–1913), Nguyễn Dynasty regent
- Tôn Thất Xứng (1923–2018), South Vietnamese general
- Tôn Thất Thiện (1924–2014), South Vietnamese nationalist
- Tôn Thất Đính (1926–2013), South Vietnamese general
- Tôn-Thất Tiết (born 1933), music composer
- Tôn Nữ Thị Ninh (born 1947), Vietnamese diplomat and educator
- Tôn-Thất An (born 1970), music composer
- Hoan Ton-That (born 1988), Vietnamese-Australian programmer/entrepreneur

== See also ==
- Nguyễn
- Nguyễn dynasty
