= Hoàng Tích Chù =

Vietnamese painter

Hoàng Tích Chù (Từ Sơn; 1912 in Bắc Ninh – 20 October 2003) was a Vietnamese painter.

Pilonnage Du Riz, 1968
