= Old Chosŏn =

? – 108 BC state in East Asia

Joseon 朝鮮
- 2333 (Mythological founding)–108 BCE
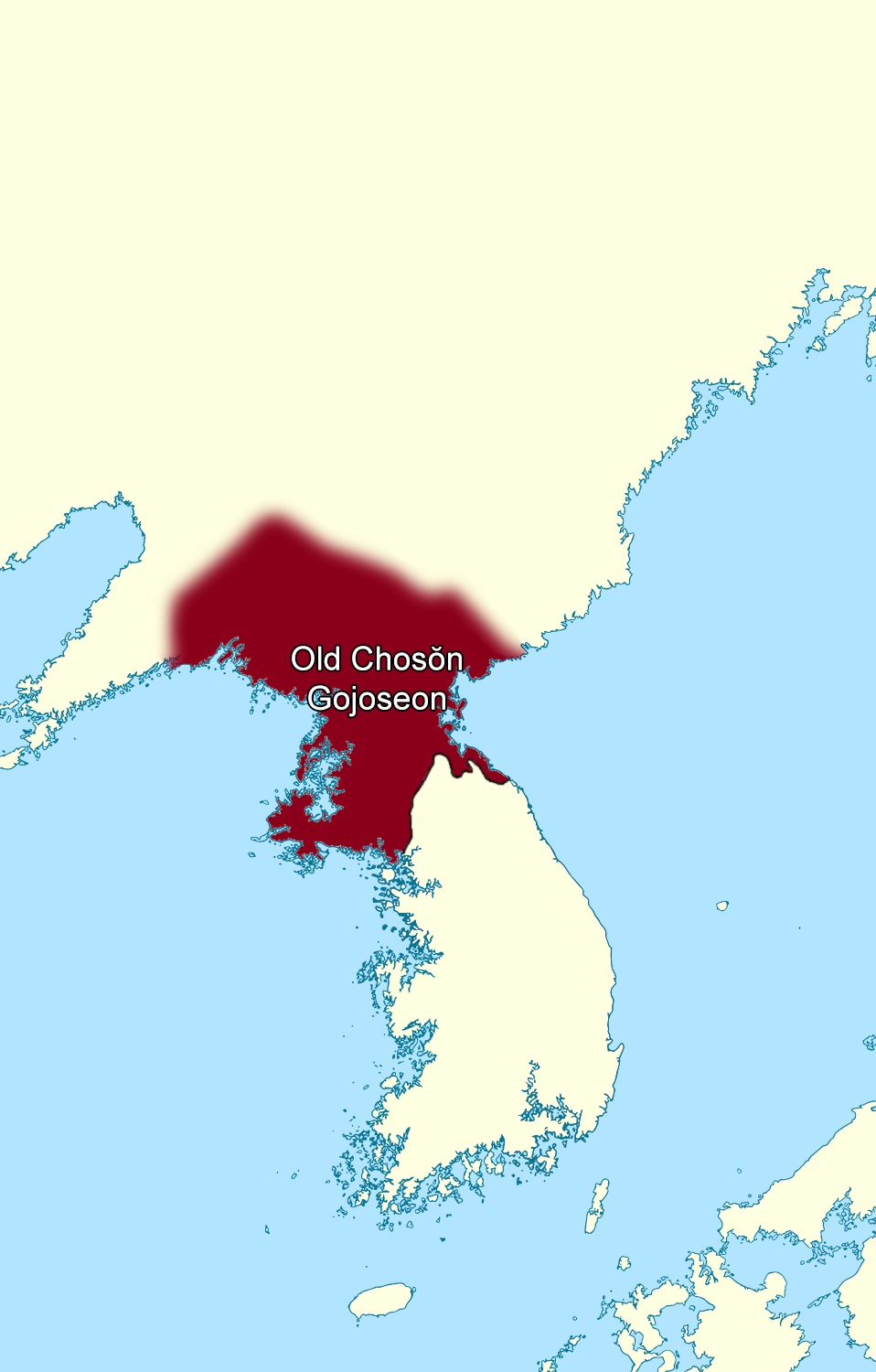
- Old Chosŏn in 108 BCE
- Capital: Wanggeom City
- Common languages: Ye-Maek (Koreanic), Classical Chinese (literary)
- Ethnic groups: Yemaek
- Religion: Shamanism
- Government: Monarchy
- King
  - 2333? BCE–?: Tan'gun (first)
  - 232?–220? BCE: Bu
  - 220–194 BCE: Jun
  - 194 BCE–?: Wi Man
  - ?–108 BCE: Wi Ugeo (last)
- Historical era: Ancient
  - Established: 2333 (Mythological founding)
  - Coup by Wi Man: 194 BCE
  - Gojoseon–Han War: 109–108 BCE
  - Fall of Wanggeom City: 108 BCE
Succeeded by
Yemaek
Samhan
Four Commanderies of Han
- Today part of: North Korea; South Korea; China

Korean name
- Hangul: 고조선
- Hanja: 古朝鮮
- RR: Gojoseon
- MR: Kojosŏn
- IPA: [ko.dʑo.sʌn]

Alternate name
- Hangul: 조선
- Hanja: 朝鮮
- RR: Joseon
- MR: Chosŏn
- IPA: [tɕo.sʌn]

Old Chosŏn, also known as Gojoseon (Korean: 고조선; Hanja: 古朝鮮) and its contemporary name Joseon (Korean: 조선; Hanja: 朝鮮), was the first kingdom on the Korean Peninsula. According to Korean mythology, the kingdom was established by the legendary king Tan'gun. Old Chosŏn possessed the most advanced culture in the Korean Peninsula at the time and was an important marker in the progression towards the more centralized states of later periods. The addition of Go (고; 古), meaning "old" or "ancient", is used in historiography to distinguish the kingdom from the Joseon, which was founded in 1392.

According to the Samguk yusa, Old Chosŏn was established in 2333 BCE by Tan'gun, who was said to be born from the heavenly prince Hwanung and a bear-woman, Ungnyeo. While Tan'gun is a mythological figure, some interpret his legend as a reflection of the sociocultural conditions of the kingdom's early development. The account of Tan'gun has played an important role in the development of Korean identity. Today, the founding date of Old Chosŏn is officially celebrated as Gaecheonjeol ('National Foundation Day') in North and South Korea.

Chinese sources such as the Shangshu dazhuan and the Book of Documents claim that in the 12th century BCE, following the establishment of Old Chosŏn, Jizi (also known as Kija), a sage who belonged to the royal family from the Shang dynasty, immigrated to the northern part of the Korean Peninsula and became the founder of Kija Chosŏn. There are many interpretations of Old Chosŏn and Kija Chosŏn as well as debates regarding Kija Chosŏn's existence.

In 194 BCE, the ruling dynasty of Old Chosŏn was overthrown by Wiman, a refugee from the Han vassal state of Yan, who then established Wiman Joseon.

In 108 BCE, the Han dynasty, under Emperor Wu, invaded and conquered Wiman Joseon. The Han established four commanderies to administer the former Old Chosŏn territory. After the fragmentation of the Han Empire during the 3rd century and the subsequent chaotic 4th century, the area escaped Chinese control and was conquered by Goguryeo in 313 CE.

The capital of Old Chosŏn was Wanggeom-seong (now Pyongyang) from at least the 2nd century BCE. In the southern region of the Korean Peninsula, the Jin state arose by the 3rd century BCE.

== Founding myths ==
There are three different main founding myths concerning Old Chosŏn, which revolve around Tan'gun, Kija, or Wiman.

=== Tan'gun myth ===
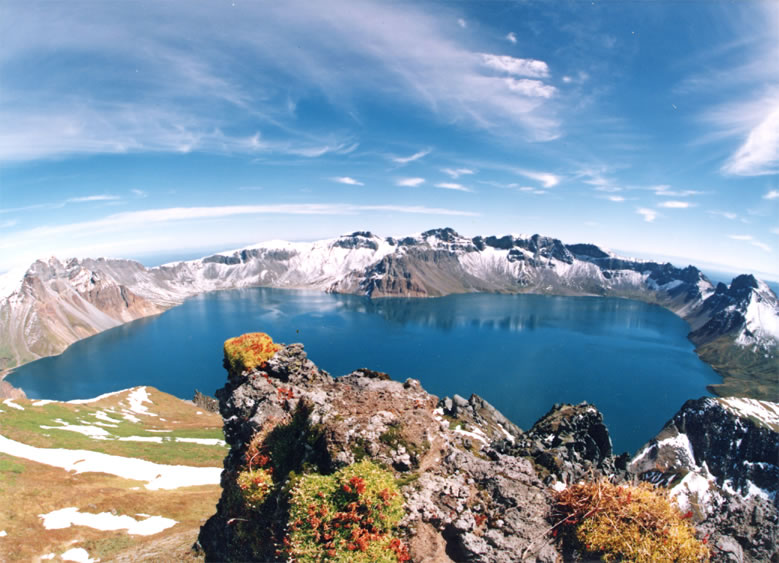
Heaven Lake of Baekdu Mountain, where Dangun's father is said to have descended from heaven

The myths revolving around Tan'gun were recorded in the later Korean work Samguk yusa of the 13th century. This work states that Tan'gun, the offspring of a heavenly prince and a bear-woman, founded Old Chosŏn in 2333 BCE, and was succeeded by Kija (Jizi) after King Wu of Zhou had placed him onto the throne in 1122 BCE. A similar account is found in Jewang Ungi. According to the legend, the Lord of Heaven, Hwanin had a son, Hwanung, who descended to Baekdu Mountain and founded the city of Shinsi. Then a bear and a tiger came to Hwanung and said that they wanted to become people. Hwanung said to them that if they went in a cave and lived there for 100 days while only eating mugwort and garlic he would change them into human beings. However, about halfway through the 100 days the tiger gave up and ran out of the cave. The bear, in contrast, successfully restrained herself and became a beautiful woman named Ungnyeo. Hwanung later married Ungnyeo, and she gave birth to Tan'gun.

While the Tan'gun story is considered to be a myth, it is believed it is a mythical synthesis of a series of historical events relating to the founding of Old Chosŏn. There are various theories on the origin of this myth. Seo and Kang (2002) believe the Tan'gun myth is based on integration of two different tribes, an invasive sky-worshipping Bronze Age tribe and a native bear-worshipping neolithic tribe, that led to the foundation of Old Chosŏn. Lee K. B. (1984) believes 'Tan'gun-wanggeom' was a title borne by successive leaders of Old Chosŏn.

Tan'gun is said to have founded Old Chosŏn around 2333 BCE, based on the descriptions of the Samguk yusa, Jewang Ungi, Tongguk t'onggam and the Annals of the Joseon Dynasty. The date differs among historical sources, although all of them put it during the mythical Emperor Yao's reign (traditional dates: 2357 BCE? – 2256 BCE?). Samguk yusa says Tan'gun ascended to the throne in the 50th year of the legendary Yao's reign, Annals of the King Sejong says the first year, and Tongguk t'onggam says the 25th year.

In the 7th century BCE, the Yan pioneered the Northeast regions. According to The Growth of Yan and The Context of Guanzi, it can be presumed that Old Chosŏn grew through trade in this era. It is estimated that Old Chosŏn developed so far as to be able to wage war against the Yan in the 4th century BCE.

=== Kija myth ===
Kija (known as "Jizi" in Chinese), a man from the period of the Shang dynasty, allegedly fled to the Korean peninsula in 1122 BCE during the fall of the Shang to the Zhou dynasty and founded Kija Chosŏn. Kija Chosŏn is recognized and mentioned in the earliest surviving Chinese record, Records of the Three Kingdoms. No contemporary Korean sources existed for Kija Chosŏn, and the oldest sources produced in Korea were from the Goryeo dynasty. The earliest Korean record about Kija Chosŏn can be seen from Samguk Yusa. (Note: No contemporary Korean sources exist for Kija Chosŏn, and the oldest sources produced in Korea about Korean history were from the Goryeo dynasty, as history books made before their times were usually lost, either through war or book burnings. However, Samguk Sagi and Samguk Yusa have some authority as they are said to be compilations of records that were much older than the date those books were published, which were accessible at the time of the project.)

By the middle of Goryeo dynasty, a state cult had developed around Kija. The Dongsa Gangmok of 1778 described Kija's activities and contributions in Old Chosŏn. The records of Kija refer to Eight Prohibitions (범금팔조; 犯禁八條), that are recorded by the Book of Han and evidence a hierarchical society with legal protections of private property.

In pre-modern Korea, Kija represented the authenticating presence of Chinese civilization. Until the 12th century CE, Koreans commonly believed that Tan'gun bestowed upon Korea its people and basic culture, while Kija gave Korea its high culture, and presumably, standing as a legitimate civilisation.

Many modern experts have denied Kija Chosŏn's existence for various reasons, mainly due to contradicting archaeological evidence and anachronistic historical evidence. They point to the Bamboo Annals and the Analects of Confucius, which were among the first works to mention Kija, but do not mention his migration to Old Chosŏn. Kija Chosŏn might have just existed as a symbol of the pre-Qin dynasty migrants who escaped the chaos of the Warring States period.

=== Wiman ===
Wiman (known as "Wei Man" in Chinese) was a military officer of the Yan of northeastern China who fled to the northern Korean peninsula in 195 BCE from the encroaching Han dynasty. He founded a principality with Wanggeom-seong as its capital, which is thought to be in the region of present-day Pyongyang. Chinese books such as the 3rd-century Chinese text Weilüe of the Records of the Three Kingdoms, and the Book of the Later Han, recorded that Wiman usurped King Chun and thus took over the kingship of Old Chosŏn.

=== Academic perspectives ===
Old Chosŏn mythology and history can be divided into three phases, Tan'gun, Kija Chosŏn, and Wiman Joseon.

1. Kang & Macmillan (1980), Sohn et al. (1970), Kim J.B. (1980), Han W.K. (1970), Yun N. H. (1985), Lee K.B. (1984), Lee J.B. (1987) viewed the Tan'gun myth as a native product of proto-Koreans, although it is not always associated with Old Chosŏn. Kim J.B. (1987) rejected the Tan'gun myth's association with Old Chosŏn and pushes it further back to the Neolithic period. Sohn et al. (1970) suggested that the Tan'gun myth is associated with the Dongyi, whom they viewed as the ancestors of Koreans. Kim C. (1948) suggested the Tan'gun myth had a Chinese origin, tracing it to a Han dynasty tomb in the Shandong peninsula.
2. Gardiner (1969), Henderson (1959), McCune (1962) considered the Kija myth to be a later conflation. Sohn et al. (1970) dismissed the Kija story as a Chinese fabrication. On the other hand, Hatada (1969), gave Old Chosŏn a Chinese identity, exclusively ascribed it to the Kija myth, and moved it to the 3rd century BCE. Shim Jae-Hoon (2002) accepted the eastward migration of Kija, but denied the relationship between Kija and Joseon, suggesting that the existence of Old Chosŏn could not be extended to the second millennium BCE.
3. Kim C.W. (1966), Han W.K. (1970), Choi M.L. (1983, 1984, 1985, 1992), Han W.K. (1984), Kim J.B. (1987), Lee K.B. (1984) accepted Wiman as a historical figure. Gardiner (1969) questioned authenticity of the Wiman myth, although he mentioned there were interactions between Old Chosŏn and the Han dynasty and social unrest in the area during that time period.

==== Controversies ====
The first extant Korean text to mention Kija (the Korean pronunciation of Jizi) was Kim Pusik's Samguk sagi (completed in 1145), which claimed that Kija had been enfeoffed in Haedong (海東: Korea) by the Zhou court, but commented that this account was uncertain because of the brevity of the sources. Only in the thirteenth century did Korean texts start to integrate Kija more fully into Korean history. The Samguk yusa (1281) explained that after being enfeoffed by King Wu of Zhou, Kija replaced Dangun's descendants as the ruler of Old Chosŏn, whereas Jewang Ungi (1287) identified Tan'gun and Kija as the first rulers of former and latter Joseon respectively. Most premodern Korean historians after that accepted that Kija had replaced another indigenous power (represented by Tan'gun) in Old Joseon.

In 1102, during the Goryeo period, King Sukjong built a mausoleum to Kija in a place near Pyongyang that had been identified as Kija's tomb.Sadang for Kija called Kijasa (箕子祠) was also built in Pyongyang. The mausoleum was rebuilt in 1324 and was repaired in 1355, but the cult of Kija spread most widely after the establishment of the Joseon Dynasty in 1392. Because Joseon's state ideology was Neo-Confucianism borrowed from China, Joseon intellectuals promoted Kija as a culture hero who had raised Korean civilization to the same level as China.

By the mid-Joseon dynasty, the established view among historians traced Korean origins to Chinese refugees, considering Korean history that of a long series of kingdoms connected with China. As such, the Kija Chosŏn and Silla states were valorized, while the Old Chosŏn and Goguryeo states were not considered as important. According to this view, the first state in Korea, Kija Chosŏn, was founded by Jizi in 1122 BCE, who was a disgruntled Chinese advisor to the Shang dynasty. The story of how he brought poetry, music, medicine, trade, and a political system to the Korean peninsula was conceived similarly to the proposed Founding of Rome by the Trojan refugee Aeneas. But by the 1930s, under the influence of Shin Chaeho's histories, the Jizi Korean founding story became less popular than that of Tan'gun, the son of a tiger and a bear – the latter being common in Japanese folklore – who brought civilization to the Korean peninsula. Shin and the other historians who promulgated this myth had been influenced by Daejonggyo, a new religious movement which worshipped Tan'gun, but attacked pre-annexation textbook narratives of Tan'gun which portrayed him as the brother of the Japanese god Susanoo. To Shin, Tan'gun was both the founder of the Korean minjok and the first Korean state (kuk), and thus the necessary starting point for Korean history. In response to a challenge by the Japanese scholars Shiratori Kurakichi and Imanishi Ryū of Tan'gun as a fabrication by the author of the Samguk yusa, nationalist historian Choe Nam-seon attacked Japanese mythology as being built upon fabrications.

By focusing on a mythological god which founded a "sacred race" (shinsŏng chongjok), Korean nationalist historiography aims to portray ancient Korea as a golden age of "gods and heroes" where Korea's cultural achievements rivaled those of China and Japan. Accordingly, Shin Chaeho elevated Tan'gun to play a similar role as did the Yellow Emperor in China and which Amaterasu does in Japan. Choe Nam-seon, according to his Purham culture theory, places Tan'gun even above the Chinese and Japanese emperors, because those rulers were supposedly Shamanistic rulers of the ancient Korean "Părk" tradition. The Tan'gun story also lends credence to claims that Korean heritage is over 5000 years old. According to Hyung Il Pai, the popularity of Tan'gun studies can be said to "reflect the progressively ultra-nationalistic trend in Korean historical and archaeological scholarship today". Shin Chaeho named Mount Paektu in the Changbai Mountains on the Sino-Korean border as a part of Korean heritage, by virtue of connection with the mythical Tan'gun. The mountain, however, was also claimed by the Manchus of the Qing dynasty as part of their origin myth at least since the 17th century, and the mountain range is considered sacred in Han Chinese culture as well. This nationalist identification of Baekdu with Koreans was cemented by the operation of Korean independence movement partisans operating from the Chinese border and legitimized with associations to the history of the Old Chosŏn and Balhae states. The Chinese civilizational connection to ancient Korea continues to be attacked by North Korean historians, who allege that the history of Kija Chosŏn was "viciously distorted by the feudal ruling class, the sadaejuui followers, and the big-power chauvinists".

== State formation ==
The first mentions of Old Chosŏn are found in historical records of Guanzi, in which it was mentioned trading with the state of Qi. The Shanhaijing located it to the north of the Bohai Bay. The Zhanguoce, Shanhaijing, and Shiji—containing some of its earliest records—refer to Chosŏn as a region, until the text Shiji began referring it as a country from 195 BCE onwards. According to Mark E. Byington, although Old Chosŏn clearly existed as an entity before the 2nd century BCE, "it is entirely unclear as to whether it was a state-level polity". The location of early Old Chosŏn has been a topic of debate since the Joseon period and was one of the most controversial topics in early Korean history during the 20th century. Traditionally, the mainstream view placed Old Chosŏn in the northern part of the Korean Peninsula. However, since the 1980s and 1990s, South Korean scholarship has shifted the scope of Old Chosŏn to include territories in Manchuria. According to this view, its center only moved to Pyongyang after the Yan conquest of Liaodong in 300 BCE. More recently, many South Korean archaeologists have sought to identify Bronze Age sites in the Liaoxi region in the 9th century BCE as an early center of Old Chosŏn. In contrast, this hypothesis is not widely supported by Chinese and Japanese scholars, although some in the Chinese academia link a migration from Liaoxi to Pyongyang to Kija Chosŏn. Instead, many Japanese and Chinese scholars have recently attempted to push back the date of Yan's eastern expansion even further. Research on the topic has historically been strongly influenced by Japanese colonial legacies and modern Korean nationalism.

By the 4th century BCE, other states with defined political structures developed in the areas of the earlier Bronze Age "walled-town states"; Old Chosŏn was the most advanced of them in the peninsular region. The city-state expanded by incorporating other neighboring city-states by alliance or military conquest. Thus, a vast confederation of political entities between the Taedong and Liao rivers was formed. As Old Chosŏn evolved, so did the title and function of its leader, who came to be designated as "king" (Han), in the tradition of the Zhou dynasty, around the same time as the Yan (燕) leader. Records of that time mention the hostility between the feudal state in Northern China and the "confederated" kingdom of Old Chosŏn. Notably, a plan to attack the Yan beyond the Liao River frontier is recorded. This confrontation led to the decline and eventual downfall of Old Chosŏn, described in Yan records as "arrogant" and "cruel". But the ancient kingdom also appears as a prosperous Bronze Age civilization with a complex social structure, including a class of horse-riding warriors who contributed to the development of Old Chosŏn and its northern expansion into most of the Liaodong basin.

Around 300 BCE, Old Chosŏn lost significant western territory after a war with the Yan state, but this indicates Old Chosŏn was already a large enough state that it could wage war against the Yan and survive the loss of 2000 li (800 kilometers) of territory. Old Chosŏn is thought to have relocated its capital to the Pyongyang region around this time.

=== Wiman Joseon and downfall ===
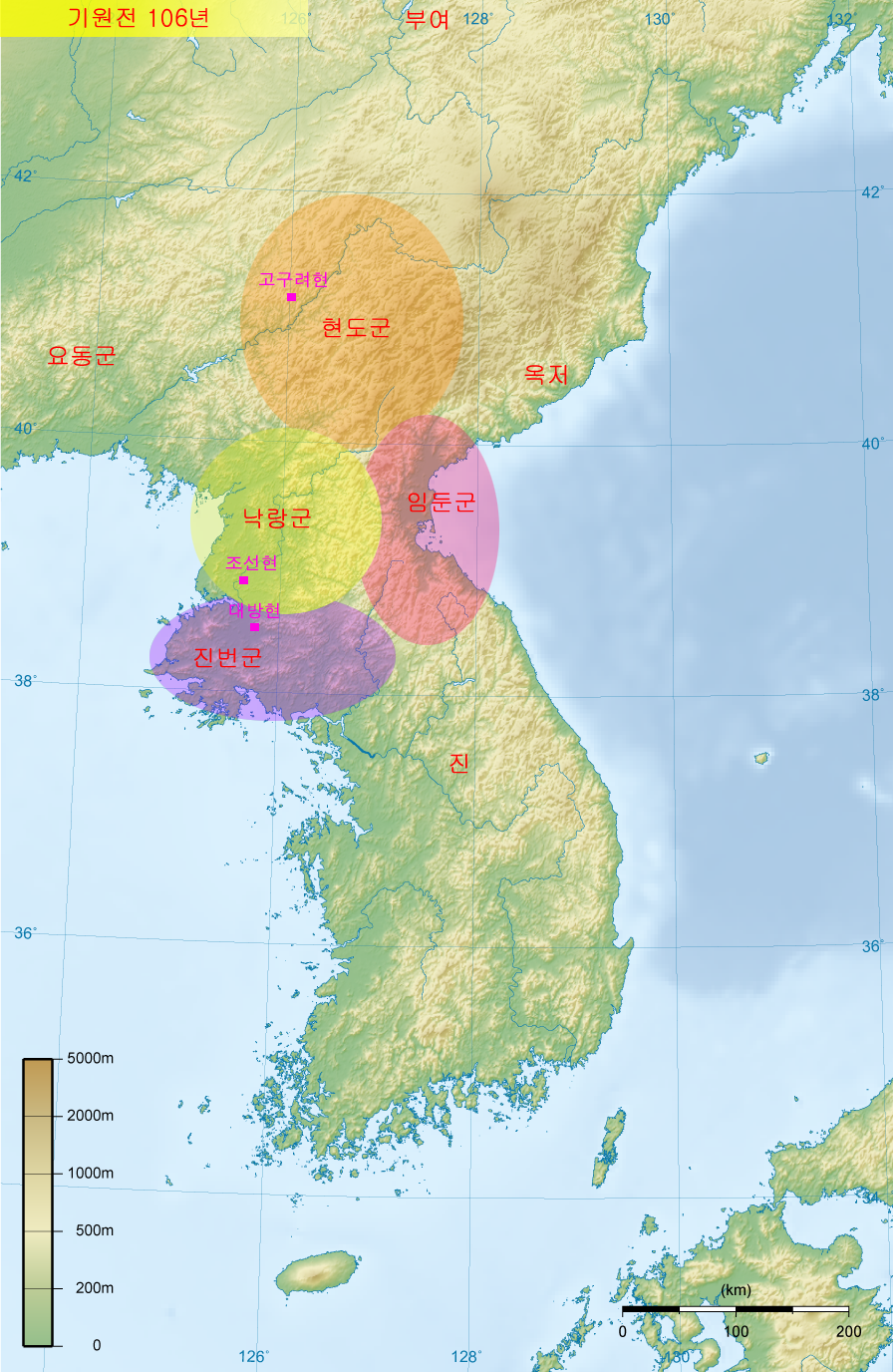
Han dynasty destroys Wiman Joseon, establishing Four Commanderies of Han in the northern Korean peninsula.

In 195 BCE, King Jun appointed a refugee from Yan, Wiman, to guard the frontier. Wiman later rebelled in 194 BCE and usurped the throne of Old Chosŏn. King Jun fled to Jin in the south of the Korean Peninsula.

In 109 BCE, Emperor Wu of Han invaded near the Liao River. A conflict would erupt in 109 BCE, when Wiman's grandson King Ugeo (우거왕; 右渠王) refused to let Jin's ambassadors through his territory in order to reach the Han dynasty. King Ugeo refused and had his son, Prince Wi Jang (長降) escort the ambassador back home. However, when they got close to Han's borders, the ambassador assassinated Wi Jang (長降) and claimed to Emperor Wu that he had defeated Joseon in battle. Emperor Wu, unaware of this deception, made him the military commander of the Commandery of Liaodong. The outraged King Ugeo made a raid on Liaodong and killed She He. Scholars also hypothesize that the initiation of war may also have been because the Han dynasty was concerned that Old Chosŏn would ally with the Xiongnu against the Han.

In response, Emperor Wu commissioned a two-pronged attack, both by land and sea, against Old Chosŏn. The two forces attacking Old Chosŏn were unable to coordinate well with each other and suffered large losses. Eventually, the commands were merged, and Wanggeom fell in 108 BCE. Han took over the Old Chosŏn lands and established Four Commanderies of Han in the western part of former Old Chosŏn.

Old Chosŏn disintegrated by the 1st century BCE as it gradually lost the control of its former fiefs. Many successor states sprang from its former territory, such as Buyeo, Okjeo, Dongye. Goguryeo and Baekje arose out from Buyeo.

== Culture ==
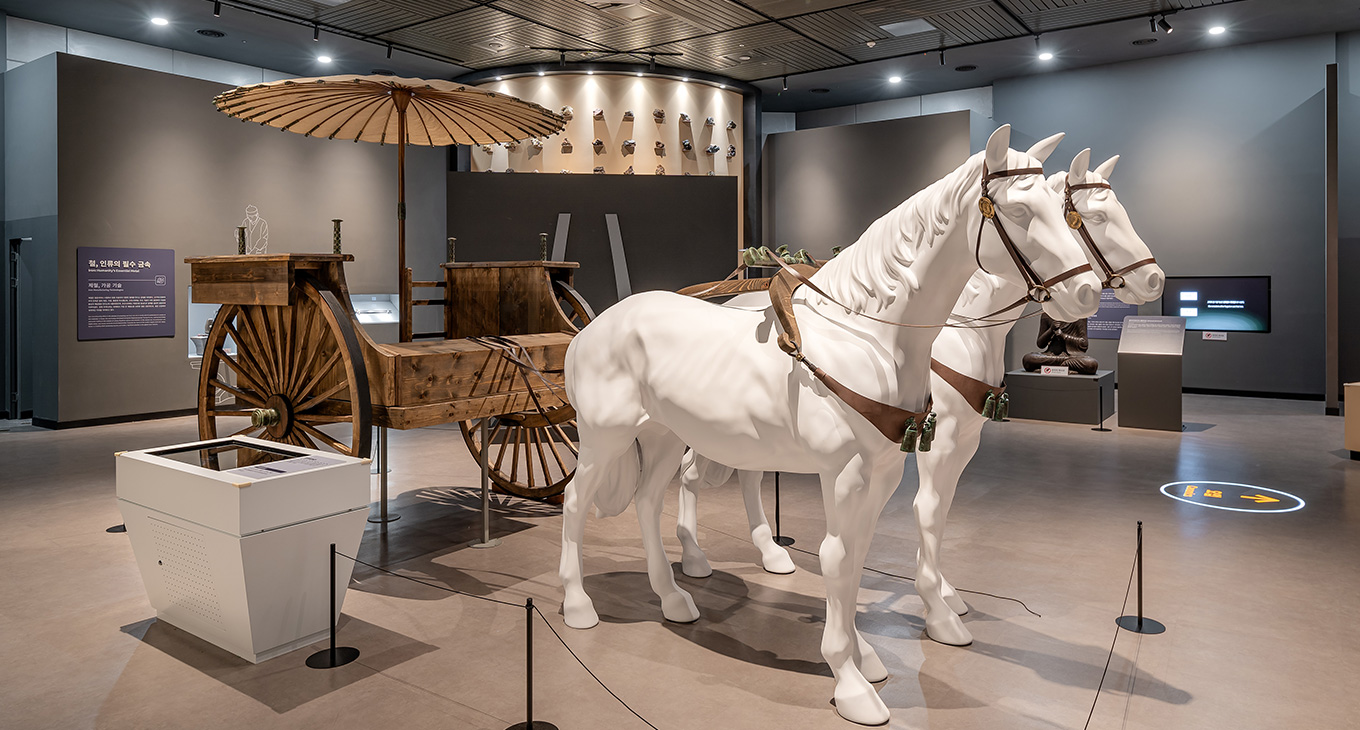
Reconstructed Model of the Gojoseon Two-Horse Chariot in National Science Museum of Korea

Around 2000 BCE, a new pottery culture of painted and chiseled design was developed. These people practiced agriculture in a settled communal life, probably organized into familial clans. Rectangular huts and increasingly larger dolmen burial sites were found throughout the peninsula. Bronze daggers and mirrors have been excavated, and there is archaeological evidence of small walled-town states in this period. Dolmens similar to the northern Korean type can be found in northeastern China and in Shandong, where they are less numerous but larger. A southern type of dolmens was later introduced from the Korean Peninsula to Kyushu, Japan.

=== Mumun pottery ===
In the Mumun pottery period (1500 – 300 BCE), plain coarse pottery replaced earlier comb-pattern wares, possibly as a result of the influence of new populations migrating to Korea from Manchuria and Siberia. This type of pottery typically has thicker walls and displays a wider variety of shapes, indicating improvements in kiln technology. This period is sometimes called the "Korean Bronze Age", but bronze artifacts are relatively rare and regionalized until the 7th century BCE.

Rice cultivation was extensive in the lower parts of South Korea and Manchuria in the periods between 1900 BCE to 200 CE.

=== Bronze tools ===
The beginning of the Bronze Age on the peninsula is usually said to be 1000 BCE, but estimates range from the 13th to 8th centuries BCE. Although the Korean Bronze Age culture derives from the Liaoning and Manchuria, it exhibits unique typology and styles, especially in ritual objects.

By the 7th century BCE, a Bronze Age material culture with influences from Manchuria, eastern Mongolia, as well as Siberia and Scythian bronze styles, flourished on the peninsula. Korean bronzes contain a higher percentage of zinc than those of the neighboring bronze cultures. Bronze artifacts, found most frequently in burial sites, consist mainly of swords, spears, daggers, small bells, and mirrors decorated with geometric patterns.

Gojoseon's development seems linked to the adoption of bronze technology. Its singularity finds its most notable expression in the idiosyncratic type of bronze swords, or "mandolin-shaped daggers" (비파형동검; 琵琶形銅劍). The mandolin-shape dagger is found in the regions of Liaoning, Hebei, and Manchuria down to the Korean Peninsula. It suggests the existence of Old Chosŏn dominions. Remarkably, the shape of the "mandolin" dagger of Old Chosŏn differs significantly from the sword artifacts found in China.

=== Tombs ===
==== Dolmen tombs ====
Megalithic dolmens appear in Korean peninsula and Manchuria around 2000 BCE to 400 BCE. Around 900 BCE, burial practices become more elaborate, a reflection of increasing social stratification. Goindol, the dolmen tombs in Korea and Manchuria, comprising upright stones supporting a horizontal slab, are more numerous in Korea than in other parts of East Asia. Other new forms of burial are stone cists (underground burial chambers lined with stone) and earthenware jar coffins. The bronze objects, pottery, and jade ornaments recovered from dolmens and stone cists indicate that such tombs were reserved for the elite class.

Around the 6th century BCE, burnished red wares, made of a fine iron-rich clay and characterized by a smooth, lustrous surface, appear in dolmen tombs, as well as in domestic bowls and cups.

==== Other types of tombs ====
In 1964, through a joint excavation by China and North Korea, Gangshang and Loushang tombs (岗上楼上墓地) were found in 1964 on the Liaodong peninsula. Loushang was found earlier prior to the excavation in 1958 Gangshang and Loushang tombs are considered to be burial cairn tombs of local nobilities of Old Chosŏn. Some consider the tombs as the evidences of the slavery that could have existed, but others find that the evidences are inadequate and lacking to deduce such conclusion.

=== Iron culture ===
Around this time, the state of Jin occupied the southern part of the Korean peninsula. Very little is known about this state except that it was the apparent predecessor to the Samhan confederacies.

Around 300 BCE, iron technology was introduced into Korea from Yan state. Iron was produced locally in the southern part of the peninsula by the 2nd century BCE. According to Chinese accounts, iron from the lower Nakdong River in the southeast was valued throughout the peninsula and Japan.

=== Poetry ===
In the book of Gu Jin Zhu (古今注) written by Cui Bao (崔豹) of the Western Jin period, poetry called Gonghuyin (箜篌引) or Gongmudohaga (공무도하가; 公無渡河歌) is said to be of Old Chosŏn origin. The poetry is as follows:

公無渡河 "Don't cross the river, my love."

公竟渡河 "My love eventually crossed the river.'

墮河而死 "Now that my love is drowned,"

當奈公何 "There's nothing that I can do."

== Proto–Three Kingdoms of Korea ==
Numerous small states and confederations arose from the remnants of Old Chosŏn, including Goguryeo, the Buyeo kingdom, Okjeo, and Dongye. Three of the Chinese commanderies fell to local resistance within a few decades, but the last, Nakrang, remained an important commercial and cultural outpost until it was destroyed by the expanding Goguryeo in 313 CE.

Jun of Gojoseon is said to have fled to the state of Jin in the southern Korean Peninsula. Jin developed into the Samhan confederacies, the beginnings of Baekje and Silla, continuing to absorb migration from the north. The Samhan confederacies were Mahan, Jinhan, and Byeonhan. King Jun ruled Mahan, which was eventually annexed by Baekje. Goguryeo, Baekje, and Silla gradually grew into the Three Kingdoms of Korea that dominated the entire peninsula by around the 4th century.

== See also ==
- Names of Korea
- History of Korea
- Three Confederate States of Gojoseon

== Bibliography ==
- Barnes, Gina Lee (2001). State Formation in Korea: Historical and Archaeological Perspectives. Psychology Press. ISBN 978-0-7007-1323-3.
- Lee, Ki-Baik (1984). A New History of Korea. Harvard University Press. ISBN 978-0-674-61575-5.
- Peterson, Mark; Margulies, Phillip (2009). A brief history of Korea. New York, NY: Facts On File. ISBN 9781438127385.
- 서, 의식; 강, 봉룡 (2002). 뿌리 깊은 한국사 샘이 깊은 이야기 1 : 고조선·삼국 [Deep-rooted Korean History 1 : Gojoseon·Three Kingdoms] (in Korean). 솔. ISBN 978-8981335366.
