= Wiman Chosŏn =

Dynasty of the Gojoseon kingdom of Korea (194–108 BC)

Korean name
- Hangul: 위만조선
- Hanja: 衛滿朝鮮
Transcriptions
- Revised Romanization: Wiman Joseon
- McCune–Reischauer: Wiman Chosŏn

Chinese name
- Traditional Chinese: 衛滿朝鮮
- Simplified Chinese: 卫满朝鲜
Transcriptions
Standard Mandarin
- Hanyu Pinyin: Wèimǎn Cháoxiǎn

Wiman Chosŏn (194–108 BCE) was a dynasty of Old Chosŏn (Gojoseon). It began with Wiman (Wei Man)'s seizure of the throne from King Chun of Old Chosŏn and ended with the death of King Ugŏ, who was Wiman's grandson. Apart from archaeological data, the main source on this historical period comes from chapter 115 of Sima Qian's Shiji. Wiman was originally a Chinese military leader from the Kingdom of Yan under the Han dynasty.

== Founding ==
According to the Shiji and Book of the Later Han, Wiman was a general from the Kingdom of Yan of northeastern China, who submitted to Kija Chosŏn's King Chun after the collapse of the Qin dynasty. Chun accepted and appointed Wiman commander of the western border region of Kija Chosŏn, which probably corresponds to the west of the present-day Liaoning. Despite the generosity that King Chun had demonstrated, Wiman revolted and destroyed Kija Chosŏn. In 194 BCE, he established Wiman Chosŏn and decided to locate his capital in Wanggeom-seong. Many Korean historians believe that the exact location of Wanggeom-seong was in Liaodong, present-day China.

In this period, Wiman Chosŏn expanded to control a vast territory and became strong economically by controlling trade between the Han dynasty and the peoples of Manchuria. The Emperor Wu of Han thought that Wiman Chosŏn increasingly threatened the Han dynasty, and Wiman Chosŏn would ally with the Xiongnu.

== Canghai Commandery ==
Around 128–126 BCE, the Canghai Commandery covered an area in the northern Korea and southern Manchuria; it was centered in what is now South Hamgyong Province. Namnyŏ (남려; 南閭)), who was a monarch of the Eastern Ye and a subject of Wiman Chosŏn, revolted against King Ugŏ, later surrendering to the Han dynasty with 280,000 people. (Note: Book of the Later Han, Treatise on the Dongyi (元朔元年武帝年也., 濊君南閭等【集解】 惠棟曰, 顏籀云, 南閭者, 薉君之名.畔右渠, 率二十八萬口詣遼東內屬, 武帝以其地爲蒼海郡, 數年乃罷.)) The Canghai Commandery was established following this revolution, however, in two years, it was abolished by Gongsun Hong.

== Fall ==
Wiman's grandson, King Ugŏ, allowed many exiles from the Han dynasty to live in Wiman Chosŏn, and with the growth of incoming population from China, King Ugŏ prevented the native Jin state in the south from communicating with the Han dynasty. As a result, in 109 BCE, Emperor Wu of Han invaded Wiman Chosŏn near the Luan River. After failing several times to defeat Wiman Chosŏn's armies, Han Wudi tried to convince the princes of Wiman Chosŏn to kill King Ugŏ. The conspiracy failed, leading to the destruction of Wiman Chosŏn. After the war, the Han Emperor Wudi sentenced two generals to death for failing to defeat Wiman Chosŏn.

After a year of battle, Wanggeom-seong was captured and Wiman Chosŏn was completely destroyed. The Han dynasty established the Four Commanderies of Han in the areas it captured, corresponding to the current area of the Liaodong Peninsula and the northwestern Korea. The Commanderies eventually fell to the rising Goguryeo in the 4th century.

== Maps ==
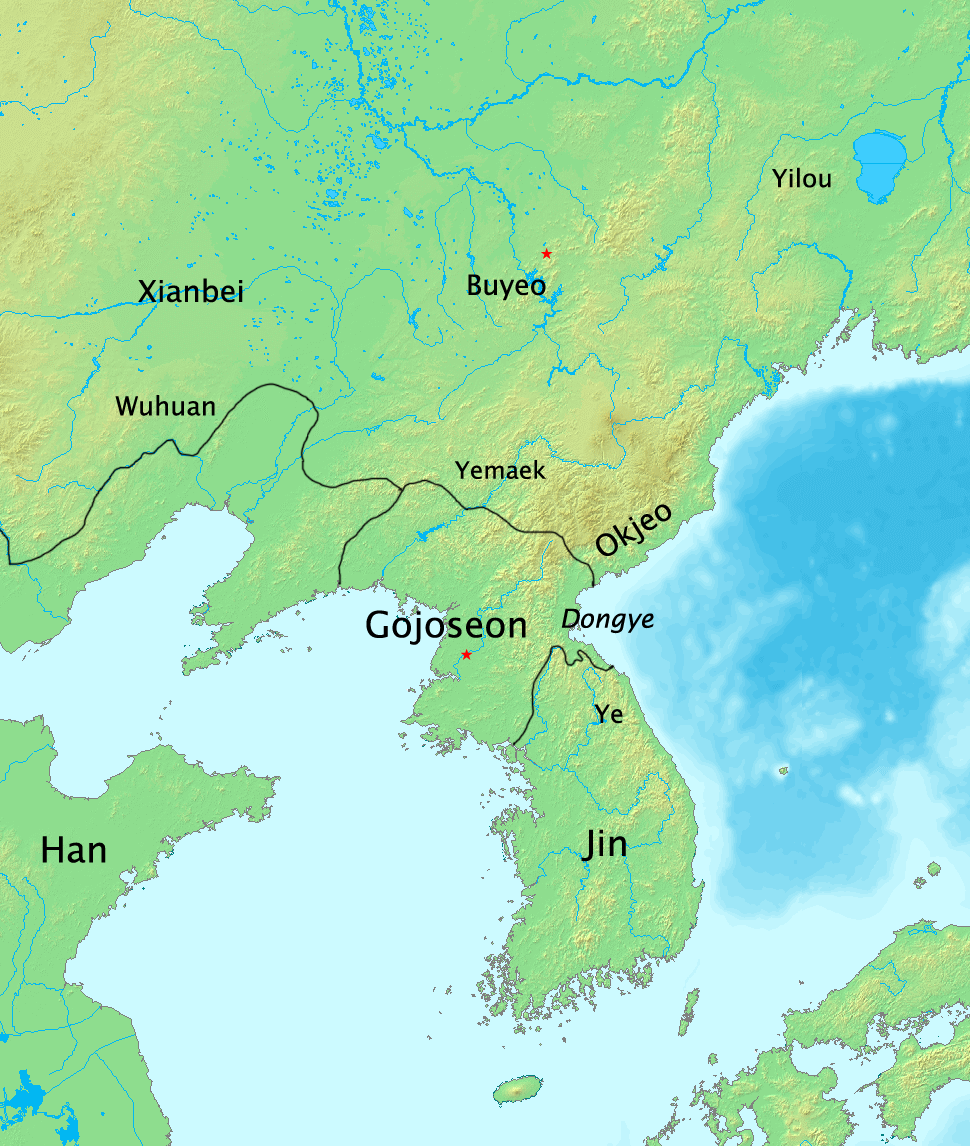
Korea in 108 BCE. Old Chosŏn before destroyed by Han dynasty.

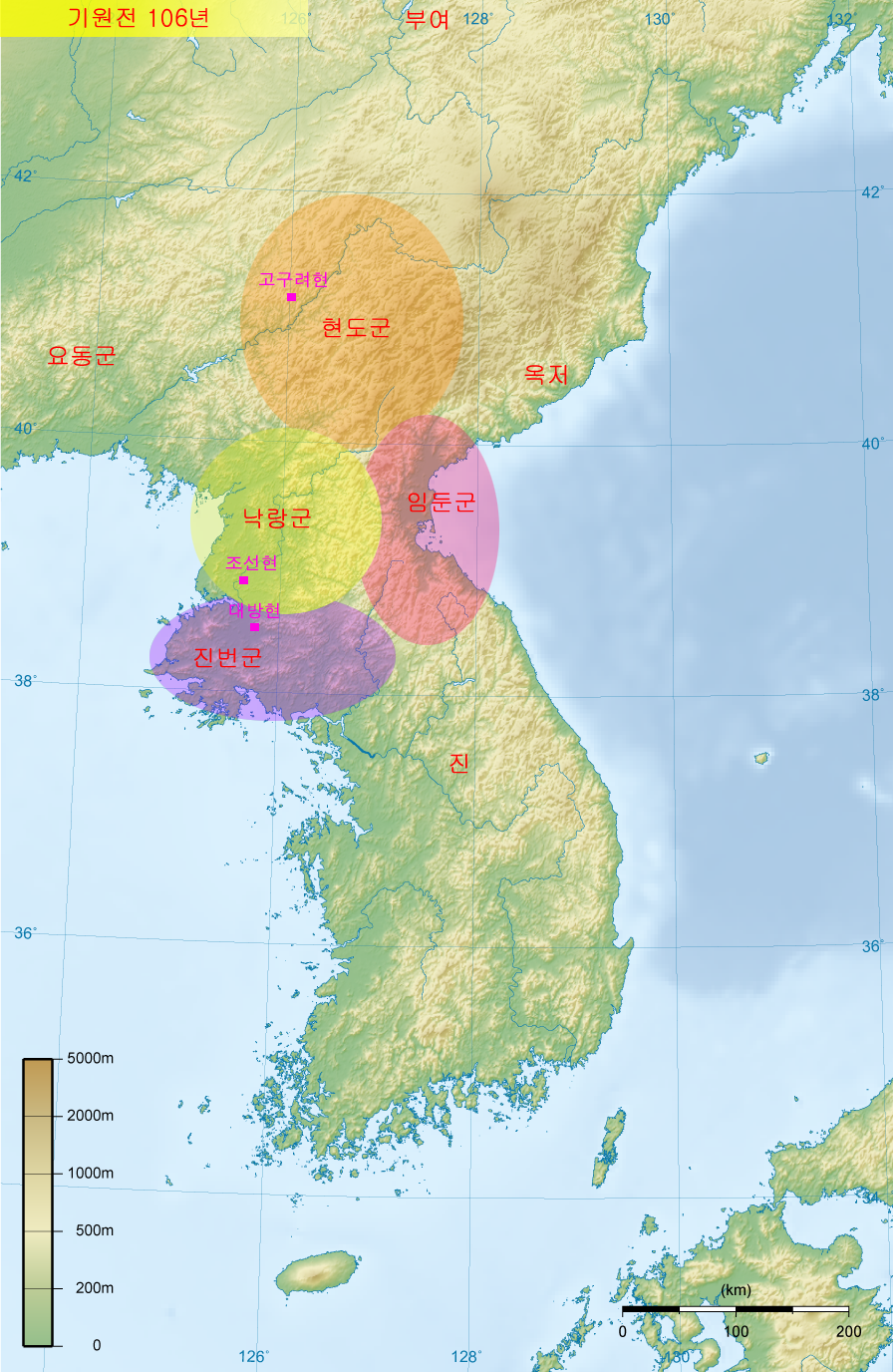
Han dynasty destroys Wiman Chosŏn, and establishing the Four Commanderies.

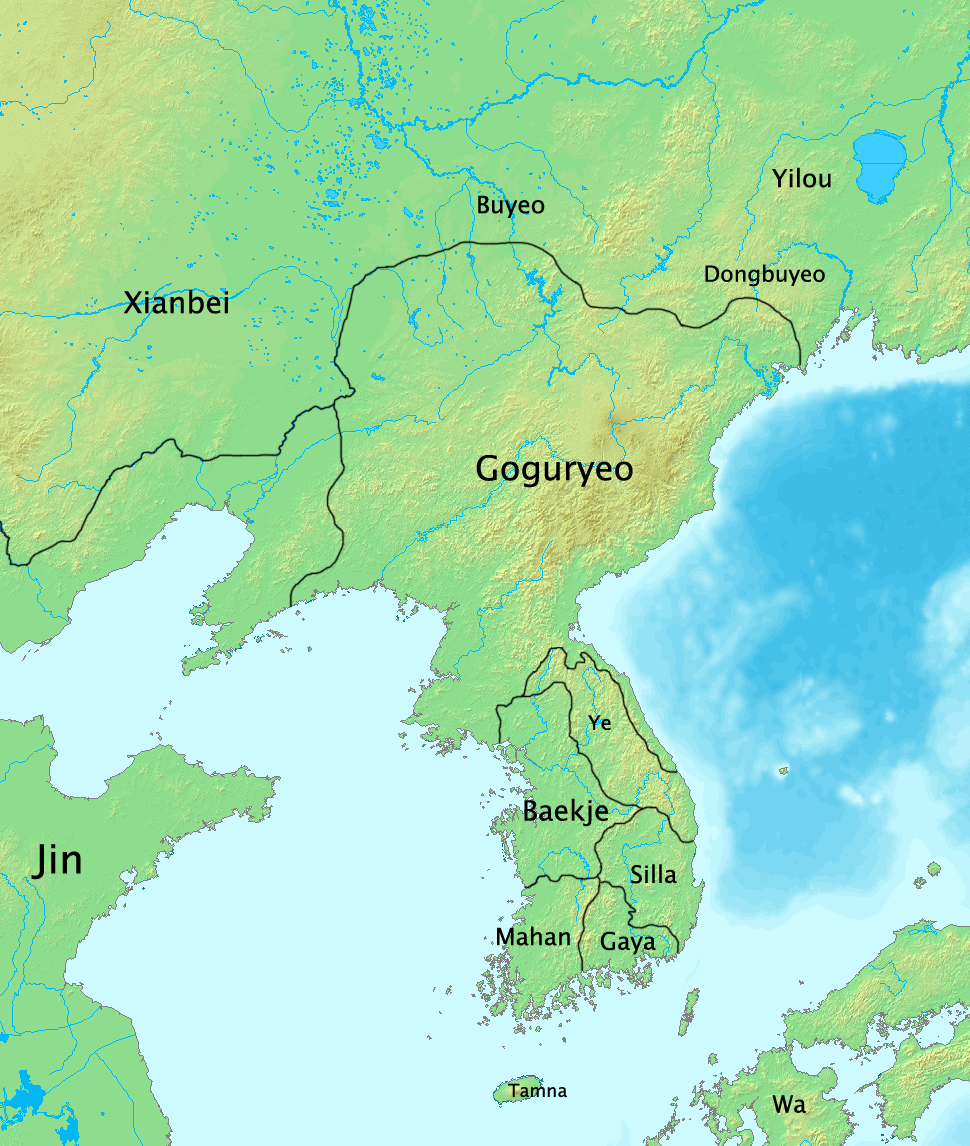
Korea in 315. Goguryeo recovered the former Old Chosŏn territory.

== See also ==
- History of Korea
- History of Manchuria
- List of Korean monarchs

== Bibliography ==
- Cotterell, Arthur (2011). Asia: A Concise History. Singapore: Wiley. ISBN 978-0470825044.
- Kim, Jinwung (2012). A History of Korea: From "Land of the Morning Calm" to States in Conflict. Indiana University Press. ISBN 978-0253000248.
- Tennant, Roger (1996). History Of Korea. Routledge. ISBN 978-0710305329.
- Xu, Stella Yingzi (2007). That glorious ancient history of our nation. University of California, Los Angeles. ISBN 9780549440369.
- Lee, Hyun-Hee; Park, Sung-Soo; Yoon, Nae-Hyun (2005). New History of Korea. Korean Studies Series. Vol. 30. Paju, Gyeonggi: Jimundang. ISBN 978-8-9880-9585-0.
- Peterson, Mark; Margulies, Phillip (2009). A Brief History of Korea. New York: Infobase Publishing. ISBN 978-1-4381-2738-5.
- Sima, Qian; Watson, Burton (1993). Records of the Grand Historian. Vol. Han Dynasty II. Translated by Watson, Burton (Revised ed.). New York: Columbia University Press. ISBN 978-0231081672.
- Yap, Joseph P.; Sima Guang (2009). "Chapter 5. 109 BC". Wars With the Xiongnu: A Translation From Zizhi tongjian. AuthorHouse. ISBN 978-1-4490-0604-4.
