= Tongsa kangmok =

Korean history book written by Ahn Jeong-bok

- Hangul: 동사강목
- Hanja: 東史綱目
- Revised Romanization: Dongsa gangmok
- McCune–Reischauer: Tongsa kangmok

Tongsa kangmok (Compendium of the eastern history) is a Korean history book written by Ahn Jeong-bok (1712–1791). It is composed of 20 volumes and describes from Gojoseon to Goryeo.

The book consists of 17 volumes for the East and 3 volumes for the East. The narrative style is a one-year-old style and is a representative history book of the time of study.

== History ==
In 1756, the author began compiling at the age of 45 and completed the first draft in three years. Afterwards, he exchanged opinions with his teachers and friends in a letter and revised the draft. He completed it in 1778, 22 years after he began compiling.

== Content Configuration ==
The contents of the text were described in 'Gang-Mok' form, with important events marked in a 'Gang', and articles related to them were written down in a 'Mok'. Where his opinions should be put, he wrote two lines of 'An(meaning "look")' and two lines of comments.

=== Opening ===
It contains a legend of the description and a map of the map of Dangun, a map of three last names of Shilla, Goguryeo map, Baekje map, and a map of Goryeo.
