= Ugŏ of Old Chosŏn =

Last King of Wiman Chosŏn (r. ?–108 BC)

Ugŏ

King of Wiman Chosŏn
- Reign: Unknown – 108 BC
- Died: 108 BC; Wanggeom-seong, Wiman Chosŏn
- Issue: Wi Jang
- House: Wi

Korean name
- Hangul: 위우거
- Hanja: 衛右渠
- RR: Wi Ugeo
- MR: Wi Ugŏ

Monarch name
- Hangul: 우거왕
- Hanja: 右渠王
- RR: Ugeowang
- MR: Ugŏwang

Wi Ugŏ (Korean: 위우거; Hanja: 衛右渠, died 108 BC) was the last king of Wiman Chosŏn, the last remnant of Old Chosŏn. He was a grandson of Wiman.

Ugŏ was killed by an assassin sent by a faction advocating surrender against invading Han forces. Even after the death of Ugŏ, Wiman Chosŏn resisted the Han forces until 108 BC but lost and the Four Commanderies of Han were then set up.

== Family ==
- Wiman, grandfather and first king of Wiman Chosŏn
- son and successor, name not recorded
- Wi Jang, son

== Rebellion against Ugŏ ==
Around the period from 128 BC to 126 BC, Canghai Commandery, covering an area in northern Korean Peninsula to southern Manchuria, existed. Nan Lü (南閭), who was a monarch of Dongye and a subject of Wiman Chosŏn, revolted against Ugŏ of Old Chosŏn and then surrendered to the Han dynasty with 280,000 people. (Note: Book of the Later Han, Treatise on the Dongyi, 元朔元年武帝年也., 濊君南閭等【集解】 惠棟曰, 顏籀云, 南閭者, 薉君之名.畔右渠, 率二十八萬口詣遼東內屬, 武帝以其地爲蒼海郡, 數年乃罷.) The Canghai Commandery was established following this revolution, however in 2 years, it was abolished by Gongsun Hong.

== Gallery ==
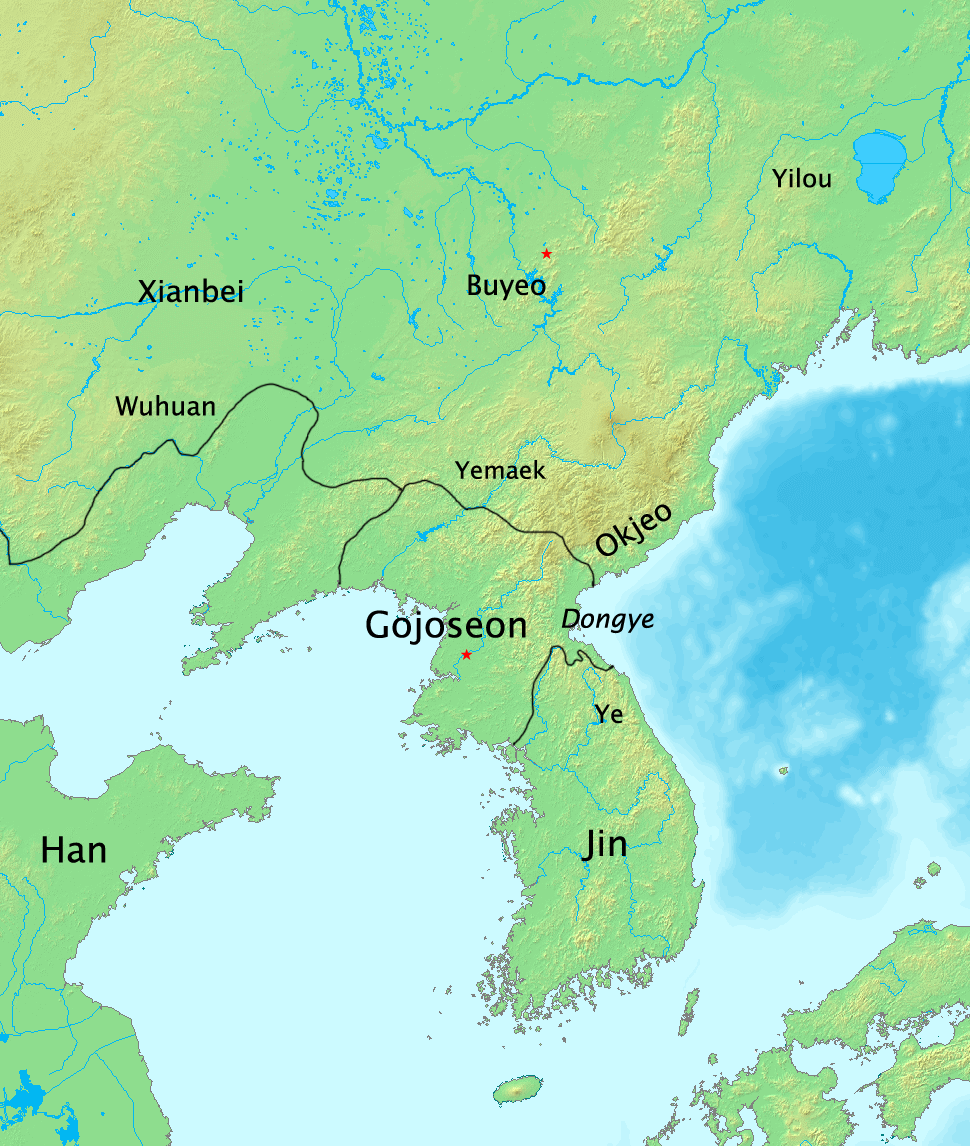
Korea in 108 BC. Wiman Chosŏn before destroyed by Han dynasty.

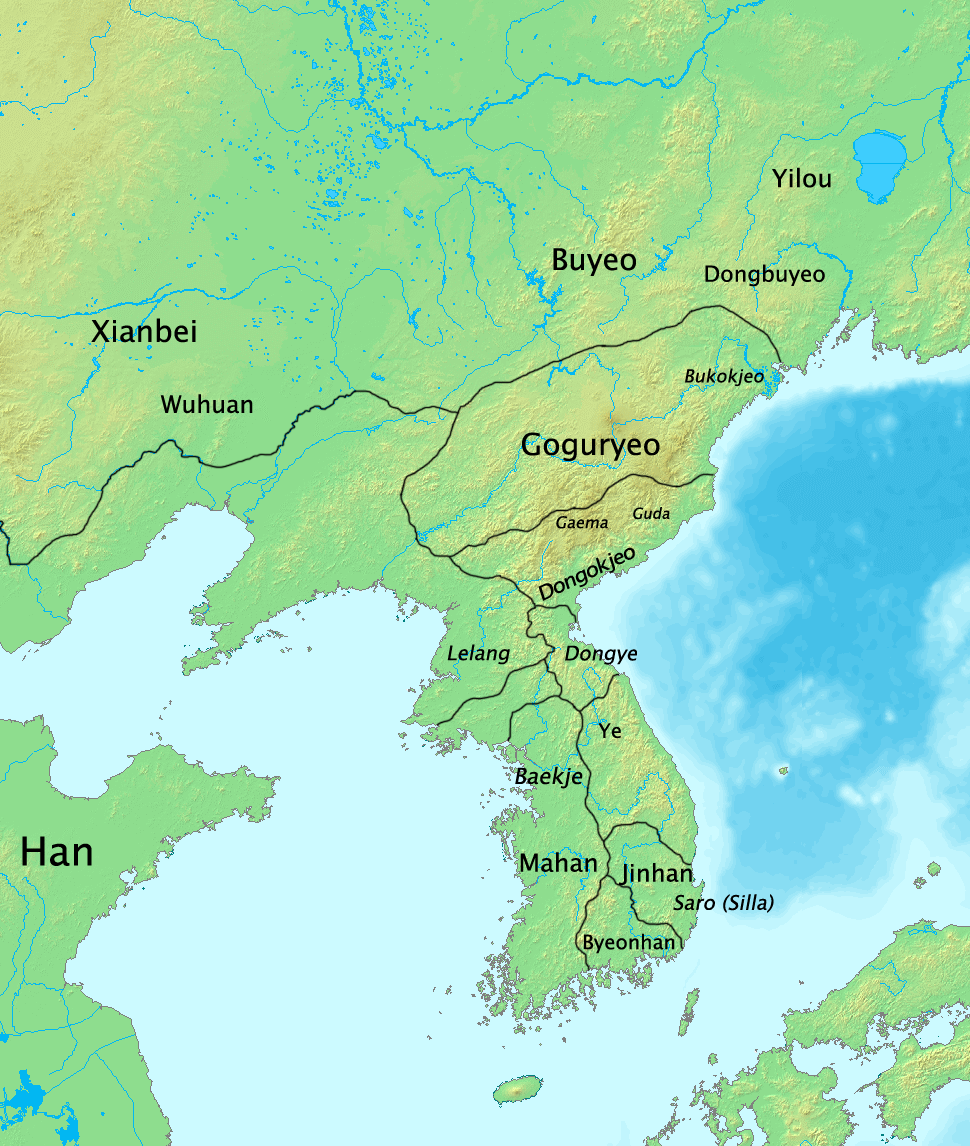
Han dynasty destroys Wiman Chosŏn, and establishing the Four Commanderies.

== See also ==
- Han conquest of Old Chosŏn

== Notes ==
Ugŏ of Old Chosŏn House of Wi
Regnal titles
Unknown Last known title holder: Wiman of Gojoseon	King of Gojoseon c. 129 BC – 108 BC	Vacant Annexed by Western Han
