= Wiman of Old Chosŏn =

First king of Wiman Chosŏn

Wiman
- Illustration of Wiman and his men from Elementary History of Korea (1908)

King of Wiman Chosŏn
- Reign: 194 BCE – Unknown
- Successor: Unknown
- House: Wi

Chinese name
- Traditional Chinese: 衛滿
- Simplified Chinese: 卫满
Transcriptions
Standard Mandarin
- Hanyu Pinyin: Wèi Mǎn
- Wade–Giles: Wei^{4} Man^{3}

Korean name
- Hangul: 위만
- Hanja: 衛滿
Transcriptions
- Revised Romanization: Wi Man
- McCune–Reischauer: Wi Man

Wiman (in Korean) or Wei Man (in Chinese) was the founder and first monarch of the Wiman Chosŏn dynasty of Korea. He was originally a military leader of the Chinese Kingdom of Yan. (Note: Peterson, Mark (2009). Brief History of Korea. Infobase Publishing. p. 6. ISBN 978-1-4381-2738-5.; "The term was used again by a refugee from the Han dynasty named Wiman, who about 200 B.C.E. set up a kingdom in Korea called Wiman Choson.": Cotterell, Arthur (2011). Asia: A Concise History. Wiley. ISBN 978-0470825044.; "The earliest documented event in Korean history involves China. After an unsuccessful rising against the first Han emperor Gaozu, the defeated rebels sought refuge beyond the imperial frontier and one of them Wiman, took control of Choson, a Korean state in the north of the peninsula.": Kim, Jinwung (2012). A History of Korea: From "Land of the Morning Calm" to States in Conflict. Indiana University Press. p. 10. ISBN 978-0253000248.; "For instance, Wiman, a refugee from the Yan dynasty, which then existed around present-day Beijing, led his band of more than 1,000 followers into exile in Old Chosŏn in the early second century bc.": Tennant, Roger (1996). History Of Korea. Routledge. p. 18. ISBN 978-0710305329.; "Retaliation by the Han then brought in refugees from Yan, the most notable of whom was a war lord, Weiman ('Wiman'in Korean), who somewhere about 200 BC led his followers into the territory held by Choson.": Xu, Stella Yingzi (2007). That glorious ancient history of our nation. University of California, Los Angeles. p. 220. ISBN 9780549440369.; "Here, Wiman was described as a "Gu Yanren 故燕人"or a person from former Yan. It is confusing because there were two Yans around this period. The first was the Yan state, which was one of the seven states during the Warring States period, and the second was the vassal state of Yan of the Han dynasty.") When king Lu Wan of Yan was defeated by the Han in 195 BCE, Wiman fled to Old Chosŏn in north-western Korea and later usurped power from its king in 194 BCE, establishing Wiman Chosŏn. Recorded in the Records of the Grand Historian and the Book of Han, Wiman was the first ruler in the history of Korea to have been recorded in documents from the same time period.

== Biography ==
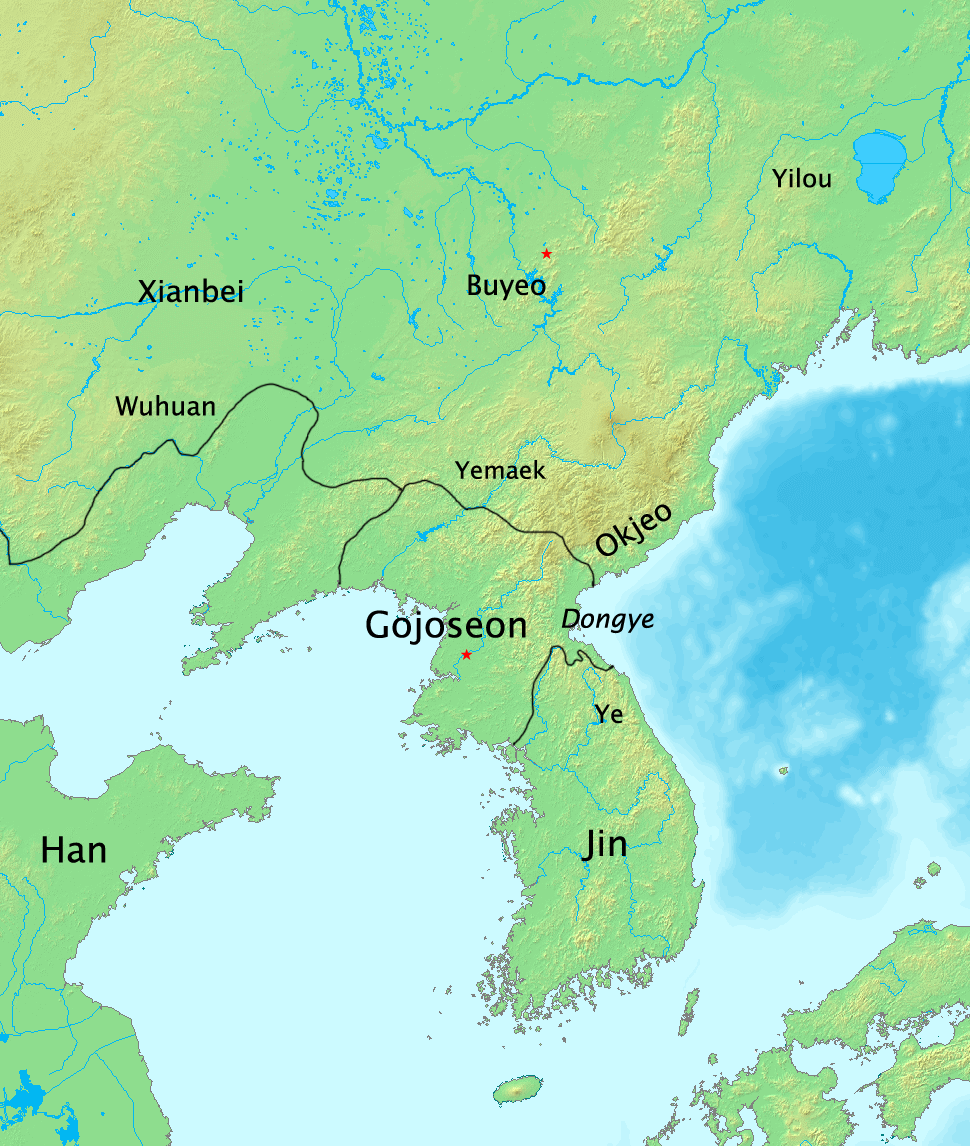
Old Chosŏn at its decline in 108 BCE

After Emperor Gaozu of Han suppressed the rebellion of Zang Tu, king of Yan, he appointed general Lu Wan as Yan's new king. In 196 BC, Emperor Gaozu suspected Lu Wan of plotting rebellion and ordered an attack against Yan. Lu Wan fled to the Xiongnu while his general Wiman (Wei Man) led a thousand followers east to Old Chosŏn.

According to the Book of the Later Han's chapter regarding the Dongyi of ancient China, Wiman was initially ordered to fortify Old Chosŏn's northwestern border by Chun of Kija Chosŏn, however with the help of Yan refugees, Wiman usurped the throne (194–180 BCE). Supposedly, King Chun fled to Mahan and called himself the "King of Han (韓王)" though it is not accepted by modern Korean historians (see Mahan confederacy's misconceptions). However, due to the existence of Kija Chosŏn (first mentioned in Shiji and later in the Book of the Later Han) itself being scrutinized by Korean and Japanese historians, the claim (due to the nature of its connection to Kija Chosŏn) is also often scrutinized, as in native Korean records, no king named "Chun" is found in any of the genealogy.

Wiman's capital of Old Chosŏn was Wanggeom-seong, generally identified as Pyongyang. Since the Han dynasty was not completely stabilized yet, the governor of Liaodong appointed Wiman as an outer subject, provided that he did not prevent natives going up to the empire. The appointment is dated at 191 or 192 BCE. Having superior military strength, Wiman Chosŏn was able to subjugate the neighboring Jinbeon kingdom (진번; 眞番國; not to be confused with Zhenfan Commandery) and Imdun kingdom (임둔국; 臨屯國; not to be confused with Lintun Commandery), vastly extending its borders. His kingdom was eventually conquered by Emperor Wu of Han in 108 BCE during the reign of Ugŏ of Old Chosŏn.

== Family ==
- Son and successor: name not recorded, second king of Wiman Chosŏn
  - Grandson: Ugŏ, last king of Wiman Chosŏn
    - Great-grandson: Wi Jang (衛長),

== Sources ==
- Mikami Tsugio 三上次男: Kodai no seihoku Chōsen to Ei-shi Chōsen koku no seiji, shakaiteki seikaku 古代の西北朝鮮と衛氏朝鮮国の政治・社会的性格, Kodai Tōhoku Ajiashi Kenkyū 古代東北アジア史研究, pp. 3–22, 1966.
- Ibaragi Kazuo 荊木計男: Ei Man Chōsen ō Sakuhō ni tsuite 衛満朝鮮冊封について, Chōsen Gakuhō 朝鮮学報 (Journal of the Academic Association of Koreanology in Japan) Vol. 113, pp. 1–25, 1984.
- Tani Toyonobu 谷豊信: Rakurō-gun no ichi 楽浪郡の位置, Chōsen shi kenkyūkai ronbunshū 朝鮮史研究会論文集 (Bulletin of Society for Study in Korean History), No 24, pp. 23–45, 1987.

Wiman of Old Chosŏn House of Wi
Regnal titles
Preceded by Jun of Gojoseon	King of Gojseon; 194 BC – c. 161 BC	Unknown Next known title holder: Ugeo
