= Wi Jang of Gojoseon =

Prince of Wiman Joseon (fl. 2nd century BC)

- Hangul: 위장항
- Hanja: 衛長降
- Revised Romanization: Wi Janghang
- McCune–Reischauer: Wi Janghang

Wi Janghang (Korean: 위장항; Hanja: 衛長降) was a prince of Ugeo (the last king of Wiman Joseon). At that time, Emperor Wu of Han sent warrior to surrender Wiman Joseon and his father, Ugeo, was killed by an assassin. Even after the king's death, some ministers resisted against the Han dynasty. The Han dynasty made Wi Janghang who already surrendered to kill those ministers and subdued Wiman Joseon.

After the surrender, he was appointed to the Marquis of Ji (Hanja:幾侯) by the Han dynasty, but in two years he was executed for rebellion.

== Family ==
- Wi Man (Hanja:衛満), great-grandfather
- Ugeo (Hanja:右渠), father and last king of Wiman Joseon

== Gallery ==
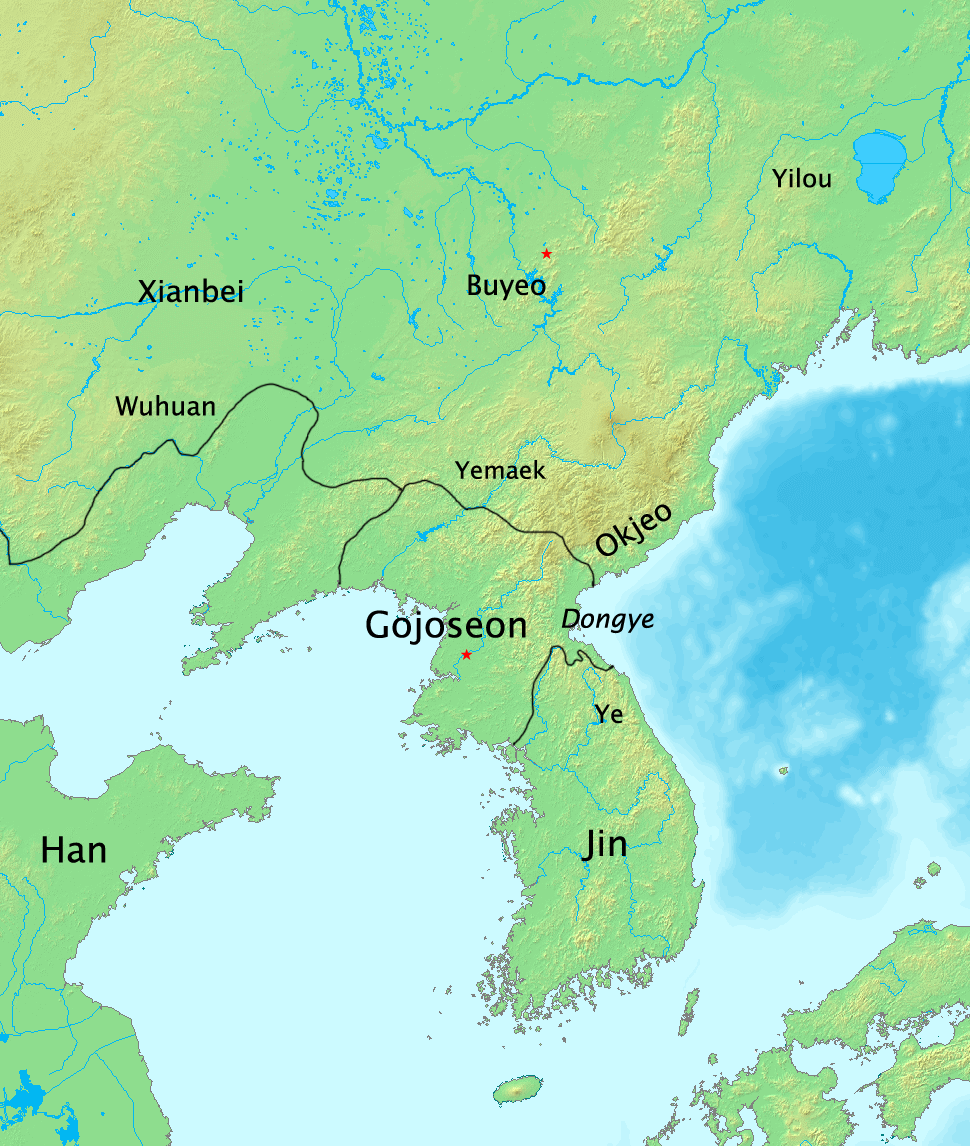
Korea in 108 BC. Wiman Joseon before being destroyed by Han dynasty

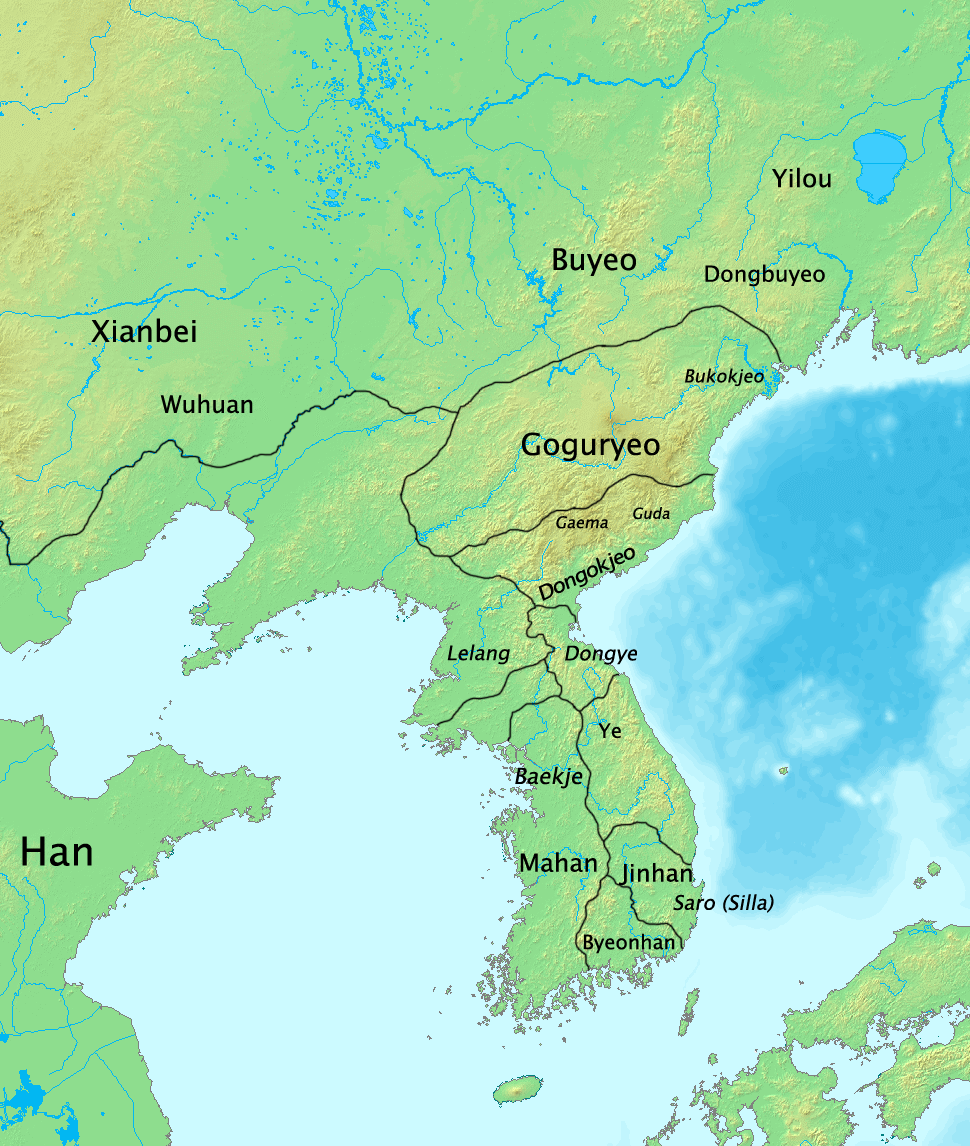
Han dynasty destroys Wiman Joseon, establishing the Four Commanderies of Han

== See also ==
- Han conquest of Gojoseon
