= Eight Prohibitions =

Ancient Chinese criminal law

- Hangul: 범금팔조; 팔조지교; 팔조법
- Hanja: 犯禁八条, 八条之敎, 八條法
- RR: Beomgeumpaljo; Paljojigyo; Paljobeop
- MR: Pŏmgŭmp'alcho; P'alchojigyo; P'alchopŏp

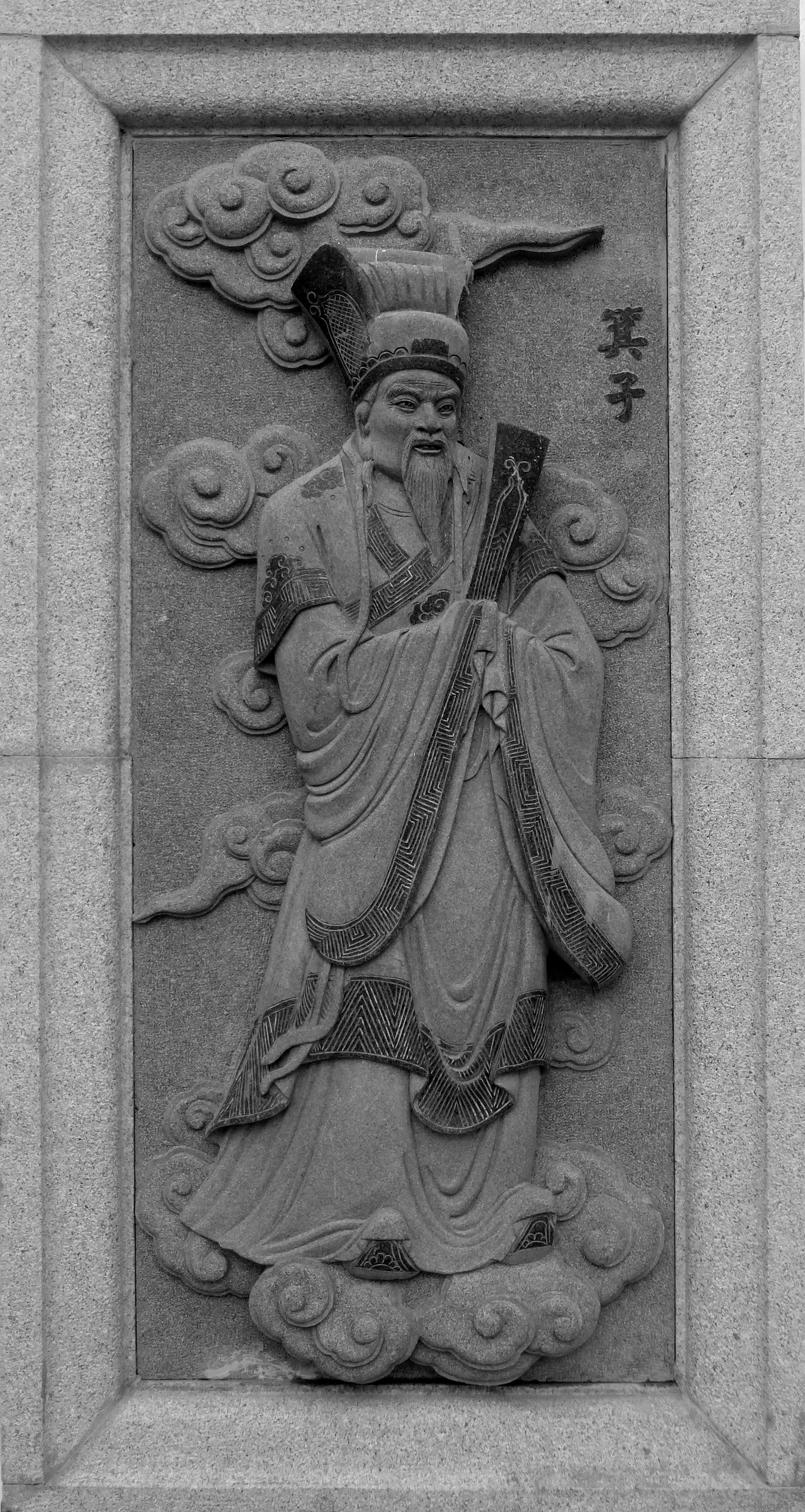
Jizi

Eight Prohibitions (Korean: 범금팔조), also called Paljojigyo (팔조지교; Chinese: 八條之敎; pinyin: Bā tiáo zhī jiào) or Paljobeop (팔조법; Chinese: 八條法; pinyin: Bā tiáo fǎ) is a criminal law. When people from the Shang dynasty migrated to the Korean peninsula and established Gija Joseon, the sage politician Jizi from the Shang dynasty enacted this law to educate and strengthen the Korean people. This law was made up of eight prohibitions regarding etiquette, agriculture, rice farming, sericulture and weaving.

== Contents ==
Although not all of the 8 prohibitions are known, the known part is as follows.

- Those who commit murder shall be put to death immediately. (Note: Book of Han, Treatise on Geography,"相殺以當時償殺".)
- Those who cause injury must compensate with grain. (Note: Book of Han, Treatise on Geography,"相傷以穀償")
- Those who steal will be enslaved or pay recompense. (Note: Book of Han, Treatise on Geography,"相盜者男沒入爲其家奴女子爲婢, 欲自贖者人五十萬".)
