= Wanggeom-seong =

Capital of Gojoseon

- Hangul: 왕검성
- Hanja: 王儉城/王險城
- RR: Wanggeomseong
- MR: Wanggŏmsŏng

Wanggeom-seong (Korean: 왕검성) was the capital city of Old Chosŏn from 194 to 108 BC. It is also known as Wangheom-seong (Korean: 왕험성; Hanja: 王險城).

== Conflicting opinions about its location ==
One theory suggests the capital was around the modern city of Pyongyang based on the records of Samguk yusa and Samguk sagi. (Note: Samguk yusa writes that the Book of Wei writes Dangun set the capital of his kingdom in asadal, and also quotes from a lost history book called gogi(古記) that Dangun selected Pyongyang as the nation's capital.) Other sources suggest it was located somewhere around Liaodong (present China).

== See also ==
- Asadal, the mythical capital of Gojoseon, believed to be founded by Dangun
