= No Ch'oe =

Wiman Chosŏn bureaucrat (fl. 2nd century BC)

- Hangul: 노최
- Hanja: 路最
- RR: No Choe
- MR: No Ch'oe

No Ch'oe (Korean: 노최; Hanja: 路最) was a son of No In who was one of the four members (No In, Han Ŭm, Sam and Wang Kyŏp) who operated the government of Wiman Chosŏn.

== Biography ==
Since his father No In had a family name, it Is believed that he was an exile from China or person related to China. Just like his master Ugŏ who was the last king of Wiman Chosŏn. In BC 109 to 108, when Han dynasty attacked Wiman Chosŏn, his father was surrendered instantly together with Han Eum and Wang Gyeop while leaving the King of Wiman Chosŏn Ugŏ. Next year, Sam who resisted Han dynasty sent an assassin and killed Ugŏ. After Uego’s death, some ministers still resisted to Han dynasty, but Han dynasty sent Wi Chang, who was a son of Ugŏ and No Ch'oe to kill those ministries. And made them surrendered to Han dynasty. No Ch'oe himself was given preferential treatment by Han dynasty because his father No In had died when he was on the way to surrender. He was nominated as a peerage of Nieyang (涅陽) but Nieyang was abolished in 5 years because there was no successor.

== Family ==
- Father: No In

== See also ==
- Han conquest of Gojoseon

== Source ==
- Yukio Takeda (1997). 隋唐帝国と古代朝鮮 世界の歴史6. Chuokoron-Shinsha. ISBN 978-4124034066.
- National Institute of Korean History. 漢書>朝鮮傳>古朝鮮>左將軍이 이미 두 군대를 합병한 뒤.註 042
