= Bangiku =

Bangiku may refer to:

- Bangiku (short story), a 1948 short story by Japanese writer Fumiko Hayashi
- Late Chrysanthemums (1954 film), a Japanese film based on Hayashi's story
- Bangiku (1960 TV film), a Japanese TV film based on Hayashi's story
