= No In =

- Hangul: 노인
- Hanja: 路人
- RR: No In
- MR: No In

No In (Korean: 노인; Hanja: 路人) was one of the four members (No In, Han Eum, Sam and Wang Gyeop) who operated the government of Wiman Joseon. His position was a chancellor and he was in charge of politics of Wiman Joseon. Since No In had a family name, it is believed that he was an exile from China or person related to China. Just like his master Ugeo who was the last king of Wiman Joseon. In BC 109 to 108, when Han dynasty attacked Wiman Joseon, he was surrendered instantly together with those exiles from China, Han Eum and Wang Gyeop while leaving the King of Wiman Joseon Ugeo. He died on the way to surrender. Even after Uego's death, some ministers of Wiman Joseon resisted to Han dynasty. Han dynasty sent Wi Jang and No Choe then killed those ministers. Choe was a son of No In.

== Family ==
- Son: No Choe

== See also ==
- Han conquest of Gojoseon

== Sources ==
- Yukio Takeda (1997). 隋唐帝国と古代朝鮮 世界の歴史6. Chuokoron-Shinsha. ISBN 978-4124034066.
- National Institute of Korean History. 漢書>朝鮮傳>古朝鮮>左將軍이 이미 두 군대를 합병한 뒤.註 042
