= Crimson (Sata novel) =

1936 Japanese novel

- Author: Ineko Sata
- Original title: Kurenai
- Translator: Yukiko Tanaka (1987); Samuel Perry (2016)
- Language: Japanese
- Genre: I-novel
- Publisher: Fujin Kōron; Chūō Kōron; Chūōkōron-sha (book)
- Publication date: 1936–1938
- Publication place: Japan
- English publication date: 1987, 2016
- Media type: Print

Crimson (Japanese: くれなゐ, Hepburn: Kurenai) is an autobiographical novel (Note: Crimson is referred to either as a novella (Perry, Smith, Tanaka) or a novel (Fairbanks, Gössmann, Lee, Suzuki), depending on the source.) by Japanese writer Ineko Sata first published between 1936 and 1938. It is regarded as one of Sata's most important works.

== Plot ==
After the return of her husband Kōsuke from a prison sentence for his left-wing activities, Akiko Kakimura, a writer and political activist like Kōsuke, is facing constant struggles while trying to maintain her role as a mother, wife, and professional writer supporting her family. For a while, she moves into a flat in the working class district of Koto-ku, Tokyo, eager to keep the connection to "the masses" she writes about, but later returns to the family home in Totsuka. In a time of governmental political oppression, Akiko is herself arrested, spending 40 days in custody, just after her close friend Kishiko. Upon her release, the conflicts between her and Kōsuke, both struggling for their own private and working space, increase. One day, Kōsuke announces that he has fallen in love with another woman and wants to move in with her. The couple decides to separate, but remain in the family register together. When Akiko declares that she does not want any more intimacy between herself and her husband, Kōsuke rapes her. Shortly after, his affair ends, and Akiko and Kōsuke refrain from their intended separation, which they make public in the press. Still, their marital conflicts persist.

== Biographical background ==
Crimson is set in 1935 Japan, a time of fierce governmental oppression of socialist and communist movements. The Japan Proletarian Writers Alliance, which Sata and her husband Tsurujirō Kubokawa had belonged to, had dissolved the previous year, the Japanese Communist Party had already been outlawed in 1932. Like the main characters Akiko and Kōsuke, Sata and her husband had been under arrest and in prison for their activities at different times. Other characters in the book are based on actual persons as well, like Yuriko Miyamoto (Kishiko in the novella), Sakae Tsuboi and Shigeharu Nakano.

On 1 September 1935, the Tokyo Nichi Nichi Shimbun had publicised the dissolution of Sata's and Kubokawa's marriage. The couple published a series of articles, each giving their own view of the story, published in the magazine Fujin Kōron. Sata declared that she and Kubokawa would separate, but remain married, and that she planned to publish a novel on the difficulties of contemporary women with combining a job and family life.

Already at the time of the press coverage, Kubokawa's extramarital affair had ended and the possibility of a divorce been suspended. Sata would eventually divorce her husband in 1945.

== Publication history and legacy ==
Crimson appeared in five installments in Fujin Kōron between January and May 1936. An additional chapter appeared in the magazine Chūō Kōron in 1938. Also in 1938, the novel was published in book form by Chūōkōron-sha. For these publications, Sata used her then pen name Ineko Kubokawa.

Crimson was praised by writer Shigeharu Nakano upon its initial appearance for its theme of women's liberation and gender struggles. Translator Hilaria Gössmann (in the 1990 German edition) saw signs of self-censorship on Sata's side by carefully avoiding terms like "the proletariat" or the mentioning of the Japan Proletarian Writers Alliance; instead, Sata only refers to "the masses" (大衆, taishū) or "the alliance" (同盟, dōmei). In her essay on Crimson, Juhee Lee pointed out that the novel has even been read as Sata's tenkō, her ideological conversion. In the same year of the appearance of the book's final chapter, Sata published an article which advocated both women's career ambitions and her nation's expansive foreign policy.

The novel was received favourably after its first post-war publication in 1953. Since then, it has been read as a feminist text, among others by critic Kenkichi Yamamoto, who reviewed Sata's book by referring to Virginia Woolf, or as a turning point in revolutionary literature (and in Sata's career) by exploring the dynamics of domesticity from a female perspective. In his introduction to the 2016 English edition, Samuel Perry saw Crimson in the tradition of works by woman writers like Shikin Shimizu, Noe Itō and Yuriko Miyamoto, and in the I-novel.

== Translations ==
Crimson was published in an English translation provided by Samuel Perry in 2016. A partial translation had previously been published in 1987, provided by Yukiko Tanaka.
