= Takako Takahashi =

Japanese author

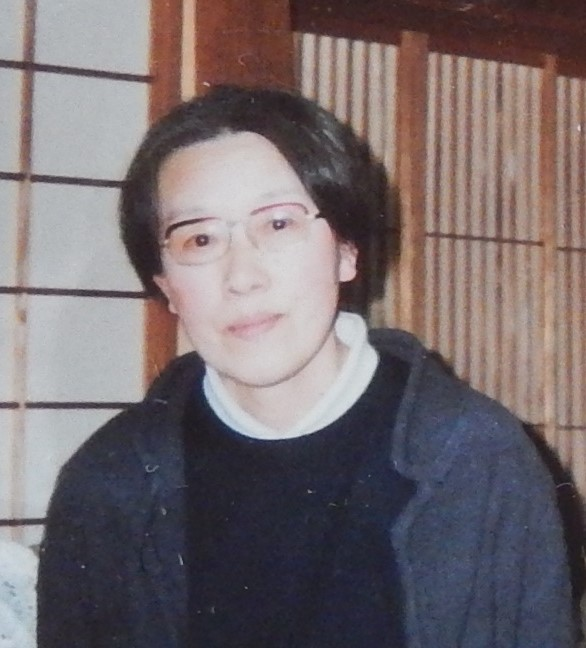

Takako Takahashi (高橋 たか子, Takahashi Takako; March 2, 1932 – July 12, 2013) was a Japanese author. Her maiden name was Takako Okamoto (岡本和子, Okamoto Takako).

== Biography ==
Takahashi was born in Kyoto, as the only child of well-to-do parents, with the maiden name of Okamoto. In 1954 she received her undergraduate degree from Kyoto University in French literature, with a senior thesis on Charles Baudelaire. Six months later she married fellow student Kazumi Takahashi, subsequently a well-known writer and ideological leader of the student protest movement. She supported him in the first two years of their marriage by a series of odd jobs, then returned to Kyoto University in 1956 to receive a master's degree in French literature in 1958 for a thesis on François Mauriac.

From 1958 to 1965, Takahashi and her husband lived in Osaka, where she began a first novel in 1961 (“A Ruined Landscape”). Her husband won a major literary award in 1962, making his name and providing sufficient funds so that Takahashi could quit her job, work on her novel, and publish a translation of Mauriac's Thérèse Desqueyroux. In 1965 they moved to Kamakura, Kanagawa, when her husband obtained a teaching position at Meiji University; in 1967, when he became a professor at Kyoto University, she remained in Kamakura. When her husband fell ill with colon cancer in 1969, he returned to Kamakura where she took care of him.

After her husband's early death in 1971, Takahashi began writing short stories and novels, as well as a memoir of her husband, and translations of French literature. In the 1970s she was both prolific and successful as an author, publishing four novels and eight collections of short stories. In 1972, she received the Tamura Toshiko Literary Award for Sora no hate made (“To the end of the Sky”). She subsequently won the Women's Literature Award in 1977 for a set of linked short stories titled Ronri Uman (“Lonely Woman”) and the Yomiuri Prize for Ikari no ko (“Child of Rage”) in 1985, and the Mainichi Art Award for Kirei na hito (“Pretty Person”) in 2003.

In 1975 Takahashi converted to Roman Catholicism and, in 1980, moved to France, where in 1985 she became a nun. After returning to Japan, she entered a Carmelite convent but left after one year, returning to Kyoto to take care of her mother. She continued to publish prolifically.

== English translations ==
- Congruent Figures (Sōjikei). In Japanese Women Writers: Twentieth Century Short Fiction, translated by Noriko Mizuta Lippit and Kyoko Iriye Selden (Armonk, NY: M.E. Sharpe, 1991)
- Doll Love (Ningyō ai), translated by Mona Nagai and Yukiko Tanaka. In This Kind of Woman: Ten Stories by Japanese Women Writers, 1960-1976, ed. Yukiko Tanaka and Elizabeth Hanson (Stanford: Stanford University Press, 1982), 197–223.
- Endless Encounters (Owarinaki deai), translated by Maryellen Toman Mori. In Mirror, Gems, and Veil: The Life and Writings of Takahashi Takako (1932-2013). Lewiston, New York: The Edwin Mellen Press, 2018.
- Haze (Ikari no ko), a novel translated by Maryellen Toman Mori. In Mirror, Gems, and Veil (cited above).
- Holy Terror (Kodomo-sama) and A Boundless Void (Byōbo), translated by Amanda Seaman. In The Massachusetts Review 51/3 (Fall 2010): 439-55 and 456–81.
- Lonely Woman, a collection of five short stories by Takahashi Takako, translated by Maryellen Toman Mori. New York: Columbia University Press, 2004. The stories are "Lonely Woman" (Ronrī ūman), "The Oracle" (Otsuge), "Foxfire" (Kitsunebi), "The Suspended Bridge" (Tsuribashi), and "Strange Bonds" (Fushigi na en).
- An Old City (Mukashi no machi), translated by Maryellen Toman Mori. In Mirror, Gems, and Veil (cited above).
