= Han Ŭm =

Wiman Chosŏn bureaucrat (fl. 2nd century BC)

- Hangul: 한음
- Hanja: 韓陰
- RR: Han Eum
- MR: Han Ŭm

Alternate name
- Hangul: 한도
- Hanja: 韓陶
- RR: Han Do
- MR: Han To

Han Ŭm (Korean: 한음; Hanja: 韓陰) also known as Han To (한도; 韓陶) was one of the four members (No In, Han Ŭm, Sam and Wang Kyŏp) who operated the government of Wiman Joseon. His position was a chancellor. Since Han Ŭm had a family name, Han, it is believed that he was an exile from China or person related to China. Just like his master Ugŏ who was the last king of Wiman Chosŏn. In BC 109 to 108, when Han dynasty attacked Wiman Chosŏn, he was surrendered instantly together with those exiles from China, No In and Wang Kyŏp, while leaving the King of Wiman Chosŏn Ugŏ. After his surrender, Han dynasty nominated him as a peerage of Jeok ja (적자; 荻苴. He died after 19 years without a successor.

== See also ==
- Han conquest of Gojoseon

== Sources ==
- Yukio Takeda (1997). 隋唐帝国と古代朝鮮 世界の歴史6. Chuokoron-Shinsha. ISBN 978-4124034066.
- National Institute of Korean History. 漢書>朝鮮傳>古朝鮮>左將軍이 이미 두 군대를 합병한 뒤.註 042
