= Wang Kyŏp =

2nd century BC Korean politician

- Hangul: 왕겹
- Hanja: 王唊
- RR: Wang Gyeop
- MR: Wang Kyŏp

Wang Kyŏp (Korean: 왕겹; Hanja: 王唊) was one of the four members (No In, Han Ŭm, Sam and Wang Kyŏp) who operated the government of Wiman Chosŏn. His position was a general. Since Wang Kyŏp had a family name, it is believed that he was an exile from China or person related to China. Just like his master Ugŏ who was the last king of Wiman Chosŏn. He was in charge of military affairs.

In BC 109 to 108, when Han dynasty attacked Wiman Chosŏn, he was surrendered instantly together with No In and Han Eum while leaving the King of Wiman Chosŏn Ugŏ. After their surrender, he was nominated as a peerage of Ping Zhou (平州) by Han dynasty, but died after one year without successor. Ping Zhou was abolished after his death.

== See also ==
- Han conquest of Gojoseon

== Sources ==
- Yukio Takeda (1997). 隋唐帝国と古代朝鮮 世界の歴史6. Chuokoron-Shinsha. ISBN 978-4124034066.
- National Institute of Korean History. 漢書>朝鮮傳>古朝鮮>左將軍이 이미 두 군대를 합병한 뒤.註 042
