= Sam of Old Chosŏn =

Wiman Chosǒn politician

- Hangul: 삼
- Hanja: 參
- Revised Romanization: Sam
- McCune–Reischauer: Sam

Sam (Korean: 삼; Hanja: 參) was one of the four members (alongside No In, Han Ŭm and Wang Kyŏp) who operated the government of Wiman Chosŏn. He was a chancellor of Nigye (니계; 尼谿) and it was where he based himself. He was the only one who did not have a family name among the 4 members. In BC 109 to 108, when the Han dynasty attacked Wiman Chosŏn, those three exiles from China, No In, Han Ŭm and Wang Kyŏp surrendered instantly, leaving the King Ugŏ and Sam as the only ones to resist against the Han. However, in BC 108, Sam sent an assassin to Ugŏ, killed him and surrendered to the Han dynasty. After his surrender, he was nominated for a peerage of hwaecheong (홰청; 澅清) by the Han dynasty. 11 years later, he was arrested on suspicion of hiding the fugitive from Wiman Chosŏn and died of illness while he was in prison.

== See also ==
- Han conquest of Gojoseon

== Sources ==
- Yukio Takeda (1997). 隋唐帝国と古代朝鮮 世界の歴史6. Chuokoron-Shinsha. ISBN 978-4124034066.
- National Institute of Korean History. 漢書>朝鮮傳>古朝鮮>左將軍이 이미 두 군대를 합병한 뒤.註 042
