= List of The Rose of Versailles episodes =

This is a list of episodes of The Rose of Versailles anime series, based on the manga of the same title by Riyoko Ikeda. The anime was directed by Tadao Nagahama and Osamu Dezaki. The series consists of 40 episodes and 1 recapitulation. The anime was first aired in Japan on the channel Nippon Television from 10 October 1979 to 3 September 1980. The series has been re-released on laserdisc. It was released on DVD in 2005 as part of a revival of The Rose of Versailles coinciding with the 250th anniversary of Marie Antoinette's birth.

The production staff included the most recognized animation professionals then, who contributed in the making of the 40 episodes of the anime. In spite of the difficulties they had to go through, the staff could continue with their work and took advantage of these problems. The most important of these incidents was the change of direction at the middle of the project, which marked a notable difference between the first half of the anime (directed by Tadao Nagahama) and the second one (directed by Osamu Dezaki). Shingo Araki was the animation director and co-character designer along with Akio Sugino and Michi Himeno. Kōji Makaino was in charge of the soundtrack.

== Episode list ==
No.	Title	Original release date
1	"Oscar! the Destiny of a Rose"; Transliteration: "Osukaru! bara no sadame" (Japanese: オスカル! バラの運命)	October 10, 1979
Oscar François de Jarjayes is born. Due to her father's strong desire for a son, she is raised as a boy. At the age of 14, she declines an offer to become Commander of the Royal Guard and watch over Marie Antoinette due to her dislike for "babysitting" and a lingering desire to live as a woman, but she accepts after defeating contender Girodelle in a duel and a fight and talk with her servant and best friend, Andre Grandier. (In the manga, Oscar is promoted to Commander before she graduates from military academy and is proud of this accomplishment, accepting it without worry.)
2	"Fly! An Austrian Butterfly"; Transliteration: "Mae! Ōsutoria no choo" (Japanese: 舞え!オーストリアの蝶)	October 17, 1979
Marie Antoinette arrives in France, but she is shocked that she must give up anything that ties her to her homeland, including her mother's prized ring. An imposter, paid by the Duke Orleans, disguises her as a maid, informing her that she can go home, but some men, loyal to Orleans, attempt to kill her. Oscar foils the plot, but is disturbed when Orleans kills the imposter, thus having no evidence of the Duke being a player in the plot. Marie Antoinette meets her future husband, Louis Auguste, but is deeply unsatisfied.
3	"A Spark in Versailles"; Transliteration: "Berusaiyu ni hibana chiru" (Japanese: ベルサイユに火花散る)	October 24, 1979
Antoinette meets and instantly dislikes the king's mistress Madame Du Barry for being a former prostitute and commoner. She talks to every other lady in the court except for her, invoking DuBarry's wrath and making the two of them enemies from then on out. The entire court soon hears of this vendetta and begins taking sides. Duke Orleans takes this opportunity to strike an alliance with Du Barry; as the Dauphin's cousin, he would become heir to the throne if Louis XVI and Antoinette were to die. Oscar decides to remain neutral, but Du Barry sends her mother an invitation to become her lady-in-waiting, forcing the Jarjayes family into dangerous court intrigue against Oscar's will.
4	"Rose, Wine, and Conspiracy..."; Transliteration: "Bara to sake to takurami to..." (Japanese: バラと酒とたくらみと...)	October 31, 1979
Antoinette sends her own invitation to Madame Jarjayes in order to counteract Du Barry's. Both know that the one to get the Jarjayes' on their side will be more popular, as Oscar is highly liked in court. Not wanting her mother to be caught in the vendetta, but ordered by the King to make a decision, Oscar decides to send her mother to be Antoinette's lady-in-waiting because a future queen's power would be more permanent than a courtesan's. Du Barry is enraged by this, and pesters the King until he gives the Dauphine a warning to improve her behavior. Meanwhile, Empress Maria Theresa sends Count Mercy to France as Antoinette's advisor. Mercy writes to the Empress about the Dauphine's struggle with Du Barry, who begins to worry about the alliance between France and Austria and orders Antoinette to talk to Du Barry. She ignores this order. Duke Orleans gives Du Barry a poison to use however she desires. She decides to stage an attempted poisoning and frame Antoinette and Madame Jarjayes as the culprits, but Oscar uncovers the plot and stops her with threats.
5	"Tears with Dignity"; Transliteration: "Kedakasa o namida ni komete" (Japanese: 高貴さを涙にこめて)	November 7, 1979
Du Barry fakes crying to get the King enraged at Antoinette and plots with Orleans to get Prince Louis killed in a hunting "accident". The plot fails when Louis drops the rigged gun on the ground, causing it to harmlessly explode. The King and Du Barry pressure Mercy to get Marie to "correct her attitude". He tells the Dauphine that the treaty between Austria and France would be broken if this continues. Not wanting Europe to be engaged in war, Antoinette frustratingly relents, but her three aunts prevent this from happening at the night's next party due to their personal hatred for Du Barry. On New Years Day, Antoinette finally speaks two sentences to Du Barry, and runs from the party in tears, telling Oscar that she would never speak to her again. Oscar, admiring her dignity, swears to protect Antoinette with her life.
6	"A Silk Dress and a Rugged Dress"; Transliteration: "Kinu no doresu to borofuku" (Japanese: 絹のドレスとボロ服)	November 14, 1979
Antoinette and the Crown Prince visit Paris. Lady Oscar prevents an assassination against the Crown Prince. The culprit, Charles Colder, commits suicide by poison. His co-conspirators Duke Orleans and Duke Guemenee avoid capture. Jeanne, a poor peasant girl and a descendent of the former royal house of Valois, meets the Marquise de Brandvillier and persuades her to take her in, leaving her family behind.
7	"Who Wrote the Love Letter?"; Transliteration: "Ai no tegami wa dare no te de" (Japanese: 愛の手紙は誰の手で)	November 21, 1979
Antoinette goes to a masquerade, accompanied by Lady Oscar and both meet Hans Axel von Fersen. Antoinette and Fersen are instantly attracted to each other, and he finds out that she is the Dauphine. Fersen visits Antoinette in Versailles many times. Madame du Barry takes advantage of this by paying Lazani to make a forged love letter from Antoinette to Fersen in order to destroy her reputation. Lady Oscar finds the letter and uncovers Du Barry's plot, but Du Barry kills all witnesses and destroys all evidence, avoiding capture.
8	"Oscar in My Heart"; Transliteration: "Waga kokoro no Osukaru" (Japanese: 我が心のオスカル)	November 28, 1979
With Oscar's growing responsibility and rise in status, Andre begins to feel neglected to the point of having nightmares. Marie Antoinette sees Madame du Barry on horseback and decides to learn to ride. An accident with the horse nearly kills Antoinette and Andre, but Oscar rescues them. Andre is accused of causing the accident and arrested, but Oscar saves him by requesting a trial in the name of the Jarjayes family and claiming responsibility for the accident as Andre's master. Fersen also tries to take the blame, but Antoinette begs the King to spare them all, claiming that the accident was due to her own selfishness and saving their lives. Despite severe injuries received from the accident, Oscar survives and recovers. Fersen finds out that Oscar is a woman, and is impressed by her strength. Andre regrets ever doubting that Oscar cares for him, and vows to protect her with his life.
9	"Sun Sets, Sun Rises"; Transliteration: "Hi wa shizumi, hi wa noboru" (Japanese: 陽は沈み陽は昇る)	December 5, 1979
King Louis XV catches smallpox. Tension rises in court as everyone decides whose sides to take in case the King dies. Du Barry, fearing her loss in power if the King dies, tries to get Oscar to persuade Antoinette to forgive her. Oscar refuses, even under threats. Orleans also refuses to see her, knowing that the mistress of a dying king lacked any power that would help him take the throne. The King expels her from Versailles on his deathbed in order to receive religious absolution. Oscar stops a soldier from beating the fallen Du Barry and escorts her out of the palace for her safety. Along the way, Du Barry tells Oscar about her past, saying that as a poor orphan, she had learned to do whatever she could to survive, and that she has no regrets because she lived her life the way she wanted to live it. The narrator explains that later during the revolution, Du Barry would be executed on false charges of treason. Louis XV dies soon after, and the young and frightened Louis XVI and Marie Antoinette become King and Queen of France. Oscar leads the escort of the late king's body to his burial, crying silent tears over the destructive nature of change.
10	"A Beautiful Devil, Jeanne"; Transliteration: "Utsukushii akuma Jan'nu" (Japanese: 美しい悪魔ジャンヌ)	December 12, 1979
Louis XVI and Marie Antoinette are crowned King and Queen of France. Maximilian Robespierre, future leader of the French Revolution, reads them their congratulations. Jeanne has trained relentlessly to become a lady, but cannot enter Versailles because her guardian is not in favor at court. Having just been fired from her job due to the depression, an impoverished Rosalie begs her sister for help, but Jeanne manipulates Nicholas, a man in love with her, into attempting to kill Rosalie. Rosalie desperately attempts prostitution to get money; the first person she goes up to is Oscar, whom she mistakes for a man. Oscar gives her one gold livre for free, and wonders just how bad the conditions in France truly are. Jeanne and Nicholas kill her guardian and forge Marquise Brandvillier's will so they inherit all of her property. Oscar meets them for the first time during the funeral and suspects foul play.
11	"Fersen Departs for the Northland"; Transliteration: "Fersen kitaguni e saru" (Japanese: フェルゼン北国へ去る)	December 19, 1979
Antoinette is ecstatic to be Queen and believes that it will grant her the happiness and freedom she's been searching for. Her first act as Queen is to promote Oscar to High Commander of the Royal Guard, giving her a rank similar to that of a Colonel and doubling her salary and pension. Oscar accepts the promotion but turns down the raise due to France's current lack of wealth. Oscar worries that Antoinette's honesty with her emotions will cause her trouble as a sovereign, and that the taxation of the common people would lower her popularity. Her fears are realized when Antoinette begins canceling events and turning down the hundreds of people requesting an audience with her on a regular basis to see Fersen. She also associates with young people of no ranking rather than the families of Dukes with strong ties to the royal family, angering commoners and nobles alike. Oscar urges Fersen to go back to Sweden to avoid scandal, and he reluctantly agrees. Duke Guemenee kills a peasant boy for stealing some of his money out of starvation. Oscar angrily goes after him, but is stopped by Andre because the Duke is too powerful for even the King to touch easily.
12	"Oscar, at the Duel at Dawn...?"; Transliteration: "Kettou no asa Osukaru wa...?" (Japanese: 決闘の朝オスカルは...?)	December 26, 1979
Antoinette is easily swayed by Beltin Dressmakers into spending an extravagant amount of money on their finery. She spends more time entertaining herself than attending to her duties as Queen. Despite her earlier worries, Oscar decides to let Antoinette do what she wants because she senses that Fersen's leaving has left her very lonely. Guemenee and Orleans try to manipulate the King and Queen into canceling audiences with peasants, but Oscar advises Antoinette against this, and she listens. Oscar and Guemenee get into a fight over each other's behavior, so Guemenee challenges her to a duel. Orleans and Guemenee decide to hold the duel in a place where Oscar would be temporarily blinded by the rising sun at a crucial moment. The night before the duel, Oscar confides to Andre that though she is not afraid of Guemenee, she still does not wish to take human life. During the duel, she maneuvers around Guemenee's trick and shoots him in the hand to spare him. Upon seeing the injured Guemenee, Antoinette sentences Oscar to a month's confinement because the alternatives for opposing a powerful duke were even harsher.
13	"The Wind of Arras, Please Respond..."; Transliteration: "Arasu no kaze yo kotaete..." (Japanese: アラスの風よ応て...)	January 9, 1980
Antoinette is entranced by singer Yolande de Polignac and invites her entire family to move to Versailles—one of the many decisions that would lead to her eventual destruction. Against the rules of her confinement, Oscar takes a trip to Arras, a peasant village under her family's care. There, she learns of the terrible condition of the common French people. The peasants treat her coldly because of her noble lineage. At the inn owned by Noel, Robespierre, there on a trip to help them, tells her that the majority of French people blame the Queen's hedonism for their unending suffering. Gilbert, the son of the peasant Sugan, falls ill, and is left to die due to his family (father, mother, older sister Catherine, and younger sister)'s inability to pay for a doctor. Oscar takes him to the hospital and pays in Sugan's stead, saving the child, but is deeply affected by everything she has seen and heard.
14	"The Secret of the Angel"; Transliteration: "Tenshi no himitsu" (Japanese: 天使の秘密)	January 16, 1980
Oscar and Andre return to their manor. Polignac manipulates Antoinette into giving her family undeserved wealth and ranking, causing resentment among the nobles. Oscar tells her father about everything she had seen in Arras, but is rebuked for her rule-breaking and is told to ignore the peasants. Rosalie finds a job at Beltin Dressmakers---right before her mother is run over by Polignac's carriage. Before she dies, her mother tells her that she is not her real child, and that her real mother was someone called "Martine Gabrielle". Rosalie is comforted by Bernard Chatelet, a news reporter who promises to help her whenever she needs it. Swearing to avenge her mother's death, she heads towards Versailles, and mistakes Madame Jarjayes for Polignac. Oscar foils her attempt to stab the Madame. After hearing her story, Oscar takes her in as her protege so she could enter court and avenge her mother.
15	"Countess of Casino"; Transliteration: "Kajino no hakushaku fujin" (Japanese: カジノの伯爵夫人)	January 23, 1980
Oscar is released from confinement and put back on duty. Orleans and Guemenee place pressure on Antoinette for her lack of an heir, using her rising insecurity and tarnishing reputation to their advantage. Polignac scares Antoinette into lying that she is pregnant. She feels horribly guilty, but Polignac persuades her from turning back. Polignac and her friends begin gambling illegally with Antoinette under the guise of cheering her up; in reality, the games are fixed so they could cover their own gambling losses. Antoinette from then on becomes addicted to gambling. Oscar confronts Polignac, but is unable to report her because the Queen's reputation would be further tarnished if the public knew of her activities. Antoinette becomes 500,000 livres (55 million U.S. dollars) in debt, but Polignac's crocodile tears help her avoid punishment. In a desperate attempt to stop the Queen's squandering, Oscar requests on her life that Antoinette quit gambling. She does, but Polignac sends out an announcement that the Queen had a miscarriage because Oscar drew a sword in front of her.
16	"Mother, Her Name is...?" Transliteration: "Haha, sono hito no na wa...?" (Japanese: 母, その人の名は...?)	January 30, 1980
Rosalie struggles through etiquette and fencing lessons and attends her first ball as Oscar's distant relative. Jeanne and Nicholas pose as Count and Countess de la Motte to con money from the ball's hostess. Rosalie's quick popularity attracts Charlotte's scorn, who humiliates her to tears and causes her to run from the ballroom. As she leaves, Rosalie sees Jeanne, who is shaken by the knowledge of her mother's death and the fact that Rosalie is being cared for by a family richer than her. Oscar confronts Polignac over her daughter Charlotte's behavior, and she begins to view the Head Commander as a threat.
17	"Now the Time of Encounter"; Transliteration: "Ima meguriai no toki" (Japanese: 今めぐり逢いの時)	February 6, 1980
Oscar and Rosalie go to court to introduce Rosalie to the Queen. Rosalie finally encounters Polignac and the two of them recognize each other at once. Oscar stops Rosalie from killing Polignac with a hidden knife due to the large number of witnesses, and uses threats to prevent Polignac from revealing Rosalie's poor background. Afterwards, Oscar, Andre, and Rosalie begin searching for Rosalie's birth mother. Polignac rigs a chandelier to fall on Oscar, but Andre saves her life. She then tries to have Oscar killed in the middle of the night by assassins. Oscar is injured while trying to protect Rosalie, but Fersen arrives just before the finishing blow.
18	"Suddenly, Like Icarus"; Transliteration: "Totsuzen Ikarusu no you ni" (Japanese: 突然イカルスのように)	February 13, 1980
Fersen's sudden arrival causes the assassins to retreat. Oscar is taken back to her manor to recover, and correctly suspects Polignac as the mastermind of the plot. Charlotte is horrified at her mother's attempt at murder due to her admiration for Oscar. Fersen tells Oscar that he came to France for business---and due to his father's desire to find him a wife. Fersen has a prospective candidate in mind, but has never met her before, and he desperately asks Oscar if people should only marry for love. Antoinette is ecstatic at Fersen's return, but breaks down in tears when he tells her of his marriage plans. Oscar angrily asks Fersen why he told her this, and he says that he is wrongly in love with the Queen, and wants to break away from his feelings in order to do the right thing. Oscar spends the next few hours in emotional pain, and goes to an opera alone because Fersen is too saddened to attend. Antoinette, late for the concert, accidentally meets Fersen in the woods, and one thing leads to another.
19	"Farewell, My Sister!"; Transliteration: "Sayonara, imōto yo!" (Japanese: さよなら, 妹よ!)	February 20, 1980
Polignac agrees to marry off 11-year-old Charlotte to Duke Guiche, a powerful but shady middle-aged man with an unhealthy fetish for young girls. Charlotte is so terrified of her suitor that she faints upon meeting him. She begs Polignac not to force into the marriage, but to no avail. Rosalie trains and improves drastically in order to avenge her mother, but Oscar wonders what Rosalie would do after this is accomplished. Andre finds out that "Martine Gabrielle" was the former first name of Polignac; in other words, Rosalie's birth mother was the murderer of her foster mother. Rosalie accidentally overhears Andre telling Oscar this, and claims that she feels no love for Polignac in spite of their relation. Oscar tells Rosalie that she had lied when she offered to help with her revenge, hoping instead that time would've caused her to abandon her revenge plans. Rosalie follows Polignac to a party hosted by Guiche and attacks her carriage, but is unable to bring herself to shoot her. At a ball later, Guiche forcefully kisses Charlotte's hand, causing her to go insane and commit suicide by jumping off of a tower. Rosalie claims that she does not mind that Charlotte died, but begins crying, realizing that she truly cared for her sister.
20	"Fersen, a Farewell Rondeau"; Transliteration: "Fersen nagori no rinbu" (Japanese: フェルゼン名残りの輪舞)	February 27, 1980
Fersen continues spending nights with the Queen, but the guilt is eating away at him. He begins spending his time at run-down, shady bars while rumors of their liaison spread throughout France. Andre notices that Oscar cannot stop thinking about Fersen and fervently wants him to forget about the Count. Antoinette begs Oscar to tell Fersen that she needs to cancel one of their secret meetings because a friend of the King was coming and Oscar is the only one she could trust. Oscar tearfully tries practicing asking the Queen to stop her affair, but knows that she will not succeed due to their intense love for one another. She delivers Antoinette's message and rides away before Fersen could say too much. Drawings of the nude Queen seducing Fersen sell in great numbers on the street, while the Revolutionary War rages in America and France sends voluntary troops to help them fight. Oscar wears a formal uniform to the night's ball and dances with Antoinette so she would not dance with Fersen. Fersen thanks Oscar for this afterwards, and then vows to leave France for good so he would not cause the Queen any more disgrace. He heads to America to fight in the Revolutionary War. Oscar refuses to see him off, but cries as she secretly begs him not to die.
21	"The Black Rose Blooms at Night"; Transliteration: "Kurobara wa yoru hiraku" (Japanese: 黒ばらは夜ひらく)	March 5, 1980
Sleazy Cardinal Rohan tries to seek the Queen's favor but is hated by her to the point where she will not even talk to him. This is because he was a former Austrian ambassador who was fired by Empress Maria Theresa for his habit of fooling around with prostitutes. Rohan asks Jeanne for help. Oscar is visibly depressed by Fersen's leave, so she retreats with Andre and Rosalie to a beach-side manor. Jeanne visits Oscar and tries to bribe her with gold, but she coldly refuses them, not trusting her. Jeanne lies to Rohan and says that she had accepted the bribe, and that their plan to use Oscar to get to the Queen had worked. She also pretends to be in love with him, and asks for 10,000 livres so she could meet with the Queen and introduce him to her, but she keeps the gold bribe and 10,000 livres for herself. She then lies to Rohan and tells him that she has met the Queen, forges a reply to a letter he wrote her, and asks for 50,000 more livres under the guise of donating it to the Queen. In spite of her wealth, Jeanne is somehow unhappy and begins to drink at night. Rohan, still under the false impression that the Queen likes him, crashes the Queen's ball, and becomes suspicious when the Queen pretends to fall ill as soon as she sees him. Jeanne dissuades his suspicions by persuading him that the Queen wants to see him alone, but she actually hires a blind prostitute to pose as the Queen and make him think that the Queen loved him. Oscar arrives just after Jeanne, Rohan, Nicholas, and the prostitute finish their meeting in the garden.
22	"The Necklace Shines Ominously"; Transliteration: "Kubikazari wa fukitsuna kagayaki" (Japanese: 首飾りは不吉な輝き)	March 12, 1980
Two years after Fersen leaves, the Queen has given birth to daughter Marie Therese and son Joseph. She moves to Petit Trianon, a small villa on the property of Versailles, to spend more time with her children---and thus, ignores her Queenly duties and ends all audiences for good while the troubles of the peasants grow with each passing day and the nobles are frustrated due to their inability to talk to the Queen. Oscar, knowing the harm that Antoinette is causing, chooses to ignore it because the Queen has not been so happy in years. Empress Maria Theresa dies worrying about her daughter. Boehmer, a jeweler with a 1,600,000 livre diamond necklace (200 million US dollars) was unable to sell it to the Queen four years ago and now asks Jeanne for help. She convinces Rohan that Antoinette wants the necklace and had asked Rohan to be the guarantor. Instead of delivering the necklace to the Queen, Jeanne separates each of the diamonds and asks Nicholas to sell them in England. The Revolutionary War ends, and French soldiers begin returning home. Oscar goes to Trianon to ask the Queen to restart the audiences, but is unable to once she sees how joyful Antoinette is with her children. (In the manga, she tries to persuade Antoinette nevertheless, but her advice is rejected.) Worrying about whether or not Fersen had survived the war, Oscar and Andre go to drink at a pub where they meet Robespierre, who had become a lawyer "for the People", and Bernard, who had become his follower. Oscar and Andre are beaten up by the pub's customers once they find out that Oscar is a noble. The jeweler sends a letter to the Queen, asking for his payment, but she is unaware of Jeanne's scheme and burns it, beginning the Affair of the Diamond Necklace.
23	"Cunning and Tough!"; Transliteration: "Zurugashikokute takumashiku!" (Japanese: ずる賢くてたくましく!)	March 19, 1980
When the almost-bankrupt jeweler does not receive his payment, he continually begs to meet the Queen until the King summons her to Versailles. Rohan is arrested and questioned, revealing that Jeanne was the culprit behind the fraud. He presents the love letters and sales contract as proof of the Queen's buying of the necklace and her love for him, but the King reveals that the signatures are wrong. The King asks the Queen to forgive Rohan because he correctly believes him to be set up by Jeanne, but the Queen does not, believing that he had deliberately plotted with the Mottes in order to take revenge for her and her mother ignoring him. Jeanne decides to kill Nicole the prostitute in order to silence the witness, but falters at the last moment and instead gives her 100 livres to escape---right before they are arrested. Robespierre uses the Necklace Affair as propaganda against Versailles. Rosalie begs Oscar to give Jeanne their mother's old ring in prison as a keepsake. Jeanne refuses the ring, claiming she did not know a Rosalie and would never wear such "cheap trinkets". Oscar leaves it on her cell floor---and Jeanne wears it at the trial, praying to her mother to help her win. Nicole proves Jeanne's guilt at the trial, but Jeanne says that the Queen had ordered her to help get the necklace, and that she, Polignac, and Oscar were among the Queen's many lesbian lovers. Nicole and Rohan are found innocent. The forger is given 35 years of exile. Jeanne and Nicholas are given life sentences, but the trial forever taints the royal family and angers the many people who believe Jeanne's lies. Jeanne gains sympathy from the entire country, and commoners and nobles line up each day to see her in prison.
24	"Adieu, My Youth"; Transliteration: "Adyū, watashi no seishun" (Japanese: アデュウ, わたしの青春)	March 26, 1980
Jeanne is broken out of prison by a masked man who enlists her help. She publishes a book series listing all of the Queen's supposed crimes while hiding in Severne Monastery with Nicolas, intensifying the rumors that Versailles is falling apart. The Cabinet sends out the Royal Guard to capture Jeanne and enforce the ban against the books. Jeanne makes a lot of money on the books but cannot set foot outside of the monastery. Not trusting the masked man's promise to send them overseas, she becomes depressed, and her alcohol drinking intensifies. Polignac blackmails Rosalie into joining her household, saying that she would spread information implicating Oscar in the Necklace Affair if she does not. After Jeanne's series is finished, the masked man lets the Cabinet know her location in order to silence her. Oscar's regiment is sent to Severene for the arrest, and she enters the building alone. Nicholas wants to use her as hostage, but a drunken Jeanne refuses to escape. He then tries to strangle Oscar, but Jeanne stabs him and explodes the monastery, killing the both of them. Andre senses Oscar's danger and saves her life. The masked man's identity is never known, though Orleans is suspected.
25	"A Minuet of Unrequited Love"; Transliteration: "Katakoi no menuetto" (Japanese: かた恋のメヌエット)	April 2, 1980
Oscar is promoted to Brigadier, but revolution is ablaze in France's streets. The royal family is hated, commoners are assaulting nobles and vandalizing mansions, and some nobles have even joined the civilians against Louis and Antoinette. Fersen returns to France after a seven-year absence, much to Oscar's delight and Andre's carefully hidden jealousy. He tries to keep his return a secret and resolves not to see the Queen, but heads to Trianon to support her once he realizes the graveness of her situation because he still loves her. He pledges his life to her, but promises not to rekindle their romance in order to avoid any more trouble. He advises her to return to Versailles and break ties with Polignac's clique, and she listens. With her hopes that Fersen is no longer in love unrecognized, Oscar is distracted by thoughts of him during duty and feels ashamed. She dresses up as a woman for the first time and attends a ball as a magnificent, unnamed foreigner. Fersen dances with her. Not knowing her true identity, he highly praises Oscar and calls her "my most precious and beautiful friend". Oscar runs from the ball and cries happily outside, feeling that she would now be able to fully give up life as a woman after experiencing one moment of romance.
26	"I Want to See the Black Knight!"; Transliteration: "Kuroikishi ni aitai!" (Japanese: 黒い騎士に会いたい!)	April 9, 1980
A masked vigilante called the Black Knight begins stealing from the rich and giving to the poor. His popularity increases to the point where marches are being held for him in the streets. Andre begins spending an abnormal amount of time outside during the evenings, causing Oscar to suspect him of being the Knight. She starts attending every ball available, because that is where the Knight usually strikes. He does so one ball after Andre mysteriously disappears. Oscar chases him into Palais Royale, Orleans' manor, rumored to be an anti-monarchist meeting place. Oscar is injured by the guards, but the Knight stops them from killing her. She escapes, collapses on the street, and has a nightmare where Andre is the Black Knight and is killed during a mission. Oscar is rescued by a peasant family housing Rosalie. She tells her that she left the Polignacs when they tried to force her to marry Guiche in order to expand their prestige. Oscar asks if she would return to her manor, and she politely declines, saying that she would rather live in the city of her birth away from nobles as she has grown to hate them, except for Oscar since she has been so kind to her. Back at Versailles, Oscar confronts Andre, but he says that he is not the Knight and reveals that he has been going to a church where nobles and peasants gather regularly to hear about "The New Age". Andre dresses up as a fake Knight and begins stealing regularly in order to lure out the real one. One night, the real Knight confronts Andre and slashes his left eye.
27	"Even if I Lose the Light..."; Transliteration: "Tatoe hikari o ushinau to mo..." (Japanese: たとえ光を失うとも...)	April 16, 1980
The Knight escapes while Oscar tends to Andre. The doctor tells him to keep bandages over his eye until it is healed to avoid blindness. Oscar decides to investigate Royale after the Knight steals 200 new rifles. She questions Orleans, but learns nothing, and is instead taken to his salon where young intellectuals and "Liberalists" from all classes gather regularly to talk. Oscar investigates the Liberalists under the guise of light conversation, but the Knight is watching from a distance and decides to take Oscar hostage in order to blackmail firearms from General Jarjayes, her father and the one in charge of all the Royal Guard's military weapons. After being held in a cell for two days, the Knight asks Oscar to write the ransom letter, falsely thinking that the "weak pride of nobles" will lead her to do so. When Oscar does not return, Andre takes off his bandages, dons his Knight costume, rides to Royale, and steals Oscar's cell keys. She captures, severely wounds, and unmasks the Knight, who turns out to be Bernard, but Andre's left eye becomes permanently blind. In anger, Oscar almost blinds Bernard's eye in retaliation, but Andre persuades her to let Bernard go unharmed because he is able to help the common people. Bernard tells her that he and his men are only using of Orleans' Liberalist position to use his manor as a hideout, and they have no loyalty to him. Oscar gets Bernard to pay 1000 livres for the stolen guns and takes Bernard to hide and heal in Rosalie's house.
28	"Andre, a Blue Lemon"; Transliteration: "Andore, aoi remon" (Japanese: アンドレ, 青いレモン)	April 30, 1980
Andre begins to experience blurring vision in his right eye due to the stress he must put on it ever since his left eye became blind. Fersen visits Oscar and unmasks her as the unnamed woman he danced with, exposing her secret crush for him. He implicitly pursues her – but is ultimately rejected by Oscar. Oscar bids him farewell and vows never to see him again, for she cannot forgive herself for being troubled by love and has decided to live as an independent man. Andre temporarily experiences a moment of blindness. He rides out into Paris and joins in the merrymaking of the French Guards for an entire night to take his mind off of the knowledge that he will eventually go blind. Oscar quits the Royal Guards because she wants to do riskier jobs in order to ensure that she will always live life as a man. She dismisses Andre, telling him she wants to live on her own. Desperate about parting from her, Andre speaks up, "A rose cannot become a lilac." Oscar asks what he means, then loses control and slaps him hard. She grabs his collar and provokes him both emotionally and physically. In his despair over going blind, Andre kisses her by force, and her shirt is torn in the struggle. He quickly regains his senses, feels deep regret, and apologizes. As he leaves the room, he confesses his love in a flat voice, saying that no matter what she does, she will always be a woman to him.
29	"A Marionette Starting to Walk"; Transliteration: "Aruki hajimeta ningyō" (Japanese: 歩き始めた人形)	May 14, 1980
Oscar is appointed as the Commander of the French Guards Company B, a particularly rough regiment filled mostly with commoners. She tells Andre that she does not hold the other night's incident against him. She decides to avoid facing him as much as possible, since she cannot return his love at that moment. A desperately drunk Andre is comforted by the bard, who tells him that love is heart to heart and beyond eyesight. Inspired, he joins Company B so he can see and protect Oscar – much to her chagrin. Company B decides to boycott Oscar's inaugural troops review because they do not want to be commanded by an aristocratic woman. She responds by challenging one of their troops to a duel, saying that she would leave the French Guards if they lost, but that they would have to do the review if she won. She wins, and the review takes place, but Alain de Soissons, the group's squad leader, tells her that winning one fight will not gain her full acceptance, and that the majority of soldiers in Company B are only in it for the salary. Girodelle, Oscar's former subordinate and successor in the French Guards briefly visits her, but he acts unusually and leaves quickly. When Oscar questions her former Nanny, she tells her that Girodelle had asked her father for permission to marry Oscar---and her father had agreed.
30	"You are the Light, I am the Shadow"; Transliteration: "Omae wa hikari, ore wa kage" (Japanese: お前は光俺は影)	May 21, 1980
General Jarjayes decides to marry Oscar off to Girodelle and have her quit the military. Louis Saint-Just, one of Robespierre's more unstable allies, begins killing nobles unnecessarily against Robespierre's wishes. Alain informs Andre that it is now widely known that he was once Oscar's servant, and tells him to watch his back. The Company B soldiers deliberately disobey Oscar's orders to investigate the Opera House, but she insists to her father that the disobedience is exciting. She asks him to refuse Girodelle's proposal, and Jarjayes begins to cry, feeling that he had caused her unnecessary hardship by raising her as a man. Oscar tells him that she is grateful for her life because it taught her to be strong. Nanny tells a horrified Andre about Girodelle's proposal. He is then beaten up by fellow soldiers, but Alain threatens them so they promise not to do so again. Alain learns the reason for Andre's enlistment when he begins talking about Girodelle's proposal in his unconsciousness. General Jarjayes insists that Oscar attend a grand party as a woman with all of her (many) suitors as guests, but he is shot by Saint-Just the following day. Oscar vows to avenge her father's injury, but he tells her that her marriage would make him happier. She tells Andre that she "won't get married so easily" and makes only a brief appearance at her ball in soldier attire. Jarjayes decides to stop pressuring her, but hopes that she will never stop searching for happiness.
31	"A Lilac Blooming in the Barracks"; Transliteration: "Heiei ni saku rira no hana" (Japanese: 兵営に咲くリラの花)	June 4, 1980
Rising crime rates make Oscar's job busier than ever. The Ardelos family (Carlos, his wife and daughter) comes from Spain for a goodwill envoy to the French Royal Family and is in danger of terrorist attacks. Company B is assigned to protect them because the Royal Guard is busy and Oscar is the only French Guard Commander who knows noble etiquette. Saint-Just targets the Ardelos' and plants a traitor in Company B to kill Oscar before they begin their attack. Oscar defeats the traitor, but Andre and Alain shoot him before she can question him. Saint-Just's men set fire to the building the Ardelos' are residing in, but Oscar chases him off just before he can kill the family. Saint-Just's men get away via use of an explosion which knocks out Oscar, Andre, and Alain. The Ardelos' make it safely back to Spain. Oscar finds out that one of her men had to pawn his government-issued rifle in order to make ends meet, an illegal act. He is arrested and sentenced to death. Alain is outraged that Oscar has allowed this to happen and challenges her to a sword duel.
32	"The Prelude to the Storm"; Transliteration: "Arashi no pureryūdo" (Japanese: 嵐のプレリュード)	June 18, 1980
Alain proves to be the most talented swordfighter Oscar has ever met and will ever meet. He disarms her, but not before she cuts him, winning the duel. She later persuades General Bouille, a higher-up, to pardon the man who pawned his rifle, earning her the permanent respect of Alain and Company B. Oscar and Andre go to Paris to thank Bouille, but are attacked by peasants due to Oscar's noble status. Fersen, now an Army Colonel, is sent to suppress the riot. He pulls Oscar from the mob, but cannot find Andre. In a moment of desperation, she begs Fersen to save "my Andre", shocking herself with her choice of words. Fersen distracts the mob from Andre, saving his life. Oscar realizes that though she still cares for Fersen, she does not love him anymore. Alain does not come back from his leave, so Oscar and Andre go to his home to deliver his pay---and find the rotting body of his sister on his bed. She had been engaged to a poor noble who abandoned her in favor of a rich lady, causing her to commit suicide. The once-spirited Alain is traumatized and refuses to go back to the French Guard. Meanwhile, the people begin demanding for the Etats-Generaux.
33	"A Funeral Bell Tolls in the Twilight"; Transliteration: "Tasogare ni chōsō wa naru" (Japanese: たそがれに弔鐘は鳴る)	July 2, 1980
After holding a rally, Bernard reveals to Andre that he and Rosalie are happily married and working for Robespierre. The dissatisfaction and poverty of the common people reaches its peak. Under public pressure, the king convenes the Etats-Generaux for the first time in several centuries. The gravely ill, seven-year-old Crown Prince Joseph goes with Oscar on a horse ride despite his frail condition due to his great admiration for her. He vows with all his heart to someday become a great king for the people of France. Alain goes back to Company B to see the Etats-Generaux. Fersen returns to Sweden. At the Etats-Generaux's opening ceremony, no one claps for Marie Antoinette. A month of difficult debate between the commoner delegates and nobles pass. Oscar begins to suspect something wrong with Andre's right eye. Sadly, on a rainy night, Joseph dies, dreaming of returning home to Versailles with Oscar.
34	"Now "The Tennis Court Oath""; Transliteration: "Ima 'Tenisu kōto no chikai'" (Japanese: 今"テニスコートの誓い")	July 9, 1980
The conflict between the commoners and nobles intensify. Oscar coughs up blood during patrol. The delegates cooperate with some nobles and clergy to form the National Assembly. The King denies the delegates entry to the assembly hall due to their rising number of victories. Oscar is ordered against her will to seal the doors, and the delegates move to a tennis court where the Tennis Court Oath is made, marking the start of the French Revolution. The King reopens the doors to resolve the situation, but the delegates are allowed only through the back doors, which they refuse to go through. Oscar opens the front doors against colonel Choiseul La Baume's orders, allowing the delegates into the hall. The King is badly advised into trying to dissolve the National Assembly. Company B is ordered to forcibly remove all delegates from the hall, but Oscar refuses and is arrested. Twelve soldiers including Alain who refuse to take orders from a new commander are arrested and held at Abbey, presumably until they're shot for treason. Oscar escapes with the help of Andre once she learns that the Royal Guards would be sent to remove the delegates, and they rush to stop them.
35	"Oscar, Now is the Time to Flee the Nest"; Transliteration: "Osukaru, ima, subanare no toki" (Japanese: オスカル, いま, 巣離れの時)	July 23, 1980
Oscar and Andre stop the Royal Guards, led by Girodelle, from firing on the National Assembly. General Jarjayes decides to execute Oscar with his own hands and commit suicide afterwards, but she refuses to die and Andre intervenes. Right before he is about to kill the both of them, he is interrupted by a pardon from the Queen. The twelve soldiers are sentenced to death without even being called to their trial, but Oscar gets Bernard to mobilize 5000 people in a rally for them, promising a lifetime of servitude if the rally turns into a riot and people are injured or killed. She orders Company B to guard the rally, ordering them not to shoot anyone no matter what happens. Saint-Just tries to turn the rally into a riot by killing Oscar because the people would be forbidden to rally without her authority, but the assassination fails. Oscar and the Queen use their authority to persuade the King that the rally is a threat to national security, resulting in the soldiers' release.
36	"The Watchword is "Au Revoir""; Transliteration: "Ai kotoba wa 'sayonara'" (Japanese: 合言葉は"サヨナラ")	July 30, 1980
Robespierre persuades Finance Minister Jacques Necker to talk the King into approving the Assembly, knowing that this is the only way to avoid bloodshed. Antoinette still believes in the Royal Family's invincibility and that the National Assembly will be dissolved. She orders 100,000 soldiers from every part of France to suppress the revolutionaries, and tells Oscar that she might have to join them soon. Oscar's illness progresses, and she realizes that there is a problem with her lungs. She begins to model for a portrait of herself though she had always declined being painted before. The soldiers prevent all rallies and gatherings and skirmish with the commoners on a regular basis. Due to the large number of soldiers, Paris plunges into a severe food shortage. Orleans begins demanding for Louis XVI's abdication—and his own coronation, but is ignored due to lack of support. Necker tries to persuade the King to approve the Assembly while Antoinette tries otherwise. Andre suspects Oscar's secret illness. Robespierre denies Saint-Just's request to assassinate the Royal Family and sends Bernard to keep him in line. Saint-Just shakes Bernard's faith in Robespierre's motives. Antoinette banishes Necker from Versailles, and Robespierre uses this as propaganda for the people to take up arms against the Royal Family, spreading lies that a massacre is about to occur. Though Saint-Just's words now seem true, Bernard decides to not care about Robespierre as long as the people can be represented. Oscar begs Antoinette to withdraw the army from Paris, but she refuses. Antoinette, in turn, asks if she would still protect her if revolution came, and Oscar responds by saying that she is no longer in the Royal Guards. Oscar leaves Antoinette in silent tears, knowing that they would never see each other again.
37	"On the Night of Passionate Vows"; Transliteration: "Atsuki chikai no yoru ni" (Japanese: 熱き誓いの夜に)	August 6, 1980
Oscar discovers that she has tuberculosis. Since the only known cure for it is rest and a good environment, her doctor tells her to quit the military and move to a country mansion—or else she would die in half-a-year. She also finds out that Andre is going blind. Company A is dispatched to fight armed citizens, and Company B is told to stand by. Civilians begin raiding food and firearms. Oscar's portrait is finished. It portrays her as Mars, the Roman God of War, and is hailed as a masterpiece, but Andre can not see it. He describes Oscar's beauty in the painting with his imagination, moving Oscar to tears because he describes things that are not there. Company B is ordered to suppress a riot, and the two of them prepare to leave for the guard barracks. General Jarjayes is also dispatched. Before he leaves, he tells Andre that he would've allowed him to marry Oscar had he been a noble, and begs him not to die. On the way, Oscar and Andre are attacked by rioters, but they escape. That night, Oscar tells Andre that she knows how he is almost blind. She tries to send him back to the mansion, but he says that he will always be with her. She finally confesses her love to him and they consummate their union.
38	"In Front of the Door of Destiny"; Transliteration: "Unmei no tobira no mae de" (Japanese: 運命の扉の前で)	August 20, 1980
Company B is summoned to subdue the protest at the Tuileries Square in Paris, but they decide to fight with the civilians under Oscar's command if a riot breaks out. A child is killed by a soldier of the German Cavalry Regiment, causing violence to erupt throughout the city. The people are armed well, but disorganized, causing them to retreat against the army during the first battle of the French Revolutionary War. The former Company B forces the German Cavalry to retreat without gunshots, but are still distrusted by the revolting civilians. Oscar walks into their crowd weaponless, saying that she would not mind begin shot if her men could be trusted. With the help of Bernard, she gains their trust. When the Allemande Regiment attacks, Company B goes on the offensive, allowing the civilians time to build a barricade around the square. Andre becomes completely blind during this crucial moment. After this battle, Company B is ambushed by another regiment. They lose half their members in the fighting. While trying to return to Tuileries, Andre is shot directly in the heart.
39	"His Smile is Forever Gone!"; Transliteration: "Ano hohoemi wa mō kaeranai!" (Japanese: あの微笑はもう還らない!)	August 27, 1980
Oscar's men rush to take Andre to a doctor, relentlessly charging through rows of firing enemy soldiers. At Tuileries, more than 10 doctors tend to his wound. Andre expresses a strong will to live, saying that he can not pass away with so many beginnings surrounding them, but dies nevertheless, smiling and crying tears. Believing that she would not be able to take charge in her despair, Oscar asks Alain to lead the group in her stead, but he persuades her to continue doing so. She wanders through the night consumed by grief, regret, and nostalgia, before collapsing from her illness in the rain. Alain finds her in the morning, and they join the civilian army headed to storm the infamous Bastille Prison. Despite the small number of people in Bastille, its cannons and walls send tens of thousand of people to their death. The civilian army is unable to fire their own cannons because none of them know how to, but Oscar takes command of the cannons and causes severe damage to the walls before being shot down by the riflemen within.
40	"Adieu, My Beloved Oscar"; Transliteration: "Sayōnara waga itoshi no Osukaru" (Japanese: さようならわが愛しのオスカル)	September 3, 1980
Mortally wounded, Oscar's last request is that the former French Guards continue firing and seize Bastille Prison. She dies on July 14, 1789, listening to the sounds of the Storming of Bastille. It surrenders an hour afterwards. Five years later, Rosalie and Bernard visit Alain at his farm, filling him in about the fate of the King, Marie Antoinette, Hans Axel von Fersen and other figures of the Revolution. Polignac and many other nobles had fled the Queen's side, but Fersen returned to Paris to help the Royal Family escape. His plan failed, and Louis XVI, Marie Antoinette, and their children were arrested and executed, though the Queen's mind was comforted whenever she thought of Oscar. Robespierre and Saint-Just were also executed in political struggles. Fersen became cold-hearted after Marie's death, and was slaughtered by his own citizens. Bernard begins writing a book about the French Revolution, and Oscar and Andre were buried together on a small hill in Arras. The morning of her execution, Antoinette gave Rosalie a paper flower and told her to color it in Oscar's favorite color. The group ultimately decides to keep the rose white, symbolizing Oscar's enduring nobility.
OVA	"The Rose and Women of Versailles"; Transliteration: "Berusaiyu no bara to on'na-tachi" (Japanese: ベルサイユのばらと女たち)	September 10, 1980 (VHS)
A summary episode of the whole series showing memorable scenes.

=== "Phantom Episode" ===
In some regions of Japan, the broadcast was cut short at the 24th episode. A completely different final episode created for closure, "Portrait of a Burning Rose," was broadcast instead of the original 24th episode, "Adieu, My Youth." While some sources refer to it as a compilation episode, the majority of the content, excluding a few flashback scenes, is purported to consist of newly drawn animation.

"Portrait of a Burning Rose" has never been re-broadcast since then, and it has never been released on DVDs or any other video format. Therefore, little is known about the episode, except for the testimony of the few who had purportedly seen it.

No.	Title	Original release date
24	"Portrait of a Burning Rose"; Transliteration: "Moetsukita Bara no Shōzō" (Japanese: 燃えつきたバラの肖像)	March 26, 1980
Allegedly, the story covers events from right after the 23rd episode up to episode 35 of the anime series, "Oscar, Now is the Time to Flee the Nest". The plot mainly focuses on Oscar and André, without Fersen or Alain making an appearance. Antoinette is only shown at the very beginning. Oscar faces off against her father, General Jarjeyes because she refuses to obey an order to expel commoners. André steps in to help, and their interaction leads to Oscar and André pledging their love to each other, the climax of the episode.
