= Korean History (book series) =

South Korean book series

- Author: National Institute of Korean History
- Country: South Korea
- Language: Korean
- Discipline: History of Korea
- Published: 1973–1979; 1993–2003 (New Edition)
- No. of books: 25; 53 (New Edition)
- Website: contents.history.go.kr/front/nh/main.do (New Edition, in Korean)

Korean History (Korean: 『한국사』; Hanja: 『韓國史』) is a series of history books about the history of Korea published by the National Institute of Korean History (NIKH). The series was published as 25 volumes from 1973 to 1979.

Korean History: New Edition (Korean: 『신편 한국사』; Hanja: 『新編韓國史』) is a revised version of the series also by the NIKH. It was published in 53 volumes from 1993 to 2003.

== Description ==
=== Korean History ===
Korean History began to be compiled in late 1969. Initially, the historians planned to published 30 books from 1971 to 1976, but they adjusted their plans. They decided to divide Korean history into four main eras: the ancient period, Goryeo, Joseon, and the modern period. The table of contents for the series was prepared from July 1970 to February 1971.

Much of the series is grouped by topics; each topic is connected to each other but is able to stand on its own. Each topic was assigned to experts in that area; around 200 scholars ended up contributing to the creation of the series.

The volumes were published out of order. Volumes 1, 7, 9, 17, and 18 were published in 1973. This was followed by vols. 5, 6, 14, 15, and 16 in 1974; vols. 4, 8, 10, 11, and 20 in 1975; vols. 3, 13, 19, 21, and 22 in 1976; vols. 2, 12, and 23 in 1977; and vols. 24 and 25 in 1978. Vols. 1 to 3 were for the ancient period, 4 to 8 for Goryeo, 9 to 15 for Joseon, and 16 to 22 for the modern period. Vol. 23 served as a general commentary, 24 as an index, and 25 as an appendix.

=== Korean History: New Edition ===
The creation of Korean History: New Edition was motivated by the desire to include new research about Korea in the text, as well as to address perceived shortcomings in the previous version. It was published in 52 volumes, and covers ancient Korea until the 1948 establishment of South Korea. It cost a total of ₩1.43 billion to produce, and involved the work of 16 advisory council members, 28 editors, and 730 historian contributors. A conference was held in celebration of its completion on December 11, 2003, and included descriptions of how the text was compiled and analyses on it.

This version makes an explicit effort to include descriptions of Korean culture during each time period, and to incorporate the history of Balhae as part of Korean history. Vol. 1 is a general commentary text, vols. 2 to 11 covers prehistory to the Three Kingdoms period, vols. 12 to 21 Goryeo, vols. 22 to 36 Joseon, vols. 37 to 46 the modern period, and vols. 47 to 52 the Japanese colonial period and the establishment of South Korea. Volume 53 is an index.
