= Fujin Kōron =

Japanese women's magazine

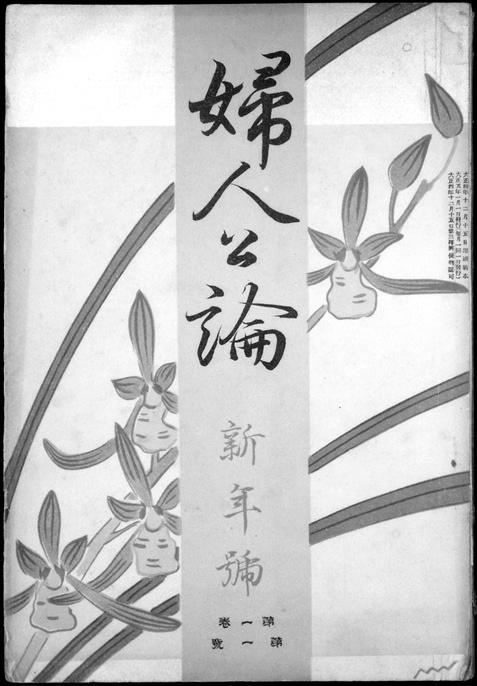
- The first issue of Fujinkōron
- Editor: Keiko Yokoyama (横山恵子)
- Categories: Women's magazine
- Frequency: Biweekly
- Publisher: Chuokoron-Shinsha (中央公論新社)
- Founded: 1916
- First issue: January 1916
- Country: Japan
- Based in: Tokyo
- Language: Japanese
- Website: http://www.fujinkoron.jp/

Fujin Kōron (婦人公論) lit. 'Woman's Review' is a Japanese bi-weekly women's magazine published by Chūōkōron-Shinsha. It was founded under the concept of women's liberation and establishment of selfhood. It was first published in January 1916 (Taishō 5). It was one of the new intellectual feminist magazines in Japan during the 1910s.

In 2016, the magazine celebrated its 100th anniversary. It reached its 1600th issue in 2023 and launched a digital subscription service, the "Fujin Kōron ff Club," the same year.

== History ==
Fujin Kōron was first published in January 1916 with goal of providing a women's version of the literary magazine Chūō Kōron. The inaugural cover featured the work of Kotaro Nagahara, a painter and member of the Hakuba-kai. Early issues of the magazine featured debate over the Japanese government's obligation towards pregnant women by feminists Yosano Akiko and Hiratsuka Raichō.

The January 1931 issue of Fujin Kōron featured the work of Seiji Tōgō and introduced an early version of the magazine's current logo, also by Tōgō.

The magazine was suspended during World War II and continued publication six months after the war's end. In 1947, Fujin Kōron published Junichirō Tanizaki's The Makioka Sisters.

The August 1965 issue began the magazine's practice of utilizing photographs on its cover. In this instance, the cover featured a photo of Sayuri Yoshinaga taken by Ken Domon.

In 1998, the magazine underwent a major redesign, adopting a larger format and increasing publication from once a month to twice a month. The March 1998 issue introduced the new design and featured a photo of Seiko Matsuda taken by Kishin Shinoyama.

The January 2016 issue marked the magazine's 100th anniversary and sold enough copies as to trigger a reprint. The cover featured a photo of Rie Miyazawa taken by Kishin Shinoyama.

In 2022, the magazine underwent another major redesign, this time adopting an even larger format and font size for easier reading. It also returned to publishing once a month.

== Notable works ==
Year	Author	Title
1923	Ryūnosuke Akutagawa	Saru kani gassen (猿蟹合戦, The Crab and the Monkey)
1932	Fusako Kushi	Memoirs of a Declining Ryukyuan Woman (Horobiyuku ryukyu-onna no shuki,滅びゆく琉球女の手記)
1936	Ineko Sata (as Ineko Kubokawa)	Crimson (Kurenai, くれなゐ)
1942	Osamu Dazai	December 8th (Jūnigatsu youka, 十二月八日)
1950	Yukio Mishima	Junpaku no yoru (純白の夜)
1959	Yukio Mishima	Bunshō dokuhon (文章読本)
1959	Seichō Matsumoto	Pro Bono (Kiri no hata, 霧の旗)
1961	Seichō Matsumoto	Shadow Within (Kage no kuruma, 影の車)
1964	Yukio Mishima	The Music (Ongaku, 音楽)
1971-1972	Junichi Watanabe	Akan ni hatsu (阿寒に果つ)

== See also ==
- Bluestocking (magazine)
- Fujin Gahō
- Shufu no Tomo
- Shōjo no Tomo
- Shōjo Sekai
- Shōjo Friend
- Hisae Sawachi
