= Fumiko Hayashi (author) =

Japanese novelist and poet (1903–1951)

- 林 芙美子
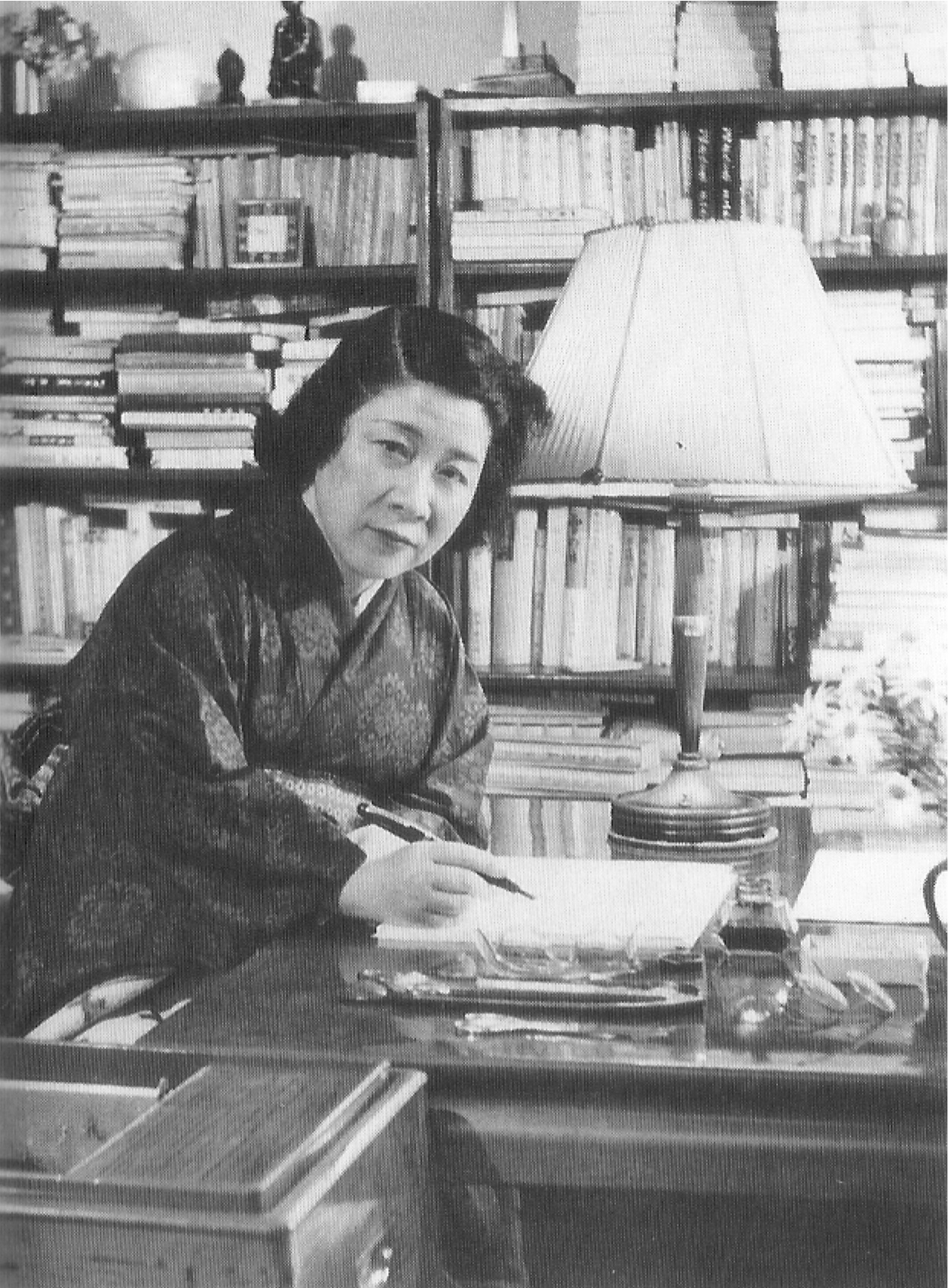
- Born: December 31, 1903; Moji-ku, Kitakyūshū, Japan
- Died: June 28, 1951 (aged 47); Tokyo, Japan
- Occupation: Writer
- Writing career
- Language: Japanese

Fumiko Hayashi (林芙美子, Hayashi Fumiko; December 31, 1903 – June 28, 1951) was a Japanese writer of novels, short stories and poetry, who has repeatedly been included in the feminist literature canon. Among her best-known works are Diary of a Vagabond, Late Chrysanthemum and Floating Clouds.

== Biography ==
Hayashi was born in Moji-ku, Kitakyūshū, (Note: Shimonoseki, Yamaguchi, has also been cited as her birthplace) Japan, and raised in abject poverty. In 1910, her mother Kiku Hayashi divorced her merchant husband Mayaro Miyata (who was not Fumiko's biological father) and married Kisaburo Sawai. The family then worked as itinerant merchants in Kyūshū.

After graduating from high school in 1922, Hayashi moved to Tokyo and lived with several men, supporting herself with a variety of jobs, before settling into marriage with painting student Rokubin Tezuka in 1926. During this time, she also helped launch the poetry magazine Futari. Her autobiographical novel Diary of a Vagabond (Hōrōki), published in 1930, became a bestseller and gained her high popularity. Many of her subsequent works also showed an autobiographical background, like The Accordion and the Fish Town or Seihin no sho. In the following years, Hayashi travelled to China and Europe.

Starting in 1938, Hayashi, who had joined the Pen butai ("Pen corps"), war correspondents who were in favour of Japan's militarist regime, wrote reports about the Sino-Japanese War. In 1941, she joined a group of women writers, including Ineko Sata, who went to Manchuria in occupied China. In 1942–43, again as part of a larger group of women writers, she travelled to Southeast Asia, where she spent eight months in the Andaman Islands, Singapore, Java and Borneo. In later years, Hayashi faced criticism for collaborating with state-sponsored wartime propaganda, but, unlike Sata, never apologised or rationalised her behaviour.

Writer Yoshiko Shibaki observed a shift from poetic sentiment towards harsh reality in Hayashi's post-war work, which depicted the effects of the war on the lives of its survivors, as in the short story Downtown. In 1948, she was awarded the 3rd Women Literary Award for her short story Late Chrysanthemum (Bangiku). Her last novel Meshi, which appeared in serialised form in the Asahi Shimbun, remained unfinished due to her sudden death.

Hayashi died of myocardial infarction on June 28, 1951, survived by her husband and her adopted son. Her funeral was officiated by writer and friend Yasunari Kawabata. Hayashi's house in Shinjuku Ward, Tokyo, was later turned into a museum, the Hayashi Fumiko Memorial Hall. In Onomichi, where Hayashi had lived in her teen years, a bronze figure was erected in her memory.

== Themes and legacy ==
Many of Hayashi's stories revolve around free spirited women and troubled relationships. Joan E. Ericson's 1997 translations and analysis of the immensely popular Diary of a Vagabond and Narcissus suggest that Hayashi's appeal is rooted in the clarity with which she conveys the humanity not just of women, but also others on the underside of Japanese society. In addition, Ericson questions the factuality of her autobiographical writings and expresses a critical view of scholars who take these writings by word instead of, as has been done with male writers, seeing a literary imagination at work which transforms the personal experience, not simply mirrors it.

In Japanese Women Writers: Twentieth Century Short Fiction, Noriko Mizuta Lippit and Kyoko Iriye Selden point out that, other than her autobiographical portrayals of women, Hayashi's later stories are "pure fiction finished with artistic mastery". Hayashi herself explained that she took this step to separate herself from the "retching confusion" of Diary of a Vagabond.

Her writings have been translated into English, French, German, Spanish, Italian, Finnish and other languages.

== Selected works ==
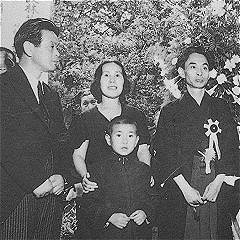
Yasunari Kawabata (right) and other attendants at Hayashi's funeral, 1951

- 1929: I Saw a Pale Horse (Aouma o mitari) – poetry collection. Translated by Janice Brown.
- 1930: Diary of a Vagabond (Hōrōki) – novel. Translated by Joan E. Ericson.
- 1931: The Accordion and the Fish Town (Fukin to uo no machi) – short story. Translated by Janice Brown.
- 1933: Seihin no sho – short story
- 1934: Nakimushi kozo – novel
- 1936: Inazuma – novel
- 1947: Uzushio – novel
- 1947: Downfall (Rinraku) – short story. Translated by J.D. Wisgo.
- 1948: Downtown (Daun taun) – short story. Translated by Ivan Morris.
- 1948: Late Chrysanthemum (Bangiku) – short story. Translated twice by John Bester and Lane Dunlop.
- 1949: Shirosagi – short story
- 1949: Narcissus (Suisen) – short story. Translated twice by Kyoko Iriye Selden and Joan E. Ericson.
- 1950: Chairo no me – novel
- 1951: Floating Clouds (Ukigumo) – novel. Translated twice by Y. Koitabashi and Lane Dunlop.
- 1951: Meshi – novel (unfinished)

== Adaptations (selected) ==
Numerous of Hayashi's works have been adapted into film:

- 1938: Nakimushi kozo, dir. Shirō Toyoda
- 1951: Repast (based on Meshi), dir. Mikio Naruse
- 1952: Lightning (based on Inazuma), dir. Mikio Naruse
- 1953: Wife (based on Chairo no me), dir. Mikio Naruse
- 1954: Late Chrysanthemums (also incorporating the short stories Narcissus and Shirosagi), dir. Mikio Naruse
- 1955: Floating Clouds, dir. Mikio Naruse
- 1962: A Wanderer's Notebook (based on Diary of a Vagabond), dir. Mikio Naruse
- 1986: Wandering Days (anime short, based on Diary of a Vagabond)

Hayashi's biography also served as the basis for theatre plays, notably Kazuo Kikuta's 1961 Hourou-ki, about her early life, and Hisashi Inoue's 2002 Taiko tataite, fue fuite, based on her later years, including her entanglement with the militarist regime.

== Bibliography ==
- Late Chrysanthemum. Vol. 3–4. Translated by Bester, John. Tokyo: Asahi Shimbun. 1956. pp. 468–486.
- A Late Chrysanthemum: Twenty-One Stories from the Japanese. Translated by Dunlop, Lane. San Francisco: North Point Press. 1986. pp. 95–112.
- Downfall and Other Stories. Translated by Wisgo, J.D. Arigatai Books. 2020. ISBN 978-1737318200.
