= Kazumi Takahashi =

Japanese novelist (1931–1971)

- Kazumi Takahashi
- Born: 31 August 1931; Naniwa-ku, Osaka Japan
- Died: May 3, 1971 (aged 39); Shinjuku, Tokyo, Japan
- Occupations: Writer, University professor
- Writing career
- Genre: novelist

Kazumi Takahashi (高橋 和巳, Takahashi Kazumi; 31 August 1931—3 May 1971) was a Japanese novelist and scholar of Chinese literature in Shōwa-era Japan. His wife was fellow writer Takako Takahashi.

== Biography ==
Takahashi was born in Naniwa-ku, Osaka, and was a graduate of Kyoto University. While still a student, he contributed to the Gendai Bungaku literary magazine. He was encouraged to study the Chinese language and Chinese history by fellow writer Eiji Yoshikawa. He became a professor at Ritsumeikan University in Kyoto in 1959. During the widespread violent student protest movements in the 1960s against the Treaty of Mutual Cooperation and Security between the United States and Japan, Takahashi was an outspoken supporter of the radical student movement. He moved to Meiji University briefly in 1966 before returning to Kyoto University in 1967.

His novel Hi no utsuwa (“Vessel of Sorrow”, 1962), depicts the fall of a university dean from respectability due to his self-centered love affairs. Other works include Yuutsu naru Toha (“A Melancholy Faction”, 1965) and Jashumon (“Heretical Faith”, 1965–66).

Takahashi died of colon cancer at the age of 39. His grave is at the Fuji Reien Cemetery in Shizuoka Prefecture.
