= Samuel E. Perry =

Samuel Perry
- Born: October 30, 1969 (age 56); New York, USA
- Occupation: professor

Samuel Perry (born October 30, 1969) is Associate Professor of East Asian Studies at Brown University. Having grown up on the East Side of Providence, RI, and attended Moses Brown and Classical High School, he went on to study at Brown University and the University of Chicago. Now a specialist on Japanese and Korean history, culture and literature, he is the author of several books on leftist cultures of activism around the globe, including Recasting Red Culture in Proletarian Japan: Childhood, Korea, and the Historical Avant-garde. He is also the translator of Kang Kyŏng-ae 강경애's novel From Wŏnso Pond as well as a collection of stories Five Faces of Feminism by Ineko Sata 佐多稲子, aided by a 2013 National Endowment for the Arts Translation Fellowship.

Perry's latest books, anthologies of Queer Korean literature, were published in 2023 by the Modern Language Association in Korean and English versions under the titles A Century of Queer Korean Fiction and 한국의 퀴어 문학: 한 세기. He is now working on a book called "Bad Gays: Japan" which explores the intersections of queerness and colonialism in 20th century Japan. Another forthcoming book manuscript is a cultural history of the Korean War in Japan, a book he began writing in 2016 while on an ACLS Fellowship at CRASSH at the University of Cambridge. This book will retell a story of cultural production during the Korean War, which involves the experiences of communist party activists, Japan-resident Koreans, "returnees" from the colonies, former soldiers and sex workers.

According to his Brown University webpage, Perry is "interested in the role culture plays in political change"; his academic work "aligns itself with a body of scholarship that has reassessed activist formations around the world, and seeks to understand the strategies by which marginalized people have contested dominant cultures." A full list of his publications is available on his website. His most recent research in this area has brought him into conversation about cultural and political connections between Japan, South Korea and Vietnam, where he recently attended Vietnamese language school while on sabbatical.

== Life ==
Perry is the son of a former Rhode Island College Professor of Sociology, Donald Perry, and long-time Rhode Island State Senator, Rhoda Perry. He graduated with an AB from Brown University in 1991 and a PhD from the University of Chicago in 2007. He spent a year as a postdoctoral fellow at Harvard University. He also attended universities in Japan, South Korea and Germany, and was for several years a high school teacher at Phillips Exeter Academy in Exeter, NH.

== Translations ==
- PARK Sang Young, "Yundo is Back" (박상영, "윤도가 돌아왔다", 2017), in Perry's 2023 A Century of Queer Korean Fiction.
- YI Seoyoung, "My Queer Year of Junior High" (이서영, "3학년2반", 2016), in Perry's 2023 A Century of Queer Korean Fiction.
- KIM Bi, "Saltwater Baths" (김비, "해수탕", 2006), in Perry's 2023 A Century of Queer Korean Fiction.
- O Chŏnghŭi, "Traditional Solo" (오정희, "산조(散調)", 1970), in Perry's 2023 A Century of Queer Korean Fiction.
- YU Sŭngjin, "Struggling amid this Despair" (유승진, "이 절망(絕望)속에 부림치고...", 1965), in Perry's 2023 A Century of Queer Korean Fiction.
- CH’OE Chŏnghŭi, "Spring" (최정희, "봄", 1950), in Perry's 2023 A Century of Queer Korean Fiction.
- YI Kiyŏng, "Spring" (이기영, "봄", 1940), in Perry's 2023 A Century of Queer Korean Fiction.
- KIM Sunyŏng, "Dear Sister, I’m Off to the Moon" (김순영, "언니 저 달나라로", 1933), in Perry's 2023 A Century of Queer Korean Fiction.
- YI Kwangsu, "Yun Kwangho" (이광수, "윤광호(尹光浩)", 1933), in Perry's 2023 A Century of Queer Korean Fiction.
- KIM Chŏnghan, "Letters from Okinawa" (김종한, "오키나와에서 편지", 1977), in Ruth Baraclough, Jin-kyung Lee, and Lee Sang-kyung, ed., Island Ablaze: North and South Korean Stories about the US Empire. (Ithaca, NY: Cornell East Asian Series, 2024).
- YANG Sŏgil, "In Shinjuku" (新宿にて, 1978), in John Lie, ed., Zainichi Literature: Japanese Writings by Ethnic Koreans. (Berkeley, CA: Institute of East Asian Studies, 2019).
- CHANG Hyŏk-chu, “Hell of the Starving” (餓鬼道, 1932), in Heather Bowen-Struyk and Norma Field, eds. Literature for Revolution: An Anthology of Japanese Proletarian Writings. (Chicago, IL: University of Chicago Press, 2017).
- KOBAYASHI Takiji, "Letter" (テガミ, 1931), (and other works of 'wall fiction' (壁小説)) in Heather Bowen-Struyk and Norma Field, eds. Literature for Revolution: An Anthology of Japanese Proletarian Writings. (Chicago, University of Chicago Press, 2017).
- SATA Ineko, Five Faces of Japanese Feminism: Crimson and Other Works. Translated and introduced by Samuel Perry. (Honolulu, HI: University of Hawai`i Press, 2016).
- KANG Kyŏng-ae, From Wŏnso Pond 인간문제. Translated and introduced by Samuel Perry. (New York, NY: The Feminist Press, 2009). ISBN 978-1-55861-601-1
- SONG Yŏng, "The Blast Furnace". In Theodore Hughes, Sang-Kyung Lee, Jae-Yong Kim & Jin-kyung Lee, eds., Rat Fire: Korean Stories from the Japanese Empire (Ithaca, NY: Cornell East Asia Series, 2014). ISBN 978-1933947877
- SATA Ineko, "White and Purple" (白と紫, 1950) Translator's Introduction to "White and Purple"
