= Fusako Kushi =

Japanese writer (1903–1986)

- 久志芙沙子
- Born: 久志芙ツル; 1903; Shuri, Okinawa
- Died: 1986 (aged 82–83)
- Occupation: Writer
- Writing career
- Notable work: Memoirs of a Declining Ryukyuan Woman (滅びゆく琉球女の手記)

Fusako Kushi (久志 芙沙子, Kushi Fusako; 1903–1986) was a female writer from Okinawa. Her most notable work is Memoirs of a Declining Ryukyuan Woman (Horobiyuku ryukyu-onna no shuki, 滅びゆく琉球女の手記), which was received with hostility and outrage.

== Biography ==
Kushi Fusako was born in Shuri, Okinawa in 1903. She graduated from an all-girls high school in Okinawa and worked as an elementary school teacher before moving to Tokyo to pursue a career in writing at the age of 27.

=== Memoirs of a Declining Ryukyuan Woman ===
In 1932, Kushi submitted Memoirs of a Declining Ryukyuan Woman to Fujin Kōron, a women's magazine, which incorporated themes of social discrimination and loss of her home and culture experienced due to her identity as Ryukyuan.

==== Criticism ====
The Okinawa Prefecture Student Association in Tokyo condemned Kushi's work severely, accusing her of portraying Okinawan people in the same class as the Ainu people and the Korean people. Although Memoirs of a Declining Ryukyuan Woman was initially planned to be published as a serial novel, the backlash prevented the publication of the rest of her Memoir series.

==== The "Defense" ====
In the following month's issue of the Fujin Koron, Kushi published a rebuttal work titled "In the Defense of Memoirs of a Declining Ryukyuan Woman," which challenged critics' internalized prejudice concerning gender and ethnicity.

Kushi wrote,

"Their outraged claims that what I wrote “demeans” and “discriminates against” Okinawans reveals, paradoxically, their own racial prejudice toward Ainu and Koreans. I don’t care whether Okinawans are identified with Ainu or with “pure Japanese” because I firmly believe that, despite superficial differences resulting from environmental conditions, we are all Asians and equal as human beings. It was in this sense that I used the word “people,” and certainly not to insult the Okinawan people of whom I myself am one."

After the publication of the "Defense," Kushi retired from writing and never wrote again.
