= Ineko Sata =

Japanese writer

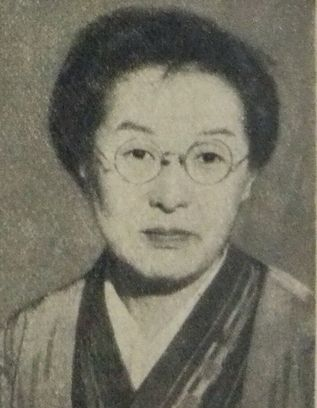
- Born: Sata Ine; 1 June 1904; Nagasaki, Japan
- Died: 12 October 1998 (aged 94); Tokyo, Japan
- Occupation: Writer
- Literary movement: Proletarian Literature Movement

Ineko Sata (佐多 稲子, Sata Ineko, 1 June 1904 – 12 October 1998), also Ineko Kubokawa (窪川稲子, Kubokawa Ineko), born Ine Sata (佐田 イネ, Sata Ine), was a Japanese writer closely connected to the Proletarian Literature Movement. An advocate of women's rights, she has also repeatedly been linked to the feminist movement.

== Biography ==
=== Early life and career ===
Born in Nagasaki to young, unmarried parents (her father was 18, her mother 15), the family moved to Tokyo while she was still a child. Her first job was in a caramel factory, but she later went on to work in restaurants where she befriended several writers, including Ryūnosuke Akutagawa. In 1922, her poems were published for the first time in the magazine Shi to jinsei ("Poetry and life").

Working at the Koroku café-bar in Hongo near Tokyo University, she met Shigeharu Nakano, who would remain a lifelong friend. Along with left-wing writers Tatsuo Hori and Tsurujirō Kubokawa, Nakano ran the progressive literary magazine Roba ("Donkey"). Nakano urged Sata to write her first short story, Kyarameru kōjō kara ("From the Caramel Factory"), which was based on her own experiences and published in 1928. Taking her second husband Tsurujirō Kubokawa's (Note: After a brief first marriage, Sata married Kubokawa in 1926 or 1929, depending on the source. Already in 1928, her short story Kanojora nokaiwa was published in Senki magazine under the name Kubokawa Ineko.) family name and slightly modifying her first name, she published her work as Ineko Kubokawa until around 1940.

While praised by writers like Yasunari Kawabata for drawing on modernist literary techniques, Sata became increasing involved in issues related to workers and the labor movement. In 1929, she spoke out against the treatment of women workers in cigarette factories. In 1931, she defended the striking workers of the Tokyo Muslin Factory. As a member of the Proletarian Literature Movement, she wrote a series of stories about the lives of ordinary working men and women. These included Kyosei kikoku ("Compulsory Extradition"), about the rights of migrant Korean workers, and Tears of a Factory Girl in the Union Leadership (Kanbu joko no namida), both published in 1931.

In 1932, she joined the outlawed Japan Communist Party (JCP). She became close to JCP leaders Kenji Miyamoto and Takiji Kobayashi, the former imprisoned until 1945, the latter tortured to death by police in 1933. Sata's strong opinions were also often at odds with the official Communist Party platform. In 1935, she was arrested for anti-war activism and spent two months in jail. This experience is described in part in her 1936–38 novel Crimson (Kurenai), a fictionalised account of her marriage and the struggles of being a mother, wife and professional writer.

By 1940, Sata, like Fumiko Hayashi, eventually collaborated with the authorities, publishing both diaries of her travels in Korea and Manchuria and "home front" stories in support of the Japanese war effort, for which she later faced criticism by former associates.

=== Later career ===
In 1945, with the end of the Pacific War, she divorced her husband Kubokawa. In 1946, she rejoined the JCP, although, as before, she often voiced vehement criticism of the party. Also in 1946, she was one of the founding members of the Women's Democratic Club, along socialist politician Shizue Katō and intellectuals like Setsuko Hani and Yuriko Miyamoto. Her wartime experiences were the subject of Watashi no Tōkyō chizu ("My Tokyo Map"), which was written between 1946 and 1948. 1953 saw the first post-war reprint of Crimson, which was received favourably by critics. In 1954, she wrote Kikai no naka no seishun ("Youth among the Machines"). The first collection of her works was issued in 15 volumes in 1958–59. She would write Onna no yado ("Women's Lodgings") in 1963 and Omoki nagare ni ("On a Heavy Tide") in 1968–69.

By 1964, Sata had rejoined the JCP after yet another expulsion. Her activities in the Women's Democratic Club, judged divisive from the perspective of the party mainstream, again led to her expulsion from the JCP. In Keiryu (1964), Sata portrayed the party's internal conflicts.

Sata was awarded the Noma Literary Prize in 1972 for her book Juei ("The Shade of Trees"), which deals with the relationships between Chinese and Japanese people in Nagasaki after the dropping of the atomic bomb, and the (fictionalised) biography of painter Kiyoshi Ikeno (1930–1960), which had already served as basis for her 1961 short story The Colorless Paintings. In 1973, she was offered the Geijutsuin Onshi-shō (Imperial Art Academy Prize) for her life's work, but she refused the award as she regarded it as a nationalist congratulation prize. She accepted the 1976 Kawabata Yasunari Literature Award for one of the stories in her short story collection Toki ni tatsu.

In 1983, Sata received the Asahi Prize for the entire body of her work. She gave an acceptance speech which expressed regret for her contributions to the war effort. Her book about Nakano (who had died in 1979), Natsu no Shiori – Nakano Shigeharu o okuru ("Memories of Summer – a Farewell to Shigeharu Nakano"), was awarded the Mainichi Art Award in 1983.

Ineko Sata died in Tokyo in 1998.

== Selected works ==
The year refers to the first publication.

- 1928: Kyarameru kōjō kara
- 1929: Café Kyoto (Resutoran Rakuyō)
- 1931: Tears of a Factory Girl in the Union Leadership (Kanbu joko no namida)
- 1931: Kyosei kikoku
- 1936–38: Crimson (Kurenai)
- 1940: Suashi no musume
- 1942: Kō ni niou (short story collection)
- 1949: Watashi no Tōkyō chizu
- 1950: White and Purple (Shiro to murasaki)
- 1955: Kikai no naka no seishun
- 1955: Memory of a Night (Yoru no kioku)
- 1958–59: Sata Ineko shū (collected works)
- 1959: Hai iro no gogo
- 1961: The Colorless Paintings (Iro no nai e)
- 1963: Onna no yado (short story collection)
- 1964: Keiryu
- 1966: Sozō
- 1970: Omoki nagare ni
- 1972: Juei
- 1972: The Inn of Dancing Snow (Yuki no mau yado)
- 1975: Toki ni tatsu (short story collection)
- 1977–1979: Sata Ineko zenshū (complete works)
- 1983: Natsu no Shiori – Nakano Shigeharu o okuru
- 1986: Camellia Blossoms on the Little Mountain (Chiisana yama to tsubaki no hana)

== Awards ==
- 1963: Women's Literature Award for Onna no yado
- 1972: Noma Literary Prize for Juei
- 1976: Kawabata Yasunari Literature Award for Toki ni tatsu (11)
- 1983: Asahi Prize for her complete work
- 1983: Mainichi Art Award for Natsu no Shiori – Nakano Shigeharu o okuru

== Translations ==
Most of Sata's work was translated into Russian in the 1960s and 1970s, and selected stories have been translated into French and German. English translations include:

- Sata, Ineko (1980). Atsumi, Ikuko; Simpson, Diane L. (eds.). "Re-encounter (Toki ni tatsu)". Feminist International No. 2: Asian Women '80.
- Sata, Ineko (1966). "Clay Doll (Doro ningyo)". In Jose, F. Sionil (ed.). Asian P.E.N. Anthology. Translated by Bester, John. New York: Taplinger.
- Sata, Ineko (1979). "The Caramel Factory". "The Caramel Factory" by Sata Ineko : Biography of Author, Translation and Discussion : An Extended Essay (PDF) (Thesis). Translated by Flowers, Yvette. Christchurch: University of Canterbury.
- Sata, Ineko (1985). "The Colorless Paintings (Iro no nai e)". In Ōe, Kenzaburō (ed.). The Crazy Iris and Other Stories of the Atomic Aftermath. New York: Grove Press.
- Sata, Ineko (1987). "Camellia Blossoms on the Little Mountain (Chiisana yama to tsubaki no hana)". Japanese Literature Today. Translated by Jewel, Mark. P.E.N. Club.
- Sata, Ineko (1987). "Crimson (Kurenai, excerpt)". In Tanaka, Yukiko (ed.). To Live and to Write: Selections by Japanese Women Writers, 1913-1938. Seattle: The Seal Press.
- Sata, Ineko; Vernon, Victoria V. (1988). "The Inn of Dancing Snow (Yuki no mau yado)". Daughters of the Moon: Wish, Will, and Social Constraint in Fiction by Modern Japanese Women. University of California Institute of East Asian Studies.
- Sata, Ineko (1991). "Memory of a Night (Yoru no kioku)". In Lippit, Noriko Mizuta; Selden, Kyoko Iriye (eds.). Japanese Women Writers: Twentieth Century Short Fiction. Routledge.
- Sata, Ineko (1997). "Water (Mizu, from the short story collection Onna no yado)". In Sabin, Burritt (ed.). Stories from the East. The East Publications.
- Sata, Ineko (April–June 1999). "Water (Mizu)". Japan Quarterly. Translated by Kirkup, James; Nakano, Michio. Asahi Shimbun.
- Sata, Ineko (2002). "Elegy (excerpt from My Tokyo Map / Watashi no Tōkyō chizu)". Tokyo Stories: A Literary Stroll. Translated by Rogers, Lawrence. University of California Press.
- Sata, Ineko (2016). "Café Kyoto (Resutoran Rakuyō), Crimson (Kurenai), The Scent of Incense (Kō ni niou, from the short story collection of the same name), Tears of a Factory Girl in the Union Leadership (Kanbu joko no namida), White and Purple (Shiro to murasaki)". Five Faces of Japanese Feminism: Crimson and Other Works. Translated by Perry, Samuel. Honolulu: University of Hawai'i Press.

== Adaptations ==
Some of Sata's stories were adapted into films, including:

- 1956: Kodomo no me, director Yoshirō Kawazu
- 1957: Suashi no musume, director Yutaka Abe
- 1965: Ane to imōto, director Yoshirō Kawazu
