= From the Caramel Factory =

1928 Japanese short story

- Author: Ineko Sata
- Original title: キャラメル工場から
- Language: Japanese
- Genre: Proletarian literature
- Publisher: Proletarian Arts (magazine); Senkisha (book)
- Publication date: 1928, 1930
- Publication place: Japan
- Media type: Print

From the Caramel Factory (キャラメル工場から, Kyarameru kōjō kara) is a 1928 short story by Japanese writer Ineko Sata. It was Sata's first published short story, and an exponent of Japanese Proletarian Literature.

== Plot ==
To support her family, 13-year-old Hiroko is forced to quit school and start working in a caramel factory by her unemployed father. There she witnesses the precarious working conditions of the factory girls, who suffer physical pain from working in the unheated facility and are forced to pay their meals from their meager salary. When the payment is switched from a fixed wage to a piece rate system, Hiroko's salary is reduced by two thirds. Her father, dissatisfied with Hiroko's income, which also pays her tram tickets, has her quit the factory job and start working in a noodle shop instead. One day, Hiroko receives a letter from her former school teacher at the shop, who writes that he will try to raise money so she can at least finish elementary school. Hiroko locks herself in the toilet and starts crying.

== Publication and background ==
From the Caramel Factory was based on Sata's own biography, who had to leave school at an early age and support her family by working in a caramel factory. Initially, Sata had sketched the story as a short essay, intended as a contribution to the Proletarian Literature movement to whose members she had become acquainted, but writer and political activist Shigeharu Nakano urged her to lengthen it. The story was published in the February 1928 edition of Proletarian Art (Puroretaria geijutsu) magazine, and in book form in 1930 by Senkisha as volume 8 in the Japan Proletarian Writers' Series (Nihon puroretaria sakka soshō) in a print run of three thousand. It was repeatedly reprinted in later years.

== Translations ==
From the Caramel Factory has been translated into German and Czech language. It has not seen a book publication in English yet, but is available in English translation as part of a thesis downloadable at the University of Canterbury, New Zealand. It has also been translated by Victoria Vernon Nakagawa for her 1981 dissertation Three Japanese Women Writers: Higuchi Ichiyō, Sata Ineko and Kurahashi Yumiko.
