= The Accordion and the Fish Town =

1931 Japanese short story

- Short story by Fumiko Hayashi
- Original title: Fūkin to uo no machi
- Translator: Janice Brown
- Country: Japan
- Language: Japanese

Publication
- Published in: Kaizō
- Publication type: Magazine
- Media type: Print
- Publication date: 1931
- Published in English: 1997

The Accordion and the Fish Town (Japanese: 風琴と魚の町, Hepburn: Fūkin to uo no machi) is an autobiographical short story by Japanese writer Fumiko Hayashi first published in 1931. It follows a fourteen-year-old girl, Masako, the daughter of a poor itinerant merchant who settles with his family in the town of Onomichi, Hiroshima Prefecture.

== Plot ==
On their way to Osaka, Masako and her parents pass the port town of Onomichi, where a festival is taking place. Her father, a peddler, decides to make a stop, hoping for good business with his potions which he sells as "medicine" while accompanying his praises with his accordion. The maturing Masako is constantly hungry, for which she is repeatedly scolded and even slapped by her mother, who argues that they have no money. The father's business is a success, so he rents a small, unclean flat and sends Masako to school, where she is mocked by her schoolmates as the daughter of "O-ichi-ni", a Charlie Chaplin character. A rainy season sets in, and the family's financial situation tightens. The father has to pledge his accordion, while the mother earns money by doing piece work.

Later, the father starts selling "beauty potions" which he received from a different manufacturer. When it turns out that the potions consist merely of flour, he is taken to the police station, where he is beaten and humiliated in front of his wife and daughter. Masako runs away, saddened, ashamed and angry, with "the sound of cogwheels ringing in my ears forever".

== Publication history and legacy ==
After her widely popular autobiographical novel Diary of a Vagabond (Hōrōki, 1930), Hayashi experimented with a non-autobiographical approach with her short story Senshun fu, which was not well received. With The Accordion and the Fish Town, first published in the April 1931 edition of Kaizō magazine, and Seihin no sho (November 1931), she successfully returned to the autobiographical form and established herself as an accomplished prose writer. She had sketched a first draft of the story already in 1926 during a return to her parents in Onomichi. Like the character of Masako, the teen-aged Hayashi had settled down with her mother and her peddler foster father in Onomichi in 1914, where she attended the higher school.

The Accordion and the Fish Town has seen various reprintings after World War II, and has repeatedly been adapted for Japanese television. A bronze figure of Hayashi was erected in Onomichi in her memory.

== Translations ==
The Accordion and the Fish Town first appeared in English in a translation provided by Janice Brown in 1997. A translation into German by Kakuji Watanabe appeared in 1960. Another English translation was done in 2024 by J.D. Wisgo.

== Bibliography ==
- Hayashi, Fumiko (1988). "風琴と魚の町 (Fūkin to uo no machi)". In Inoue, Yasushi (ed.). 昭和文学全集 (Shōwa bungaku zenshu). Vol. 8. Tokyo: Shōgakukan.
- Hayashi, Fumiko (2007). 風琴と魚の町/清貧の書 (Fūkin to uo no machi/Seihin no sho). Tokyo: Shinchōsha.
