= Bangiku (short story) =

1948 Japanese short story

- Short story by Fumiko Hayashi
- Translator: John Bester (1956); Lane Dunlop (1986)
- Language: Japanese

Publication
- Published in: Bungei Shunjū
- Publication type: Magazine
- Publication date: 1948
- Publication place: Japan
- Published in English: 1956, 1986
- Media type: Print

Bangiku (Japanese: 晩菊, Hepburn: Bangiku), translated into English as A Late Chrysanthemum and Late Chrysanthemum, is a short story by Japanese writer Fumiko Hayashi, first published in 1948. It received the Women's Literary Award the same year and was later adapted into a film. The story describes an ageing ex-geisha who makes preparations to meet a former lover while reflecting on her past life.

== Plot ==
56-year-old ex-geisha Kin receives a phone call from her former lover Tabe, with whom she had a passionate affair before he was drafted as an officer into the Pacific War. While making preparations for meeting the much younger Tabe, eager to look as youthful as possible, she reflects on her past life. Fleeing from an abusive acquaintance of her adoptive parents, she became a geisha, whose portrait was even printed on magazine covers and postcards, and based her relationships with men mainly on materialistic terms. Kin survived the war as an owner of a house and now makes her income as a money lender and by speculating in the real estate business. When Tabe finally arrives, Kin is disappointed by the commonness of his appearance and the fact that he wants to borrow money from her. Tabe gets drunk and aggressive, outraged even more by Kin's refusal to lend him money than her rejection of his advances. While he is out of the room, Kin, disgusted by his behaviour, burns a photograph of him which she had kept through the years.

== Publishing history ==
Bangiku was first published in the November 1948 edition of Bungei Shunjū magazine and in book form by Shinchōsha in 1952.

== Translations ==
Hayashi's story was first translated into English by John Bester as Late Chrysanthemum in 1956 and later by Lane Dunlop as A Late Chrysanthemum in 1986.

== Reception ==
Reviewing Lane Dunlops new translation for the anthology A Late Chrysanthemum: Twenty-One Stories from the Japanese, Stephen Mansfield, writing for The Japan Times, described the title-giving story as "a poignant and meticulously detailed portrait of a woman in her late 50s", resonating, like the other stories included, with "pathos and resigned maturity".

== Adaptations ==
Bangiku was adapted into a film in 1954, Late Chrysanthemums, scripted by Sumie Tanaka and directed by Mikio Naruse. The film also incorporated Hayashi's stories Shirasagi and Suisen (both 1949).

An adaptation for Japanese television was screened in 1960.

== Bibliography ==
- Japan Quarterly. Vol. 3–4. Translated by Bester, John. Tokyo: Asahi Shinbun. 1956. pp. 468–486.
- A Late Chrysanthemum: Twenty-One Stories from the Japanese. Translated by Dunlop, Lane. San Francisco: North Point Press. 1986. pp. 95–112.
