= List of The Rose of Versailles chapters =

The Rose of Versailles (ベルサイユのばら, Berusaiyu no Bara), also called BeruBara, is a shōjo manga series by Riyoko Ikeda published by Shueisha in Margaret from 1972 to 1973. It later was adapted into an anime, The Rose of Versailles. The series was published on 21 May 1972, in the Shueisha Margaret magazine's 21st edition. Publication lasted 82 weeks. The series garnered much acclaim, and topped sales ranks regularly. The serialization of the manga finished in the autumn of 1973, with the publication of the last installment in the 52nd edition of the magazine.

In 1983, the first two volumes of The Rose of Versailles were translated in English by Frederik L. Schodt for the purpose of teaching English to Japanese speakers and released in North America by the North American branch of Sanyusha. It has been licensed in French by Kana, in Spanish by Azake Ediciones, German by Carlsen, Italian by d-world, and in Chinese by Tong Li Publishing.

In July 2015, Udon Entertainment announced that it had acquired English-language publishing rights for The Rose of Versailles. Originally scheduled for release in 2016, the first volume in the five-volume hardcover series was released in January 2020, while the final volume was released in April 2021.

== Volume list ==
| No. | Title | Release date | ISBN |
|---|---|---|---|
| 01 | 新しい運命のうずの中に (Atarashii unmei no uzu no naka ni, In the Waves of New Destiny) | November 1972 | 978-4-08-850106-2 |
Marie Antoinette becomes Dauphine of France. At court, she is determined not to acknowledge Madame du Barry, her father-in-law's mistress.
| 02 | 栄光の座によいしれて (Eikou no za ni yoishirete, Basking in the Seat of Glory) | November 1972 | 978-4-08-850108-6 |
Marie Antoinette begins openly favoring Fersen. The King dies and Madame du Barry is sent to a convent. Fersen returns to Sweden. Marie Antoinette spends money lavishly on friends and fashion, despite Oscar telling her that France's finances are in a dire state, and other ladies follow the queen's example. Rosalie looks for work, and is given a livre by Oscar. Rosalie's neighbour, a young boy, steals from a Duke's carriage and the Duke kills him. Oscar sees this but can do nothing, but later in court speaks of it and is challenged to a duel. The queen banishes Oscar from court for a month. During this month, the Queen meets the Countess de Polingac, who becomes her close friend. In Arras, Oscar meets Robespierre, who tells her that the people are becoming disenchanted with their spendthrift queen. The Countess asks Marie Antoinette for money.
| 03 | ゆるされざる恋 (Yurusarezaru koi, Forbidden Love) | April 1973 | 978-4-08-850116-1 |
| 04 | 黒い騎士をとらえろ (Kuroi kishi wo toraero, Catch the Black Knight) | 1973 | 978-4-08-850124-6 |
| 05 | オスカルの苦しみ (Osukaru no kurushimi, Oscar's Suffering) | 1973 | 978-4-08-850131-4 |
| 06 | 燃えあがる革命の火 (Moeagaru kakumei no hi, Flames of the Revolution) | 1973 | 978-4-08-850137-6 |
| 07 | 美しき愛の誓い (Utsukushiki ai no chikai, Vows of Beautiful Love) | 20 February 1974 | 978-4-08-850142-0 |
| 08 | Kami ni mesarete (神にめされて, God's Summon) | 20 March 1974 | 978-4-08-850145-1 |
| 09 | Itamashii ouhi no saigo (いたましい王妃の最後, The End of the Sorrowful Queen) | 20 April 1974 | 978-4-08-850148-2 |
| 10 | Gaiden: Kokui no Hakushaku Fujin (外伝: 黒衣の伯爵夫人, Side Story: The Countess in Black) | 20 May 1974 | 978-4-08-850151-2 |
Oscar, André and Rosalie go in Vendée to visit Hortense de la Lorancy, Oscar's first older sister. While driving to the Lorancys', Oscar's carriage is outrun by another carriage with an elegant lady and a beautiful young man sitting in it. When the three arrive, they are met by Hortense and her cheeky daughter Loulou, a girl of six years old. During a conversation, Hortense comments to her visitors on the strange disappearances of young women that lately were happening in the place where she lives and that is speculated that a sect of vampires is involved. Hortense decides to organize a ball in honor of Oscar. During the ball, they meet a capricious girl called Caroline de Roufebiur, who takes an immediate liking to Oscar and thus is overly jealous of Rosalie for her closeness to Oscar. At the same ball, the same woman Oscar had seen in the carriage attends. She is called Elizabeth, Countess de Montclaire. Oscar is introduced to this woman by Hortense. At first the Countess appears to be a friendly person, taking care of Rosalie after she has been humiliated by Caroline. The next day, Oscar, André, Rosalie, Caroline and Loulou go on a picnic in the forest. After Caroline pretends to have sprained her ankle so that Oscar must come looking for her in the forest, the group eventually loses their way and aren't able to return to the mansion. Luckily, they find themselves near the Montclaire mansion, where Elizabeth receives them warmly as guests. After dinner Caroline takes Rosalie along to go find Lionel, the beautiful nephew of the Countess, deciding that if she can't marry Oscar she can at least marry Lionel and inherit the Montclaire fortune, for Lionel is the sole relative of the Countess. Rosalie refuses and Caroline goes off alone. While she is killed by Lionel, who has in fact been a puppet built by a famous clockmaker the Countess kidnapped, the Countess and her servants try to kill Oscar, Rosalie and André. They manage to escape with the help of Loulou.
| 11 | - | 25 August 2014 | 978-4088452517 |
| 12 | - | 24 July 2015 | 978-4088454092 |
| 13 | - | 25 January 2017 | 978-4088457017 |
During key moments of her military life, Oscar is haunted by the mirage of a mysterious woman who predicted her great suffering. When she finally realizes that it's her true spirit (a grand lady loyal to the court, wife and mother), she decides to live forever as a soldier. After Oscar's death, her alter ego is trapped forever in a Versailles mirror. Marie Antoinette orders a special watch from the famous Swiss watchmaker Abraham-Louis Breguet and he promises to make one for her. While she is imprisoned in the Conciergerie before her execution, Marie Antoinette asks for a Breguet watch and General de Jarjayes gives her his late wife's Breguet watch. Nine years after Marie Antoinette's death, Breguet completes her watch.
| 14 | - | 23 March 2018 | 978-4088440026 |
Rosalie and François leave Paris to stay Madame de Staël's mansion in Switzerland. During the journey, they learn that Bernard and Alain have died trying to assassinate Napoleon, who they considered a traitor to the revolution since he wants to be emperor, and they are also wanted by the Napoleonic police. Now an immortal of the Poe Clan, Girodelle saves them and sends them to Sweden under the protection of Sophie von Fersen, Hans Axel von Fersen's sister. Thanks to Fersen, François joins the Royal Library, where he meets Fabien Nobel, a scientist who later warns him and Rosalie that the people want kill Fersen. Six years later, Fersen, who has become a broken man after Marie Anotinette's death, is lynched by the mob during the Crown Prince of Sweden's funeral and Nobel is fatally stabbed by one of his comrades for betraying them. After Fersen's funeral, François decides to stay with his mother in Sweden, later becoming the tutor of the future King Oscar I. The old Rosalie dies during the Restoration and is reunited with Bernard in the afterlife.

=== Collected editions ===
Compilations published after the completion of the original manga were also successful, especially among women. The following compilations were published:

| Name | Publisher | Number of volumes | Year of publication |
|---|---|---|---|
| Versailles no Bara – Shueisha | Shueisha | 5 | 1976 |
| Versailles no Bara – Shueisha Manga Bunko | Shueisha | 10 | 1977-1978 |
| Versailles no Bara – Chuko Aizôban | Chuokoron Shinsha | 2 | 1987 |
| Versailles no Bara – Shueisha BunkoChuko Aizôban | Shueisha | 5 | 1994 |
| Versailles no Bara – Shueisha Girls Remix | Shueisha | 4 | 2002-2003 |
| Versailles no Bara – Fairbell Comics | Fairbell | 6 | 2004-2005 |
| Versailles no Bara (Edition Parfaite) | Shueisha | 8 (Note: Note that the 1980s Gaiden is included in this edition as volume 9.) | 2005-2006 |

== Versailles no Bara Gaiden ==
The Versailles no Bara Gaiden series is a collections of short stories written by Riyoko Ikeda. These stories were published in two separate magazines in 1974 (first publication) after the serialization of the manga Rose of Versailles, and 1984–1985 (second publication). The plot revolves around Oscar, André and Rosalie going to visit the first older sister of Oscar, Hortense de la Lorancy.

The first publication of Versailles no Bara Gaiden started weeks after the release of the last chapter of the manga The Rose of Versailles, in 1974. The gaiden was serialized, like the manga, in Margaret magazine. This publication consists of one gaiden, "Kokui no Hakushaku Fujin". "Kokui no Hakushaku Fujin" is situated in 1787, during the incidents of the Black Knight, before André's eye injuring, and is inspired by the legend of the countess Elizabeth Bathory, who tortured and murdered many young women by the end of the 16th century. Further gaiden appeared in Monthly Jam (月刊Jam) published by Chuokoron-sha between June 1984 and April 1985, consisting of four stories. Like the earlier gaiden, it is set prior to the rioting, around the time of the Black Knight. Loulou is the main character, Oscar the co-protagonist, and Marie Antoinette a supporting character.

| No. | Title | Release date | ISBN |
|---|---|---|---|
| 01 | ル・ルーと、いっしょに来た人形 (Ru-rū to, isshoni kita ningyō) | — | — |
| 02 | ジャルジェ将軍の息子あらわる！？ (Jaruje shōgun no musuko arawaru!?) | — | — |
| 03 | トルコの海賊と修道女 (Toruko no kaizoku to shūdōjo) | — | — |
| 04 | 悪魔の薬 (Akuma no kusuri) | — | — |

== BeruBara Kids ==
BeruBara Kids ベルばらKids is a chibi-style Rose of Versailles spin-off by Riyoko Ikeda.

| No. | Release date | ISBN |
|---|---|---|
| 01 | 6 October 2006 | 4-02-330376-3 |
| 02 | 7 August 2007 | 978-4-02-330382-9 |
| 03 | 4 July 2008 | 978-4-02-330394-2 |
| 04 | 9 January 2009 | 978-4-02-330410-9 |
| 05 | 8 January 2010 | 978-4-02-330478-9 |
