= Late Chrysanthemums =

1954 Japanese film

Japanese name
- Kanji: 晩菊
- Directed by: Mikio Naruse
- Written by: Sumie Tanaka; (screenplay); Fumiko Hayashi; (short stories)
- Produced by: Sanezumi Fujimoto
- Starring: Haruko Sugimura; Chikako Hosokawa; Yūko Mochizuki; Sadako Sawamura
- Cinematography: Masao Tamai
- Edited by: Eiji Ooi
- Music by: Ichirō Saitō
- Production company: Toho
- Distributed by: Toho
- Release date: 22 June 1954 (Japan)
- Running time: 101 minutes
- Country: Japan
- Language: Japanese

Late Chrysanthemums (Japanese: 晩菊, Hepburn: Bangiku) is a 1954 Japanese drama film directed by Mikio Naruse and starring Haruko Sugimura, Chikako Hosokawa, Yūko Mochizuki and Sadako Sawamura. It was written by Sumie Tanaka, based on three short stories by Fumiko Hayashi, and follows four retired geisha and their struggles to persevere in post World War II Tokyo.

== Plot ==
Late Chrysanthemums interweaves the lives of four retired geisha, Kin, Tamae, Tomi and Nobu, over a period of four successive days. Kin is a moneylender and a merciless businesswoman, who is insistent upon being repaid by her former geisha sisters Tamae, Tomi and Nobu. Her financial advisor Itaya tries to convince her to buy land in the countryside, as prices are constantly rising.

Tamae and Tomi, both widows, live together. Tamae is plagued by migraines, and as a result, unable to work as frequently as she would like to as a maid in a hotel. She is also unhappy with her son Kiyoshi's relationship with an older mistress, who pays him for being at her service. Tomi is unable to repay her debts as a result of her addiction to gambling. She laments her daughter Sachiko's upcoming marriage to an older man and tries to persuade her against it. Nobu runs a restaurant with her husband, which is frequented by the other women.

Seki, a former customer of Kin, who was sent to prison after he had attempted to kill her and commit suicide, tries to borrow money from her, but is quickly turned away. Kin becomes excited though when she hears that ex-soldier Tabe, her former patron and lover, is returning. To her disappointment, Tabe wants to borrow her money as well. She rejects his request and burns his photograph to erase all remaining memories.

Tamae and Tomi are eventually left alone when Kiyoshi leaves for Hokkaido for a job and Sachiko moves in with her future husband. Kin hears from Nobu that Seki was arrested for a money-related crime, but shrugs it off. She enters the train with Itaya to inspect property in the countryside which she considers buying.

== Cast ==
- Haruko Sugimura as Kin
- Chikako Hosokawa as Tamae
- Yūko Mochizuki as Tomi
- Sadako Sawamura as Nobu
- Ken Uehara as Tabe
- Hiroshi Koizumi as Kiyoshi
- Ineko Arima as Sachiko
- Bontarō Miake as Seki
- Sonosuke Sawamura as Sentarō
- Daisuke Katō as Itaya

== Literary source ==
Late Chrysanthemums is based on Fumiko Hayashi's short stories Bangiku (Late Chrysanthemum, 1948), Shirasagi (1949) and Suisen (Narcissus, 1949). The story Bangiku, on which the episode about the character Kin is based, has been translated into English by Lane Dunlop and is available in the anthology A Late Chrysanthemum: Twenty-One Stories from the Japanese. Narcissus, which inspired the episode with Tamae and Kiyoshi, has been translated by Joan E. Ericson and is included in her book Be a Woman: Hayashi Fumiko and Modern Japanese Women's Literature.

== Reception ==
Late Chrysanthemums ranked #7 in Kinema Junpo's list of the ten best Japanese films of 1954, but also met with reservations. Critics Heiichi Sugimoto and Shinbi Iida acknowledged the characterisation of the female protagonists, which exceeded the stereotypes of films of the time, and the performances of the principal cast (Haruko Sugimura, usually cast in supporting roles, has one of her few starring roles in this film), but faulted a lack of psychological depth compared to Hayashi's original stories.

In retrospect, Late Chrysanthemums is often considered one of Naruse's finest works. In his 2006 review in the Chicago Reader, Jonathan Rosenbaum titled the film a "masterpiece", pointing out its "energy and vivid portraiture". Keith Uhlich of Slant magazine awarded the film a full four stars and called it "Naruse's most perfect film".

== Awards ==
- Blue Ribbon Award for Best Supporting Actress Yūko Mochizuki

== Legacy ==
Late Chrysanthemums was screened at the Berkeley Art Museum and Pacific Film Archive in 1985, the Museum of Modern Art in 1985, the Harvard Film Archive in 2005 and the Gene Siskel Film Center in 2006.

== Home media ==
Late Chrysanthemums was released on DVD by the British Film Institute in 2007 and by Toho in 2021.
