= Han conquest of Old Chosŏn =

Military campaign in 1st century BCE Korean Peninsula

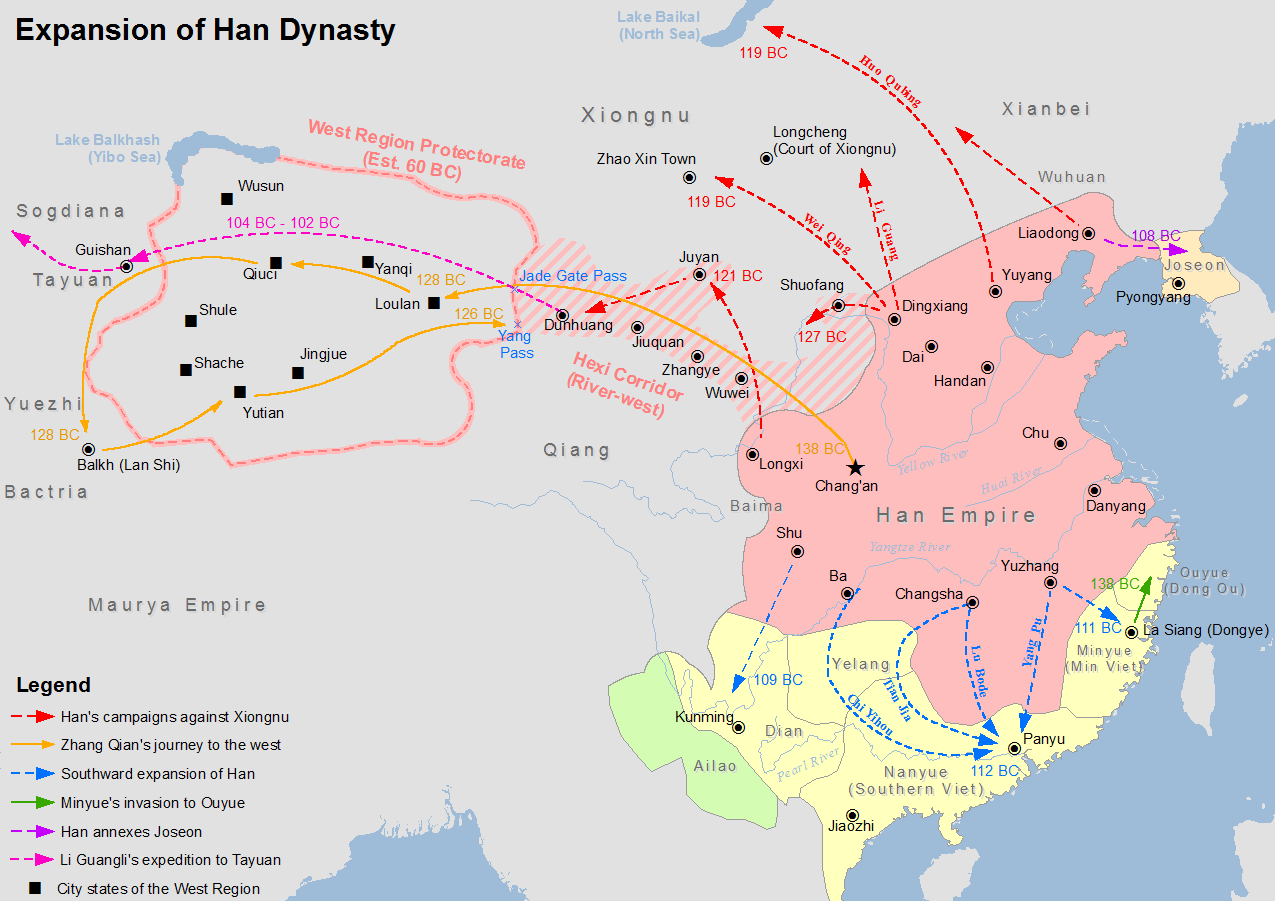
- The expansion of the Han dynasty in 2nd century BC
Date	109–108 BCE
Location	Liaodong Peninsula, Korean Peninsula, Bohai Sea
Result	Han victory
Territorial changes	Conquest of Old Chosŏn; Establishment of four Han commanderies in the Korean Peninsula

Belligerents
Wiman Chosŏn	Han dynasty

Commanders and leaders
King Ugŏ †; Seong Gi †; No In (surrendered); Han Ŭm (surrendered); Sam (surrendered); Wang Kyŏp (surrendered)	Yang Pu; Xun Zhi

Strength
?	50,000+

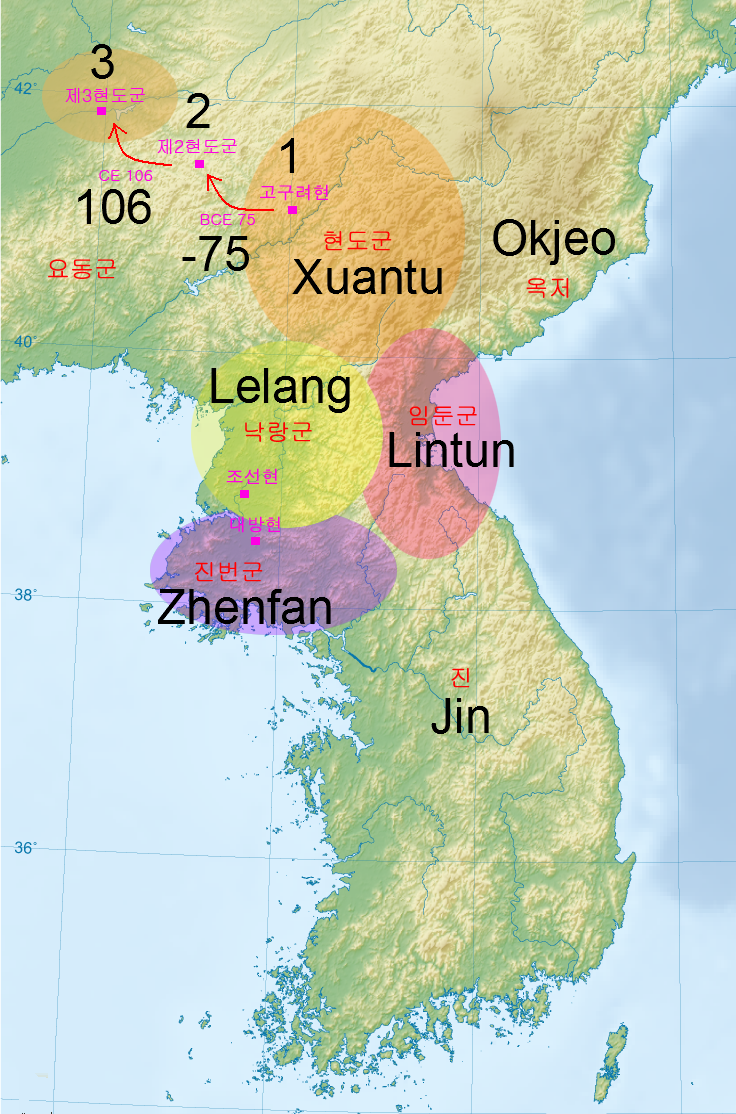
Han dynasty destroys Wiman Chosŏn, establishing Four Commanderies of Han in northern Korean Peninsula

The Han conquest of Old Chosŏn was a campaign launched by Emperor Wu of the Han dynasty against Wiman Chosŏn between 109 and 108 BCE. It resulted in the fall of Old Chosŏn and the establishment of the Four Commanderies of Han in the northern half of the Korean Peninsula.

== Background ==
Wi Man, or Wei Man (Chinese), was originally a general in the vassal kingdom of Yan under the rule of Lu Wan. In 195 BCE, Lu Wan was implicated in plotting rebellion against the Han dynasty, and Emperor Gaozu of Han sent an army against him. Yan was defeated, and Lu Wan fled to the Xiongnu, while Wi Man sought refuge in the eastern kingdom of Gojoseon. Wi Man and one thousand of his followers adopted the dress of the Koreans and little by little, he gained a large following of both native Koreans and Chinese refugees. He then usurped the throne of King Jun of Gojoseon, who fled south to Jin. The governor of Liaodong agreed to acknowledge Wi Man as a foreign vassal of Han so long as he guarded their border against barbarian intrusions, and to allow passage any barbarians who wished to pay their tributes to the Han emperor.

Wi Man's grandson, King Ugeo of Gojoseon, interrupted direct contact with envoys sent by various tribal chieftains on the Korean Peninsula to the Han court. In 109 BCE, Emperor Wu of Han dispatched She He (涉何) to rebuke King Ugeo. After an audience with the king, She He failed in securing safe passage for the envoys. On the return trip, She He killed Wi Jang (衛長降), an assistant who had been sent to escort him home. This angered King Ugeo, who sent troops into Han territory to kill She He. The direct pretext for war thus came when King Ugeo had the Han envoy executed, which angered Emperor Wu considerably.

The initiation of war may also have been brought by the desire to remove the possibility that Gojoseon would ally with the Xiongnu against the Han. Another reason may also have been the deteriorating relations between Han and Gojoseon, because Wiman Joseon had prevented trade between Han and polities such as Jinbeon (진번, 眞番).

== Course of the war ==
In 109 BCE, Emperor Wu launched a Han military campaign into Gojoseon. Yang Pu (楊浦) and Xun Zhi (尋知) respectively—set out from the Han empire to invade Gojoseon. Yang Pu's army of 50,000 sailed from Donglai Commandery (present-day Yantai, Shandong Province) across the Bohai Sea towards Gojoseon, while Xun Zhi marched by land through Liaodong and headed towards Wanggeom, the capital of Gojoseon.

One of Yang's commanders by the name of Duo took command of a large number of troops and lead them ahead as a vanguard force. He suffered a disastrous defeat. As a result, Yang Pu had only 7,000 men with him when they reached the capital of Gojoseon, Wanggeom-seong. Seeing how small the enemy army was, King Ugeo marched out, defeating and routing Yang Pu's army. Yang Pu spent the next ten days rounding up the remnants of his army, which had fled into the nearby mountains. Meanwhile, Xun Zhi failed to break Gojoseon's army west of the Yalu River.

When Emperor Wu received news of these defeats, he wished to reestablish peaceful relations between Han and Gojoseon. King Ugeo agreed, and to make amends, he sent his son and a gift of 5,000 horses to the Han court. When the prince and his escort of 10,000 soldiers reached the Yalu River, Xun Zhi reasoned that they should lay down arms. The prince suspected that Xun Zhi was planning on murdering him and so went back to Wanggeom-seong, resuming the war.

Xun Zhi attacked the Gojoseon army again and succeeded in defeating it this time. Xun Zhi and Yang Pu converged on Wanggeom-seong and laid siege to it, but the city was well guarded, and after several months it had still not fallen. After a sudden attack by Xun Zhi, the high minister of Gojoseon secretly sent envoys to discuss terms of surrender with Yang Pu, however no final agreement was reached. Xun Zhi wished to make an all out attack on the city but Yang Pu favored continued negotiations, therefore relations between the two generals began to strain. When Emperor Wu sent the governor of Jinan, Gongsun Sui, to straighten things out, Xun Zhi told him that Yang Pu was delaying the defeat of Gojoseon. Gongsun Sui agreed with him and used his imperial credentials to summon Yang Pu to Xun Zhi's camp. Once there, they arrested Yang Pu and took command of his army. Emperor Wu was displeased by this turn of events and sent orders for Gongsun Sui to be executed.

With both armies under his command, Xun Zhi made preparations for a final attack on Wanggeom. Officials such as No In, Han Eum, Sam of Gojoseon, Wang Gyeop insisted on surrendering to the Han, but King Ugeo disagreed. In April of 108 BCE, Wang Gyeop, No In, Han Eum, and Sam surrendered to the Han. Sam later sent assassins into Wanggeom-seong and killed King Ugeo. Wanggeom-seong still struggled on under the leadership of Minister Seong Gi (成基) but Seong Gi was also assassinated. Eventually, the people of Wanggeom-seong were convinced to surrender by the sons of King Ugeo and No In. In 108 BCE, all of Gojoseon had fallen and was conquered by the Han.

== Aftermath ==
After the conquest of Gojoseon, four Han commanderies were created to administer the conquered territories. These were Lelang, Xuantu, Zhenfan, and Lintun. The most significant commandery was located in Lelang (near present-day Pyongyang), which controlled the region until 313 AD. The conquest of Gojoseon in 108 BCE by Han ultimately led to the Proto-Three Kingdoms period of Korea.

While the surrendered nobles and ministers of Gojoseon were enfeoffed as marquises, Xun Zhi was arrested upon returning home and executed for jealousy and betrayal of strategy. Yang Pu was also sentenced to execution for his subordinate's defeat, but on payment of a fine he was allowed to become a commoner.

== See also ==
- Gojoseon–Yan War

== Bibliography ==
- Matray, James Irving (2005). Korea divided: The thirty-eighth parallel and the Demilitarized Zone. Philadelphia: Chelsea House Publishers. ISBN 978-0-7910-7829-7.
- Pai, Hyung Il (1992). "Culture contact and culture change: The Korean Peninsula and its relations with the Han Dynasty commandery of Lelang". World Archaeology. 23 (3): 306–319. doi:10.1080/00438243.1992.9980182. JSTOR 124765.
- Pai, Hyung Il (2000). Constructing "Korean" origins: A critical review of archaeology, historiography, and racial myth in Korean state-formation theories. Cambridge: Harvard University Asia Center. ISBN 978-0-674-00244-9.
- Shim, Jae-Hoon (2002). "A new understanding of Kija Chosŏn as a historical anachronism". Harvard Journal of Asiatic Studies. 62 (2): 271–305. doi:10.2307/4126600. JSTOR 4126600.
- Shin, Hyŏng-sik (2006). A brief history of Korea (2nd print ed.). Seoul: Ewha Womans University Press. ISBN 978-89-7300-619-9.
- Watson, Burton (1993), Records of the Grand Historian by Sima Qian: Han Dynasty II (Revised Edition, Columbia University Press
- West, Barbara A. (2009). Encyclopedia of the peoples of Asia and Oceania. New York: Infobase Publishing. ISBN 978-0-8160-7109-8.
