= Noriko Mizuta =

Japanese academic

- Born: August 19, 1937 (age 89)
- Occupation: Educational administrator

Noriko Mizuta (水田 宗子, Mizuta Noriko; born August 19, 1937) is a scholar of comparative literature and a poet. She is the trustee of Jōsai University Educational Corporation in Japan. She was awarded the Pro Cultura Hungarica prize in 2011 and the Commander’s Cross of the Order of Merit of Hungary (civil division) in 2013.

== Early life and education ==
Mizuta graduated from Tokyo Woman's Christian University with a degree in English Literature. She earned a Ph.D. from Yale University in American studies.

== Career ==
In 1970, Mizuta became an instructor of modern American and British literature and critical theory at Marymount University and Scripps College. In 1974 she became an associate professor at the University of Southern California, teaching comparative literature, American literature, and feminist theory.

In 1986 Mizuta was the first director of the new International Education Center at Josai University. She taught as a professor at the university and then served as President from 1994-1996. She served as President of Josai International University from 1996 until 2009, and as Chancellor of Josai Education University from 2004 until 2016.

Mizuta is editor-in-chief of the Review of Japanese Culture and Society.

== English language publications ==
- Japanese Women Writers: Twentieth Century Short Fiction, as Noriko Mizuta Lippit, co-edited with Kyoko Iriye Selden (1991).
- More Stories by Japanese Women Writers: An Anthology, co-edited with Kyoko Selden (2011).

== Japanese publications ==
- Edogaa aran poo no sekai: tsumi to yume, エドガー・アラン・ポオの世界 罪と夢, 1982
- Hiroin kara hiiroo he: josei no jiga to hyougen, ヒロインからヒーローへ：女性の自我と表現, 1982
- Modanizumu to "sengo josei shi", モダニズムと〈戦後女性詩〉の展開, 2012

== Poetry anthologies (Japanese) ==
Mizuta was awarded the Cikada Prize in Poetry in honor of Nobel Laureate Harry Martinson in 2013. The main anthologies of her poetry include the following.

- The Road Home (帰路), Shichosha, 2008. Poetry. ISBN 978-4783730705 .
- Summer Vacation in Santa Barbara (サンタバーバラの夏休み), Shichosha 2010. Poetry. ISBN 978-4783731894
- A Wedding in Amsterdam (アムステルダムの結婚式), Shichosha, 2013. Poetry. Illustrations by Mori Yoko. ISBN 978-4783733461
- Sea of Blue Algae (青い藻の海), Shichosha, 2013. Poetry. ISBN 978-4783733966
- Tokyo Sabbath (東京のサバス), Shichosha, 2015. Poetry. ISBN 978-4783734697

== Poetry anthologies (English) ==
- Sea of Blue Algae ISBN 978-4907630539. Translation and introduction by Jordan A. Y. Smith. Josai University Press, 2016.
- Poem in Blue ISBN 978-9629967284. English translation by Jordan A. Y. Smith. International Poets in Hong Kong Series, Chinese University Press, 2016.
- The Road Home ISBN 978-4907630522. Translation and introduction by Jordan A. Y. Smith. Josai University Press, 2015. (Five poems from this collection were also published online at Poetry Kanto.)
