= Kyoko Iriye Selden =

Japanese scholar (1936–2013)

Selden (c. 1975)

Kyoko Iriye Selden (Japanese: 入江 恭子; 1936–2013) was a Japanese scholar of Japanese language and literature and a translator.

== Biography ==
Kyoko Iriye was born in Tokyo. Her father was a journalist reporting from Paris and Shanghai, and her mother was an English teacher. Historian Akira Iriye is her older brother. She attended Seikei High School, and wrote a thesis on Wordsworth at the University of Tokyo, before studying English Literature on a Fulbright Scholarship at Yale University. She taught at Cornell University for twenty-five years, and was a literary translator. She was married to Mark Selden, with whom she had three children and four grandchildren.

== The Kyoko Iriye Selden Memorial Translation Prize ==
Also known as the Kyoko Selden Translation Prize, it was awarded eight times between 2014 and 2022, with contributions from colleagues and friends, to honor Kyoko Iriye Selden's scholarly legacy. The prize was awarded to translations that were at the unpublished stage, to support and encourage translation and publication of Japanese language materials across a broad range. In 2022, the Department of Asian Studies at Cornell University announced that the prize would be awarded for the last time.

2022 Winners

- Record of a Journey that Was More than Mere Diversion” (Kishikairoku) by Hayashi Kakuryō (1806-1878) - translated by Matthew Fraleigh
- Faithful Birds of Sorrow (Utō yasukata chūgiden, 1806) by Santō Kyōden (1761-1816) - translated by Yi Deng (Colombia University)
- Honorable Mention: Letters from Iwaki, 2012-2014 (Iwaki Tsūshin 2012-2014), by Yoshida Hiromi - translated by Shi-Lin Loh

2021 Winners

- Excerpts from Shōkenkō 蕉堅稿: The Selected Poems of Zekkai Chūshin 絶海中津 (1336-1405), by Zekkai Chūshin (1336-1405) - translated by Paul Atkins
- "A Dosimeter on the Narrow Road to Oku" (線量計と奥の細道, 2018), by Durian Sukegawa (ドリアン助川) - translated by Alison Watts

2020 Competition cancelled due to COVID-19
2019 Winner

- "The Maiden's Betrayal" (Otome no mikkoku, 2010), Akiko Akazome - translated by Michelle Kyoko Crowson

2018 Winners

- "A Famous Flower in Mountain Seclusion" (Sankan no meika, 1889), by Nakajima Shōen - translated by Dawn Lawson
- "An Artificial Heart" (Jinkō Shinzō, 1926), by Kosakai Fuboku - translated by Max Zimmerman
- Honorable Mention: Chapter Four of Ishimure Michiko's historical novel about the Shimabara Rebellion, Birds of Spirit (Anima no tori, 1999) - translated by Bruce Allen

2017 Winners

- "Tale of the Enchanted Sword" (妖剣記聞, Yōken Kibun, 1920), by Izumi Kyōka - translated by Nina Cornyetz
- "The Torrent" (奔流, Hon’ryū, 1943), by Taiwanese writer Wang Changxiong (王昶雄, also known by his Japanese name, Ō Chōyū) - translated by Erin Brightwell

2016 Winner

- "Not of Color" (Hishoku), by Ariyoshi Sawako - translated by Polly Barton

2015 Winner

- "Muddy River" (Doro no kawa), by Miyamoto Teru - translated by Andrew Murakami-Smith

2014 Winners

- "Sagoromo" (Sagoromo monogatari), by Rokujo no Saiin Senji (1039-1036) - translated by David Pearsall Dutcher
- "So Happy to See Cherry Blossoms" (Mankai no sakura ga mirete ureshii na, 2012), by Madoka Mayuzumi - translated by Hiroaki Sato and Nancy Sato

== Selected publications ==
Translations into English of Fiction, History, Biography, Early Childhood Education, and Art

- Kodaira Takashi (ed.), Tenrō haiku no eiyaku: Seishi, Toshio, Ayako (Haiku from the Tenrō School in English Translation: Seishi, Toshio, Ayako) (Yokohama: Shumpūsha, 2014) - translated by Alfred H. Marks and Kyoko Selden.
- Suzuki Shin’ichi, Nurtured by Love. Revised edition (Van Nuys, CA: Alfred Music Publishing, 2013) - translated by Kyoko Selden with Lili Selden
- Cho Kyo, The Search for the Beautiful Woman: A Cultural History of Japanese and Chinese Beauty (Lanham, MD: Rowman & Littlefield, 2012)
- Tanaka Shigeki, Everything Depends on How We Raise Them: Educating Young Children by the Suzuki Method (Miami: Summy-Birchard, 2002)
- Honda Katsuichi, Harukor: An Ainu Woman’s Tale (Berkeley: University of California Press, 2000).
- Tomioka Taeko, The Funeral of a Giraffe: Seven Stories of Tomioka Taeko (Armonk, NY: M. E. Sharpe, 1999) - translated by Kyoko Selden and Noriko Mizuta.
- Kayano Shigeru, Our Land Was a Forest: An Ainu Memoir (Boulder, CO: Westview Press, [1994] 1996) - translated by Kyoko Selden and Lili Selden.
- Suzuki Shin’ichi, Young Children’s Talent Education and Its Method (Miami: SummyBirchard, 1996)
- Selden, Kyoko and Noriko Mizuta (eds), Japanese Women Writers: Twentieth Century Short Fiction (Armonk, NY: M.E. Sharpe [1982] 1991) - edited and translated with Noriko Mizuta.
- Selden, Mark and Kyoko Selden (eds), The Atomic Bomb: Voices from Hiroshima and Nagasaki (Armonk, NY: M. E. Sharpe, 1989)
- Shimizu Yoshiaki (ed.), Japan: The Shaping of Daimyo Culture, 1185-1868 (Washington, D.C.: National Gallery of Art, Washington, 1989.
- Suzuki Shin’ichi. Talent Education for Young Children. New Albany, IN: World-Wide Press, 1986)
- Honda Masaaki, Shinichi Suzuki: Man of Love (Princeton: Birch Tree Group, 1984)
- Suzuki Shin’ichi, Where Love Is Deep: The Writing of Shin’ichi Suzuki (New Albany, IN: World-Wide Press, 1982)
