= National Institute of Korean History =

South Korean government agency

Agency overview
- Formed: March 1946
- Preceding agency: Office of National History
- Jurisdiction: Government of South Korea
- Headquarters: Gwacheon, Gyeonggi Province, South Korea
- Parent agency: Ministry of Education
- Website: www.history.go.kr

Korean name
- Hangul: 국사편찬위원회
- Hanja: 國史編纂委員會
- RR: Guksa pyeonchan wiwonhoe
- MR: Kuksa p'yŏnch'an wiwŏnhoe

The National Institute of Korean History (NIKH; Korean: 국사편찬위원회) is a South Korean government organization in charge of researching, collecting, compiling, and promoting materials related to Korean history. It was established as the Office of National History (국사관; 國史館; Guksagwan) in March 1946, one year after the liberation of Korea. It changed its name to the current form in 1949.

== Description ==
It is located in Gwacheon, Gyeonggi Province.

As a branch of the Ministry of Education, the NIKH certifies and supervises drafts of history textbooks used in middle and high schools. It conducts educational programs for government officials and teachers of elementary, middle, and high schools. It also operates a school to train competent translators of historical documents written in classical Chinese and pre-modern Japanese. The NIKH holds and supervises the Korean History Proficiency Test four times a year, and sponsors the annual Korean History Competition among middle and high school students.

The NIKH has established a systematic database and internet service network for the purpose of facilitating the investigation, collection, exhibition, and release of historical materials in cooperation with related institutions. The Korean history database provides original text of important historical materials, which are digitalized in a chronological order so that the public can search out the needed information. For the purpose of promoting the popularization of history, the NIKH has developed other websites, including Historynet and Korean History On-line.

== History ==
In January 2012, the NIKH announced that they will translate the Annals of the Joseon Dynasty into English by the year 2033. With an initial budget of ₩500 million, they planned to start work in 2014 but estimated that a budget of ₩40 billion is needed to complete the project. It is a Korean historical informatization project that provides the public with search access to the Annals of the Joseon Dynasty and the Seungjeongwon Diary.

=== Textbook controversy ===
Starting in 2015, two emeritus professors of history served as lead authors of state-compiled history textbooks which were used at secondary schools starting in 2017. The two professors include Choi Mong-ryong who led the writing on Korean archeology, and Shin Hyung-sik who led the writing on ancient Korean history. Lead writers who are top-class scholars in their respective fields were selected for other eras as well. In total the project consisted of a 36-member team. In addition, history teachers participated as advisers and wrote some parts as necessary. After writing was completed, a review team of experts specializing in each historical era examined the content, and other historical agencies edited the content as necessary. In the past, schools selected from history textbooks written by eight private publishers who were approved by the government. The government pushed ahead the plan to adopt the single state-authored textbooks, suggesting the old ones were too left-leaning with pro-North Korean descriptions.

Many others claimed this project will monopolize the textbooks and throw the nation into an ideological war over how students should learn modern history. The decision drew fierce protests from opposition political parties, historians and educators. Education Minister Hwang Woo-yea pledged that the ministry will ensure diverse views are included in the new textbooks, saying that experts from many different backgrounds will participate in producing it. But as most liberal historians refused to be part of the projects, the prospect of fulfilling his promise was not bright. Approximately 60,000 people, including superintendents of regional education offices, professors and middle and high school teachers, had signed a petition against the plan. These people said that the government needs to give more – not less – freedom to textbook producers in terms of determining what content should be included in books. Only a handful of countries in the world use state-approved history textbooks, among them are North Korean and Vietnam.

In November 2016, a draft version of three textbooks for middle and high school student were unveiled. These books were called the "Correct History Textbook" and were designed to assert the country's legitimacy and remove political bias. Civic groups heavily criticized the textbooks for beautifying dictators, and some stated they will not recognize it as an official textbook.

== See also ==
- History of Korea
- Korean History Compilation Committee
