= Chuokoron-Shinsha =

Japanese publisher

Chuokoron-Shinsha, Inc.
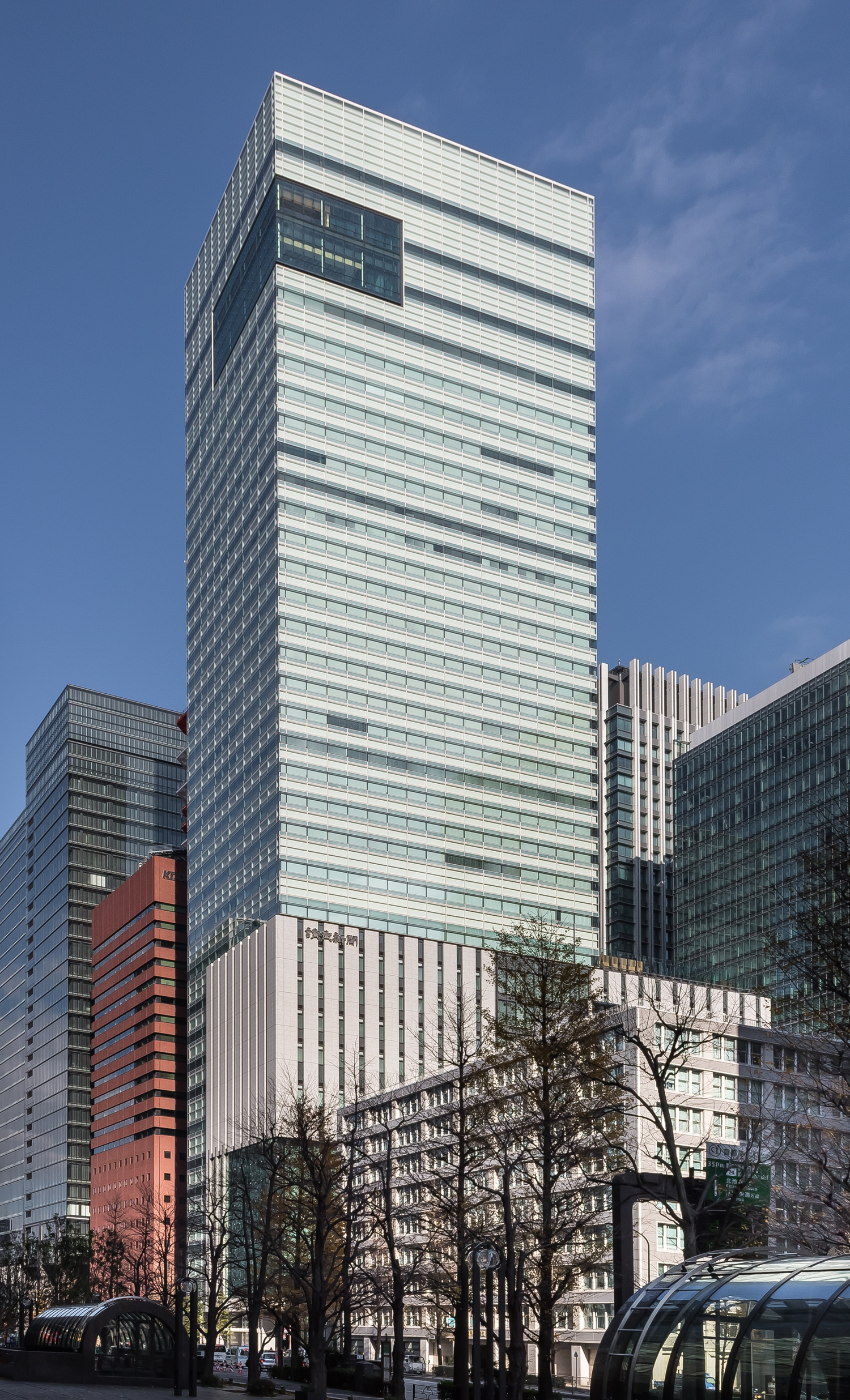
- Headquarters in Chiyoda, Tokyo
- Native name: 株式会社中央公論新社
- Romanized name: Kabushiki-gaisha Chūōkōron-shinsha
- Type: Subsidiary
- Industry: Publishing
- Founded: 1886; 140 years ago
- Headquarters: Ōtemachi, Chiyoda, Tokyo, Japan
- Key people: Junichi Abe (president and CEO)
- Products: Novels, books, manga and magazines
- Owner: The Yomiuri Shimbun Holdings
- Number of employees: 151(as of December 2023)
- Website: https://www.chuko.co.jp/

Chuokoron-Shinsha, Inc. (Japanese: 株式会社中央公論新社, Hepburn: Kabushiki-gaisha Chūōkōron-shinsha) is a Japanese publisher. It was established in 1886, under the name Kabushiki-Gaisha Chūōkōron-Sha (株式会社中央公論). In 1999, it was acquired by Yomiuri Shimbun Holdings, and its name was subsequently changed.

== Profile ==
The company publishes a wide variety of material, including numerous novels, books, manga and several magazines, including the famous literary magazine Chūō Kōron (中央公論) and Fujin Kōron (婦人公論). It also organizes a variety of prestigious literary awards and prizes across Japan, such as the renowned Chūōkōron Prize.

Among the numerous novels published by the company include Hiroshi Mori's The Sky Crawler series, which was adapted into a 2008 anime film from director Mamoru Oshii.

The company has also published numerous manga, including Keiji Nakazawa's famed Barefoot Gen series, Monkey Punch's famed Lupin III series, Keiko Takemiya's Hensōkyoku, Riyoko Ikeda's noted works The Rose of Versailles, Jotei Ekaterina and Ten no Hate Made: Poland Hishi, Kaoru Kurimoto and Yumiko Igarashi's The Sword of Paros, Go Nagai's Violence Jack, Yoshikazu Yasuhiko's Waga na wa Nero, and numerous others.
