= Gaogouli County =

Han dynasty county in southern Manchuria and northern Korea

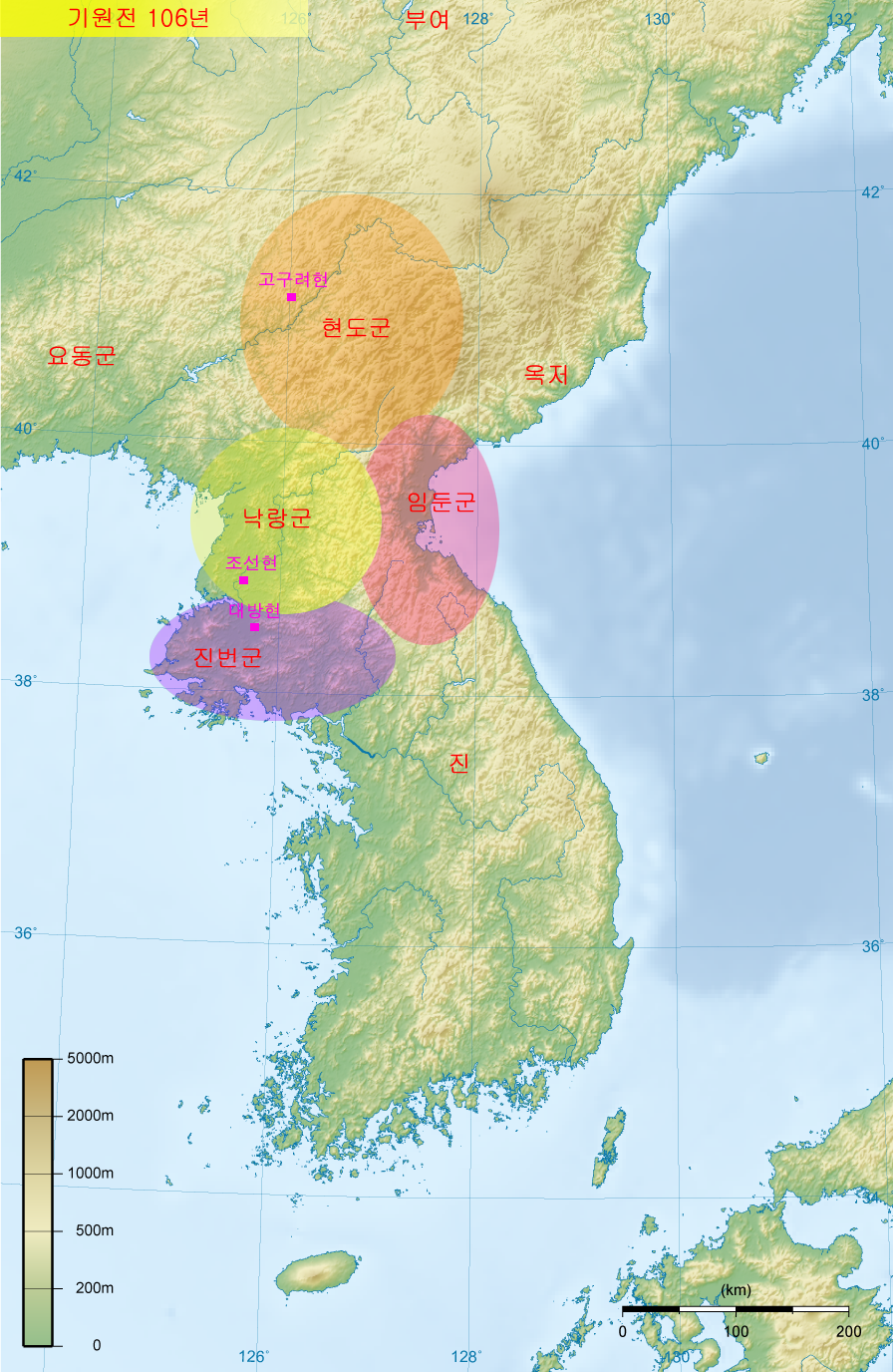
- The Four Commanderies of Han, with Xuantu Commandery shown in orange
- Traditional Chinese: 高句麗縣
- Simplified Chinese: 高句丽县
Transcriptions
Standard Mandarin
- Hanyu Pinyin: Gāogòulì Xiàn

Alternative Chinese name
- Traditional Chinese: 高句骊縣
- Simplified Chinese: 高句骊县
Transcriptions
Standard Mandarin
- Hanyu Pinyin: Gāogòulí Xiàn

Gaogouli County (Chinese: 高句驪縣; Goguryeo County or Koguryo County Korean: 고구려현) was a county of the Chinese Han dynasty under the administration of Xuantu Commandery located in southern Manchuria and the northern Korean Peninsula. It was established by the Han dynasty after its conquest of Gojoseon to keep the tribes of Goguryeo in check. In 12 AD, Goguryeo rebelled against the Han dynasty and established its own kingdom, and in 105 AD, began attacking the Chinese commanderies of Xuantu and Liaodong.

According to Han W.K., the Goguryeo were responsible for the fall of an earlier "Chinese colony" in 128 BC and that Goguryeo was responsible for the fall of the first Xuantu commandery in 75 BC. According to Gardiner, from 75 BC to 12 AD, the Goguryeo people were under administration of Gaogouli County and were clients of the Han dynasty that were recruited to fight the steppe nomads.

In 12 AD, Koguryō attack the county seat and broke away from the influence of the Xuantu Commandery. During the reign of Wang Mang, a "Marquis Zou of Koguryō" was executed for refusing to send forces to fight against the Xiongnu. The policies of Wang Mang caused Goguryeo people and other ethnic groups to resist their influence. Appeasement by the Eastern Han dynasty caused the "King of Goguryeo", also known as the "king for the first time", to send envoys and tribute in 32 AD. The Marquis of Goguryeo was a relatively independent authority within the territory of Xuantu and occupied a similar rank to a county magistrate. According to the Book of Later Han, the Marquis of Goguryeo held the title of king before Wang Mang downgraded it to marquis and then restored it again in 32 AD. However this may be due to the time period when the Book of Later Han was compiled during the 5th century AD, a time when there were many "barbarian" kings. It is uncertain when the title of King of Goguryeo appeared, but some scholars believe that Goguryeo emerged as a coherent entity by 12 AD when they attacked the Han dynasty. By the mid-1st century AD, Goguryeo was demanding tribute from noble Goguryeo tribes in northeastern Korea.

Later, in the 4th century, the State of Goguryeo conquered Xuantu Commandery, along with the Liaodong and Lelang commanderies, ending Han rule over the Liaodong Peninsula and the Korean Peninsula.
