= Four Commanderies of Han =

Chinese commanderies set up to control the populace in the former Gojoseon area

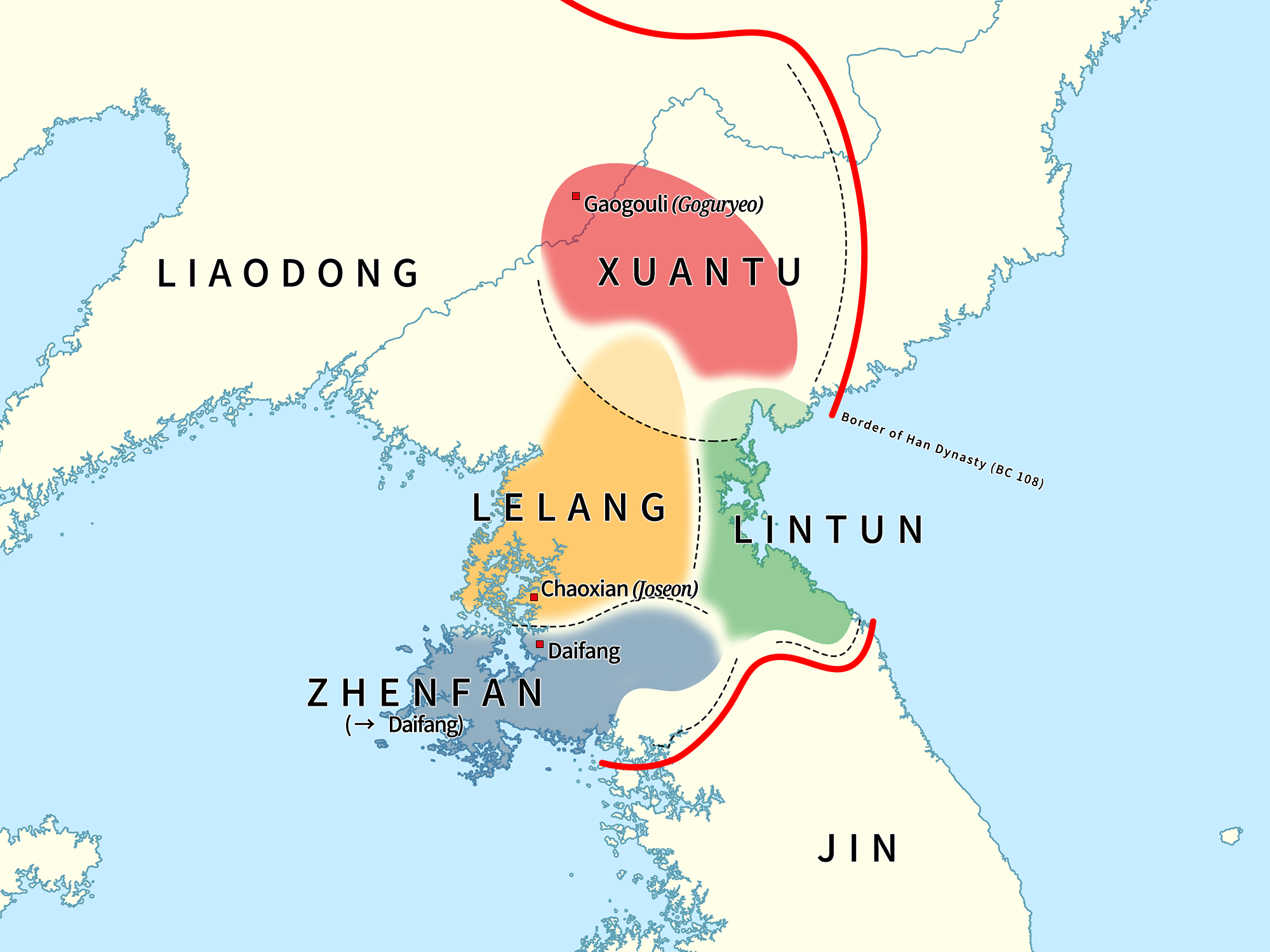
Four Commanderies of Han in 108 BC

The Four Commanderies of Han (Chinese: 漢四郡; pinyin: Hàn-sìjùn; Korean: 한사군; Hanja: 漢四郡; RR: Han-sagun) were Chinese commanderies located in the north of the Korean Peninsula and part of the Liaodong Peninsula from around the end of the second century BCE through the early 4th CE, for the longest lasting. The commanderies were set up to control the populace in the former areas of Old Chosŏn (Gojoseon) as far south as the Han River, with a core area at Lelang near present-day Pyongyang by Emperor Wu of the Han dynasty in early 2nd century BCE after his conquest of Wiman Chosŏn. As such, these commanderies are seen as Chinese colonies by some scholars. Though disputed by North Korean scholars, Western sources generally describe the Lelang Commandery as existing within the Korean peninsula, and extend the rule of the four commanderies as far south as the Han River. However, South Korean scholars assumed its administrative areas to Pyongan and Hwanghae provinces.

Three of the commanderies fell or retreated westward within a few decades, but the Lelang Commandery remained as a center of cultural and economic exchange with successive Chinese dynasties for four centuries. At its administrative center in Lelang, the Chinese built what was in essence a Chinese city where the governor, officials, and merchants, and Chinese colonists lived. Their administration had considerable impact on the life of the native population and ultimately the very fabric of Old Chosŏn society became eroded. Later, Goguryeo, founded in 37 BCE, began conquering the commanderies and eventually absorbed them into its own territory by the early 4th century CE.

== Commanderies ==
=== Precedents ===
Before the fall of Old Chosŏn, a single commandery, called Canghai Commandery, covered an area in northern Korean Peninsula to southern Manchuria. Nan Lü (Hanja: 南閭), who was a monarch of Dongye and a subject of Wiman Chosŏn, revolted against Ugeo of Gojoseon and then surrendered to the Han dynasty with 280,000 people. (Note: Book of the Later Han, Treatise on the Dongyi (元朔元年武帝年也. 濊君南閭等【集解】 惠棟曰, 顏籀云, 南閭者, 薉君之名.畔右渠, 率二十八萬口詣遼東內屬, 武帝以其地爲蒼海郡, 數年乃罷.)) The commandery was established following this revolt, however in two years, it was abolished by Gongsun Hong.

=== Four commanderies ===
- Lelang Commandery (樂浪郡, 낙랑군/락랑군, 108 BCE–313 CE): 25 prefectures, 62,812 households, population of 406,748 in 2 CE.
- Lintun Commandery (臨屯郡, 임둔군, 107–82 BCE): absorbed into Xuantu.
- Xuantu Commandery (玄菟郡, 현도군, 107 BCE–319 CE): 3 prefectures, 45,006 households, population of 221,845 in 2 CE.
- Zhenfan Commandery (眞番郡, 진번군, 107–82 BCE): absorbed into Lelang.

=== Daifang Commandery ===
A commandery that was separated out of Lelang Commandery in the later years of its history was named the Daifang Commandery (帶方郡, 대방군, 204–220/210–315 CE).

- Other descriptions: the Tongdian, the Records of Three Kingdoms, the Book of Later Han

== History ==
=== Han dynasty ===
When Old Chosŏn was defeated in 108 BCE, three commanderies were established in its place: Lelang, Lintun, and Zhenfan. In 107 BCE, Xuantu Commandery was also established in the place of Gojoseon's ally, Yemaek. In 82 BCE, Lintun was absorbed into Xuantu and Zhenfan absorbed into Lelang. In 75 BCE, Xuantu moved its capital to Liaodong due to resistance from the native people. Lintun was transferred to Lelang.

Although often depicted as special administrative units within the Han dynasty, excavated records suggest that these commanderies were governed no differently than those in the core regions of the Han. Neighboring Korean powers such as the Jinhan confederacy and Byeonhan confederacy imported goods from Lelang such as mirrors. As the natives started to adopt the culture of the Han dynasty, a hybrid of different cultures that was unique to Lelang developed in the 1st and 2nd centuries CE.

=== Gongsun Du, Kang, Gong, and Yuan ===
Gongsun Du was born in Xiangping (Liaoyang, Liaoning). In his early years, Du's father fled to Xuantu Commandery, where Du became an office runner. Du attracted the support of the governor Gongsun Yu, whose daughter he eventually married. He rose up the ranks of officialdom in Ji Province until he became regional inspector.

Gongsun Du was appointed Administrator of Liaodong Commandery by Dong Zhuo in 189 on the recommendation of Xu Rong. As a result of his lowly origins, Du harbored an intense hatred for the elite landowning class. Once he became administrator, Du carried out his vendetta against the wealthy by publicly flogging to death the Magistrate of Xiangping and extirpating the gentry. Du dominated the northeast and expanded into the territory of Goguryeo and the Wuhuan. When Cao Cao attempted to bestow titles upon Du, he rejected them and proclaimed himself king. Du died in 204 and was succeeded by his son, Gongsun Kang. In 204 Kang expanded into Goguryeo and created Daifang Commandery. When the Wuhuan were defeated by Cao Cao in 207, Yuan Shang, Yuan Xi, and the Wuhuan leaders Louban and Supuyan fled to Kang. Kang killed them and sent their heads to Cao Cao.

In 208, Kang sent aid to Balgi in support of his claim to the Goguryeo throne. According to the 12th century chronicle Samguk Sagi, the invasion was defeated by Gyesu, younger brother of Sansang of Goguryeo. However this is not reported in the Chinese records, which state that the invasion was a success and Balgi was settled in conquered territory. K.H.J. Gardiner says that this is because the Samguk Sagi sought to reverse the reality of defeat in a number of instances and questioned both the existence of Gyesu and his victory. Gongsun Kang took some territory in 209 and Goguryeo was forced to move its capital further east to the Yalu rivery valley near Hwando. Kang died in 220 when his children were too young to rule, so his brother Gongsun Gong succeeded him. Gong maintained his independence, albeit while accepting titles issued by Cao Pi. Gong became ill and was replaced by his nephew Gongsun Yuan in 228. Yuan ruled independently until Sima Yi invaded in 238 and annexed his territory.

Goguryeo re-established in its former territory and established dominance over the tribes at the mouth of the Yalu River sometime before 233. In 238, Goguryeo allied with Cao Wei to overthrow the Liaodong regime.

=== Cao Wei, Jin, and Xianbei ===
Goguryeo raided the Xuantu Commandery in 242. In retaliation, Cao Wei invaded Goguryeo from 244 to 245. The Wei general Guanqiu Jian sacked the Goguryeo capital of Hwando, sent its king fleeing, and broke the tributary relationships between Goguryeo and the other tribes of Korea that formed much of Goguryeo's economy. Although the king evaded capture and eventually settled in a new capital, Goguryeo was reduced to such insignificance that for half a century there was no mention of the state in Chinese historical texts.

Afterwards, the Lelang, Daifang, and Xuantu commanderies were ruled by Cao Wei, the Jin dynasty, and the Murong Xianbei until they were conquered by Goguryeo in the early 300s.

=== Goguryeo ===
Lelang Commandery was ruled by the Jin dynasty (266–420) until 313. Due to civil war, the Jin dynasty was unable to send officials to govern its territory in northern Korea. The leaders of Liaodong and Lelang led over one thousand households to break away from Jin and submitted to the Xianbei warlord of Former Yan Murong Hui. Murong Hui relocated the remnants of the commandery to the west within Liaodong. Goguryeo attacked and annexed the commandery in 313. Daifang was conquered in 314-315 and Xuantu in 319. After the collapse of the Han commanderies, Goguryeo accepted émigrés of Chinese origin to strengthen their control over the region.

K.H.J. Gardiner argues that even though the commanderies had been conquered by Goguryeo, it did not rule Lelang directly until after the death of Dong Shou in 357. Dong Shou was a general from Former Yan who fled to Goguryeo in 336 and was given a position in the former territory of Lelang.

== Revisionism ==
=== Joseon ===
Following the Qing invasion of Joseon (1636-1637), Hyojong of Joseon lived as a hostage for seven years in Mukden (Shenyang). He planned an invasion of the Qing dynasty called Bukbeol (Korean: 북벌; Hanja: 北伐; lit. 'northern expedition') during his ten years on the Joseon throne, though the plan died with his death on the eve of the expedition. The northern expedition spurred a rising concern with the northern territory among Joseon literati. The location of the Four Commanderies of Han became politicized and was tied to support for or against the northern expedition. Scholars who argued against the northern expedition situated all Four Commanderies within the Korean Peninsula while those who argued for the expedition situated them outside the peninsula but still within the former territory of Old Chosŏn. This framework of the Four Commanderies as both outside the Korean Peninsula but within Old Chosŏn's former territory lent support to a possible invasion of Manchuria and Liaodong (Yodong) by justifying it as recovering the lost lands of Old Chosŏn. A nostalgia grew for these lands covering Manchuria and Liaodong as part of Old Chosŏn.

=== Modern ===
In the North Korean academic community and some parts of the South Korean academic community, the Han dynasty's annexation of parts of the Korean peninsula have been denied. Proponents of this revisionist theory claim that the Han Commanderies (and Old Chosŏn) actually existed outside of the Korean peninsula, and place them somewhere in Liaodong Peninsula, in modern-day China, instead.

The stigmatization of colonial Japanese historical and archaeological findings in Korea as imperialist forgeries owes in part to those scholars' discovery and promotion of the Lelang Commandery—by which the Han dynasty administered territory near Pyongyang—and insistence that this Chinese commandery had an impact on the development of Korean civilization. Until the North Korean challenge, it was universally accepted that Lelang was a commandery established by Emperor Wu of Han after he defeated Gojoseon in 108 BCE. To deal with the Han Dynasty archeological remnants such as tombs, jewelry and laquerware North Korean scholars have reinterpreted them as the remains of Old Chosŏn or Goguryeo. For those artifacts, whose artistic style is undeniably originating in Han China and contrasts the previous Old Chosŏn Bronze dagger culture, they propose that they were introduced through trade and international contact, or were forgeries, and "should not by any means be construed as a basis to deny the Korean characteristics of the artifacts". The North Koreans also say that there were two Lelangs, and that the Han actually administered a Lelang on the Liao River on the Liaodong Peninsula, while Pyongyang was ruled by an "independent Korean state" called Nangnang, which existed between the 2nd century BCE until the 3rd century CE. The traditional view of Lelang, according to them, was expanded by Chinese chauvinists and Japanese imperialists.

While promoted by the academic community of North Korea, and supported by certain writers and historians in South Korea, this theory is not recognized in the mainstream academic circles of South Korea, the United States, China, and Japan. Most Korean scholars in the Goryeo and Joseon dynasties considered the location of Lelang county somewhere around today's Pyongyang area based on the Korean history record Samguk Yusa. There were also scholars who believe that Lelang was in Liaodong, such as Pak Chiwŏn, a Joseon dynasty silhak scholar who had conducted field research in Manchuria during his visit to Qing in 1780. Pak claimed that the location of commandries were actually in the Liaodong area in The Jehol Diary. Ri Ji Rin (Lee Ji Rin), a respected North Korean historian who obtained his Ph.D. in history from China's top university Peking University in 1961, in his published Research on Ancient Korea suggests that based on the initial records of Chinese texts and archaeological findings in Liaodong, the Han commanderies were located in Liaodong Peninsula. Another historian from South Korea, Yoon Nae-hyun also published a similar research in 1987, suggesting the Han commanderies were not in Korean peninsula.

In 2016, Harvard University's Early Korea Project lost its funding following political pressure from the South Korean culture minister nominee Do Jong-hwan and several other lawmakers. The incident was triggered by Harvard historian Mark Byington's argument that Lelang Commandery was located in Pyongyang. Byington noted that pseudohistorians enjoyed open government support during Do's term as culture minister.

== Maps ==
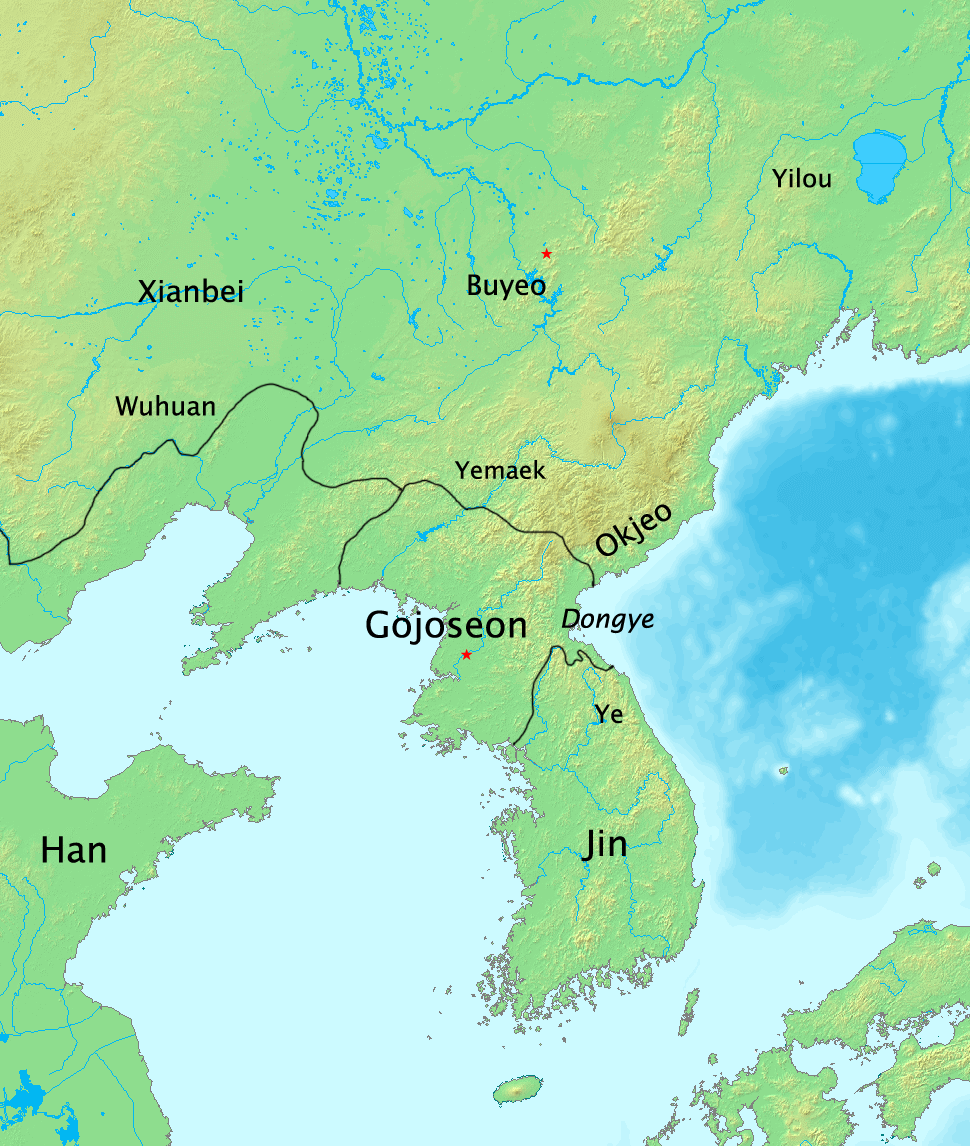
Korea prior to 108 BCE. Wiman Chosŏn before it was destroyed by the Han dynasty

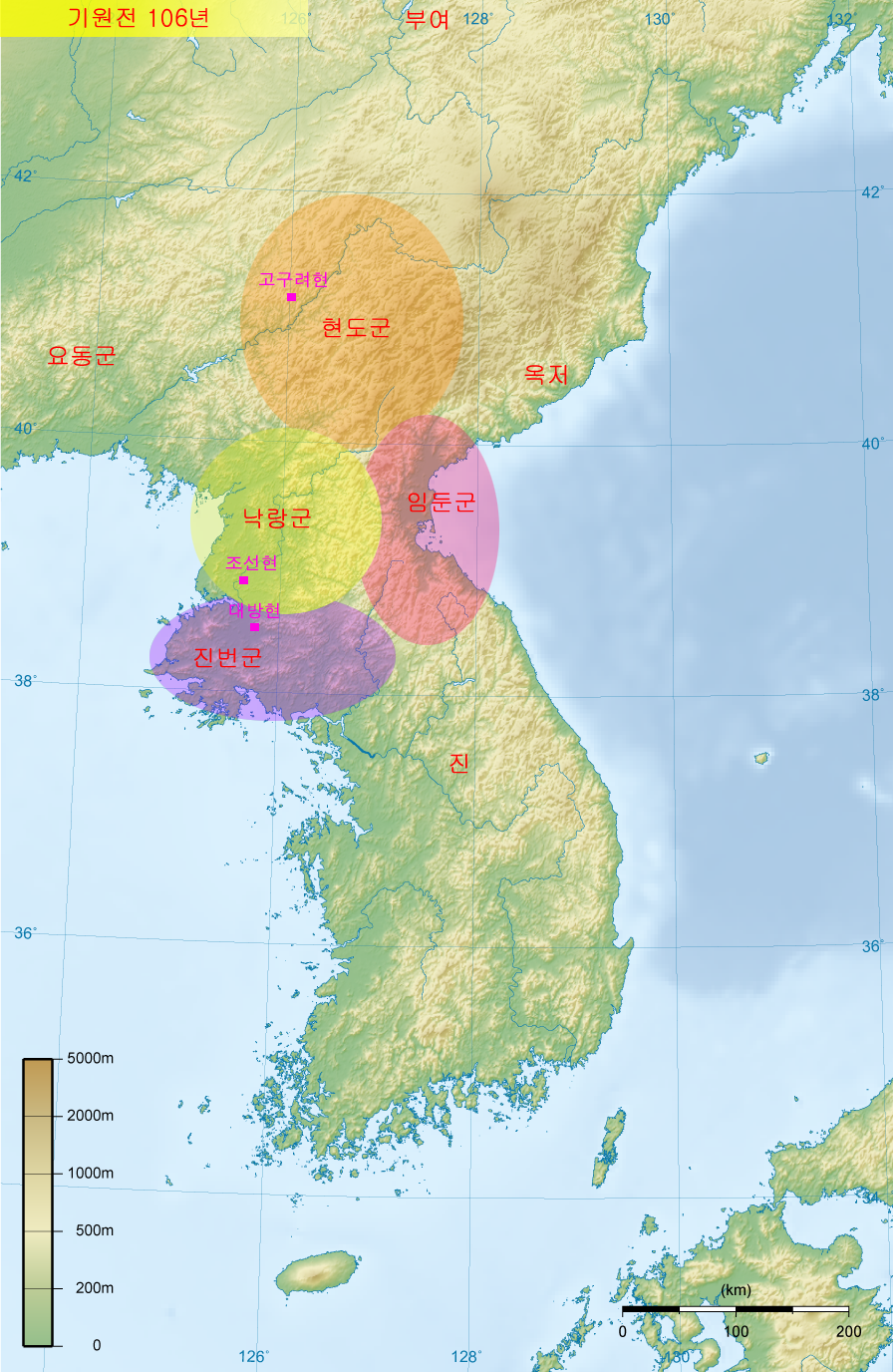
Han dynasty destroys Wiman Chosŏn in 108 BCE and establishes the Four Commanderies.

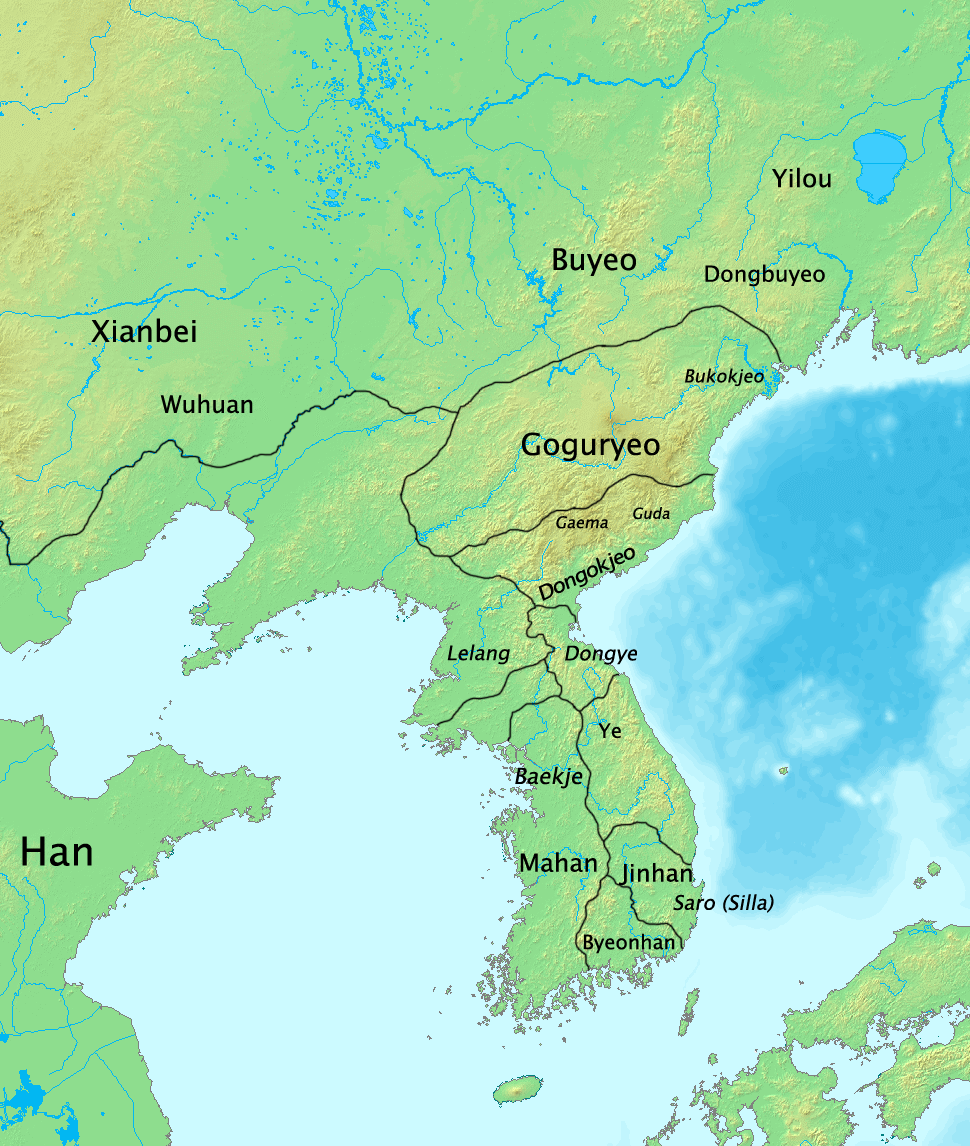
Four Commanderies of Han in 1st century CE

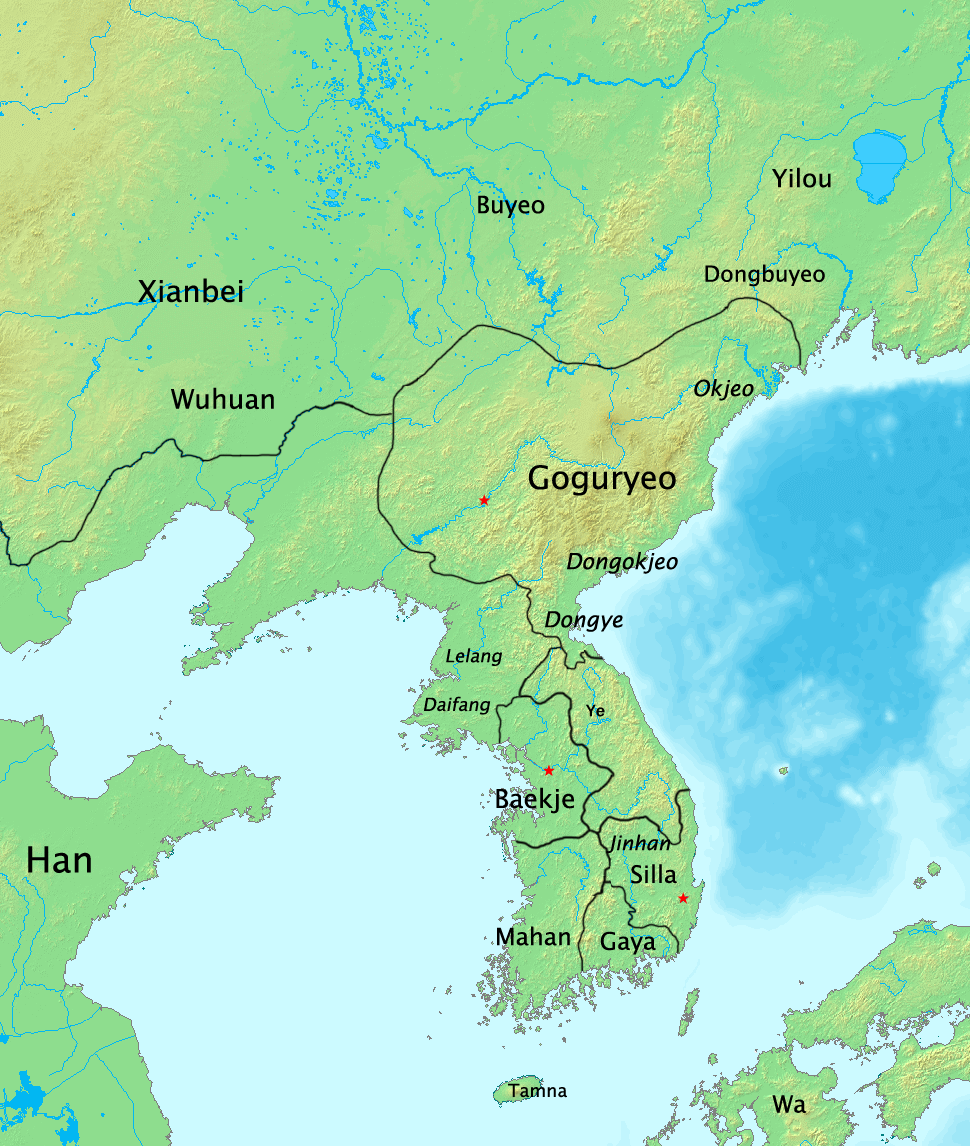
Four Commanderies of Han in 3rd century CE

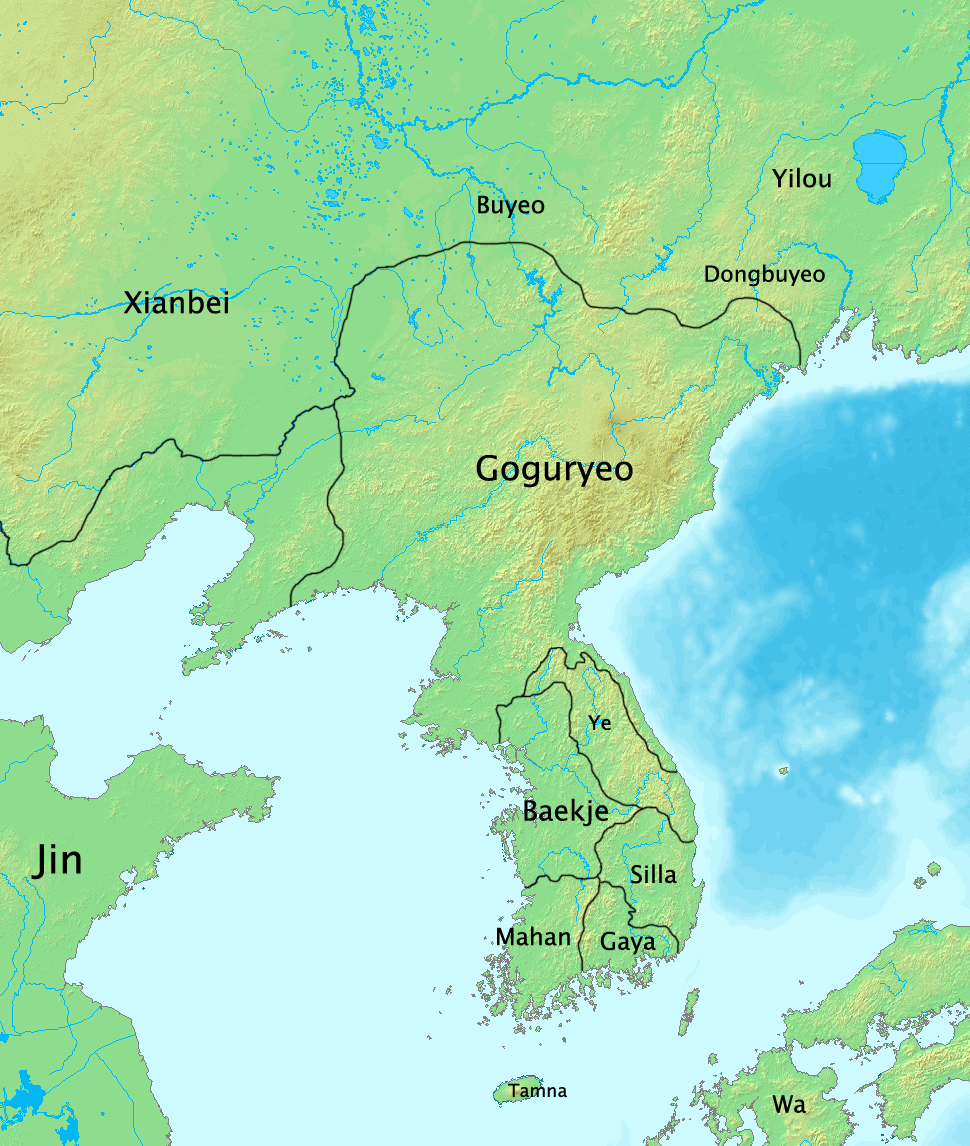
Korea in 315. Goguryeo recovered the former Old Chosŏn territory.

== See also ==
- Han conquest of Gojoseon
- Daifang Commandery
- Canghai Commandery
- Wiman Chosŏn

== Bibliography ==
- Barnes, Gina L. (2001), State Formation in Korea: Historical and Archaeological Perspectives, Routledge
- de Crespigny, Rafe (2007), A Biographical Dictionary of Later Han to the Three Kingdoms, Brill
- Lee, Ji-Young (2017), China's Hegemony: Four Hundred Years of East Asian Domination, Columbia University Press
- Park, Jun-hyeong (2013), The Han Commanderies in Early Korean History: A Reconsideration of the Han Commanderies from a Broader East Asian Perspective
- Xu, Stella (2016), Reconstructing Ancient Korean History: The Formation of Korean-ness in the Shadow of History, Lexington Books
