= Canghai Commandery =

Administrative division of the Chinese Han dynasty

Chinese name
- Traditional Chinese: 蒼海郡
- Simplified Chinese: 苍海郡
Transcriptions

Korean name
- Hangul: 창해군
- Hanja: 蒼海郡
Transcriptions
- Revised Romanization: Changhae-gun
- McCune–Reischauer: Ch'anghae-kun

The Canghai Commandery was an administrative division of the Chinese Han dynasty established by the Emperor Wu in 128 BCE.

== History ==
The commandery covered an area in northern Korean Peninsula to southern Manchuria. Nan Lü (Hanja: 南閭), who was a monarch of Dongye and a subject of Wiman Joseon, revolted against Ugeo of Gojoseon and then surrendered to the Han dynasty with 280,000 people. (Note: Book of the Later Han, Treatise on the Dongyi,元朔元年武帝年也., 濊君南閭等【集解】 惠棟曰, 顏籀云, 南閭者, 薉君之名.畔右渠, 率二十八萬口詣遼東內屬, 武帝以其地爲蒼海郡, 數年乃罷.) The Canghai Commandery was established following this revolution, however in 2 years, it was abolished by Gongsun Hong.

There is no historical information as to the exact location of the Canghai Commandery, but it is thought to be located in today's South Hamgyong Province or the Gangwon Province beside the Sea of Japan. The establishment of the Canghai Commandery encouraged the Han dynasty’s invasion of the Korean peninsula and it finally led to the establishment of the Four Commanderies of Han and the fall of Wiman Joseon. The Canghai Commandery had close relations with the Xuantu Commandery, which was one of the Four Commanderies of Han.

== See also ==
- Four Commanderies of Han
  - Lelang Commandery
  - Lintun Commandery
  - Xuantu Commandery
  - Zhenfan Commandery
- Daifang Commandery
