= Zhenfan Commandery =

One of the Four Commanderies of the Han Dynasty in Korea

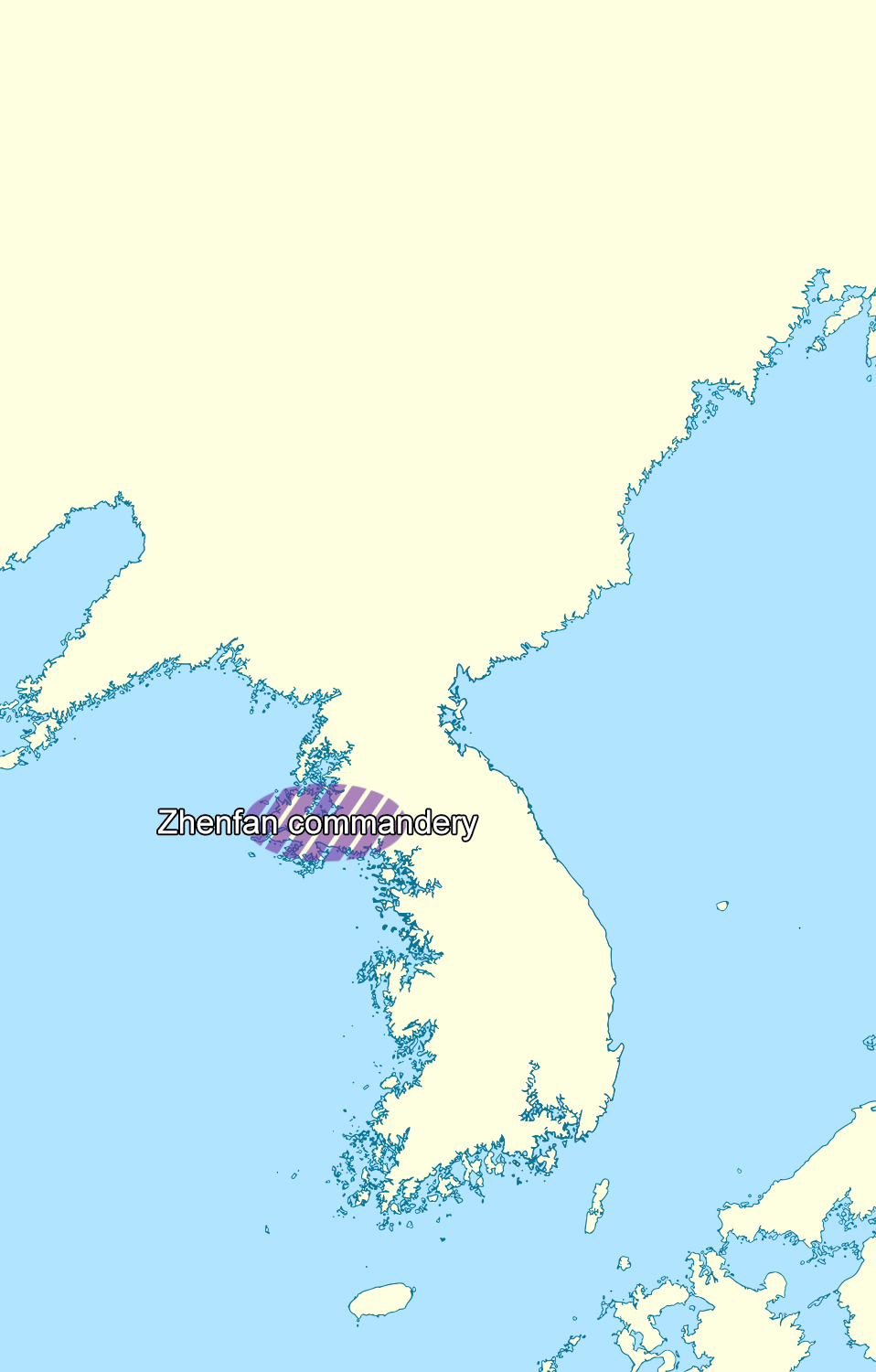
- Estimated location of the Zhenfan Commandery.

Chinese name
- Chinese: 真番郡
Transcriptions
Standard Mandarin
- Hanyu Pinyin: Zhēnfān Jùn

Korean name
- Hangul: 진번군
- Hanja: 眞番郡
Transcriptions
- Revised Romanization: Jinbeon-gun
- McCune–Reischauer: Chinpŏn-kun

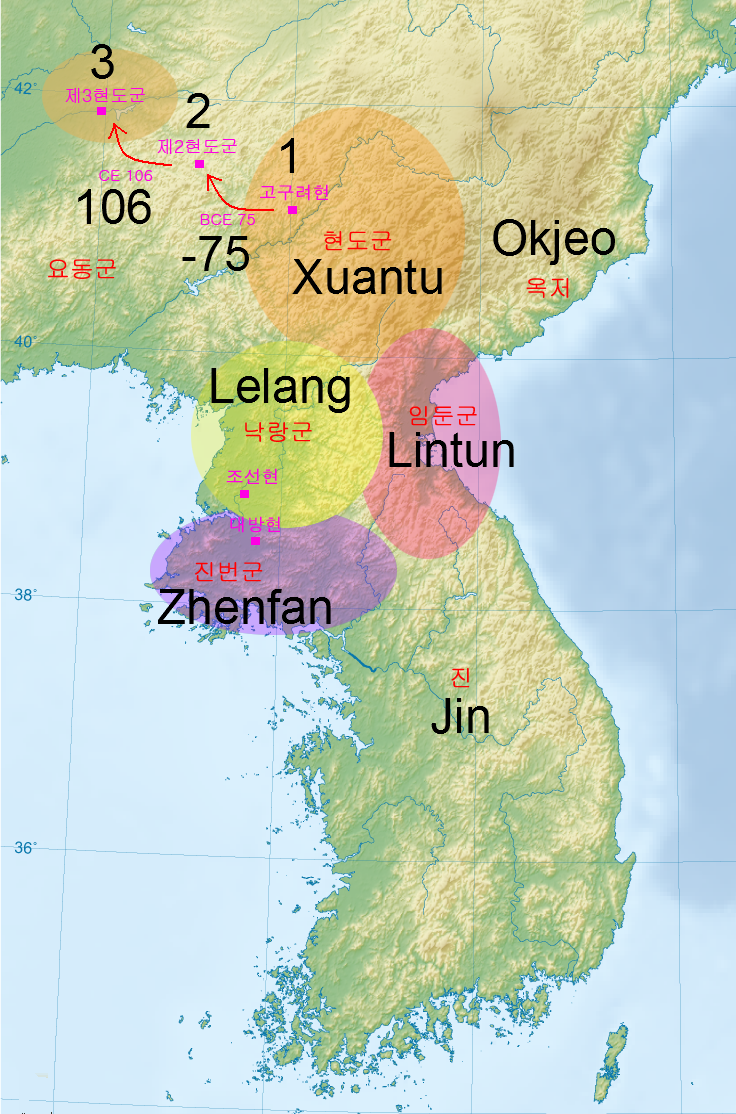
Zhenfan Commandery (purple) alongside the other Han commanderies in the region (100 BCE).

The Zhenfan Commandery was one of the Four Commanderies of the Chinese Han dynasty located on the Korean Peninsula. It existed between 108 BCE to 82 BCE.

== History ==
In 108 BCE, the Zhenfan Commandery was established under Youzhou by the Han dynasty. According to Maolingshu (茂陵書) compiled in the Han dynasty, the Zhenfan Commandery consisted of fifteen counties each, and was ruled from the Sa (Hanja: 霅) county, which was 3,000 km from Chang’an. Its territorial jurisdiction is unclear. In 82 BCE, Zhenfan Commandery was abolished.

== Controversy ==
There are two theories for the location of the Zhenfan Commandery. One theory has it located in the north of the Korean peninsula and the other further south. In the academic community, the southern theory is preferred. However, there are also some views that the Zhenfan Commandery was in the Gyeongsang Province, Chungcheong Province or in the southern part of Korea which includes the Gyeongsang Province and Jeolla Province.

== Historical revisionism ==
In the North Korean academic community and some parts of the South Korean academic community, the fact that at least part of the Korean peninsula was annexed by Han dynasty has been denied. They claim that the Four Commanderies of Han were actually located outside the Korean peninsula. They consider that the Four Commanderies were located in the Liaodong Commandery. In this theory, the location of Zhenfan Commandery is almost same as the eastern part of Liaodong Commandery.

These views are not accepted by the academic communities in the United States, China and Japan. (Note: United States Congress (2016). North Korea: A Country Study. Nova Science Publishers. p. 6. ISBN 978-1590334430.; "Han Chinese built four commanderies, or local military units, to rule the peninsula as far south as the Han River, with a core area at Lolang (Nangnang in Korean), near present-day P'yongyang. It is illustrative of the relentlessly different historiography practiced in North Korea and South Korea, as well as both countries' dubious projection backward of Korean nationalism, that North Korean historians denied that the Lolang district was centered in Korea and placed it northwest of the peninsula, possibly near Beijing.": Connor, Edgar V. (2003). Korea: Current Issues and Historical Background. Nova Science Publishers. p. 112. ISBN 978-1590334430.; "They place it northwest of the peninsula, possibly near Beijing, in order to de- emphasize China's influence on ancient Korean history.": Kim, Jinwung (2012). A History of Korea: From "Land of the Morning Calm" to States in Conflict. Indiana University Press. p. 18. ISBN 978-0253000248.; "Immediately after destroying Wiman Chosŏn, the Han empire established administrative units to rule large territories in the northern Korean peninsula and southern Manchuria.": Lee, Peter H. (1993). Sourcebook of Korean Civilization. Columbia University Press. p. 227. ISBN 978-0231079129.; "But when Emperor Wu conquered Choson, all the small barbarian tribes in the northeastern region were incorporated into the established Han commanderies because of the overwhelming military might of Han China.": Barnes, Gina (2000). State Formation in Korea. Routledge. p. 17. ISBN 978-0700713233.; "Despite recent suggestions by North Korean scholars that Lelang was not a Chinese commandery, the traditional view will be adhered to here. Lelang was one of four commanderies newly instituted by the Han Dynasty in 108 BC in the former region of Chaoxian. Of these four commanderies, only two (Lelang and Xuantu) survived successive reorganizations; and it seems that even these had their headquarters relocated once or twice.": Ch'oe, Yŏng-ho (May 1981), "Reinterpreting Traditional History in North Korea", The Journal of Asian Studies, 40 (3): 503–523, doi:10.2307/2054553, JSTOR 2054553, S2CID 145140808.; "North Korean scholars, however, admit that a small number of items in these tombs resemble those found in the archaeological sites of Han China. These items, they insist, must have been introduced into Korea through trade or other international contacts and "should not by any means be construed as a basis to deny the Korean characteristics of the artifacts" found in the P'yongyang area.": Clemens, Walter C. Jr. (2016). North Korea and the World: Human Rights, Arms Control, and Strategies for Negotiation. University Press of Kentucky. p. 26. ISBN 978-0813167466.; "Chinese forces subsequently conquered the eastern half of the peninsula and made lolang, near modern Pyongyang, the chief base for Chinese rule. Chinese sources recall how China used not only military force but also assassination and divide-and-conquer tactics to subdue Chosŏn and divide the territory into four commanderies.": Seth, Michael J. (2016). A Concise History of Korea: From Antiquity to the Present. Rowman & Littlefield Publishers. p. 19. ISBN 978-1442235175.; "The way of life maintained by the elite at the capital in the P'yongyang area, which is known from the tombs and scattered archaeological remains, evinces a prosperous, refined, and very Chinese culture.": Seth, Michael J. (2016). A Concise History of Korea: From Antiquity to the Present. Rowman & Littlefield Publishers. p. 17. ISBN 978-1442235175.; "The Chinese, having conquered Choson, set up four administrative units called commanderies. The Lelang commandery was located along the Ch'ongch'on and Taedong rivers from the coast to the interior highlands. Three other commanderies were organized: Xuantu, Lintun, and Zhenfan. Lintun and originally Xuantu were centered on the east coast of northern Korea. Zhenfan was probably located in the region south of Lelang, although there is some uncertainty about this. After Emperor Wu's death in 87 BCE a retrenchment began under his successor, Emperor Chao (87-74 BCE). In 82 BCE Lintun was merged into Xuantu, and Zhenfan into Lelang. Around 75 BCE Xuantu was relocated most probably in the Tonghua region of Manchuria and parts of old Lintun merged into Lelang. Later a Daifang commandery was created south of Lelang in what was later Hwanghae Province in northern Korea. Lelang was the more populous and prosperous outpost of Chinese civilization.": Bowman, John Stewart (2000). Columbia Chronologies of Asian History and Culture. Columbia University Press. p. 11. ISBN 978-0231110044.; "Han China resumes its effort to subdue Korea, launching two military expeditions that bring much of the peninsula under Chinese control; it sets up four commanderies in conquered Korea.": Mark E Byington, Project Director of the Early Korea Project (2009). Early Korea 2: The Samhan Period in Korean History. Korea Institute, Harvard University. p. 172. ISBN 978-0979580031.; "The latter, associated with Han China, are important, as their discovery permits us to infer the existence of relations between the Han commanderies and the Samhan societies.": Preucel, Robert W. (2010). Contemporary Archaeology in Theory: The New Pragmatism. Wiley-Blackwell. p. 296. ISBN 978-1-4051-5832-9.; "The Wei Ji (compiled 233–97) places the Yemaek in the Korean peninsula at the time of the Han commanderies in the first century BC, giving them a specifically Korean identity at least by that time.": Dr. Brian, Fagan (2016). Ancient Civilizations. Routledge. p. 365. ISBN 978-1138181632.; "In 108 B.C. most of the Korean peninsula was divided into four Han commanderies, the most important of which was Lelang.": Tuan, Yi-Fu (2008). A Historical Geography of China. Aldine Transaction. p. 84. ISBN 978-0202362007.; "Northeastwards Emperor Wu's forces conquered northern Korea in 108 b.c. and established four command headquarters there.": Kang, Jae-eun (2006). The Land of Scholars: Two Thousand Years of Korean Confucianism. Homa & Seka Books. p. 36. ISBN 978-1931907309.; "Nangnang commandery centered around Pyeong'yang was established when Emperor Wu of Han China attacked Gojoseon in 108 BC and was under the rule of Wei from 238. Wei is the country that destroyed the Later Han dynasty.": Armstrong, Charles K. (1995), "Centering the Periphery: Manchurian Exile(s) and the North Korean State" (PDF), Korean Studies, 19: 1–16, doi:10.1353/ks.1995.0017, S2CID 154659765; "North Korean historiography from the 1970s onward has stressed the unique, even sui generis, nature of Korean civilization going back to Old Chosön, whose capital, Wanggömsöng, is now located in the Liao River basin in Manchuria rather than near Pyongyang. Nangnang, then, was not a Chinese commandery but a Korean kingdom, based in the area of Pyongyang.": Pratt, Keith (2006). Everlasting Flower: A History of Korea. Reaktion Books. p. 10. ISBN 978-1861892737.; "108 BC: Han armies invade Wiman Choson; Chinese commanderies are set up across the north of the peninsula": Nelson, Sarah Milledge (1993). The Archaeology of Korea. Cambridge University Press. p. 168. ISBN 9780521407830.; "The Chinese commanderies did not extend to the southern half of the peninsula, stretching perhaps as far south as the Han river at the greatest extent, but they did reach the northeast coast.": Jones, F. C. (1966). The Far East: A Concise History. Pergamon Press. p. 34. ISBN 978-0080116419.; "He then divided the country into military districts, of which the most important was that of Lolang, or Laklang, with headquarters near the modern Pyongyang. Tomb excavations in this area have produced much evidence of the influence of Han civilization in northern Korea.": Swanström, Niklas (2009). Sino-Japanese Relations: The Need for Conflict Prevention and Management. Cambridge Scholars Publishing. p. 13. ISBN 978-1847186201.; "Under Emperor Wu-ti, Han China extended her influence into Korea, and in 108 B.C., the peninsula became a part of the Chinese Empire, with four dependent provinces under the Chinese charge.": Meyer, Milton W. (1997). Asia: A Concise History. Rowman & Littlefield Publishers. p. 118. ISBN 978-0847680634.; "In southern Manchuria, and northern and central Korea, the Chinese established four commanderies, which were subdivided into prefectures.": Olsen, Edward (2005). Korea, the Divided Nation. Praeger. p. 13. ISBN 978-0275983079.; "The Han dynasty created four outposts in Korea to control that portion of its border.": Hwang, Kyung Moon (2010). A History of Korea: An Episodic Narrativea. Palgrave MacMillan. p. 4. ISBN 978-0230205451.; "In the corridor between the peninsula and northeast China, the Chinese Han dynasty established four “commanderies” that ruled over parts of the peninsula and Manchuria, much as modern imperial powers governed their colonies.": Eckert, Carter J. (1991). Korea Old and New: A History. Ilchokak Publishers. p. 13. ISBN 978-0962771309.; "The territorial extent of the Four Chinese Commanderies seems to have been limited to the area north of the Han River.")

== See also ==
- Four Commanderies of Han
  - Lelang Commandery
  - Lintun Commandery
  - Xuantu Commandery
- Daifang Commandery
- Canghai Commandery

== Bibliography ==
- 譚其驤等『中國歷史地圖集』北京・中国地图出版社、1974年
- 周振鶴『西漢政區地理』北京・人民出版社、1987年
- 李曉傑『東漢政區地理』濟南：山東教育出版社、1999年
