= Lintun Commandery =

One of the four commanderies of the Han dynasty in Korea

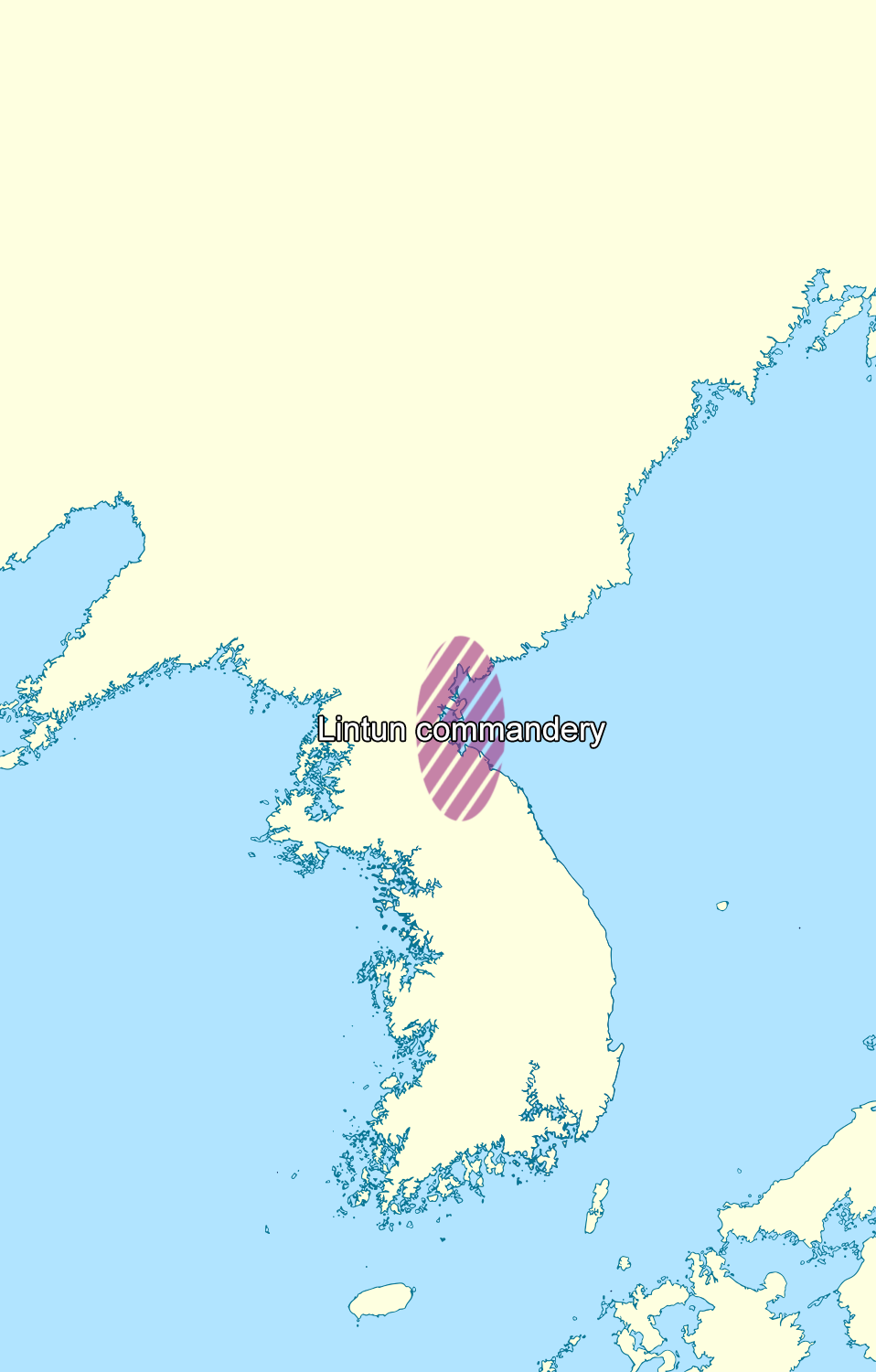
- Estimated location of the Lintun Commandery.

Chinese name
- Chinese: 臨屯郡
Transcriptions
Standard Mandarin
- Hanyu Pinyin: Líntún jùn

Korean name
- Hangul: 임둔군
- Hanja: 臨屯郡
Transcriptions
- Revised Romanization: Imdun-gun
- McCune–Reischauer: Imtun-kun

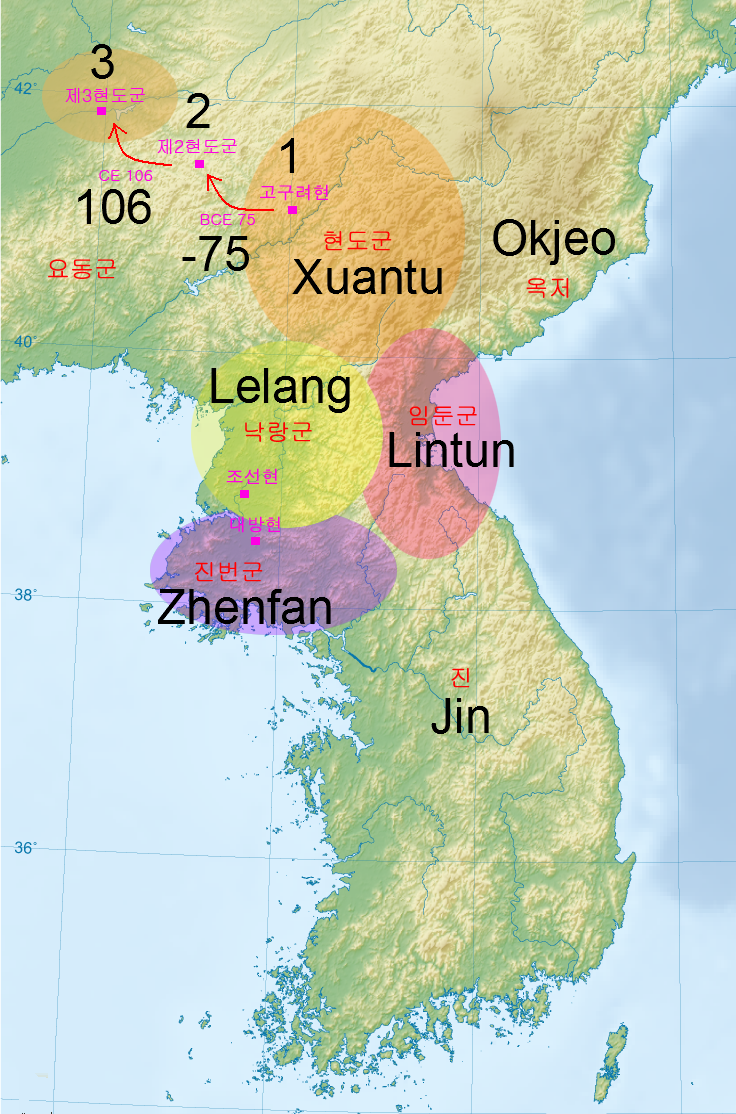
Lintun Commandery (pink) alongside the other Han commanderies in the region (100 BCE).

Lintun Commandery was a commandery established in the Korean Peninsula by the Chinese Han dynasty. Lintun Commandery was one of the Four Commanderies of Han along with Lelang Commandery, Xuantu Commandery and Zhenfan Commandery.

== History ==
In BCE 108, Lintun Commandery was established as part of Youzhou by Han dynasty. This commandery was formed by 15 prefectures and its border is almost the same as the current Gangwon Province. Dongyi (Hanja: 東暆) prefecture (present-day Gangneung City), the main office for this commandery was about 2400 km away from Chang'an. In 82 BCE, 9 prefectures out of 15 had been abolished and 7 prefectures including Fuzu/Bujo (Hanja: 夫租) prefecture were incorporated to Lelang Commandery. At this point, Lintun Commandery was disappeared from history.

== Administrative area ==
Administrative area of Lintun Commandery
Name	Characters	Present location	Remarks
Dongyi prefecture (former)	東暆	Gangneung City, Gangwon Province	Main office of Lintun Commandery.
Dongyi prefecture (new)	東暆	Wonsan, Gangwon Province,	After incorporation into Lelang Commandery, main office moved from former Dongyi prefecture.
Buer prefecture	不而	Anbyon County, Gangwon Province	Main office after incorporation into Lelang Commandery.
Cantai prefecture	蠶台	Sokcho, Gangwon Province	Incorporated into Lelang Commandery in 82 BCE.
Huali prefecture	華麗	Kumya County, South Hamgyong Province	Incorporated to Lelang Commandery in 82 BCE.
Xietoumei prefecture	邪頭昧	Munchon, Gangwon Province	Incorporated into Lelang Commandery in 82 BCE.
Qianmo prefecture	前莫	Goseong County, Gangwon Province	Incorporated into Lelang Commandery in 82 BCE.
Other 9 prefectures		Somewhere in present-day Gangwon Province	Those prefectures were not incorporated into Lelang Commandery and disappeared in 82 BCE .

== Historical revisionism ==
In the North Korean academic community and some part of the South Korean academic community, the Han dynasty's annexation of the Korean peninsula have been denied. Proponents of this revisionist theory claim that the Four Commanderies of Han actually existed outside of the Korean peninsula, and place them somewhere in Liaodong Commandery, China instead. According to this theory, the Lintun Commandery was said to be located in the southern part of Liaodong peninsula, especially in Jinzhou peninsula.

These hypotheses are "dictatorial" in the academic community of North Korea, which is supported by the amateur historical enthusiasts in South Korea, but this theory is not recognized at all in the academic circles of the United States, China and Japan. (Note: United States Congress (2016). North Korea: A Country Study. Nova Science Publishers. p. 6. ISBN 978-1590334430.; "Han Chinese built four commanderies, or local military units, to rule the peninsula as far south as the Han River, with a core area at Lolang (Nangnang in Korean), near present-day P'yongyang. It is illustrative of the relentlessly different historiography practiced in North Korea and South Korea, as well as both countries' dubious projection backward of Korean nationalism, that North Korean historians denied that the Lolang district was centered in Korea and placed it northwest of the peninsula, possibly near Beijing.": Connor, Edgar V. (2003). Korea: Current Issues and Historical Background. Nova Science Publishers. p. 112. ISBN 978-1590334430.; "They place it northwest of the peninsula, possibly near Beijing, in order to de- emphasize China's influence on ancient Korean history.": Kim, Jinwung (2012). A History of Korea: From "Land of the Morning Calm" to States in Conflict. Indiana University Press. p. 18. ISBN 978-0253000248.; "Immediately after destroying Wiman Chosŏn, the Han empire established administrative units to rule large territories in the northern Korean peninsula and southern Manchuria.": Lee, Peter H. (1993). Sourcebook of Korean Civilization. Columbia University Press. p. 227. ISBN 978-0231079129.; "But when Emperor Wu conquered Choson, all the small barbarian tribes in the northeastern region were incorporated into the established Han commanderies because of the overwhelming military might of Han China.": Barnes, Gina (2000). State Formation in Korea. Routledge. p. 17. ISBN 978-0700713233.; "Despite recent suggestions by North Korean scholars that Lelang was not a Chinese commandery, the traditional view will be adhered to here. Lelang was one of four commanderies newly instituted by the Han Dynasty in 108 BC in the former region of Chaoxian. Of these four commanderies, only two (Lelang and Xuantu) survived successive reorganizations; and it seems that even these had their headquarters relocated once or twice.": Ch'oe, Yŏng-ho (May 1981), "Reinterpreting Traditional History in North Korea", The Journal of Asian Studies, 40 (3): 503–523, doi:10.2307/2054553, JSTOR 2054553, S2CID 145140808.; "North Korean scholars, however, admit that a small number of items in these tombs resemble those found in the archaeological sites of Han China. These items, they insist, must have been introduced into Korea through trade or other international contacts and "should not by any means be construed as a basis to deny the Korean characteristics of the artifacts" found in the P'yongyang area.": Clemens, Walter C. Jr. (2016). North Korea and the World: Human Rights, Arms Control, and Strategies for Negotiation. University Press of Kentucky. p. 26. ISBN 978-0813167466.; "Chinese forces subsequently conquered the eastern half of the peninsula and made lolang, near modern Pyongyang, the chief base for Chinese rule. Chinese sources recall how China used not only military force but also assassination and divide-and-conquer tactics to subdue Chosŏn and divide the territory into four commanderies.": Seth, Michael J. (2016). A Concise History of Korea: From Antiquity to the Present. Rowman & Littlefield Publishers. p. 19. ISBN 978-1442235175.; "The way of life maintained by the elite at the capital in the P'yongyang area, which is known from the tombs and scattered archaeological remains, evinces a prosperous, refined, and very Chinese culture.": Seth, Michael J. (2016). A Concise History of Korea: From Antiquity to the Present. Rowman & Littlefield Publishers. p. 17. ISBN 978-1442235175.; "The Chinese, having conquered Choson, set up four administrative units called commanderies. The Lelang commandery was located along the Ch'ongch'on and Taedong rivers from the coast to the interior highlands. Three other commanderies were organized: Xuantu, Lintun, and Zhenfan. Lintun and originally Xuantu were centered on the east coast of northern Korea. Zhenfan was probably located in the region south of Lelang, although there is some uncertainty about this. After Emperor Wu's death in 87 BCE a retrenchment began under his successor, Emperor Chao (87-74 BCE). In 82 BCE Lintun was merged into Xuantu, and Zhenfan into Lelang. Around 75 BCE Xuantu was relocated most probably in the Tonghua region of Manchuria and parts of old Lintun merged into Lelang. Later a Daifang commandery was created south of Lelang in what was later Hwanghae Province in northern Korea. Lelang was the more populous and prosperous outpost of Chinese civilization.": Bowman, John Stewart (2000). Columbia Chronologies of Asian History and Culture. Columbia University Press. p. 11. ISBN 978-0231110044.; "Han China resumes its effort to subdue Korea, launching two military expeditions that bring much of the peninsula under Chinese control; it sets up four commanderies in conquered Korea.": Mark E Byington, Project Director of the Early Korea Project (2009). Early Korea 2: The Samhan Period in Korean History. Korea Institute, Harvard University. p. 172. ISBN 978-0979580031.; "The latter, associated with Han China, are important, as their discovery permits us to infer the existence of relations between the Han commanderies and the Samhan societies.": Preucel, Robert W. (2010). Contemporary Archaeology in Theory: The New Pragmatism. Wiley-Blackwell. p. 296. ISBN 978-1-4051-5832-9.; "The Wei Ji (compiled 233–97) places the Yemaek in the Korean peninsula at the time of the Han commanderies in the first century BC, giving them a specifically Korean identity at least by that time.": Dr. Brian, Fagan (2016). Ancient Civilizations. Routledge. p. 365. ISBN 978-1138181632.; "In 108 B.C. most of the Korean peninsula was divided into four Han commanderies, the most important of which was Lelang.": Tuan, Yi-Fu (2008). A Historical Geography of China. Aldine Transaction. p. 84. ISBN 978-0202362007.; "Northeastwards Emperor Wu's forces conquered northern Korea in 108 b.c. and established four command headquarters there.": Kang, Jae-eun (2006). The Land of Scholars: Two Thousand Years of Korean Confucianism. Homa & Seka Books. p. 36. ISBN 978-1931907309.; "Nangnang commandery centered around Pyeong'yang was established when Emperor Wu of Han China attacked Gojoseon in 108 BC and was under the rule of Wei from 238. Wei is the country that destroyed the Later Han dynasty.": Armstrong, Charles K. (1995), "Centering the Periphery: Manchurian Exile(s) and the North Korean State" (PDF), Korean Studies, 19: 1–16, doi:10.1353/ks.1995.0017, S2CID 154659765; "North Korean historiography from the 1970s onward has stressed the unique, even sui generis, nature of Korean civilization going back to Old Chosön, whose capital, Wanggömsöng, is now located in the Liao River basin in Manchuria rather than near Pyongyang. Nangnang, then, was not a Chinese commandery but a Korean kingdom, based in the area of Pyongyang.": Pratt, Keith (2006). Everlasting Flower: A History of Korea. Reaktion Books. p. 10. ISBN 978-1861892737.; "108 BC: Han armies invade Wiman Choson; Chinese commanderies are set up across the north of the peninsula": Nelson, Sarah Milledge (1993). The Archaeology of Korea. Cambridge University Press. p. 168. ISBN 9780521407830.; "The Chinese commanderies did not extend to the southern half of the peninsula, stretching perhaps as far south as the Han river at the greatest extent, but they did reach the northeast coast.": Jones, F. C. (1966). The Far East: A Concise History. Pergamon Press. p. 34. ISBN 978-0080116419.; "He then divided the country into military districts, of which the most important was that of Lolang, or Laklang, with headquarters near the modern Pyongyang. Tomb excavations in this area have produced much evidence of the influence of Han civilization in northern Korea.": Swanström, Niklas (2009). Sino-Japanese Relations: The Need for Conflict Prevention and Management. Cambridge Scholars Publishing. p. 13. ISBN 978-1847186201.; "Under Emperor Wu-ti, Han China extended her influence into Korea, and in 108 B.C., the peninsula became a part of the Chinese Empire, with four dependent provinces under the Chinese charge.": Meyer, Milton W. (1997). Asia: A Concise History. Rowman & Littlefield Publishers. p. 118. ISBN 978-0847680634.; "In southern Manchuria, and northern and central Korea, the Chinese established four commanderies, which were subdivided into prefectures.": Olsen, Edward (2005). Korea, the Divided Nation. Praeger. p. 13. ISBN 978-0275983079.; "The Han dynasty created four outposts in Korea to control that portion of its border.": Hwang, Kyung Moon (2010). A History of Korea: An Episodic Narrativea. Palgrave MacMillan. p. 4. ISBN 978-0230205451.; "In the corridor between the peninsula and northeast China, the Chinese Han dynasty established four “commanderies” that ruled over parts of the peninsula and Manchuria, much as modern imperial powers governed their colonies.": Eckert, Carter J. (1991). Korea Old and New: A History. Ilchokak Publishers. p. 13. ISBN 978-0962771309.; "The territorial extent of the Four Chinese Commanderies seems to have been limited to the area north of the Han River.")

== See also ==
- Four Commanderies of Han
  - Lelang Commandery
  - Xuantu Commandery
  - Zhenfan Commandery
- Daifang Commandery
- Canghai Commandery
