= Xuantu Commandery =

Commandery of the Chinese Han dynasty

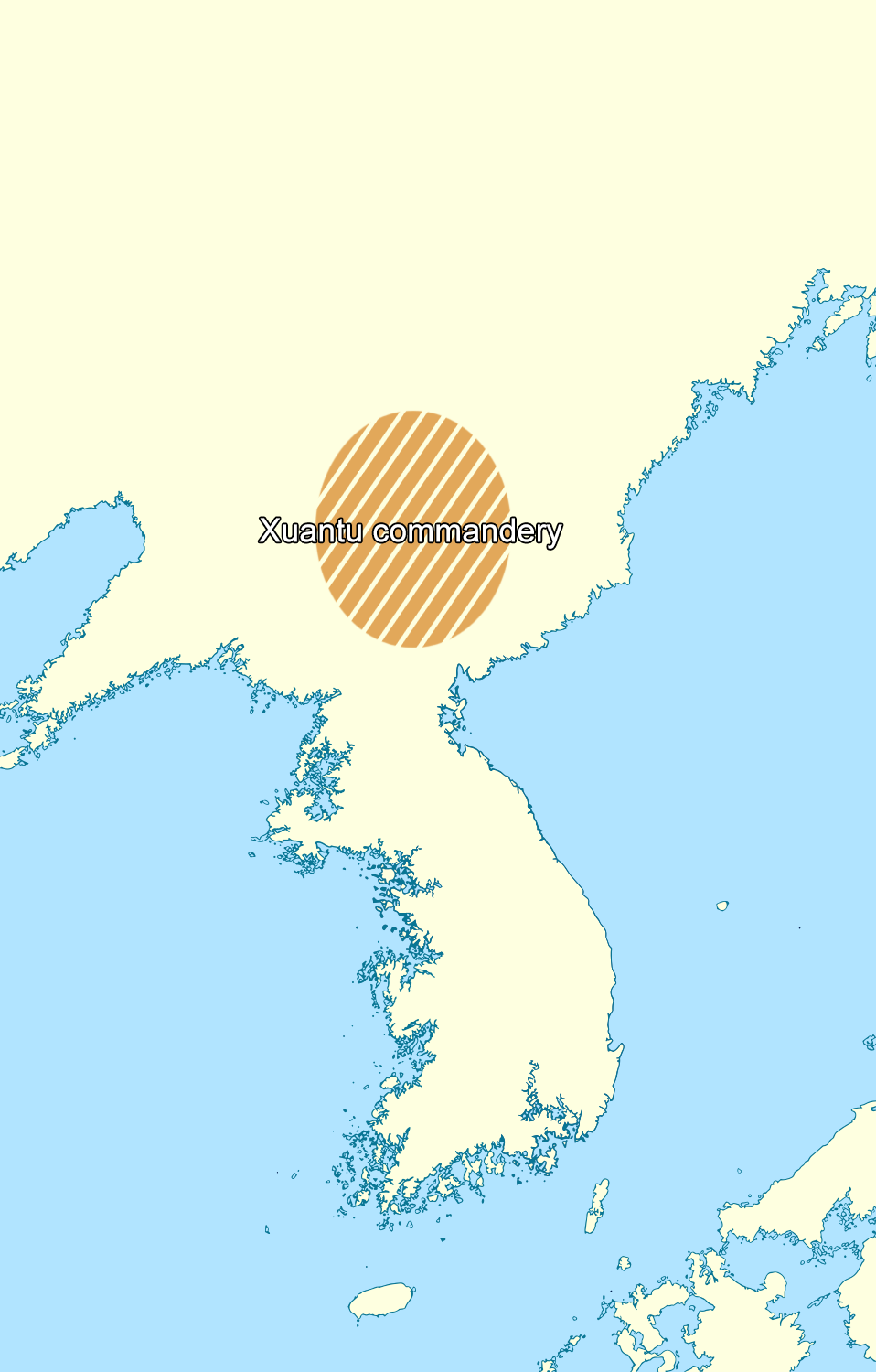
- Estimated location of the Xuantu Commandery.

Chinese name
- Chinese: 玄菟郡
Transcriptions
Standard Mandarin
- Hanyu Pinyin: Xuántú Jùn

Korean name
- Hangul: 현도군
- Hanja: 玄菟郡
Transcriptions
- Revised Romanization: Hyeondo-gun
- McCune–Reischauer: Hyŏndo-kun

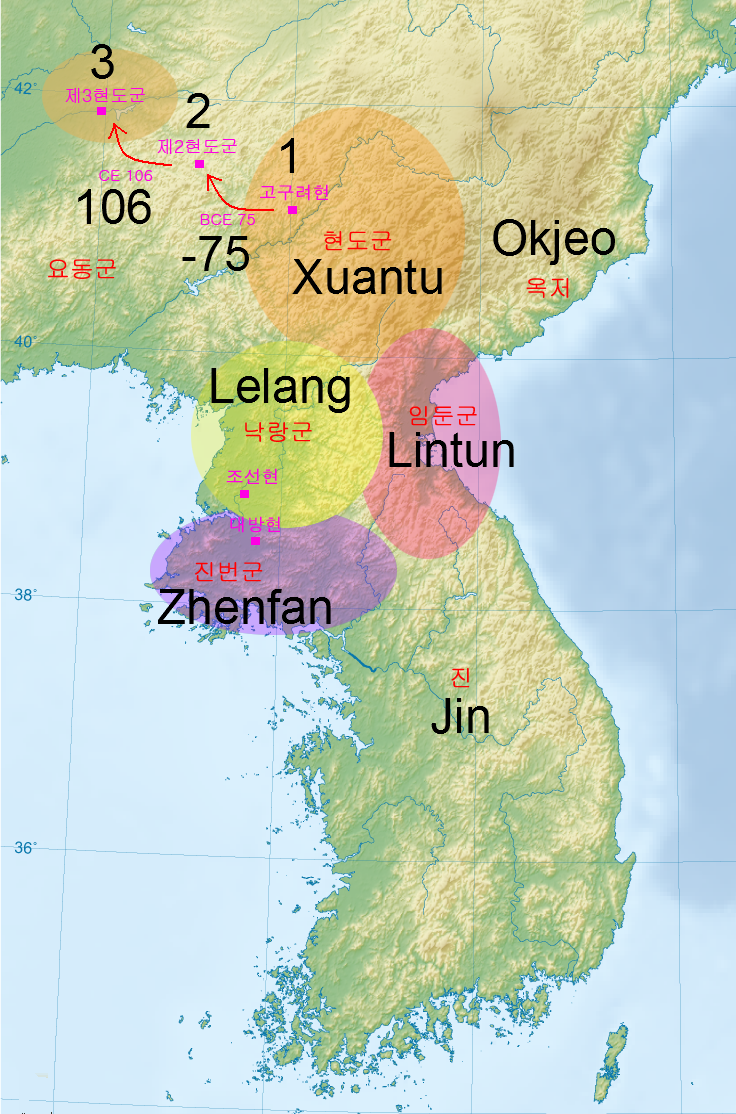
Xuantu Commandery (orange) alongside the other Han commanderies in the region (100 BCE).

Xuantu Commandery (Chinese: 玄菟郡; Korean: 현도군) was a commandery of the Chinese Han dynasty. It was one of Four Commanderies of Han, established in 107 BCE in the northern Korean Peninsula and part of the Liaodong Peninsula, after the Han dynasty conquered Wiman Chosŏn. Xuantu moved its capital to Liaodong in 75 BC due to native resistance and the area formerly under the Lintun Commandery was transferred to the Lelang Commandery. Xuantu was conquered by Goguryeo in 319 CE.

== History ==
In 82 BCE, the Han dynasty reduced its commandery units; Lintun Commandery merged with Xuantu as a result. In 75 BCE, the Xuantu Commandery was forced to move its seat from Fort Okjeo (沃沮城) to Gaogouli County due to raids by the Maek tribes (貊), a likely reference to Gaogouli. As a result, some of its previous counties had now to be abandoned or reassigned, seven of which were subject to Lelang Commandery, the so-called "seven counties beyond the eastern pass" (嶺東七縣).

As a result of the change, only three counties remained under Xuantu Commandery: Gaogouli County, Shangyintai (上殷台) and Xigaima (西蓋馬).

The Book of Han records 45,006 households and 221,845 individuals in Xuantu Commandery for year 2 CE.

When General Sima Yi of Cao Wei conquered Gongsun Yuan in his military campaign against Liaodong in 238, there remained only four counties in the new Xuantu Commandery that had retreated west (present-day Fushun): Gaogouli, Gaoxian (高顯), Liaoyang (遼陽), and Wangping (望平). Xuantu was conquered by Goguryeo in 319 CE.

== Historical revisionism ==
In the North Korean academic community and some part of the South Korean academic community, the Han dynasty's annexation of parts of the Korean peninsula have been denied. Proponents of this revisionist theory claim that the Four Commanderies of Han actually existed outside of the Korean peninsula, and place them somewhere in Liaodong Commandery, China instead. According to this theory, the Xuantu Commandery was said to be located in Shenyang.

These hypotheses are authoritative in the academic community of North Korea, which is supported by the amateur historical enthusiasts in South Korea, but this theory is not recognized at all in the academic circles of the United States, China and Japan.

== Maps ==
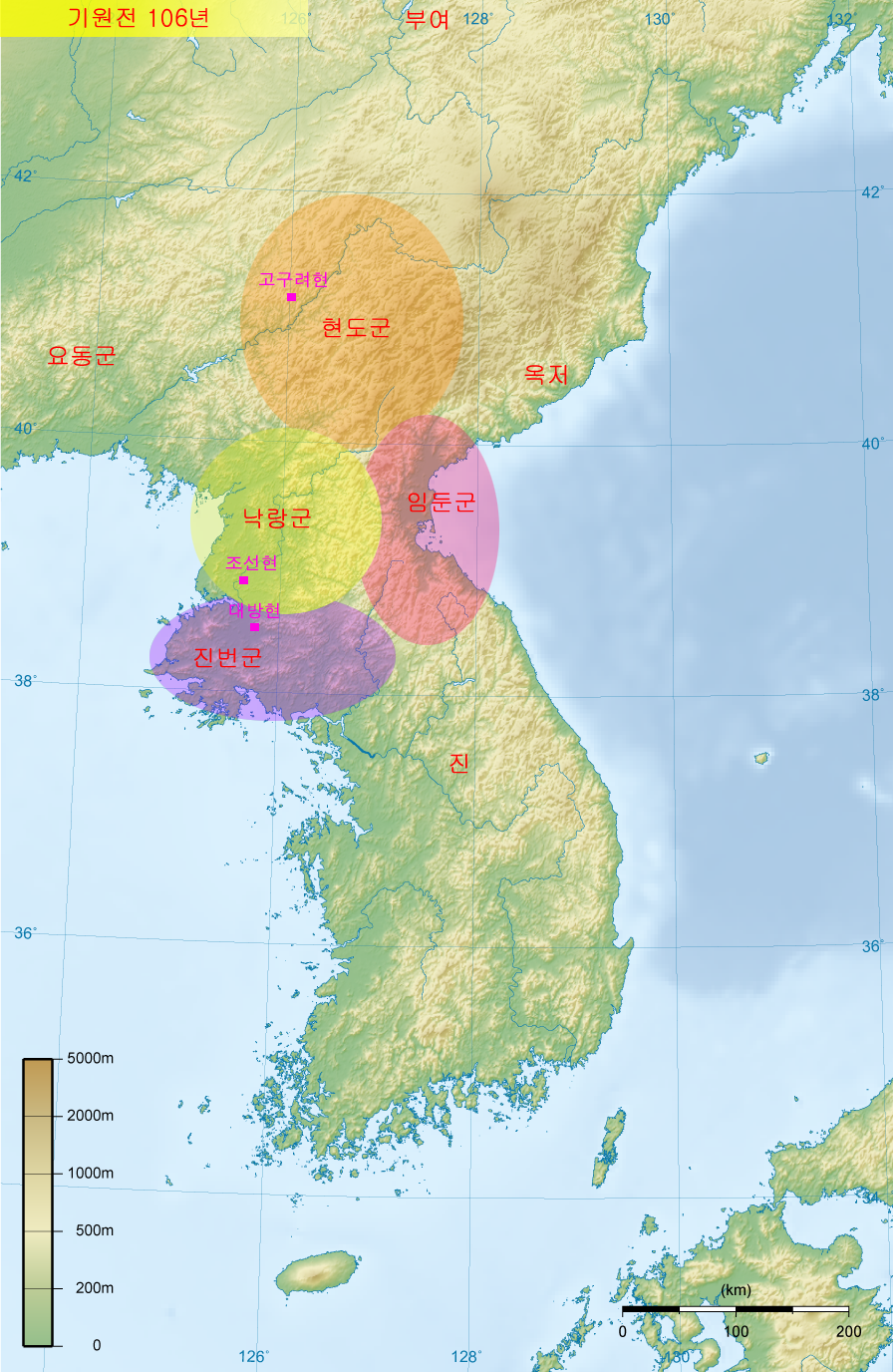
Four Commanderies of Han with Jin in 106 BC

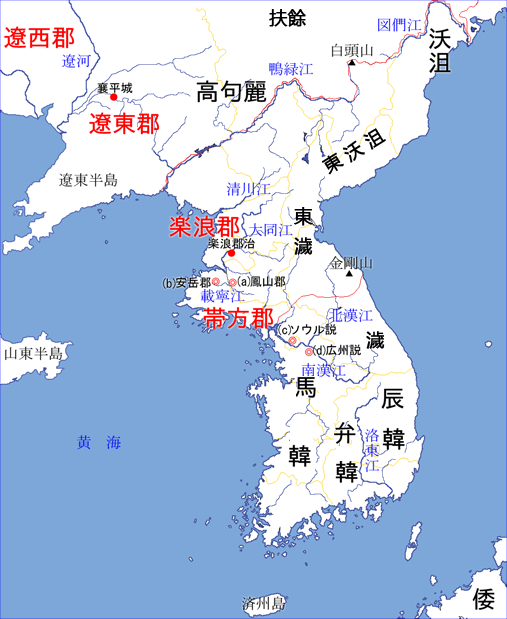
Four Commanderies of Han in 3 CE

== See also ==
- Four Commanderies of Han
  - Lelang Commandery
  - Lintun Commandery
  - Zhenfan Commandery
- Daifang Commandery
- Canghai Commandery

== Bibliography ==
- Park, Jun-hyeong (2013), The Han Commanderies in Early Korean History: A Reconsideration of the Han Commanderies from a Broader East Asian Perspective
