= Lelang Commandery =

One of the Four Commanderies of the Han dynasty in Korea

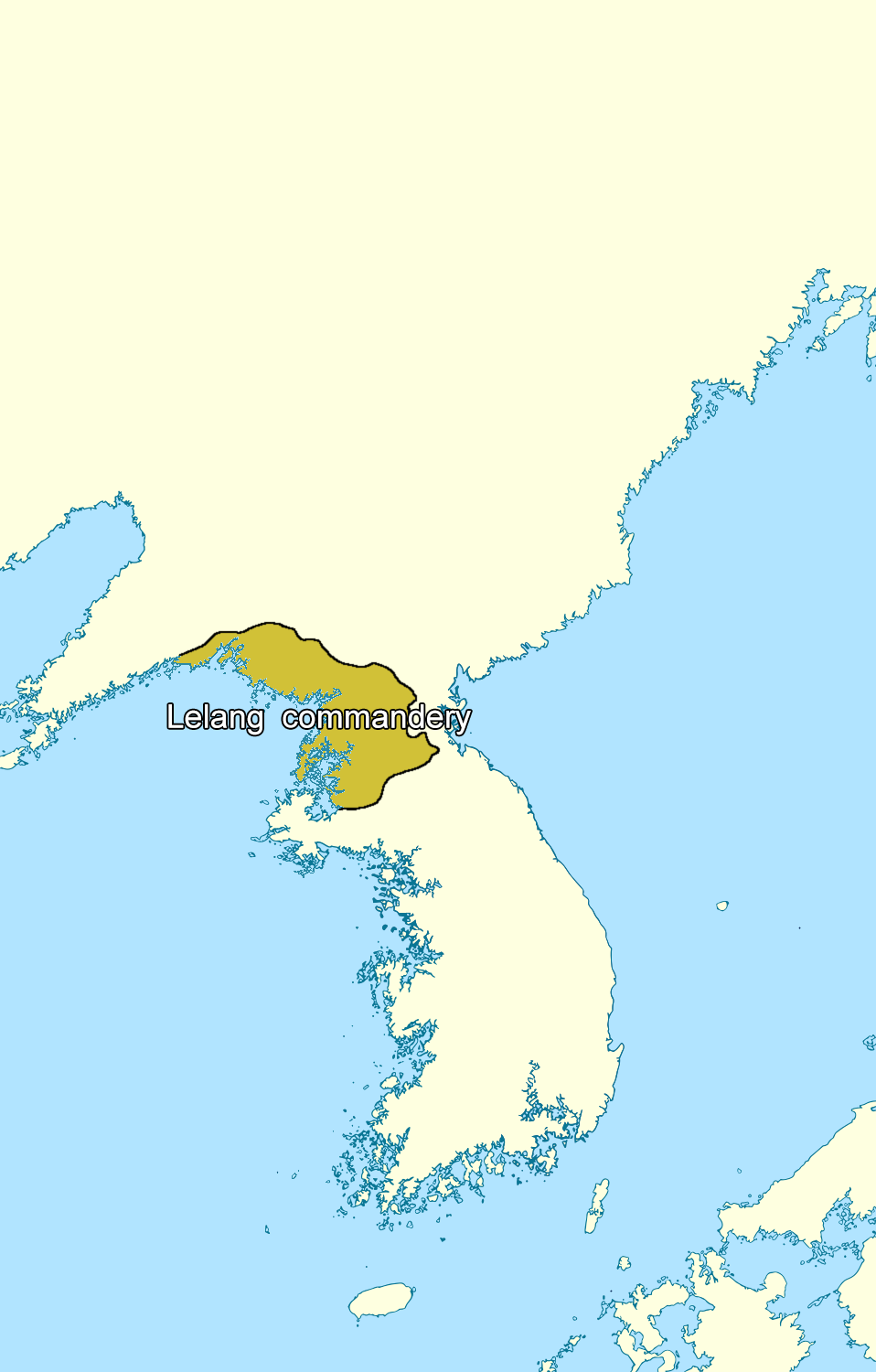
- Lelang Commandery in the early 4th century

Chinese name
- Traditional Chinese: 樂浪郡
- Simplified Chinese: 乐浪郡
Transcriptions
Standard Mandarin
- Hanyu Pinyin: Lèlàng Jùn

North Korean name
- Chosŏn'gŭl: 락랑군
- Hancha: 樂浪郡
Transcriptions
- Revised Romanization: Rangnang-gun
- McCune–Reischauer: Rangnang-gun

South Korean name
- Hangul: 낙랑군
- Hanja: 樂浪郡
Transcriptions
- Revised Romanization: Nangnang-gun
- McCune–Reischauer: Nangnang-gun

Japanese name
- Kanji: 楽浪郡
- Hiragana: らくろうぐん
Transcriptions
- Romanization: Rakurō-gun

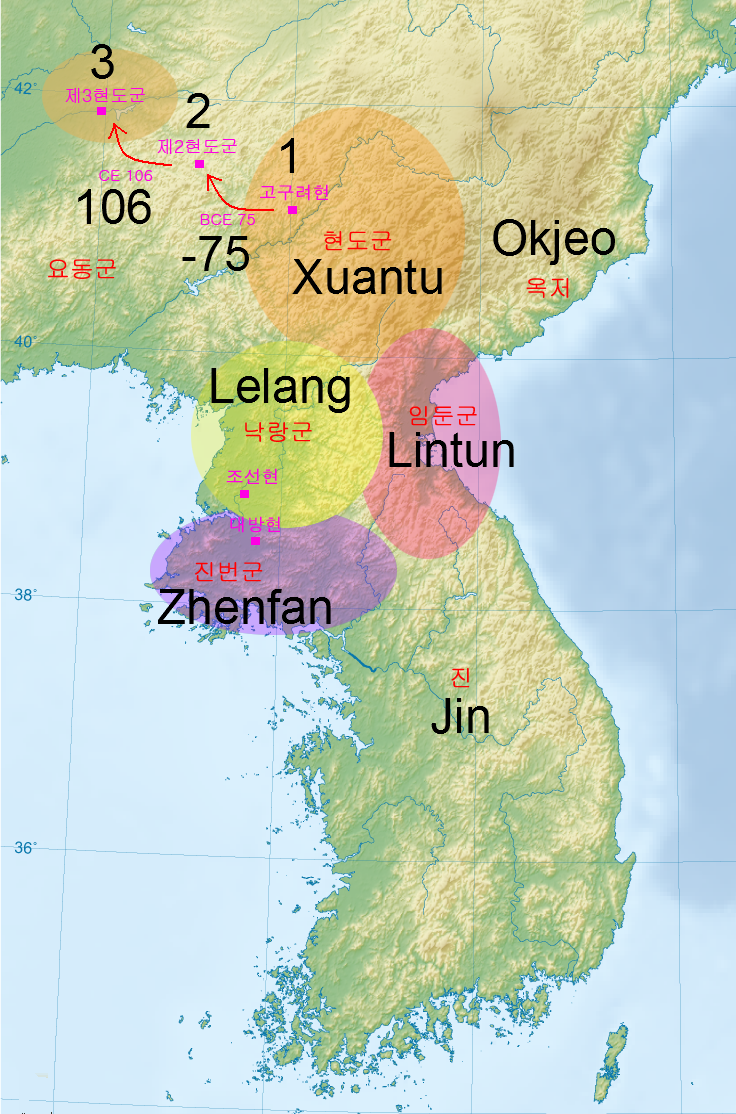
Lelang Commandery (yellow) alongside the other Han commanderies in the region (100 BCE).

The Lelang Commandery was a commandery of the Han dynasty established in Old Chosŏn after defeating the Wiman dynasty in 108 BCE and lasted until Goguryeo conquered it in 313 CE. The Lelang Commandery extended the rule of the Four Commanderies of Han as far south as the Han River in present-day South Korea. South Korean scholars have described its administrative areas as being limited to the Pyongan and Hwanghae regions, whose southern bounds lie roughly 75 miles north of the Han River.

== History ==
=== Han dynasty ===
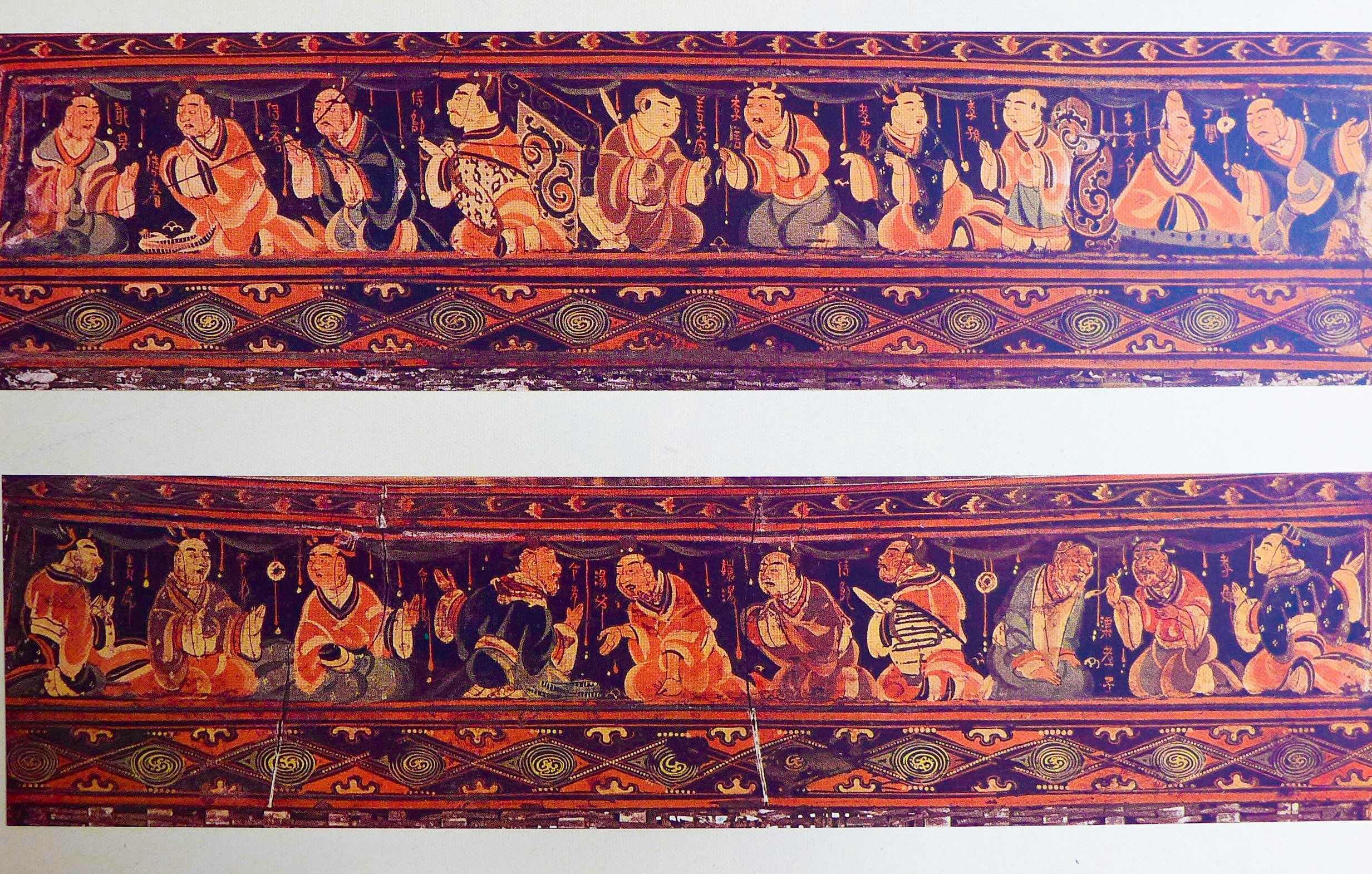
A scene of historic paragons of filial piety, Chinese painted artwork on a lacquered basketwork box, excavated from an Eastern-Han tomb in Lelang Commandery.

In 108 BCE, Emperor Wu of the Han dynasty conquered the area under King Ugŏ, a grandson of King Wiman. The Emperor set up Lelang, Lintun, Xuantu and Zhenfan, known as the Four Commanderies of Han in the northern Korean peninsula and Liaodong peninsula. The Book of Han records Lelang belonged to Youzhou, located in northwestern Old Chosŏn consisted of 25 prefectures, 62,812 houses, and the population was 406,748. Its capital, then the prefecture of Joseon (朝鮮縣, 조선현), was located at modern Pyongyang. (Rakrang 樂浪/락랑, a district in central P'yŏngyang today, is named after Lelang.)

After Emperor Wu's death, Zhenfan and Lintun were abolished and Xuantu was moved to Liaodong. Some prefectures of the abolished commanderies were incorporated into Lelang. Lelang after the consolidation is sometimes called "Greater Lelang Commandery". Since Lelang became too large, the Defender of the Southern Section (南部都尉) was set up to rule the seven prefectures which formerly belonged to Zhenfan. Before that, the Defender of the Eastern Section (東部都尉) was set up to rule former Lintun's seven prefectures.

While the Han dynasty was taken over by Wang Mang, Wang Tiao (王調) started a rebellion and tried to secede from China. In 30 CE, the rebellion was stopped by Wang Zun (王遵), whom Emperor Guangwu appointed as governor. The Han dynasty reasserted its authority over Lelang in the late 1st and 2nd centuries. However, the shortage of human resources caused by the turmoil resulted in the abolishment of the seven eastern prefectures. The administration was left to the Eastern Ye natives, whose chiefs were conferred as marquises.

At the end of the Eastern Han dynasty, Gongsun Du, appointed as the Governor of Liaodong in 184, extended his semi-independent domain to the Lelang and Xuantu commanderies. His son Gongsun Kang separated the southern half from the Lelang Commandery and established the Daifang Commandery sometime between 204 and 220. As a result, the Lelang Commandery reverted to its original size.

=== Cao Wei ===
In 238, under the order of Emperor Ming of Cao Wei, Sima Yi overthrew the Gongsun family and annexed Liaodong, Lelang and Daifang to Wei. Sima Yi did not encourage frontier settlers to continue their livelihoods in the Chinese northeast and instead ordered households who wished to return to coastal and central China to do so, evacuating the region of Chinese settlers. The Book of Jin records the number of households in the Korean commanderies of Lelang and Daifang as 8,600 households, less than a sixth of the figures given in the Book of the Later Han for Lelang (which included Daifang). Liaodong would be out of Chinese hands for centuries due to the lack of Chinese presence there as a result of the policies the Wei court adopted for the commanderies after the fall of the Gongsun family.

=== Jin dynasty ===
As the only remaining territory in Korea, Lelang was then inherited by the Jin dynasty. However, due to constant civil wars within China and the geographical isolation of the commandery, Jin was unable to control its holdings within the northern section of the Korean peninsula at the beginning of the 4th century and was no longer able to dispatch officials to the frontier commanderies, which were maintained by the dwindling local population of remaining Han Chinese residents. The Zizhi Tongjian states that Zhang Tong (張統) of Liaodong, Wang Zun (王遵) of Lelang and over one thousand households decided to break away from Jin and submit to the Xianbei warlord of Former Yan Murong Hui. Murong Hui relocated the remnants of the commandery to the west within Liaodong.

=== Goguryeo ===
In 313, the territory of Lelang was annexed by Goguryeo under King Micheon, ending China's rule over the northern part of the Korean peninsula after the fall of Old Chosŏn. With the collapse of the commanderies after four centuries of Chinese rule, Goguryeo and the native Korean polities in the south that became Paekche, Kaya, and Silla began to grow and develop rapidly, heavily influenced by the cultural impact left by the Four Commanderies of Han.

Goguryeo absorbed much of what was left of Lelang through its infrastructure, economy, local inhabitants, and advanced culture. Unable to govern the region directly and form a new political center immediately, Goguryeo began to consolidate authority by replacing previous government administrators with its own appointed officials, many of whom were refugees and exiles from China, the most famous being Dong Shou (冬壽) who was entombed at Anak Tomb No. 3, overtly retaining the previous administrative system of Lelang. In 334 Goguryeo established the fortress and city of Pyongyang-song within the center of the former commandery.

The nature of Dong Shou's relationship to Goguryeo is disputed. According to one side, Dong Shou was an émigré official subservient to Goguryeo. However this is disputed by Minku Kim, who notes that the textual evidence of Goguryeo's conquest of Daifang Commandery, which was listed as one of Dong Shou's territories, rests on a single line that King Micheon attacked it in 314. Later events during Dong Shou's life point to a weakening of Goguryeo's control. Micheon's tomb was ransacked by Murong Huang's invasion of Goguryeo and his corpse was taken back to Former Yan as ransom. In 355, Former Yan enfeoffed the Goguryeo king as a duke of Lelang, which is the same tier of title attributed to Dong Shou in his epitaph. Furthermore, the epitaph uses the defunct Eastern Jin dynasty's regnal date (Yonghe) rather than Goguryeo's. Accordingly, Kim argues that Dong Shou ruled the region autonomously independently of Goguryeo.

Towards the end of the 4th century, in order to focus on the growing threat of Paekche and having checked the power of Former Yan in Liaodong, Goguryeo began to actively strengthen and govern the city. In 427 Goguryeo moved its capital to Pyongyang from its former capital of Gungnae as the new political center of the kingdom in order to administer its territories more effectively.

== Wang clan ==
The Wang clan was particularly prominent in Lelang. According to the Book of Later Han, Book of Wei, and Book of Zhou, Wang Jing hailed from Danhan county near Lelang. He was descended from the family of Wang Zhong, who were originally from Shandong. They fled to Pyongyang around 180 BCE due to political turmoil. Wang Jing's father was given an official position during the Wang Mang Interregnum and Wang Jing became a member of the Lelang elite due to cooperating with Han bureaucrats.

In 25 CE, Wang Tiao, a Chinese born in Lelang, seized power in Lelang and killed the governor. Han government trooops restored direct control over Lelang in 30 CE. After Wang Tiao, another clan named Han seems to have become just as prominent as the Wang as mentions of them increased, but this may have been due to a shift in power south to Daifang Commandery. The Wang clan remained influential for some time until its final fall with the incorporation of Daifang Commandery into Goguryeo in the fourth and fifth centuries CE.

Inscriptions on lacquer and gold objects bearing the name "Wang" are among the earliest instances of Hanja found in Korea. The Book of Later Han mentions a certain "Wang" whose forefathers hailed from Lelang in the records of Emperor Guangwu of Han (r. 25-57). Wang Cun was the taishou of Lelang during the reign of Guangwu. The name "Wang" has been found on numerous pieces of lacquerware, seals, and bricks from the wealthiest graves in Lelang. The tombs of Wang Xu and Wang Guang are among the Lelang tombs that have survived intact and free from the hands of looters. The grave of a certain "Wang Qing" is also mentioned on brick inscriptions. He was buried in Hwanghae and was chief of Changcen county at the site of Ponghwang-ni. Seven brick inscriptions bearing the name "Wang" have been found dating from the third century CE to early 5th century CE.

Within five multi-chambered Lelang graves, there were 14 seals, 9 of which belonged to the Wang family. The five other seals each represented a different name - Han, Jing, Huang, Meng, and Gao - but only the names of Wang and Gao are identified as holding bureaucratic positions between the first century BCE and second century CE.

== Location ==
=== Textual sources ===
According to Andrew Logie, contemporary sources, pre-20th century tradition, Japanese colonial scholarship, and modern academic consensus all locate the seat of the Lelang Commandery, Chaoxian (kr. Chosŏn), around modern Pyongyang. The capital of Wiman Chosŏn, Wanghŏm, is also believed to be in the same location.

The earliest sources on the Lelang Commandery are the Shiji (2nd to 1st centuries BC) and the Book of Han (111 AD). In their accounts of Chosŏn, the Han army attacked their capital by land from Liaodong (modern central and eastern Liaoning) and by sea from Shandong (Qi). Revisionist historians believe Wanghŏm was in modern Liaoning and argue that "ancient Liaodong" was further west. However, Logie notes that Liaodong Commandery did not exist in isolation and was connected to other administrative commanderies and districts in such a way that shifting Liaodong further west would have a knock-on effect of the broader historical geography of China. The 3rd century AD Records of the Three Kingdoms explicitly describes the Samhan as being located to the south of Daifang, the southern portion of Lelang. It also describes Eastern Okjeo being located to the east of Goguryeo's Kaema Mountain with the Yilou tribes and Buyeo to the north. Furthermore, Okjeo was east of the Tandan Mountains and formed the eastern section of Lelang. Revisionists argue that Kaema and Tandan were located in Liaodong, but archaeological evidence from tombs and fortresses all confirm Goguryeo's position in southern Manchuria and northern Korea. Thus Okjeo must have been located along the eastern coastline of northern Korea in modern Hamgyong Province, matching the location of Lelang in Pyongyang by virtue of being to its east.

After the fall of Lelang, names previously associated with it were repurposed for other locations. The Shiji jijie (c. 425), a commentary on the Shiji, states that Wanghŏm was associated with Xiandu County, located in western Liaoning. However, Logie suggests that this was a speculative match based on the characters for xian (險) and hŏm (儉), both of which were likely used to represent the phonetics of a non-Chinese toponym. The Book of Wei (c. 554) and Book of Jin (c. 646) use names previously associated with Lelang in reference to other locations. TheBook of Wei (c. 554) states that Chaoxian County belonged to Beiping Commandery and that originally Chaoxian was subordinate to Lelang. With the end of Lelang, Chaoxian was re-established in Feiru by people from Chaoxian and according to the Shiji and Book of Han, Feiru was a subordinate county of Liaoxi Commandery (modern western Liaoning). Other Chinese sources continued to equate the location of Lelang Commandery with Pyongyang (Goguryeo's capital), including the Commentary on the Water Classic (early 6th century), Kuodi Zhi (7th century), Old Book of Tang (10th century), and Xuanhe fengshi Gaoli tujing (12th century).

A statement by Sima Zhen (656-720) on the location of Great Wall of the Qin dynasty and Suicheng County of Lelang Commandery has been used as evidence for the position of Lelang by both revisionists and orthodox historians. According to Sima, the Qin Great Wall and Suicheng County were located in the same place. Mount Jieshi in Hebei was seen as an immovable anchor point relative to the location of these places, which revisionists argue meant that they should be located further west. The same logic has been applied by Chinese and Japanese scholars to argue for a location further east. The mainstream South Korean academic community considers the relevant records, which are ultimately based on a commentary on the Shiji by Sima Zhen quoting the Taikang dili zhi, to be erroneous.

Like North Korean scholars, revisionists in South Korea argue that according to the Samguk Sagi (1145), an independent Nangnang (Lelang) Kingdom governed by a king named Choi Ri existed independently of Lelang Commandery, which was situated in Liaodong. This is rejected by most scholars, but Tay Jeong notes that there is no unanimously agreed upon explanation for the existence of this record.

The History of Liao (1344) states that both Pyongyang and Lelang were in Liaoyang. According to Logie, the History of Liao conflates historical commanderies with later locations bearing their name. Geographical entries for the area around modern Liaoyang contains historical toponyms associated with eastern Manchuria and Korea. This was caused by the relocation of people such as the Parhae and Goryeo prisoners taken in the Goryeo-Khitan War from 1010-1018. As a consequence, the historical geography pertaining to Parhae and Liaoyang are blended together. It has also been argued that the Khitan-led Liao dynasty sought to portray themselves as inheritors of Parhae and Goguryeo, which incentivized them to claim Pyongyang and locate Wanghŏm in Liaoyang. These place associations carried over to the Qing dynasty and were included in the Liaoning gazetteer Shengjing tongzhi (1684) and the officially commissioned Researches on Manchu Origins (1783). These two sources and the introduction of the Shengjing tongzhi to the Joseon court in 1697 became a cornerstone of revisionist conceptualizations.

=== Archaeology ===
During the Japanese colonial era, a walled site on the southern bank of the Taedong River in Pyongyang was discovered with seals and roof tiles bearing the name "Lelang". Some objects like clay seals, lacquerware, and eaves tiles bore names from the Book of Han and Book of the Later Han. Both North and South Korean revisionists have doubted their authenticity as pieces of evidence produced by the Japanese Empire. Oh Youngchan states that while it is impossible that Japanese archaeologists forged these artifacts, they may have been counterfeited by private merchants. Korean revisionist scholars characterize the Chinese style tombs surrounding the walled site as indigenous developments in Old Chosŏn. However, even North Korean scholarship has produced archaeological evidence supporting Lelang's placement in Pyongyang. Starting in 2006, North Korean scholars gradually published the discovery of wooden tablets unearthed in the early 1990s recording a population census of Lelang Commandery. This has also elicited skepticism from Korean revisionists who doubt the origin of the tablets and their written content. Despite the forgery claims, the majority of excavated artifacts from the colonial era are preserved and displayed in the Nangnang Gallery of Seoul National Museum.

While evidence of Lelang Commandery has been identified through archaeology, there is no archaeological evidence associated with pre-Lelang Wanghŏm, the capital of Old Chosŏn and Wiman Chosŏn. The absence of evidence has led to theories that it was located to the northwest of Pyongyang. Lelang specialist Chŏng Insŏng is one notable proponent of this theory and his work has been used by revisionists to challenge the placement of both Lelang and Wiman Chosŏn in Pyongyang. This position is not shared by Chŏng, who maintains on archaeological grounds that Lelang was located in Pyongyang. One problem and implication of the placement of Wanghŏm outside Korea is that there is no other evidence, whether textual or archaeological, of the existence of Chosŏn's capital, severing any link between the Korean Peninsula and Old Chosŏn aside from the Tan'gun and Kija traditions.

A couple of South Korean historians argue that Lelang was pushed back to Liaodong by the 2nd century AD based on a 2nd-3rd century AD dating of several stone mounds with Goguryeo characteristics.

A seal with the inscription "Lintun taishou zhang" was excavated in Huludao in 1997, lending archaeological support for possible ties between Liaodong and the Four Commanderies (through Lintun Commandery).

== Historical revisionism ==
=== Joseon ===
Following the Qing invasion of Joseon (1636-1637), Hyojong of Joseon lived as a hostage for seven years in Mukden (Shenyang). He planned an invasion of the Qing dynasty called Bukbeol (Korean: 북벌; Hanja: 北伐; lit. 'northern expedition') during his ten years on the Joseon throne, though the plan died with his death on the eve of the expedition. The northern expedition spurred a rising concern with the northern territory among Joseon literati. The location of the Four Commanderies of Han became politicized and was tied to support for or against the northern expedition. Scholars who argued against the northern expedition situated all Four Commanderies within the Korean Peninsula while those who argued for the expedition situated them outside the peninsula but still within the former territory of Old Chosŏn. This framework of the Four Commanderies as both outside the Korean Peninsula but within Old Chosŏn's former territory lent support to a possible invasion of Manchuria and Liaodong (Yodong) by justifying it as recovering the lost lands of Old Chosŏn. A nostalgia grew for these lands covering Manchuria and Liaodong as part of Old Chosŏn.

The view that the location of the Four Commanderies and Old Chosŏn were both centered around the northwestern Korean Peninsula in modern Pyongyang is exemplified by the writing of the Silhak scholar Chŏng Yagyong (1762 – 1836). This "peninsular view" of the Four Commanderies and Old Chosŏn was widely embraced by Joseon's Neo-Confucian literati. According to Andrew Logie, the identification of Lelang with Pyongyang was an uncontroversial orthodox position in Korea until the start of the 20th century. Other views, however, also existed. One writer proposed that the Lelang Commandery covered both northwestern Korea and Liaodong. Pak Chiwŏn, an 18th century Silhak scholar, claimed that the Four Commanderies were in Liaodong and that "Korean territory was shrunk without anyone lifting a finger to preserve it". He condemned other Korean scholars for not taking a more expansive view of the territory of ancient Korean polities such as Old Chosŏn.

=== Colonial period ===
During the period of Japanese colonial rule (1910–1945), Japanese scholarship firmly placed the location of the Lelang Commandery in Pyongyang. Some Japanese scholars such as Nishikawa Ken and Ōhara Toshitake suggested that Lelang encompassed both Liaodong and northwestern Korea. In response to the crisis of annexation, a generation of Korean revisionist historians sought to build a nativist Korean identity by separating it from Chinese influence. Part of this effort was to argue that the periods of Chinese rule - Kija, Wiman, Four Commanderies - all occurred only on the far western end of Old Chosŏn's territory in Liaodong/Hebei where Wanghŏm, supposedly the second capital, was located. These "resistance historians" such as Sin Ch'aeho (1880–1936) strongly opposed the identification of Lelang with Pyongyang and placed Lelang as well as the other Han Commanderies in Liaodong instead of northwestern Korea. Jeong Inbo (1893-195), another influential resistance historian, questioned the Japanese archaeological findings and also placed Lelang in Liaodong and Liaoxi. These works by a handful of resistance scholars became the origins of alternative historiographies after Korea regained independence.

Elements of these revisionist histories were adopted by the post-colonial nationalist historiographies in North Korea and South Korea. The most extreme exaggerations were rejected in professional academia but continued to live on among civil associations who introduced a polemic to defame the academic establishment as peddlers of Japanese colonial scholarship.

=== Modern ===
==== North Korea ====
Immediately after the Democratic People's Republic of Korea was established in 1948, North Korean archaeologists began arguing that Lelang was never situated in the Korean Peninsula. According to Yŏng-ho Ch'oe writing in 1980, up until the North Korean challenge, it was universally accepted that Lelang was a commandery established by Emperor Wu of Han after he defeated Old Chosŏn in 108 BCE. However, the North Korean academic community and some parts of the South Korean academic community now deny that the Han dynasty had ever ruled northern Korea. Proponents of this revisionist theory claim that the Lelang Commandery actually existed somewhere on the Liaodong Peninsula instead. North Korean academia states that the traditional view of Lelang was promoted by Chinese chauvinists and Japanese imperialists and that there were actually two Lelangs. According to this claim, the Han dynasty only administered the Lelang Commandery on the Liao River in Liaodong, while Pyongyang was an "independent Korean state" also named Lelang (Nangnang Kingdom), which existed between the 2nd century BCE until the 3rd century CE.

In 1949, Hong Ki-mun rejected the majority of Japanese archaeological findings on Lelang around Pyongyang as forgeries in his article "A Review of Japanese Colonial Theories on Korean Archaeology". Part of the impetus for this rejection was due to Japanese colonial research on Lelang and their insistence that the Chinese commandery had a major impact on Korean culture, which lent support to colonial theories of Korea's dependence on China. Certain excavated artifacts such as clay seals, lacquerware, and eaves tale contained inscriptions of names found in the Book of Han and Book of the Later Han. For artifacts that bear undeniable similarities to those found in Han China, they propose that they were introduced through trade and international contact, or were forgeries, and "should not by any means be construed as a basis to deny the Korean characteristics of the artifacts" found in Pyongyang. Despite claims of mass forgery, the majority of archaeological artifacts excavated during the colonial era have been preserved and are now kept in the Nangnang Gallery of Seoul National Museum, which Hyung Il Pai cites as evidence that they are not forgeries. Han dynasty tombs in the area around Pyongyang were reinterpreted by North Korean scholars as the remains of Old Chosŏn or Goguryeo while excavations since the end of World War II have likewise been interpreted as the remains of Old Chosŏn or Goguryeo.

Some North Korean archaeologists fought against the revisionism in the late 1950s and early 1960s and placed Lelang Commandery in modern Pyongyang. An early North Korean scholar, Lim Keonsang, offered an intermediate solution, arguing that Lelang was originally situated in Liaoxi but later relocated to modern Pyongyang in 44 AD when Emperor Guangwu of Han conquered the area (according to the Samguk sagi). Anti-revisionist voices were drowned out in a series of debates. In 1963, Lee Chirin published his seminal work Kojosŏn yŏn'gu (Research on Old Chosŏn) after returning from China to North Korea. He placed Lelang in southwestern Liaodong based on the argument that the locations of places in antiquity were different from their current locations. Kang In-Uk suggests that Lee was instated as a figurehead for North Korean historians against the archaeologists, many of whom continued to support placing Lelang in Pyongyang. Lee's works proved to be highly influential and probably influenced the later Yoon Nahe-hyun, who contributed significantly to the spread of revisionist views in South Korea during the 1970s.

These hypotheses are considered authoritative in the North Korean academic community, with support by some historians in South Korea, but are not recognized in the academic circles of the United States, China and Japan. (Note: United States Congress (2016). North Korea: A Country Study. Nova Science Publishers. p. 6. ISBN 978-1590334430.; "Han Chinese built four commanderies, or local military units, to rule the peninsula as far south as the Han River, with a core area at Lolang (Nangnang in Korean), near present-day P'yongyang. It is illustrative of the relentlessly different historiography practiced in North Korea and South Korea, as well as both countries' dubious projection backward of Korean nationalism, that North Korean historians denied that the Lolang district was centered in Korea and placed it northwest of the peninsula, possibly near Beijing.": Connor, Edgar V. (2003). Korea: Current Issues and Historical Background. Nova Science Publishers. p. 112. ISBN 978-1590334430.; "They place it northwest of the peninsula, possibly near Beijing, in order to de- emphasize China's influence on ancient Korean history.": Kim, Jinwung (2012). A History of Korea: From "Land of the Morning Calm" to States in Conflict. Indiana University Press. p. 18. ISBN 978-0253000248.; "Immediately after destroying Wiman Chosŏn, the Han empire established administrative units to rule large territories in the northern Korean peninsula and southern Manchuria.": Hyung, Hyung Il (2000). Constructing "Korean" Origins. Harvard University Press. p. 128. ISBN 9780674002449.; "At present, the site of Lelang and surrounding ancient Han Chinese remains are situated in the North Korean capital of Pyongyang. Although North Korean scholars have continued to excavate Han dynasty tombs in the postwar period, they have interpreted them as manifestations of the Kochoson or the Koguryo kingdom.": Lee, Peter H. (1993). Sourcebook of Korean Civilization. Columbia University Press. p. 227. ISBN 978-0231079129.; "But when Emperor Wu conquered Choson, all the small barbarian tribes in the northeastern region were incorporated into the established Han commanderies because of the overwhelming military might of Han China.") Despite the North Korean academia's official views on Lelang, starting in 2006, they gradually published the discovery of wooden tablets unearthed in the early 1990s that contained the records of a population census in Lelang Commandery, lending further support to the placement of Lelang in Pyongyang.

==== South Korea ====
In the 1980s, some South Korean scholars started advocating for a Manchuria-centric geographical location for both Old Chosŏn and the Four Commanderies of Han. In 1985 and 1986, South Korean historian Yoon Nae-Hyun published works arguing that the territory of Old Chosŏn reached as far west as Hebei to the north of Beijing. He also denied the existence of the Four Commanderies in the Korean Peninsual and claimed that no archaeological evidence existed to substantiate them.

Influenced by these theories, some popular historians in South Korea have challenged mainstream historical research with far reaching effects. Lee Deok-il, who leads the Hangaram History and Culture Institute in Seoul, took issue with a book written by Mark Byington in 2013 as part of the "Harvard Early Korea Project" backed by South Korean state institutions. The book, titled The Han Commanderies in Early Korean History, held the view that Lelang Commandery was located in Pyongyang. However, Lee argued that this was colonial Japan's view of history. Lee also claimed that one of the project's supporting institutions, the Northeast Asian History Foundation (NAHF), was working on historical maps that looked just like China's ancient maps.

During 2014-2015, the political influence of popular pseudohistory culminated in the formation of a cross-party group of national assemblymen named the "Special Committee for Counter Policies Concerning Distortions in Northeast Asian History". They held a series of meetings targeting the state funded NAHF and accused the organization of financially supporting projects that continued colonialist historiography that disadvantaged Korea in disputes with China. Popular history writer Yi Tŏgil was among the most vocal of the critics brought forth during the hearings and published two books to support the polemics of the accusations. These sessions resulted in the cancellation of both the NAHF-funded Early Korea Project and a digital historical atlas project in South Korea.

In 2014, the Early Korea Project, which received funding from the South Korean government for the purpose of spreading awareness of ancient Korean history in the English speaking world, was suspended due to allegations that it leaned too heavily into Japanese colonial and Chinese research to the exclusion of revisionist views. In 2016, the Early Korea Project lost 4.5 billion Korean Won in funding from the South Korean government over a history map project due to political pressure from culture minister nominee Do Jong-hwan and several other lawmakers. Byington noted that pseudohistorians such as Lee Jong-chan and Lee Deok-il enjoyed open government support during Do's term as culture minister. Do argued that "those with a proper national consciousness should become the mainstream of our society". Lee Jong-chan's Liberation Association espoused similar views, calling for a "broader and more ambitious ancient history". The Korean Society of Ancient Studies criticized Do's stance and in response, Lee Deok-il accused them of forming a "colonial historiography cartel". The incident drew the attention of mainstream historians, who began organizing academic conferences and lectures condemning their pseudohistorian counterparts. The South Korean history journal Yŏksabip’yŏng dedicated a section in three of its four annual volumes in 2016 to denouncing the "pseudohistory" in Korean historical studies. The Early Korea Project was terminated in 2018.

From 2016-2017, a new generation of historians authored a series of articles and columns explicitly denouncing the prior revisionist history as "pseudohistory" (saibi yŏksa). In 2018, Tay Jeong noted that despite causing vitriolic debates, the location of Lelang in Pyongyang remains almost completely uncontested within mainstream South Korean academia owing to the ample amount of evidence. Proposals of half-way locations by certain Japanese, North Korean, and Western scholars such as Gary Ledyard, who suggested that Lelang may have originally been located in Liaodong but later moved to Pyongyang, have also been rejected by orthodox historians. The revisionist tradition of Korean historical scholarship produced many methodologically poor works, and their political challenges have often set back meaningful historical research. As a result, discussion of these perspectives rarely go beyond labeling them as nationalistic or irredentist in nature, although Jeong argues that such monolithic characterizations have also hindered a broader understanding of the historical geography involved.

In 2019, Andrew Logie, a researcher of pseudo historiography in Korea and northern East Asia, leveled several criticisms against a previously unknown and unaffiliated South Korean scholar, Tay Jeong, and his 2018 work, "The Politics of Historical Knowledge: The Debate on the Historical Geography of Old Chosŏn and Lelang Commandery". Logie accused Jeong of feigning impartiality, trying to legitimize a debate over Old Chosŏn and Lelang Commandery, and spreading a narrative of "convergence" between mainstream academia and pseudohistory by conflating professional discourse with revisionist assertions that the Four Commanderies were located outside the Korean Peninsula. Jeong's avoidance of discussing Korean pseudohistory and his characterization of their proponents as rational actors were described by Logie as "highly distorting to uninformed readers". Jeong's English article was published simultaneously with a Korean language article, in which he more explicitly takes the side of the pseudohistorians by arguing against their critics. This tactic served to "provide support by way of international legitimization to pseudohistorians" when said pseudohistorians were being challenged in the political sphere in South Korea.

Jeong adopted a strategy of constant juxtaposition between opposing arguments, which leaves the reader in a state where fallacies illicit no meaningful repercussions. This "insistent impartialism" is similar to the rhetorical strategy of "bothsidesism" employed in political commentary to create a false equivalence between two sides of a debate. As such, Logie states that Jeong's real motive is to portray the two sides of the debate as equally valid while putting the weight of evidence in favor of the pseudohistory camp.

Logie points out that Jeong calls populist pseudohistorians "heterodox" and does not acknowledge their motivations in seeking a different location for Lelang, which is to foster a sense of nationalism and to expunge from Korea notions of attachment to China in a politico-cultural sense. This is the "motivation for arguing for Liaoning/Hebei locations of the Old Chosŏn territory and Lelang Commandery", and still remains true into the present day.

== Maps ==
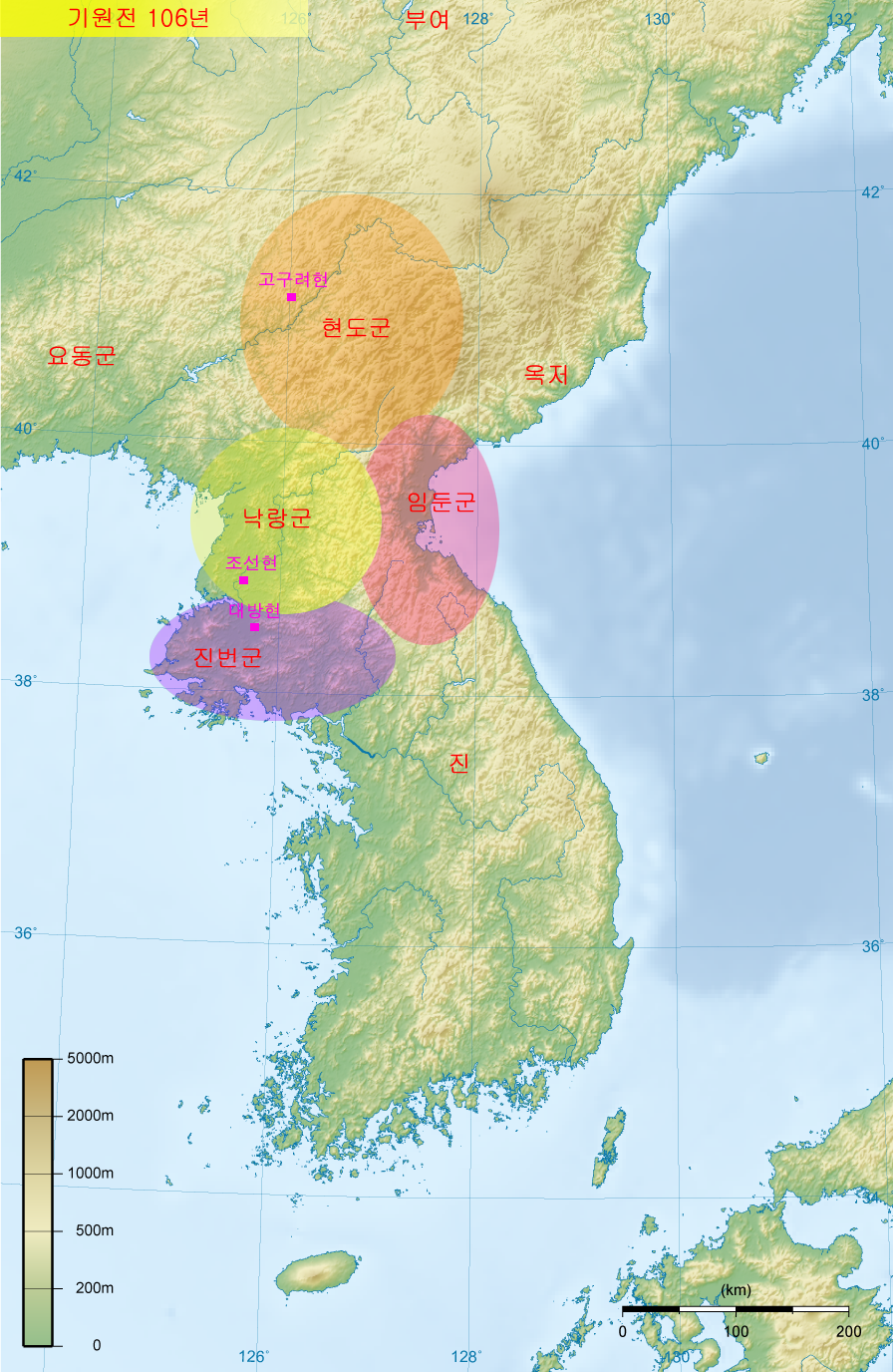
Four Commanderies of Han with Jin in 106 BCE

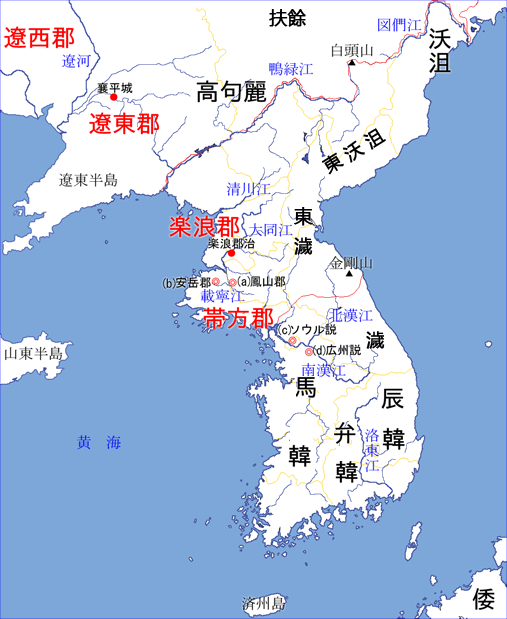
Four Commanderies of Han in 3 CE

== See also ==
- Daifang Commandery
- Canghai Commandery
- Nakrang Kingdom
- Protectorate General to Pacify the East

== Bibliography ==
- Barnes, Gina L. (2001), State Formation in Korea: Historical and Archaeological Perspectives, Routledge
- Jeong, Tay (2018), "The Politics of Historical Knowledge: The Debate on the Historical Geography of Old Chosŏn and Lelang Commandery", Journal of Asian History, 50 (1)
- Kim, Minku (2020), Early Paintings of Korea, Wiley Blackwell
- Logie, Andrew (2019), "The Politics of Feigned Impartiality: A Critical Response to "The Politics of Historical Knowledge"", Journal of Asian History, 53 (1)
- Pai, Hyung Il (2000), Constructing "Korean" Origins: A Critical Review of Archaeology, Historiography, and Racial Myth in Korean State-Formation Theories\publisher=Harvard University Asia Center
