= Daifang Commandery =

Historic commandery of China

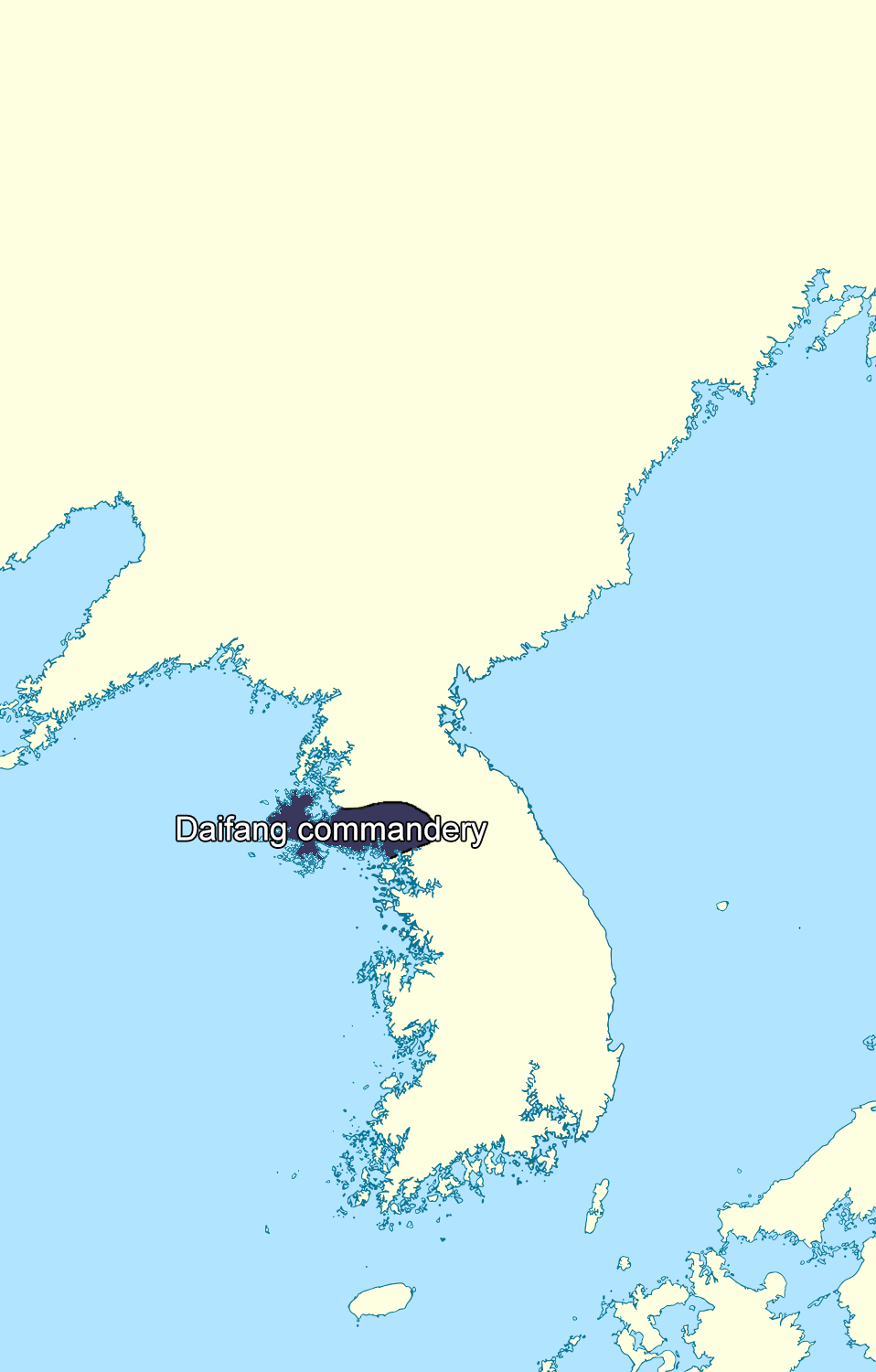
- Daifang Commandery in the early 4th century.

Chinese name
- Traditional Chinese: 帶方郡
Transcriptions
Standard Mandarin
- Hanyu Pinyin: dài fāng jūn
- Wade–Giles: Tai-fang-chün

Korean name
- Hangul: 대방군
- Hanja: 帶方郡
Transcriptions
- Revised Romanization: Daebang-gun
- McCune–Reischauer: Taepang-kun

The Daifang Commandery was an administrative division established by the Chinese Han dynasty on the Korean Peninsula between 204 and 220 CE. It was conquered by Goguryeo in 314 CE.

== History ==
Gongsun Kang, a warlord in Liaodong, separated the southern half from the Lelang Commandery and established the Daifang Commandery sometime between 204 and 220 CE to make administration more efficient. He controlled southern natives with Daifang instead of Lelang.

In 238 CE, under the order of Emperor Ming of Cao Wei, Sima Yi defeated the Gongsun family and annexed Liaodong, Lelang and Daifang to Wei. A dispute over the control of southern natives caused their revolt. The armies of Lelang and Daifang eventually stifled it.

Daifang Commandery was inherited by the Jin dynasty. Due to the bitter civil War of the Eight Princes, Jin became unable to control the Korean peninsula at the beginning of the 4th century. Zhang Tong (張統) broke away from Jin in Lelang and Daifang. After Luoyang, the capital of Jin, was occupied by the Xiongnu in 311, he went for help to Murong Hui, a Xianbei warlord, with his subjects in 314. Goguryeo under King Micheon annexed Lelang and Daifang soon after that.

== Area ==
Map illustrating the path from the Daifeng Commandery to Yamatai, and its distances in the Wajinden.

The Daifang Commandery was located around Hwanghae and its capital was Daifang County. However, the controversy over its location is not resolved yet. According to a Chinese official chronicle, the Book of Jin (晉書), it had the following seven counties (縣, xian):

- Daifang (帶方)
- Liekou (列口)
- Nanxin (南新)
- Changcen (長岑)
- Tixi (提奚)
- Hanzi (含資)
- Haiming (海冥)

== Maps ==
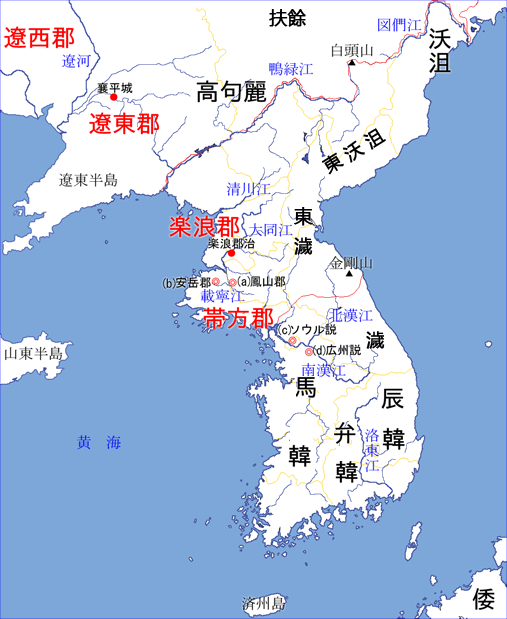
Daifang Commandery in 3 CE

== See also ==
- Xuantu Commandery
- Lelang Commandery
- Zhenfan Commandery
- Lintun Commandery
- Canghai Commandery
- Three Kingdoms
- Records of Three Kingdoms

== Bibliography ==
- Barnes, Gina L. (2001), State Formation in Korea: Historical and Archaeological Perspectives, Routledge
- de Crespigny, Rafe (2007), A Biographical Dictionary of Later Han to the Three Kingdoms, Brill
- Nahm, Andrew C. (1988). Korea: Tradition and Transformation - A History of the Korean People. Elizabeth, NJ: Hollym International.
