= List of Kija Chosŏn monarchs =

Kija Chosŏn (12th century BC–2nd century BC) is the name of an ancient, semi-legendary Korean kingdom. The narrative of the Gojoseon dynasty that this list describes, has been challenged by scholars in the 20th century.

After the semi-legendary rulers of Dangun and Kija (Jizi in Chinese), Bu of Gojoseon and his son Jun of Gojoseon are attested as the first verified recorded local ruler of Korea. King Jun was overthrown however by Wiman of Gojoseon, a Chinese General from the Yan Kingdom (Han dynasty) who established short-lived dynasty. Wiman's grandson, Ugeo of Gojoseon, would be Gojoseon's last ruler, as Gojoseon was conquered by the Han dynasty in 108 BC.

Kija Chosŏn is not accepted by the Korean academic community. And this list is widely considered to be a fraud made in the 18th century, fabricated by Haengju Ki clan in their genealogy book so that they can claim they are the descendants of Kija. Note that although the last two kings are attested in historical records, their posthumous names are fake.

== Monarchs of Kija Chosŏn ==
#	Portrait	Given Name	Posthumous Name	Period of reign	Comments and legends
1		Kija (箕子)	文聖大王 （문성대왕）	1122BCE－1082BCE	Founder of the Kingdom, said to be a relative to the last king of the Shang dynasty. He made the "Eight Prohibitions". He is said to have installed the Jeongjeonje (井田制), a type of land law. Nominated Wangsugeung (王受兢) (Note: He was described as descendant of Cho Myung, 13th descendant of King Wu of Xia.Cho myung is said to have lived in Pyongyang.) as Sasa (士師), a post that was equivalent of a judge.
2		King Song (松)	莊惠王（장혜왕）	1082BCE – 1057BCE	Said to have founded a jongmyo (宗廟).
3		King Sun (詢)	敬孝王（경효왕）	1057BCE – 1030BCE	
4		King Bak (伯)	恭贞王（공정왕）	1030BCE – 1000BCE	Said to have restructured the classes of officials created the attire of officials (公服).
5		King Ch'un (椿)	文武王（문무왕）	1000BCE – 972BCE	Said to have established different measurement units for sound, length, volume and weight. Established a royal guard of 7000 men. Set the calendar.
6		King Ye (禮)	太原王（태원왕）	972BCE – 968BCE	
7		King Jang (莊)	景昌王（경창왕）	968BCE – 957BCE	
8		King Ch'ak (捉)	兴平王（흥평왕）	957BCE – 943BCE	Created currency.
9		King Jo (調)	哲威王（철위왕）	943BCE – 925BCE	Said to have raised a lot of horses.
10		King Sak (索)	宣惠王（선혜왕）	925BCE – 896BCE	Recommended agricultural activities. Established educational institution called Hyeonyangwon to cultivate wise men skilled in six arts, which were calligraphy, rituals, horse riding, archery, music and mathematics. Installed a Sounding stone for the people to report their complaints.
11		King Sa (師)	谊襄王（의양왕）or 諠讓王（훤양왕）	896BCE – 843BCE	Created burden for the people with construction works.
12		King Yum (炎)	文惠王（문혜왕）	843BCE – 793BCE	Created a law for hunger relief of his subjects. Taught the Five Constant Virtues.
13		King Wul (越)	盛德王（성덕왕）	793BCE – 778BCE	Banned rituals to evil ghosts.
14		King Jik (職)	悼怀王（도회왕）	778BCE – 776BCE	
15		King U (優)	文烈王（문열왕）	776BCE – 761BCE	Made paddles for boats by treating Kamkachal (甘加察) well. Kamkachal was a recluse at the time of employment.
16		King Mok (睦)	昌国王（창국왕）	761BCE – 748BCE	
17		King P'yung (平)	武成王（무성왕）	748BCE – 722BCE	At the time of ascending to the throne, he was too young so his mother ruled as Queen regent. Built a naval army and constructed ships.
18		King Gwul (闕)	贞敬王（정경왕）	722BCE – 703BCE	Hunger relief of his subjects by buying the rice from Qi and Lu with money made from selling iron, copper, seafood and salt.
19		King Hwe (懷)	乐成王（낙성왕）	703BCE – 675BCE	Went around every county,hired great officials and fired incompetent ones. Recommended good things while punishing the bad. Also relieved his subjects' hunger. The King is said to have beheaded the Mudang Yeongwoon (鈴雲), described to be evil.
20		King Jon (存)	孝宗王（효종왕）	675BCE – 658BCE	Established institution called Jeyangwon to relieve the bereaved and orphans. Punished bribery with beheadings. Installed the Baksagwan, which decided important matters regarding state affairs and military. Sent Seonwooik to the state of Qi to learn the political tactics of Duke Huan of Qi. Sent gifts to the tribal leader of Xianbei.
21		King Hyo (孝)	天老王（천효왕）	658BCE – 634BCE	Was seduced by bad official Baekilchong to build a pavilion decorated with precious stone in the mountains. Sent funerary statements for the death of Duke Huan of Qi.
22		King Yang (襄)	修道王（수도왕）	634BCE – 615BCE	Baekilchong was given a huge post in the court, honest officials were fired. Attempted to find the immortals. Assassinated people who tried to assassinate Baekilchong.
23		King Ha (遐)	徽襄王（휘양왕）	615BCE – 594BCE	Killed BaekIlchong. Collected taxes regarding houses and markets.
24		King Ch'am (參)	奉日王（봉일왕）	594BCE – 578BCE	The young king was in house arrest, after his uncle was killed by Gongsunkang.
25		King Geun (勤)	德昌王（덕창왕）	578BCE – 560BCE	Rose to the throne after overthrowing Gongsunkang who was killed. Said to be a good King.
26		King Sak (朔)	寿圣王（수성왕）	560BCE – 519BCE	Said to have received tributes from Ezo(Hokkaido). Installed the Jonhyongwan.
27		King Yö (藜)	英杰王（영걸왕）	519BCE – 503BCE	Killed official Hwang Yi Jang (媓彛長) charged with bribery by boiling him. Conquered land of the Northern barbarians.
28		King Gang (岡)	逸民王（일민왕）or 逸聖王（일성왕）	503BCE – 486BCE	Installed educational institutions to teach them about filial piety, business and Agriculture.
29		King Hon (混)	济世王（제세왕）	486BCE – 465BCE	Banned secretly trading with Qi and Lu.
30		King Pyuk (璧)	清国王（청국왕）or 靖國王（정국왕）	465BCE – 432BCE	Added an institution to the court that gives honest feedback to wrongdoings.
31		King Jing (澄)	导国王（도국왕）	432BCE – 413BCE	A big revolt occurred, where 36 counties were affected. King exiled to Hyolgu (identified as Ganghwado). Capital restored after two years.
32		King Chok (隲)	赫圣王（혁성왕）	413BCE – 385BCE	Sent inspectors to look for wrongdoings in rural areas.
33		King Seup (謵)	和罗王（화라왕）	385BCE – 369BCE	Fought with the state of Yan and won.
34		King Ha (賀)	说文王（설문왕）	369BCE – 361BCE	Installed Bakmungwan to raise wise scholars.Invaded by state of Yan.
35		King Hwa (華)	庆顺王（경순왕）	361BCE – 342BCE	In response to a call for help by the Northern barbarians to help deal with the Invasion of Yan, showed immense success against Yan, taking the fortress of Yan.
36		King Hu (詡)	嘉德王（가덕왕）	342BCE – 315BCE	Attempted an Invasion of Yan, but was discouraged from doing so.
37		King Uk (煜)	三老王（삼로왕）	315BCE – 290BCE	Northern barbarians sent a musician.
38		King Suk (釋)	显文王（현문왕）	290BCE – 251BCE	Selected 200 wise scholars. Plowed the land on his own. Ancestral rites to Dangun.
39		King Yun (潤)	章平王（장평왕）	251BCE – 232BCE	Furious at not sending tributes went to war, but lost.
40		King Bu (否)	宗统王（종통왕）	232BCE – 220BCE	Said to have arrested thieves by hiring people well versed in law.
41		King Jun (準)	哀王（애왕）	220BCE – 195BCE	Said to have helped Gaozu of Han by sending troops to counter against Chu forces.

== See also ==
- List of legendary monarchs of Korea
- Gojoseon
