= Lists of ancient monarchs =

Lists of ancient monarchs are organized by region and peoples, and include rulers recorded in ancient history (3000 BC – 1700 AD) and mythology.

== Southern Europe ==
=== Greeks ===
==== Historical ====
- Lists of rulers of Greece
- List of ancient Greek tyrants
- List of kings of Argos
- Kings of Sparta
- Kings of Macedon
- Attalid dynasty
- List of the kings of Epirus

==== Mythological ====
- List of kings of Argos
- List of kings of Athens

=== Italy ===
- List of Etruscan rulers

==== Romans ====
- List of Roman kings
- List of Roman emperors
- List of Byzantine emperors
- List of Roman client rulers

=== Balkans ===
- List of rulers of Illyria
- List of rulers of Thrace and Dacia
- List of Paionian kings

== Northern Europe ==
- List of rulers of the Huns

=== British Isles ===
- Lists of monarchs in the British Isles
- King of Mann

==== Britain ====
- List of legendary Kings of Britain
- King of the Britons

===== Wales =====
- King of Wales
- List of rulers of Wales
  - List of rulers of Gwynedd
  - List of monarchs of Powys

===== Scotland =====
- List of kings of the Picts
- List of Scottish monarchs

===== England =====
- List of English Monarchs
  - List of kings of Dumnonia
  - List of monarchs of Mercia
  - List of monarchs of Northumbria
  - List of monarchs of Wessex

==== Ireland ====
- List of High Kings of Ireland (largely mythological for ancient times)
- Kings of Ailech
- List of kings of Connacht
- Kings of Uí Maine (semi-historic in ancient times)
- List of kings of Ulster
- List of kings of Leinster
- List of kings of Munster
- List of kings of Meath

=== Germanics ===
- List of Frankish kings
- Kings of the Burgundians
- List of kings of the Lombards
- Kings of the Angles
- List of Anglo-Saxon monarchs and kingdoms

== Northern Africa ==
- Magonids
- List of kings of Numidia
- List of kings of Mauretania
- List of kings of Cyrene

=== Egypt ===
- List of pharaohs
- Abydos King List
- Karnak king list
- Turin King List

=== Nubia ===
- List of monarchs of Kerma
- List of monarchs of Kush

=== Ethiopia ===
- List of kings of Axum
- Regnal lists of Ethiopia
- 1922 regnal list of Ethiopia

== Near East ==
- List of rulers of Saba and Himyar

=== Mesopotamia ===
- List of Mesopotamian dynasties
- Sumerian King List
- List of kings of Akkad
- List of kings of Babylon
- List of Assyrian kings
- List of kings of Mari
- List of rulers of Mitanni

=== Syria and Canaan ===
- List of Canaanite rulers
- List of kings of Ebla
- Kings of Ugarit
- List of rulers of Aleppo
- List of kings of Tyre
- Aramean kings
- List of Syrian monarchs
- List of rulers of Damascus
- List of Nabataean kings
- List of Palmyrene monarchs

==== Jews ====
- Kings of Israel and Judah
- Kings of Judah
- Kings of Hasmonean Judea

=== Anatolia ===
- List of Hittite kings
- List of Neo-Hittite kings
- List of kings of Urartu
- List of Kings of Lydia
- List of Lycian monarchs
- List of rulers of Cappadocia
- List of rulers of Paphlagonia
- List of rulers of Commagene
- List of monarchs of Pontus
- List of rulers of Bithynia
- List of kings of Galatia

=== Caucasus ===
- List of Armenian kings
- List of Georgian monarchs

=== Iran ===
- List of rulers of Pre-Achaemenid kingdoms of Iran
- List of rulers of Elam
- List of kings of Persia
- List of Seleucid rulers
- List of Parthian kings
- List of rulers of Parthian sub-kingdoms
- Kings of Characene
- List of shahanshahs of the Sasanian Empire

== Far East ==
- List of Emperors of Japan
- List of monarchs of Vietnam
- Monarchy of Cambodia
- List of early and legendary monarchs of Burma

=== Indian Subcontinent ===
- List of Indian monarchs
- List of Tamil monarchs
- List of monarchs of Kashmir
- List of monarchs of Magadha
- List of Manipuri kings
- List of rulers of Assam
- List of rulers of Malwa
- List of rulers of Bengal
- List of rulers of Odisha
- Legendary early Chola kings
- List of rulers of Rajasthan
- List of rulers of Mithila
- List of Sri Lankan monarchs
- List of Sinhalese queens
- List of Lunar dynasty kings
- List of Solar dynasty kings
- List of Hindu empires and dynasties

=== China ===
- List of Chinese monarchs
- List of Chinese leaders
- Kings of the Han dynasty
- List of emperors of the Han dynasty
- List of emperors of China's Northern Dynasties
- List of emperors of China's Southern Dynasties
- List of emperors of the Tang dynasty
- List of emperors of the Liao dynasty
- List of emperors of the Ming dynasty
- List of Yuan emperors
- List of Northern Yuan khans
- List of emperors of the Qing dynasty

=== Korea ===
- List of monarchs of Korea
- List of legendary monarchs of Korea (mythological)
- List of Mahan confederacy monarchs (mythological)
- List of Gija Joseon monarchs (mythological)
- List of Wiman Joseon monarchs

== Americas ==
=== Maya ===
- Rulers of Calakmul (no actual king-list; must be dug out of text)
- List of lords of Caracol
- List of rulers of Copan
- List of the rulers of Dos Pilas
- Rulers of Dos Pilas
- Kʼicheʼ kingdom of Qʼumarkaj (no actual king-list; must be dug out of history)
- Rulers of Motul de San José
- Rulers of Palenque
- List of rulers of Piedras Negras
- Rulers of Quiriguá
- Rulers of Tikal
- Yaxchilan rulers

=== Valley of Mexico ===
- List of rulers of Tenochtitlan
- List of rulers of Tetzcoco
- List of rulers of Tlacopan

=== Incas ===
- Rulers of Cusco and the Inca Empire

== See also ==
- List of dynasties
- Lists of monarchs
- Lists of emperors
- List of empires
- List of kingdoms and royal dynasties
- List of current monarchs of sovereign states
