= Olga =

Olga may refer to:

== People and fictional characters ==
- Olga (name), a given name, including a list of people and fictional characters named Olga or Olha
- Michael Algar (born 1962), English singer also known as "Olga"

== Places ==
=== Russia ===
- Olga, Russia, an urban-type settlement in Primorsky Krai
- Olga Bay, a bay of the Sea of Japan in Primorsky Krai
- Olga (river), Primorsky Krai

=== United States ===
- Olga, Florida, an unincorporated community and census-designated place
- Olga, Kentucky, an unincorporated community
- Olga, Missouri, an unincorporated community
- Olga, Washington, an unincorporated community
- Olga Bay, Alaska, a bay on the south end of Kodiak Island
- Olga, a neighborhood of South Pasadena, California

=== Elsewhere ===
- Kata Tjuta, Northern Territory, Australia, also known as the Olgas, a group of domed rock formations
  - Mount Olga, the tallest of these rock formations
- Olga, Greece, a settlement
- 304 Olga, a main belt asteroid

== Arts and entertainment ==
- Olga (opera), a 2006 Brazilian opera about Olga Benário Prestes
- Olga (2004 film), a 2004 Brazilian biopic of Benário
- Olga (2021 film), a Franco-Ukrainian-language Swiss drama
- Olga TV, a British independent television production company
- On-line Guitar Archive, a former online resource for guitar chords and tablature

== Other uses ==
- OLGA (technology), an oil and gas simulator
- List of storms named Olga, the name of several tropical cyclones
- MV Olga, a German coaster in service 1927–59
- Olga (helicopter), an S-64 Skycrane that topped the CN Tower in Toronto
- Olga (horse), an equine recipient of the Dickin Medal
- Führerhauptquartier Olga, an unfinished German World War II bunker facility planned for Hitler's use near Orsha, Soviet Union
- Organisation of Lesbian and Gay Activists, a historical LGBT rights organization in South Africa.

== See also ==
- Oga (disambiguation)
