= Three Confederate States of Gojoseon =

Theorized ancient Korean states

The three Gojoseon kingdoms are states thought to have existed according to Joseon Sangosa (1924–25). The concept gained a following among several fringe historians, although it is not completely accepted by mainstream scholars.

In popular Korean history, drawing on the Korean founding myth, Gojoseon (고조선, 古朝鮮, 2333 BC – 239 BC) was an early state that was established around Liaoning, southern Manchuria, and the northern Korean Peninsula. It was anciently known simply as Joseon, but is now referred to as Gojoseon, i.e. "Ancient Joseon" to distinguish it from the much later (14th century) Kingdom of Joseon.

According to some sources, Gojoseon was a kingdom formed by the union of three confederacies, or Samhan: Makjoseon (막조선, 莫朝鮮), Jinjoseon (진조선, 真朝鮮) and Beonjoseon (번조선, 番朝鮮). These three confederacies are said to be also known as Mahan, Byeonhan, and Jinhan. In conventional Korean history, these three confederacies appeared following Gojoseon's break-up, in the central and southern Korean Peninsula, until they were fully absorbed into the Three Kingdoms of Korea around the 4th century CE. Therefore, these later Samhan must be distinguished from the "former Samhan", or Samjoseon.

== Government structure ==
According to Joseon Sangosa, written in 1924–25 by Sin Chaeho, Korea during the Sudu era(which roughly corresponds to Dangun Joseon) had an organizational system of three states and 5 ministries(Obu,五部). The three states consisted of Jinjoseon, Makjoseon and Beonjoseon. Jinjoseon was said to be ruled by the Supreme Dangun. Beonjoseon and Makjoseon were said to be ruled by two Vice-Danguns. The Five Ministries, or Ohga, included Dotga (pig), Gaega (dog), Soga (cow), Malga (horse) and Shinga according to their areas of east, west, south, north and center. This ministry system using the name of animals was also claimed to be used by Buyeo, which is considered a successor state of Gojoseon by fringe historians (in real life its hard to say it is a successor state as buyeo was coexistent with gojoseon). In wartime, five military troops(오군,五軍) consisting of a central army, an advanced army, a left army and a right army were said to be organized, according to military commands, by the general of the central army. It is said that the traditional Korean game of Yut is patterned after these five military structures (the real origin was based on the system of sachooldo). Generally, the succession system of the Supreme Dangun and the Vice-Dangun was said to be determined by heredity, and sometimes the ruler said to be succeeded by one of the Ohga, suggesting that the sovereign's power was not absolute.

== Jinjoseon (2333 BC – 239 BC) ==
Shin says the prefixes Ma, Jin and Beon were borrowed from Chinese characters to represent the Korean language using the Idu system. Jin (or Shin) represents the meanings of "whole" or "general"; thus Jinjoseon refers to the central confederacy of Gojoseon. Asadal (아사달) was the capital city of Jinjoseon governed by Dangun, and the other two Joseons were governed by the vice Danguns. Joseon Sangosa says that Asadal corresponds to the current Harbin. In history books, Jinjoseon was usually called Jin. Jinjoseon was conquered by Hae Mo-su of Buyeo, and the state name was changed to Buyeo.

== Beonjoseon (2333 BC – 108 BC) ==
Beon or sometimes Byun means a plain or a field. Because Beonjoseon was a neighbor to the Chinese states, Chinese history usually referred to Beonjoseon as Gojoseon or simply Joseon. According to Shin, Gija Joseon and Wiman Joseon were usurpations of Beonjoseon, and the Danguns allowed Gija and Wiman to rule over Beonjoseon because they were of the Dongyi race. Chinese usually referred to the ancestral Korean race as Dong-yi, meaning eastern barbarians. According to Joseon Sangosa, the Gi family became the kings of Beonjoseon in 323 BC, and the central authority of the Vice-Dangun became very powerful. Beonjoseon of the Gi family was usurped by Wiman in 193 BC; it was called Wiman Joseon henceforth. The last Vice-Dangun, Gijun, fled with his nobles and a large number of people into the Korean peninsula. There, he conquered Makjoseon, and established Mahan.

== Makjoseon (2333 BC – ?) ==
Ma is generally used to represent "south", and Makjoseon was located to the south of Jinjoseon. Its capital city was Pyongyang. It is uncertain how long Makjoseon endured, but it is thought to have been conquered by Gijun when he fled from Wiman, and then changed the name of the state to Mahan — one of the confederacies of the later Samhan. It seems that Mahan continued until it was conquered by Baekje.

== Disintegration of Three Gojoseon ==
According to Joseon Sangosa, the disintegration of the three Gojoseon started when people were disillusioned with the religion of the Samjoseon confederation, and decided to establish their own autonomous entities.

== Interpretation ==
=== Misreading ===
Some Korean scholars point out that the basis of the story is from Shin's interpretation of the following line in the chapter "Treatise on Chosun" (朝鮮列傳) section of the Records of the Grand Historian that Shin introduced in his book Chǒnhu Samhan Ko ("A Study of the Three Hans in Sequence", or "An Inquiry into the Former and Latter Three Han States"; 前後三韓考):

自始全燕時嘗略屬眞番朝鮮.

"Zhenfan Commandery and Joseon were already invaded and subjugated in the high days of the Yan."

Since the characters 眞番朝鮮 can be read as Jinbeon and Joseon or Jinjoseon and Beonjoseon, this is thought to be the source of the confusion.

=== Support for the interpretation of Shin's original opinion ===
On the collected annotations (集解) of the same section, Guang Xu (徐廣) who was a historian of Eastern Jin, illustrates that Jinbeon is also called Jinmak (眞莫). In the Biographies of the Wuhuan, Xianbei, and Dongyi in the Book of Wei in the Records of the Three Kingdoms, a following detailed paragraph appears that differentiates Jin (辰) and Beon (蕃) which suggests the two entities were separate.

初, 右渠未破時, 朝鮮相歷谿卿以諫右渠不用, 東之辰國, 時民隨出居者二千餘戶, 亦與朝鮮貢蕃不相往來.

"At earlier times before King Ugeo was demolished, a Joseon official called Yeokgyeyung (歷谿卿) expostulated to the king but after his expostulation was refused he went east to the state of Jin (辰國). At that time there were 2000 houses of people who followed his journey, and they never traded with Beon (蕃) which was a tributary of Joseon."

== Trivia ==
A classification of Three Joseons existed before in the geography section of the Veritable Records of Sejong of the Veritable Records of the Joseon Dynasty where it illustrates the history of Pyongyang in Pyongan Province. But the classification was of Dangun Joseon(Jeonjoseon), Gija Joseon(Hujoseon), and Wiman Joseon.

== See also ==
- Gojoseon
- Samhan
