= Oga =

Oga or OGA may refer to:

== Places ==
- Oga, Akita, Tōhoku, Japan
- Oga Peninsula, Japan
- Oga, a frazione of Valdisotto, Italy

== People ==
- Ōga Atsushi, a Japanese sumo wrestler
- Oga (title), Yoruba, Nigerian Pidgin and Nigerian English term for "boss" or "leader"
- Aragami Oga, a virtual YouTuber affiliated with Hololive Production

== As an acronym and initialism ==
- Office Genuine Advantage in Microsoft Office
- Oil and Gas Authority, regulator of oil and gas operations in the United Kingdom
- Old Gaffers Association
- Open Genealogy Alliance
- OGA, the IATA airport code for Searle Field airport, Ogallala, Nebraska
- Other government agency, an initialism used in certain United States military contexts to refer to the Central Intelligence Agency or other governmental organizations embedded with military units

== Other uses ==
- Oga (Gojoseon), a political structure in the ancient Asian kingdoms of Gojoseon and Buyeo
- .oga, an Ogg file containing audio
- Protein O-GlcNAcase, an enzyme that removes the post-translational modification O-GlcNAc

== See also ==
- Olga (disambiguation)
