= Olginsky District =

Olginsky District Ольгинский район (Russian)
- District
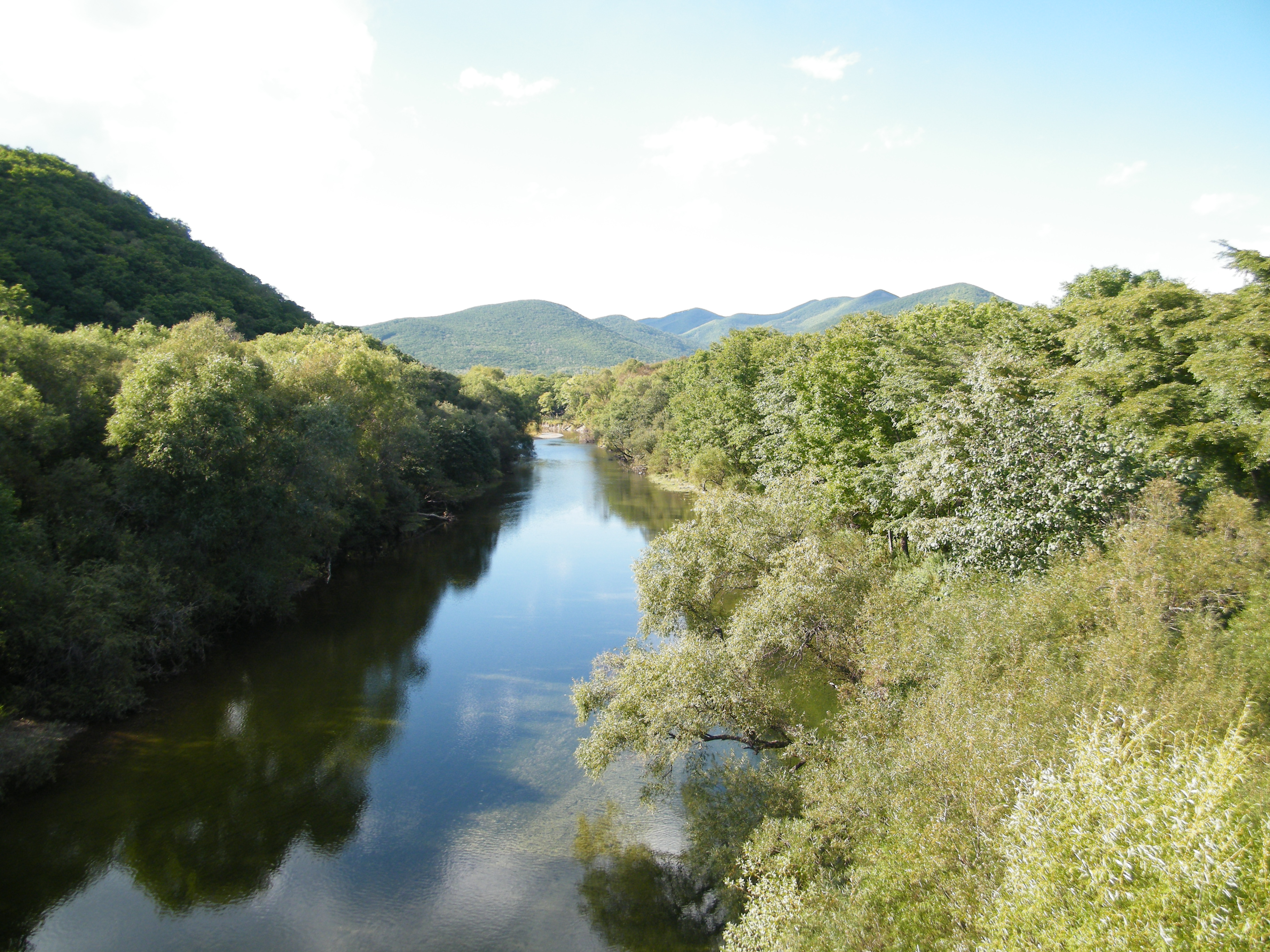
- The Arzamasovka River in Olginsky District

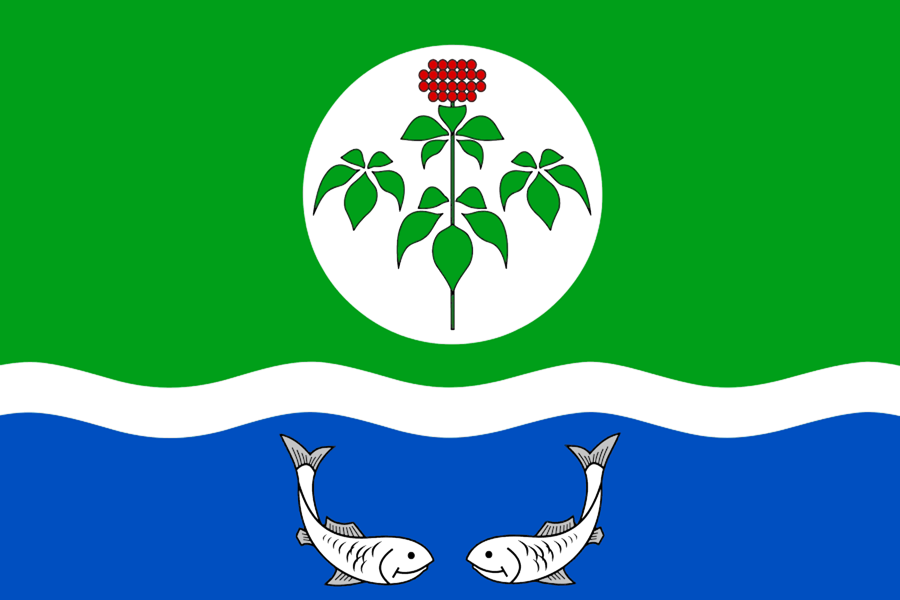
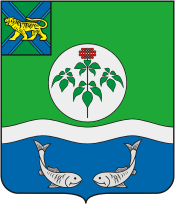
- Flag Coat of arms
- Location of Olginsky District in Primorsky Krai
- Coordinates: 43°42′N 135°18′E
- Country: Russia
- Federal subject: Primorsky Krai
- Established: 1926
- Administrative center: Olga

Area
  - Total: 6,415.9 km^{2} (2,477.2 sq mi)

Population (2010 Census)
  - Total: 10,701
  - Density: 1.6679/km^{2} (4.3198/sq mi)
  - Urban: 37.6%
  - Rural: 62.4%

Administrative structure
  - Inhabited localities: 1 urban-type settlements, 18 rural localities

Municipal structure
  - Municipally incorporated as: Olginsky Municipal District
  - Municipal divisions: 1 urban settlements, 6 rural settlements
- Time zone: UTC+10 (MSK+7)
- OKTMO ID: 05628000
- Website: http://mo.primorsky.ru/olginsky/

Olginsky District (Russian: О́льгинский райо́н) is an administrative and municipal district (raion), one of the twenty-two in Primorsky Krai, Russia. It is located in the southeast of the krai and borders with Kavalerovsky District in the north, the Sea of Japan in the east, southeast, and south, Lazovsky District in the southwest, and with Chuguyevsky District in the west. The area of the district is 6,415.9 square kilometers (2,477.2 sq mi). Its administrative center is the urban locality (an urban-type settlement) of Olga. Population: 10,701 (2010 census); 12,044 (2002 census); 16,006 (1989 Soviet census). The population of Olga accounts for 37.6% of the district's total population.

== Geography ==
Slopes of south Sikhote-Alin and narrow coastline of the Sea of Japan are the most prominent features of the district territory's landscape. The largest bay is the Olga Bay. The highest point is Mount Perevalnaya, at 1,406 meters (4,613 ft).

== History ==
The district was established in 1926 and originally encompassed the territories of modern Lazovsky and Kavalerovsky Districts and the territory presently subordinated to Dalnegorsk Town Under Krai Jurisdiction.

== Notable residents ==
- Valentin Parinov (born 1959), swimmer, born in Olga
- Ivan Stolbovoy (born 1986), football player, born in Olga
