= Monarchist League =

Monarchist League may refer to:

== British Commonwealth ==
- International Monarchist League (known until the mid-1990s as the Monarchist League), founded in 1943 and based in London, England, UK; supporting the monarchy
- Australian Monarchist League, founded in 1943 (affiliated with the IML until 1993); supporting the monarchy
- Monarchist League of Canada, founded in 1970 (unaffiliated with the IML); supporting the monarchy
- Monarchist League of New Zealand, founded in 1995 (unaffiliated with the IML); supporting the monarchy

== Other ==
- Vietnamese Constitutional Monarchist League, founded in 1993, seeking the restoration of the House of Nguyen

== See also ==
- List of monarchist movements by country
- Royal Stuart Society (aka the Royalist League), founded 1928; seeking restoration of the House of Stuart as the ruling house of Great Britain
- Monarchists
- Royalists
