= Olga (river) =

River in Russia

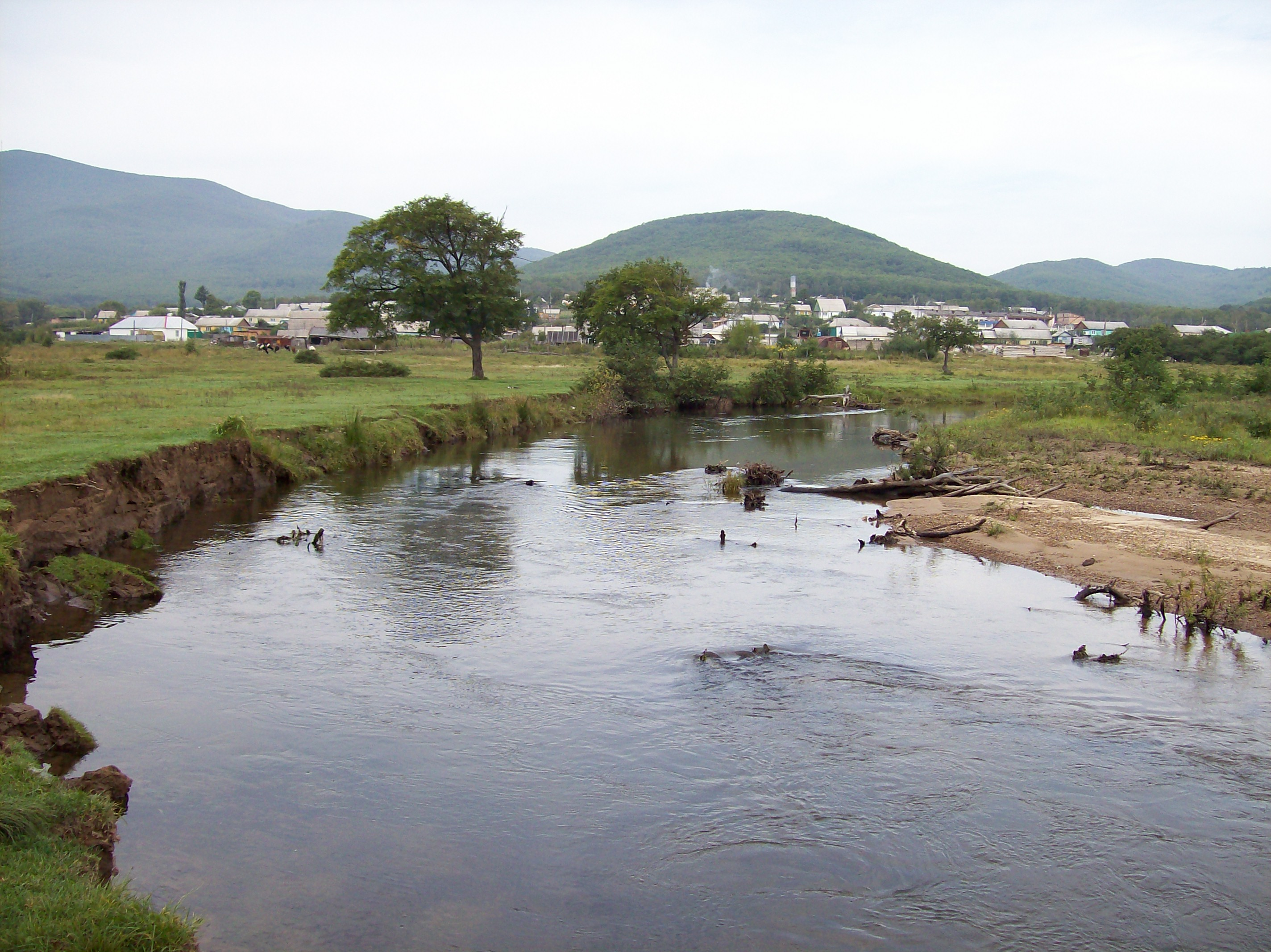

Location
- Country: Russia

Physical characteristics
- Mouth: Sea of Japan
  - location: Olga Bay
  - coordinates: 43°43′53″N 135°17′25″E
- Length: 16 km (9.9 mi)

The Olga (Russian: Ольга) is a river in Olginsky District, Primorsky Krai, Russia. It flows into the Olga Bay of the Sea of Japan. It is 16 kilometres (9.9 mi) long.
