= Naram-Suen =

Naram-Suen or Naram-Sin (Akkadian: 𒈾𒊏𒄠𒀭𒂗𒍪, lit. 'Beloved of Sin') may refer to any of five kings in the history of Mesopotamia:

- Naram-Sin of Akkad (c. 2255–2218 BC), an Akkadian king, the most famous of the five
- Naram-Sin of Assyria (c. 1872–1845 BC), an Assyrian king
- Naram-Sin of Uruk (c. 19th century BC), a king of Uruk
- Naram-Sin of Eshnunna (c. 19th century BC), a king of Eshnunna
- Naram-Sin of Malgium (c. 18th century BC) a ruler of Malgium

== See also ==
- List of lists of ancient kings
