= List of fictitious kings in Korean genealogies =

List of fictional monarchs of Korean genealogies

This is a list of fictional monarchs appearing in the genealogies of three Korean descent groups: the Cheongju Han, the Haengju Gi, and the Taewon Seonu. These groups claim descent from a line of putative kings of Gojoseon and Mahan founded by the legendary Chinese figure Jizi, who is said to have introduced Chinese civilization to Korea. However, the association between Jizi and these clans is considered an Early Modern fabrication. The records of the Goryeo dynasty make no link between Cheongju Han individuals and Jizi, despite the fact that the official veneration of Jizi as a culture hero was patronized by the state. Fifteenth- and sixteenth-century sources also report that the descent group had been founded either by Han Ran(한란,韓蘭), a tenth-century general in the service of Taejo of Goryeo, or by Han Gang(한강,韓康), a thirteenth-century minister in the government of Gojong of Goryeo.

In the case of the Cheongju Han, the creation of the myth appears to have involved the integration of reports from the third-century Chinese history Weilüe, in which King Jun is said to have fled south and proclaimed himself King of "Han" after losing his throne to a Chinese usurper, and the Jewang ungi, a thirteenth-century epic poem in which King Jun is said to have become the king of Mahan. However, the histories never actually state that King Jun was a descendant of Jizi. The genealogies claim that King Jun's descendants ruled Mahan for a while before losing the throne, at which point the last king's three sons scattered to the Three Kingdoms of Korea and founded the Han, Gi, and Seonu.

The first evidence of Koreans claiming descent from Jizi and the Gojoseon kings appears in a Joseon Veritable Records entry for September 1603, when a discussion about Jizi between King Seonjo and his ministers digressed into a discussion on whether Jizi had traceable living descendants. The ministers, such as Yun Kŭnsu, reported that it was said that the Cheongju Han and the Taewon Seonu were descended from Jizi; the king remained skeptical. Surviving writing by Yun Kŭnsu himself suggests considerable personal doubt as to the veracity of the Cheongju Han's claims.

Seonjo's successor, Gwanghaegun, significantly supported the state veneration of Jizi amid an environment in which claiming Chinese descent became increasingly prestigious following Ming China's successful interventions to save Korea during the 1590s Japanese invasions. In particular, the supposed descendants of Jizi were now legally relieved from the military cloth tax(군포,軍布) that Koreans were obliged to pay in place of conscription. As a result, many unrelated descent groups changed their affiliation to those descended from Jizi, with the result that groups such as the Jindo Han clan or the Jinan Han clan vanished. Descent from Jizi became generally accepted in Korean society following the publication of genealogies in the early seventeenth century, although major Korean scholars, in particular of the Silhak strain of practical scholarship, continued to question the connection. Modern Korean historians do not accept the historical validity of the genealogies.

== Gojoseon (Gija joseon) ==
#	Throne name (Hanja/Hangul)	Personal name (Hanja/Hangul)	Period of reign
1	Munseong (文聖大王/문성대왕)	Gija (箕子/기자)	1122(?)–1082 BCE
2	Janghye (莊惠王/장혜왕)	Song (松/송)	1082－1057BCE
3	Gyeonghyo (敬孝王/경효왕)	Sun (詢/순)	1057－1030BCE
4	Gongjeong (恭貞王/공정왕)	Baek (伯/백)	1030－1000BCE
5	Munmu (文武王/문무왕)	Chun (椿/춘)	1000－972BCE
6	Taewon (太原王/태원왕)	Ye (禮/예)	972－968BCE
7	Gyeongchang (景昌王/경창왕)	Jang (莊/장)	968－957BCE
8	Heungpyeong (興平王/흥평왕)	Chak (捉/착)	957－943BCE
9	Cheorwi (哲威/철위왕)	Jo (調/조)	943－925BCE
10	Seonhye (宣惠王/선혜왕)	Sak (索/색)	925－896BCE
11	Uiyang (誼襄王/의양왕)	Sa (師/사)	896－843BCE
12	Munhye (文惠王/문혜왕)	Yeom (炎/염)	843－793BCE
13	Seongdeok (盛德王/성덕왕)	Wol (越/월)	793－778BCE
14	Dohoe (悼懷王/도회왕)	Jik (職/직)	778－776BCE
15	Munyeol (文烈王/문열왕)	U (優/우)	776－761BCE
16	Changguk (昌国王/창국왕)	Mok (睦/목)	761－748BCE
17	Museong (武成王/무성왕)	Pyeong (平/평)	748－722BCE
18	Jeonggyeong (貞敬王/정경왕)	Gwol (闕/궐)	722－703BCE
19	Nakseong of Gojoseon (樂成王/낙성왕)	Hoe (懷/회)	703－675BCE
20	Hyojong (孝宗王/효종왕)	Jon (存/존)	675－658BCE
21	Cheonhyo/Cheollo (天老王/천효왕)	Hyo (孝/효)	658－634BCE
22	Sudo (修道王/수도왕)	Yang (襄/양)	634－615BCE
23	Hwiyang (徽襄王/휘양왕)	Tong (通/통)	615－594BCE
24	Bongil (奉日王/봉일왕)	Cham (參/참)	594－578BCE
25	Deokchang (德昌王/덕창왕)	Geun (僅/근)	578－560BCE
26	Suseong (寿聖王/수성왕)	Sak (朔/삭)	560－519BCE
27	Yeonggeol (英傑王/영걸왕)	Ryeo (藜/려)	519－503BCE
28	Ilmin (逸民王/일민왕)	Gang (岡/강)	503－486BCE
29	Jese (濟世王/제세왕)	Hon (混/혼)	486－465BCE
30	Cheongguk (清国王/청국왕)	Byeok (璧/벽)	465－432BCE
31	Doguk (導国王/도국왕)	Jing (澄/징)	432－413BCE
32	Hyeokseong (赫聖王/혁성왕)	Jun (/준)	413－385BCE
33	Hwara (和羅王/화라왕)	Wi (謂/위)	385－369BCE
34	Seolmun (說文王/설문왕)	Ha (賀/하)	369－361BCE
35	Gyeongsun (慶順王/경순왕)	Hwa (華/화)	361－342BCE
36	Gadeok (嘉德王/가덕왕)	Hu (詡/후)	342－315BCE
37	Samhyo/Samno (三老王/삼효왕)	Uk (煜/욱)	315－290BCE
38	Hyeonmun (顯文王/현문왕)	Seok (釋/석)	290－251BCE
39	Jangpyeong (章平王/장평왕)	Yun (潤/윤)	251－232BCE
40	Bu (宗統王/종통왕); Posthumous Name: Jong Tong (宗統王/종통왕)	Gibu (基否/기부)	232－220BCE
41	Jun (哀王（애왕)	Gijun (基準/기준)	220－195BCE

== Mahan ==
1. 기준 (箕準) or King Mugang 무강왕 武康王 (220–194BCE)
2. 기탁 (箕卓) or King Gang 강왕 康王 (193–189BCE)
3. 기감 (箕龕) or King An 안왕 安王 (189–157BCE)
4. 기식 (箕寔) or King Hye 혜왕 惠王 (157–144BCE)
5. 기무 (箕武) or King Myung 명왕 明王 (144–113BCE)
6. 기형 (箕亨) or King Hyo 효왕 孝王 (113–73BCE)
7. 기섭 (箕燮) or King Yang 양왕 襄王 (73–58BCE)
8. 기훈 (箕勳) or King Won 원왕 元王 (58–32BCE)
9. 기정 (箕貞) or King Gye 계왕 稽王 (32–17BCE)

== See also ==
- List of monarchs of Korea
