= Larix gmelinii var. olgensis =

Olga Bay larch

Conservation status
- Near Threatened (IUCN 3.1)

Scientific classification
- Kingdom: Plantae
- Clade: Tracheophytes
- Clade: Gymnosperms
- Division: Pinophyta
- Class: Pinopsida
- Order: Pinales
- Family: Pinaceae
- Genus: Larix
- Species: L. gmelinii
- Variety: L. g. var. olgensis

Trinomial name
- Larix gmelinii var. olgensis (A.Henry) Ostenf. & Syrach

Synonyms
- Larix amurensis Kolesn. ex Dylis; Larix gmelinii subsp. olgensis (A.Henry) A.E.Murray; Larix lubarskii Sukaczev; Larix olgensis A.Henry; Larix olgensis var. amurensis (Kolesn. ex Dylis) Kitag.

Variety of conifer

Larix gmelinii var. olgensis (OIga Bay Larch)

Larix gmelinii var. olgensis, synonym Larix olgensis, the Olga Bay larch or Olgan larch, is a variety of larch. The variety is named after Olga Bay in the Sea of Japan. The common name in Japanese language is 満洲唐松 (Manshu'u Kara-matsu). The common name in Chinese is 黄花落叶松 (pinyin: huang hua luo ye song). This variety occurs in Central Sikhote-Alin, and rarely occurs in North Korea, and Jilin and eastern Heilongjiang provinces of China, between 500 and 1100 metres in elevation.

This deciduous coniferous tree grows to 25–30 meters tall with a trunk reaching a meter in diameter at breast high, with gray to gray-brown bark with flaking and scaly fissured bark. Its leaves are needle-like, dark-green, 1.5–3 cm long and 1 cm wide. The reddish purple or violet cones mature to light brown, sometimes tinged with purple, and range from 18 to 25 mm long. Pollination occurs in May with seeds maturing in September-October. It grows in mountains and on moist slopes and in swamps. The timber has many uses in construction and for wood fiber. The trunk is used to produce resin while the bark is used for tannins.

== Sources ==
- EN.Jiří Kolbek, Miroslav Šrůtek, Elgene Owen. Forest Vegetation of Northeast Asia. #Larix olgensis p. 196
- RU.Усенко Н. В.. Деревья, кустарники и лианы Дальнего Востока. Хабаровск: Книжное издательство, 1984
