= List of kings of Wiman Chosŏn =

Wiman Chosŏn (194–108 BC) was an ancient Korean dynasty established after Wi Man usurped the throne from Jun of Gojoseon.

#	Portrait	Westernized	Hanja/Hangul	Period of reign
1		King Wiman	衛満 （위만）	194BCE—161BCE
2		Unknown	Unknown	161BCE—129BCE
3		King Ugeo	衛右渠（위우거）	129BCE—108BCE

== See also ==
- Wiman Chosŏn
- List of monarchs of Korea
- Gojoseon
