= List of kingdoms and royal dynasties =

This is a list of kingdoms and royal dynasties, organized by geographic region.

Note: many countries have had multiple dynasties over the course of recorded history. This is not a comprehensively exhaustive list and may require further additions or historical verification.

== Africa ==
=== Algeria ===
- Numidia
- Mauretania Caesariensis
- Vandal Kingdom
- Kingdom of Altava
- Kingdom of the Aurès
- Mauro-Roman Kingdom
- Emirate of Tlemcen
- Rustamid dynasty
- Sulaymanid dynasty
- Zirid Dynasty
- Hammadid dynasty
- Kingdom of Tlemcen
- Hafsids of Béjaïa
- Ottoman Algeria
- Emirate of Abdelkader

=== Angola ===
- Kingdom of Kongo

=== Benin ===
- Kingdom of Dahomey
- Kingdom of Ouidah
- Kingdom of Porto-Novo

=== Burkina Faso ===
- Mossi Kingdoms

=== Burundi ===
- Kingdom of Burundi
- German East Africa
- Ruanda-Urundi

=== Cameroon ===
- Kingdom of Bamum

=== Central African Republic ===
- Central African Empire

=== Chad ===
- Kanem Empire
- Duguwa dynasty
- Sayfawa dynasty
- Bornu Empire
- Kingdom of Baguirmi
- Wadai Empire

=== Congo (Brazzaville) ===
- Anziku Kingdom
- Kingdom of Loango

=== Congo (Kinshasa) ===
- Kingdom of Luba
- Kingdom of Lunda
- Kuba Kingdom
- South Kasai

=== Côte d'Ivoire ===
- Kong Empire
- Kingdom of Sanwi

=== Egypt ===
- First Dynasty of Egypt
- Second Dynasty of Egypt
- Third Dynasty of Egypt
- Old Kingdom
- Fourth Dynasty of Egypt
- Fifth Dynasty of Egypt
- Sixth Dynasty of Egypt
- First Intermediate Period of Egypt
- Seventh Dynasty of Egypt
- Eighth Dynasty of Egypt
- Ninth Dynasty of Egypt
- Tenth Dynasty of Egypt
- Eleventh Dynasty of Egypt
- Middle Kingdom of Egypt
- Twelfth Dynasty of Egypt
- Thirteenth Dynasty of Egypt
- Fourteenth Dynasty of Egypt
- Fifteenth Dynasty of Egypt
- Second Intermediate Period of Egypt
- Sixteenth Dynasty of Egypt
- Abydos dynasty
- Seventeenth Dynasty of Egypt
- New Kingdom of Egypt
- Eighteenth Dynasty of Egypt
- Nineteenth Dynasty of Egypt
- Twentieth Dynasty of Egypt
- Third Intermediate Period of Egypt
- Twenty-first Dynasty of Egypt
- Twenty-second Dynasty of Egypt
- Twenty-third Dynasty of Egypt
- Twenty-fourth Dynasty of Egypt
- Twenty-fifth Dynasty of Egypt
- Late Period of ancient Egypt
- Twenty-sixth Dynasty of Egypt
- Twenty-seventh Dynasty of Egypt
- Twenty-eighth Dynasty of Egypt
- Twenty-ninth Dynasty of Egypt
- Thirtieth Dynasty of Egypt
- Thirty-first Dynasty of Egypt
- Ptolemaic Kingdom
- Ptolemaic dynasty
- Roman Egypt
- Diocese of Egypt
- Sasanian Egypt
- Ayyubid dynasty
- Mamluk Sultanate
- Tulunids
- Ikhshidid dynasty
- Egypt Eyalet
- Muhammad Ali dynasty
- Khedivate of Egypt
- Sultanate of Egypt
- Kingdom of Egypt

=== Eritrea ===
- Medri Bahri

=== Eswatini ===
- House of Dlamini

=== Ethiopia ===
- Harla Kingdom
- Sultanate of Showa
- Sultanate of Dawaro
- Kingdom of Damot
- Zagwe dynasty
- Sultanate of Ifat
- Walashma dynasty
- Ennarea
- Ethiopian Empire
- Solomonic dynasty
- Kingdom of Kaffa
- Sultanate of Harar
- Imamate of Aussa
- Emirate of Harar
- Sultanate of Aussa

=== Gabon ===
- Kingdom of Orungu

=== Ghana ===
- Asante Kingdom
- Dagbon Kingdom
- Portuguese Gold Coast
- Swedish Gold Coast
- Brandenburger Gold Coast
- British Gold Coast

=== Guinea ===
- Imamate of Futa Jallon

=== Guinea-Bissau ===
- Kaabu

=== Kenya ===
- Kenya (1963–1964)

=== Lesotho ===
- House of Moshoeshoe

=== Libya ===
- Battiadae
- Libya (satrapy)
- Africa (Roman province)
- Aghlabids
- Spanish Tripoli
- Hospitaller Tripoli
- Ottoman Tripolitania
- Karamanli dynasty
- Italian Tripolitania
- Italian Cyrenaica
- Italian Libya
- British Military Administration (Libya)
- Emirate of Cyrenaica
- Kingdom of Libya

=== Madagascar ===
- Merina Kingdom
- Boina Kingdom

=== Malawi ===
- Malawi (1964-1966)

=== Mali ===
- Keita dynasty
- Mali Empire
- Songhai Empire
- Sunni dynasty
- Askiya dynasty
- Bamana Empire
- Kénédougou Kingdom
- Massina Empire
- Toucouleur Empire
- Wassoulou Empire

=== Mauritania ===
- Ghana Empire

=== Mauritius ===
- Isle de France (Mauritius) (1715–1792) (1804–1810)
- British Mauritius
- Mauritius (1968–1992)

=== Morocco ===
- Mauretania
- Mauretania Tingitana
- Kingdom of Nekor
- Barghawata
- Midrarid dynasty
- Idrisid dynasty
- Almoravid dynasty
- Almohad Caliphate
- Marinid Sultanate
- Wattasid dynasty
- Saadi Sultanate
- Alaouite dynasty
- Spanish protectorate in Morocco
- Morocco

=== Mozambique ===
- Gaza Empire

=== Nigeria ===
- Kingdom of Kano
- Sultanate of Kano
- Kano Emirate
- Oyo Empire
- Oba of Benin
- Obi
- Sokoto Caliphate
- Sokoto Sultanate Council
- Ooduan dynasties of Yorubaland
- Kingdom of Bonny
- Kingdom of Nri

=== Rwanda ===
- Kingdom of Rwanda

=== Senegal ===
- Jolof Empire
- Imamate of Futa Toro

=== Somalia ===
- Adal Sultanate
- Ajuran Sultanate
- Habr Yunis Sultanate
- Isaaq Sultanate

=== South Africa ===
- List of Xhosa Chiefs
- List of Xhosa Kings
- Zulu Kingdom
- Union of South Africa

=== South Sudan ===
- Azande Kingdom
- Shilluk Kingdom

=== Sudan ===
- Kingdom of Kush
- Alodia
- Makuria
- Funj Sultanate
- Sultanate of Darfur
- Mahdist State

=== Tanzania ===
- Kilwa Sultanate
- Tanganyika
- Sultanate of Zanzibar

=== Tunisia ===
- Hafsid dynasty
- List of Beys of Tunis
- Husainid dynasty
- Kingdom of Tunisia

=== Uganda ===
- Ankole
- Buganda
- Kingdom Of Bunyoro
- Busoga
- Tooro
- Uganda (1962–1963)

=== Zambia ===
- Barotseland
- Chitimukulu

=== Zimbabwe ===
- Kingdom of Zimbabwe
- Kingdom of Mutapa
- Rozvi Empire
- Mthwakazi

== Asia ==
=== Afghanistan ===
- Ghaznavids
- Durrani Empire
- Emirate of Afghanistan
- Kingdom of Afghanistan

=== Bahrain ===
- State of Bahrain
- Kingdom of Bahrain

=== Bangladesh ===
- Sultanate of Bengal

=== Bhutan ===
- House of Wangchuck

=== Brunei ===
- Bruneian Sultanate (1368–1888)
- Sultan of Brunei

=== Cambodia ===
- Funan
- Chenla
- Khmer Empire
- Post-Angkor period
- Kingdom of Cambodia

=== China ===
The following is a list of major dynasties of China:

- Xia dynasty (夏朝) (2070–1600 BC)
- Shang dynasty (商朝) (1600–1046 BC)
- Zhou dynasty (周朝) (1046–256 BC)
  - Western Zhou (西周) (1046–771 BC)
  - Eastern Zhou (東周) (770–256 BC)
- Qin dynasty (秦朝) (221–207 BC)
- Han dynasty (漢朝) (202 BC–AD 9, AD 25–220)
  - Western Han (西漢) (202 BC–AD 9)
  - Eastern Han (東漢) (25–220)
- Xin dynasty (新朝) (9–23)
- Three Kingdoms (三國) (220–280)
  - Cao Wei (曹魏) (220–280)
  - Shu Han (蜀漢) (221–263)
  - Eastern Wu (東吳) (222–280)
- Jin dynasty (晉朝) (266–420)
  - Western Jin (西晉) (266–316)
  - Eastern Jin (東晉) (317–420)
- Sixteen Kingdoms (十六國) (304–439)
  - Han-Zhao (漢趙) (304–329)
  - Cheng Han (成漢) (304–347)
  - Later Zhao (後趙) (319–351)
  - Former Liang (前涼) (320–376)
  - Former Yan (前燕) (337–370)
  - Former Qin (前秦) (351–394)
  - Later Yan (後燕) (384–409)
  - Later Qin (後秦) (384–417)
  - Western Qin (西秦) (385–400, 409–431)
  - Later Liang (後涼) (386–403)
  - Southern Liang (南涼) (397–414)
  - Northern Liang (北涼) (397–439)
  - Southern Yan (南燕) (398–410)
  - Western Liang (西涼) (400–421)
  - Hu Xia (胡夏) (407–431)
  - Northern Yan (北燕) (407–436)
- Northern and Southern dynasties (南北朝) (386–589)
  - Northern dynasties (北朝) (386–581)
    - Northern Wei (北魏) (386–535)
      - Eastern Wei (東魏) (534–550)
      - Western Wei (西魏) (535–557)
    - Northern Qi (北齊) (550–577)
    - Northern Zhou (北周) (557–581)
  - Southern dynasties (南朝) (420–589)
    - Liu Song (劉宋) (420–479)
    - Southern Qi (南齊) (479–502)
    - Liang dynasty (梁朝) (502–557)
    - Chen dynasty (陳朝) (557–589)
- Sui dynasty (隋朝) (581–619)
- Tang dynasty (唐朝) (618–690, 705–907)
  - Wu Zhou (武周) (690–705)
- Five Dynasties and Ten Kingdoms (五代十國) (907–979)
  - Five Dynasties (五代) (907–960)
    - Later Liang (後梁) (907–923)
    - Later Tang (後唐) (923–937)
    - Later Jin (後晉) (936–947)
    - Later Han (後漢) (947–951)
    - Later Zhou (後周) (951–960)
  - Ten Kingdoms (十國) (907–979)
    - Former Shu (前蜀) (907–925)
    - Yang Wu (楊吳) (907–937)
    - Ma Chu (馬楚) (907–951)
    - Wuyue (吳越) (907–978)
    - Min (閩) (909–945)
    - Southern Han (南漢) (917–971)
    - Jingnan (荊南) (924–963)
    - Later Shu (後蜀) (934–965)
    - Southern Tang (南唐) (937–976)
    - Northern Han (北漢) (951–979)
- Liao dynasty (遼朝) (916–1125)
  - Western Liao (西遼) (1124–1218)
- Song dynasty (宋朝) (960–1279)
  - Northern Song (北宋) (960–1127)
  - Southern Song (南宋) (1127–1279)
- Western Xia (西夏) (1038–1227)
- Jin dynasty (金朝) (1115–1234)
- Yuan dynasty (元朝) (1271–1368)
  - Northern Yuan (北元) (1368–1635)
- Ming dynasty (明朝) (1368–1644)
  - Southern Ming (南明) (1644–1662)
- Qing dynasty (清朝) (1636–1912)
  - Later Jin (後金) (1616–1636)
- Taiping Heavenly Kingdom (1851–1864)
- Empire of China (1915–1916)
- Manchukuo (1932–1945)

=== India ===
- Seuna dynasty
- Abhira dynasty
- Pala dynasty (Kamarupa)
- Kachari Kingdom
- Mlechchha dynasty
- Koch dynasty
- Khen dynasty
- Chutia Kingdom
- Danava dynasty
- Bhauma dynasty
- Varman dynasty
- Ahom kingdom
- Gajapati Empire
- Mahameghavahana dynasty
- Eastern Ganga dynasty
- Rashtrakuta dynasty
- Sena dynasty
- Shunga Empire
- Chola dynasty
- Chera dynasty
- Kamarupa kingdom
- Kamata kingdom
- Pallava dynasty
- Rajput dynasties
- Sukarchakiya dynasty
- Soomra dynasty
- Maurya Empire
- Manikya dynasty
- Mughal Empire
- Pandiyan dynasty
- Satavahana dynasty
- Vijaynagar Empire
- Maratha Empire
- Gupta dynasty
- Chalukya dynasty
- Delhi Sultanate
- Tuluva dynasty
- Dominion of India
- Sikkim

=== Indonesia ===
- Aceh Sultanate
- Deli Sultanate
- Demak Sultanate
- Galuh Kingdom
- Gowa Sultanate
- Jambi Sultanate
- Janggala
- Kahuripan
- Kalingga Kingdom
- Kantoli
- Kediri Kingdom
- Kingdom of Pajang
- Kingdom of Tallo
- Kutai Kingdom
- Luwu
- Majapahit
- Mataram kingdom
- Mataram Sultanate
- Pagaruyung Kingdom
- Palembang Sultanate
- Peureulak Sultanate
- Samudera Pasai Sultanate
- Singasari
- Srivijaya
- Sultanate of Bacan
- Sultanate of Banjar
- Sultanate of Bima
- Sultanate of Buton
- Sultanate of Jailolo
- Sultanate of Kutai Kartanegara
- Sultanate of Serdang
- Sultanate of Siak Sri Indrapura
- Sultanate of Ternate
- Sultanate of Tidore
- Sultanate of Yogyakarta
- Sunda Kingdom
- Surakarta Sunanate
- Tarumanagara

=== Iran ===
- Median dynasty
- Achaemenid dynasty
- Parthian Empire
- Sasanian dynasty
- Ilkhanate
- Safavid dynasty
- Afsharid dynasty
- Zand dynasty
- Qajar dynasty
- Pahlavi dynasty

=== Iraq ===
- Abbasid dynasty
- Iraqi Constitutional Monarchy
- Kingdom of Iraq (1932–1958)
- List of kings of Iraq

=== Israel ===
- Davidic line
- Kingdom of Judah
- List of Kings of Judah
- King Saul
- King Solomon
- Tribe of Judah
- Kingdom of Israel (united monarchy)
- Kingdom of Israel (Samaria)
- Hasmonean Kingdom
- Herodian Kingdom
- Kingdom of Jerusalem

=== Japan ===
- Imperial House of Japan – Also known as the Yamato dynasty
- Ryukyu Kingdom

=== Jordan ===
- List of kings of Jordan
- Kingdom of Iraq (1932–1958)

=== Kazakhstan ===
- Kazakh Khanate

=== Korea ===
- Goguryeo Kingdom
- Baekje Kingdom
- Silla Kingdom
- Unified Silla Kingdom
- Goryeo dynasty
- Joseon dynasty
- Korean Empire
- List of monarchs of Korea
- Kim dynasty (as a republic but in hereditary dictatorship context)

=== Kuwait ===
- List of emirs of Kuwait

=== Laos ===
- Lan Xang
- Kingdom of Champasak
- Kingdom of Luang Prabang
- Kingdom of Vientiane
- List of monarchs of Laos
- Kingdom of Laos

=== Lebanon ===
- County of Tripoli
- Mount Lebanon Emirate

=== Malaysia ===
- Malaysia
  - Johor
  - Kedah
  - Kelantan
  - Negeri Sembilan
  - Pahang
  - Perak
  - Perlis
  - Selangor
  - Terengganu
- Raj of Sarawak

=== Maldives ===
- Sultanate of the Maldive Islands

=== Mongolia ===
- List of Mongol Khans
- Mongol Empire
- Bogd Khanate of Mongolia

=== Myanmar ===
- Kingdom of Ava
- Pagan Kingdom
- Kingdom of Mrauk U
- First Toungoo Empire
- Konbaung dynasty
- List of Burmese monarchs

=== Nepal ===
- Gorkha Kingdom
- Kingdom of Nepal
- Shah dynasty
- Upper Mustang

=== Oman ===
- Omani Empire
- Muscat and Oman
- List of rulers of Oman

=== Pakistan ===
- Dominion of Pakistan
- Amb State
- Bahawalpur State
- Chitral State
- Dir State
- Hunza State
- Kalat State
- Kharan State
- Khayrpur State
- Las Bela State
- Makran State
- Nagar State
- Swat State
- Talpur dynasty

=== Philippines ===
- Sultanate of Maguindanao
- Sultanate of Sulu

=== Qatar ===
- Emir of Qatar

=== Saudi Arabia ===
- Emirate of Diriyah
- Kingdom of Hejaz
- Kingdom of Nejd
- King of Saudi Arabia
- House of Saud
- Umayyad dynasty
- Abbasid dynasty

=== Sri Lanka ===
- Anuradhapura Kingdom
- Kingdom of Jaffna
- Kingdom of Kandy
- Kingdom of Kotte

=== Syria ===
- Kingdom of Syria

=== Tajikistan ===
- Samanid Empire

=== Thailand ===
- Lavo Kingdom
- Sukhothai Kingdom
- Ayutthaya Kingdom
- Thonburi Kingdom
- Patani Kingdom
- Chakri dynasty
- Rattanakosin Kingdom (1782–1932)
- Lan Na
- Kingdom of Chiang Mai
- Monarchy of Thailand
- List of Thai monarchs

=== Turkmenistan ===
- Seljuk Empire and dynasty
- Khwarazmian Empire

=== United Arab Emirates ===
- Rulers of UAE
- House of Al-Falasi
- Al Nahyan family
- Al Qasimi
- Al Nuaim
- Al Sharqi

=== Uzbekistan ===
- Timurid Empire
- Chagatai Khanate
- Uzbek Khanate
- Emirate of Bukhara
- Khanate of Khiva
- Khanate of Kokand

=== Vietnam ===
- Hồng Bàng dynasty (2879–258 BC)
- Âu Lạc (257–179 BC)
- Nanyue (204–111 BC)
- Early Lý dynasty (AD 544–602)
- Ngô dynasty (AD 939–965)
- Đinh dynasty (AD 968–980)
- Early Lê dynasty (AD 980–1009)
- Lý dynasty (AD 1009–1225)
- Trần dynasty (AD 1225–1400)
- Hồ dynasty (AD 1400–1407)
- Later Trần dynasty (AD 1407–1413)
- Later Lê dynasty (AD 1428–1527, AD 1533–1789)
- Mạc dynasty (AD 1527–1677)
- Tây Sơn dynasty (AD 1778–1802)
- Nguyễn dynasty (AD 1802–1945)
- Empire of Vietnam
- Domain of the Crown

=== Yemen ===
- Yemeni Zaidi State
- Mutawakkilite Kingdom of Yemen
- Mahra Sultanate

== Europe ==
=== Andorra ===
- List of Co-Princes of Andorra

=== Austria ===
- Duchy of Austria
- Archduchy of Austria
- Austrian Empire
- Austria-Hungary

=== Bavaria ===
- Duchy of Bavaria
- Electorate of Bavaria
- Kingdom of Bavaria

=== Belgium ===
- Monarchy of Belgium

=== Bulgaria ===
- First Bulgarian Empire
- Second Bulgarian Empire
- Kingdom of Bulgaria
- Bulgarian royal family

=== Czechia ===
- Duchy of Bohemia
- Kingdom of Bohemia
- Crown of Bohemia
- List of rulers of Bohemia

=== Denmark ===
- Monarchy of Denmark

=== Finland ===
- Grand Duchy of Finland
- List of Finnish monarchs

=== France ===
- Kingdom of France
- Kingdom of Arles
- First French Empire
- Second French Empire
- Duchy of Brittany
- Duchy of Burgundy
- Duchy of Lorraine
- Duchy of Normandy
- Kingdom of Corsica (1736)
- Anglo-Corsican Kingdom

=== Greece ===
- Macedonian Empire
- Byzantine Empire
- Kingdom of Thessalonica
- List of kings of Greece
- List of Greek royal consorts
- Kingdom of Greece

=== Georgia ===
- Bagrationi dynasty
- Kingdom of Georgia

=== Germany ===
- List of German monarchs
- Holy Roman Empire
- German Empire

=== Hungary ===
- Kingdom of Hungary

=== Italy ===
- Kingdom of Italy
- House of Savoy
- Kingdom of Italy (Napoleonic)
- Kingdom of Naples
- Papal States
- Kingdom of Sardinia
- Kingdom of Sicily
- Kingdom of the Two Sicilies
- Grand Duchy of Tuscany
- Duchy of Florence
- Duchy of Milan
- Duchy of Savoy

=== Liechtenstein ===
- Monarchy of Liechtenstein
- Royal House of Liechtenstein

=== Lithuania ===
- Grand Duchy of Lithuania
- Kingdom of Lithuania

=== Monaco ===
- Prince of Monaco
- Promotion of the Monegasque Family

=== Moldova ===
- Principality of Moldavia

=== Netherlands ===
- Monarchy of the Netherlands
- House of Orange-Nassau
- Kingdom of Holland

=== Norway ===
- Monarchy of Norway

=== Luxembourg ===
- Duchy of Luxembourg
- Grand Duchy of Luxembourg

=== Poland ===
- Congress Poland
- Kingdom of Poland
- Polish–Lithuanian Commonwealth
- List of kings of the Piast dynasty
- List of Polish monarchs

=== Portugal ===
- House of Braganza
- Kingdom of Portugal
- Monarchy of the North

=== Romania ===
- Kingdom of Romania

=== Russia ===
- House of Romanov
- List of Russian rulers
- Russian Empire
- Tsardom of Russia
- Golden Horde
- Grand Principality of Moscow
- Khanate of Astrakhan
- Khanate of Kazan
- Khanate of Sibir
- House of Ak-Kebek

=== Slovakia ===
- Duchy of Nitra

=== Slovenia ===
- Counts of Celje

=== Spain ===
- Royal House of Spain

==== Andalucía ====
- Emirate of Córdoba
- Emirate of Granada

==== Aragon ====
- Crown of Aragon
- Kingdom of Aragon

==== Asturias ====
- Kingdom of Asturias
- Prince of Asturias

==== Cantabria ====
- Duchy of Cantabria

==== Catalonia ====
- Count of Barcelona
- County of Barcelona
- House of Barcelona
- Principality of Catalonia

==== Castile ====
- Crown of Castile
- Kingdom of Castile

==== Galicia ====
- Kingdom of Galicia

==== León ====
- Kingdom of León
- List of Leonese monarchs

==== Majorca ====
- Kingdom of Majorca

==== Murcia ====
- Taifa of Murcia

==== Navarre ====
- Kingdom of Navarre

==== Valencia ====
- Kingdom of Valencia

=== Sweden ===
- List of Swedish monarchs

=== Turkey ===
- Seljuk Sultanate of Rum and dynasty
- Karamanids
- Ottoman Empire and dynasty

=== Ukraine ===
- Kievan Rus'
- Kingdom of Galicia–Volhynia
- Cossack Hetmanate
- Khanate of Crimea

=== United Kingdom ===
- House of Hanover
- House of Saxe-Coburg and Gotha
- House of Windsor
- Monarchy of the United Kingdom

==== England ====
- House of Wessex
- House of Knýtlinga
- House of Godwin
- House of Normandy
- House of Plantagenet
- House of Lancaster
- House of York
- House of Tudor
- House of Stuart
- Kingdom of England
- Kingdom of Great Britain
- United Kingdom of Great Britain and Ireland
- List of English monarchs

==== Scotland ====
- Guardian of Scotland
- House of Stuart
- Kingdom of Alba
- Kingdom of the Isles
- Kingdom of Scotland
- Kingdom of Great Britain
- United Kingdom of Great Britain and Ireland
- List of Scottish monarchs
- Scottish monarchs' family tree

==== Wales ====
- King of Wales
- Principality of Wales
- Prince of Wales
- Kingdom of Great Britain
- United Kingdom of Great Britain and Ireland

== Americas ==
=== Antigua and Barbuda ===
- Monarchy of Antigua and Barbuda

=== Bahamas ===
- Monarchy of the Bahamas

=== Barbados ===
- Monarchy of Barbados

=== Belize ===
- Monarchy of Belize

=== Bolivia ===
- Aymara kingdoms
- Afro-Bolivian monarchy

=== Brazil ===
- House of Braganza
- House of Orléans-Braganza
- Brazilian Imperial Family
- United Kingdom of Portugal, Brazil and the Algarves
- Kingdom of Brazil
- Empire of Brazil
- Monarquia Brasileira Isabel I of Brazil

=== Canada ===
See also Monarchism in Canada

- Monarchist League of Canada
- United Empire Loyalist

=== Costa Rica ===
- Cacicazgo of Talamanca
- Kingdom of Talamanca

=== Grenada ===
- Monarchy of Grenada

=== Haiti ===
- Kingdom of Haiti
- First Empire of Haiti
- Second Empire of Haiti

=== Honduras/Nicaragua ===
- Miskitu Kingdom

=== Jamaica ===
- Monarchy of Jamaica

=== Mexico ===
- Aztec Empire
- Emperor of Mexico
- First Mexican Empire
- Second Mexican Empire
- List of Mexican consorts
- List of Tenochtitlan rulers
- House of Iturbide
- House of Habsburg-Lorraine

=== Peru ===
- Inca Empire
- Kingdom of Cusco

=== Saint Kitts and Nevis ===
- Monarchy of Saint Kitts and Nevis

=== Saint Lucia ===
- Monarchy of Saint Lucia

=== Saint Vincent and the Grenadines ===
- Monarchy of Saint Vincent and the Grenadines

=== United States ===
- Fighting Loyalists (American Revolution)
- Loyalist (American Revolution)

== Oceania ==
=== Australia ===
- Australians for Constitutional Monarchy
- Monarchy of Australia

=== Hawaii ===
- House of Kamehameha
- Kingdom of Hawaii

=== New Zealand ===
- Monarchy of New Zealand
- Māori King Movement

=== Papua New Guinea ===
- Monarchy of Papua New Guinea

=== Solomon Islands ===
- Monarchy of the Solomon Islands

=== Tahiti ===
- Kingdom of Tahiti

=== Tonga ===
- Tuʻi Tonga Empire
- List of monarchs of Tonga

=== Tuvalu ===
- Monarchy of Tuvalu

== See also ==
- Lists of ancient kings
- List of dynasties
- Lists of monarchs
- Lists of emperors
- List of empires
- List of current monarchs of sovereign states
