= Pu of Gojoseon =

King of Gija Joseon (r. 232–220 BC)

- Hangul: 기부
- Hanja: 基否
- RR: Gi Bu
- MR: Ki Pu

Monarch name
- Hangul: 부왕
- Hanja: 否王
- RR: Buwang
- MR: Puwang

King Pu (Korean: 부왕; Hanja: 否王) was a king of Gojoseon. His personal name was Kibu (기부; 基否). He was succeeded by Chun of Gojoseon.

== See also ==
- List of Korean monarchs
- History of Korea

Pu of Gojoseon Gija Joseon Died: 220 BC
Regnal titles
Unknown	King of Gija Joseon; BC232–BC220	Succeeded by King Jun
