= Posthumous name =

Honorary name given after death

Chinese name
- Traditional Chinese: 諡號/謚號
- Simplified Chinese: 谥号
Transcriptions
Standard Mandarin
- Hanyu Pinyin: shì hào
Yue: Cantonese
- Jyutping: si3 hou6

Burmese name
- Burmese: နာမည်ပြောင်
- IPA: Narmai pyaung

Vietnamese name
- Vietnamese alphabet: thụy hiệu
- Chữ Hán: 諡號

Thai name
- Thai: สมัญญานาม
- RTGS: S̄mạỵỵānām

Korean name
- Hangul: 시호
- Hanja: 諡號
Transcriptions
- Revised Romanization: siho
- McCune–Reischauer: siho

Japanese name
- Kanji: 諡号
- Hiragana: しごう / おくりごう
Transcriptions
- Revised Hepburn: shigō/okurigō

Malay name
- Malay: Nama pusaka (نام ڤوساک)

Indonesian name
- Indonesian: Nama anumerta

Filipino name
- Tagalog: Posthumous na pamagat (ᜉᜓᜐ᜔ᜆ᜔ᜑᜓᜋᜓᜂᜐ᜔ ᜈ ᜉᜋᜄᜆ᜔)

Portuguese name
- Portuguese: Nome póstumo

Lao name
- Lao: ຊື່ຫຼິ້ນ

Khmer name
- Khmer: បច្ឆាមរណនាម

Tetun name
- Tetun: Naran póstumu

A posthumous name is an honorary name given mainly to revered dead people in East Asian culture. It is predominantly used in Asian countries such as China, Korea, Vietnam, Japan, Brunei, Cambodia, Indonesia, Laos, Malaysia, Myanmar, the Philippines, Singapore, Timor-Leste and Thailand. Reflecting on the person's accomplishments or reputation, the title is assigned after death and essentially replaces the name used during life. Although most posthumous names are given to royalty, some posthumous names are given to honor significant people without hereditary titles, such as courtiers or military generals.

To create a posthumous name, one or more adjectives are inserted before the deceased's title. The name of the state or domain of the owner may be added to avoid ambiguity.

== History ==
=== Origins ===
Early mythological rulers such as Emperor Yao were known to have posthumous names. Archaeological discoveries have shown that the titles of kings as far back as the Zhou dynasty (c. 1046 to 256 BC) are posthumous names, as in the cases of King Wu and King Wen. Posthumous names commonly made tracing linear genealogies simpler and kept a bloodline apparent.

In the Zhou dynasty, the posthumous name was usually only one character, such as Wen ('cultured') or Wu ('martial'). Over time, rulers began adding more characters to their ancestors' posthumous names. By the time of the first emperor of Tang, the length had grown to seven characters, which was taxing to pronounce or write. Therefore, emperors after the Tang dynasty are commonly referred to by either their temple name (Tang through Yuan dynasties) or era name (Ming and Qing dynasties), both of which are always two characters long.

=== Later developments ===
The use of posthumous names temporarily stopped when emperor Qin Shi Huang of the Qin dynasty proclaimed it disrespectful for the descendants of emperors to judge their elders by assigning them descriptive titles. The Han dynasty resumed using posthumous names after the fall of the Qin.

Posthumous names were used by non-Han rulers of the Sixteen Kingdoms, Nanzhao, Liao dynasty, Western Xia, Jin dynasty, Yuan dynasty, Qing dynasty, Silla, Japan, and Vietnam. King names of Hồng Bàng dynasty and Mahan followed the posthumous naming but are considered later works. Some rulers, such as Wu Zetian or rebel leaders, had similarly styled regnal names when they were alive.

Most monarchs inherited the throne and did not give negative posthumous names to the previous monarch. Later monarchs lengthened or changed some names. Emperor Aizong of Jin and the Chongzhen Emperor were referred to by different names by different people. Qin Hui of the Song dynasty had a name with a positive connotation, was then given a negative one, and later had the positive name restored. After the Song dynasty, few received negative names. In Korea, the disfavored monarchs of the Joseon dynasty did not receive posthumous names.

== General guidelines ==
=== Selection ===
Posthumous names can be praises (褒字) or deprecations (貶字). There are more praises than deprecations, so posthumous names are also commonly called respectful names (尊號; zūnhào) in Chinese. Sima Qian's Records of the Grand Historian extensively outlines the rules behind choosing the names. Most qualifications for a given name are subjective, repetitive, and highly stereotypical, meaning posthumous names are often chosen arbitrarily. Court historians usually provide such names according to the deceased's notable deeds.

=== Format ===
When combining an emperor's temple name and posthumous name, the temple name is placed first. For example, the Shunzhi Emperor, whose full posthumous title would be "Shizu, Emperor Zhang" (世祖章皇帝), combines his temple name and the last three characters of his posthumous reputation, which is the form most commonly seen in formal documents. Some monarchs' and royal members' posthumous names were extended, such as Hongwu Emperor, Nurhaci, Crown Prince Hyomyeong, Sunjo of Joseon, and Empress Dowager Cixi.

Some monarchs did not follow these guidelines; for example, monarchs of Ju, Chu, and Qi used place names, while some monarchs of Yue had Chinese transliterated posthumous words, and some monarchs of Goguryeo, Silla, and Baekje had differently styled posthumous names. Some early Japanese monarchs also had Japanese-style posthumous names (和風諡号).

== China ==
Shihao (traditional Chinese: 諡號; simplified Chinese: 谥号; pinyin: shì hào) is a Chinese term that means posthumous name and title. The names of living Chinese people may be any combination of characters. Most often, posthumous names are chosen from a relatively small list, with their literal meaning eroding as a result.

=== Format ===
The Chinese language format for posthumous names is "[state] [adjective] [title]". When translated into English, they take on the format "[title] [adjective] of [state]", such as King Wen of Zhou ('Cultured King of Zhou'), Duke Mu of Qin ('Solemn Duke of Qin'), and King Cheng of Chu ('Accomplished King of Chu'). The literal meaning of the adjective usually needs to be translated.

=== Recipients ===
==== Monarchs and consorts ====
All Chinese posthumous names for rulers end in one or two of the characters for "emperor", huángdì (皇帝), which can be shortened to Dì, except about a dozen less-recognized ones who have had only Dì and not Huáng.

Starting with Emperor Xiaowen of Han (more commonly Emperor Wen), every single Han emperor, except the first of the Eastern Han dynasty, has the character of 'filial' (孝; xiào) at the beginning of his posthumous name. 'Filial' is also used in the full posthumous names of virtually all emperors and empresses of the Tang, Song, Ming and Qing dynasties. For Qing emperors, the character xiào is placed in various positions in the string of characters. For Qing empresses given posthumous names, xiào is always initial.

The number of characters in posthumous names increased over time. The emperors of the Tang dynasty have posthumous names between 7 and 18 characters, while most in the Qing dynasty have more than 20 characters. For instance, the Shunzhi Emperor's posthumous name has 25 characters. (Note: Chinese: 體天隆運定統建極英睿欽文顯武大德弘功至仁純孝章皇帝; pinyin: tǐ tiān lóng yùn dìng tǒng jiàn jí yīng ruì qīn wén xiǎn wǔ dà dé hóng gōng zhì rén chún xiào zhāng huángdì) The woman with the longest posthumous name (also 25 characters) is Empress Dowager Cixi; (Note: Chinese: 孝欽慈禧端佑康頤昭豫莊誠壽恭欽獻崇熙配天興聖顯皇后; pinyin: xiào qīn cí xǐ duān yòu kāng yí zhāo yù zhuāng chéng shòu gōng qīn xiàn chóng xī pèi tiān xīng shèng xiǎn huánghòu) the shortened version of the name was 孝欽顯皇后 ('the Distinguished Empress who was Admirably Filial').

==== Members of the ruling family ====
According to the noble system since the Zhou dynasty, the immediate family members of the emperor were given the titles like King, Prince, Duke, or Earl, with or without actual control over a region. After their death, they would be referred to by the same title, with the posthumous name (usually one character) inserted in the middle. The characters used are mainly those used for emperors. For example, Prince Gong of the Qing dynasty was posthumously named Zhong (忠) and thus is referred to as Prince Gongzhong (恭忠親王; Gōngzhōng qīnwáng). Prince Chun was posthumously named Xian (賢), and is therefore referred to as Prince Chunxian (醇賢親王; Chúnxián qīnwáng).

The posthumous name could include more than one character. For example, Prince Shuncheng Lekdehun was posthumously honoured as Prince Shuncheng Gonghui (多罗顺承恭惠郡王). Yinxiang, Prince Yi was granted a posthumous name consisting of 9 characters, Zhongjing chengzhi qinshen lianming xian (忠敬诚直勤慎廉明贤).

==== Officials ====
It was also common for people with no hereditary titles, primarily accomplished scholar-officials or ministers, to be given posthumous names by the imperial court. The characters used are mainly the same as those used for emperors. The length, however, was restricted to one or two characters. The posthumous name is sometimes rendered canonization in English, for the scholar-official to Confucianism is considered analogous to the saint in the Catholic Church. However, the process is shorter.

Confucius has been given long posthumous names in almost every prominent dynasty; one of the most commonly used was Zhìshèngxiānshī (至聖先師). Sometimes a person is given a posthumous name not by the court, but by his family or disciples. Such names are private posthumous names (私諡; sīshì). For example, the sīshì given to Tao Qian was Jìngjié (靖節).

=== Modern use and discontinuation ===
The emperors of China continued to receive posthumous names of increasing length as a matter of ritual long after the naming convention had been abandoned in casual speech and writing. The Guangxu Emperor, who died in 1908 and was the last emperor to receive a posthumous name, has a 21-character title: "Emperor Tongtian Chongyun Dazhong Zhizheng Jingwen Weiwu Renxiao Ruizhi Duanjian Kuanqin Jing". (Note: 同天崇運大中至正經文緯武仁孝睿智端儉寬勤景皇帝) Puyi, the last emperor of China, did not receive a posthumous name upon his death in 1967.

== Korea ==
In Silla, every monarch was given the title of wang (Korean: 왕; Hanja: 王; lit. 'king') with two characters in posthumous names from Jijeung of Silla. On the other hand, all posthumous names for kings of Balhae were restricted to one character. Most of the kings of Goryeo and Joseon were more often given temple names than posthumous names, unlike in the dynasties of ancient Korea. All posthumous names for the rulers of Goryeo and Joseon end in two of the characters for Daewang (대왕; 大王; lit. 'great king'). This is a longer name made up of adjectives characteristic of the king's rule.

Details of the system of posthumous names were recorded during the Joseon dynasty. During the Joseon dynasty, officials discussed and decided on the king's posthumous name five days after the king's funeral. Before his temple and posthumous names were chosen, the deceased king was called Daehaeng daewang (대행대왕; 大行大王). The Ministry of Rites (예조; 禮曹) was in charge of the naming. The Ministry of Rites selected three candidates and reported them to the next king, who chose the name he liked best.

Deceased kings' names were made up of three parts: the temple name (묘호), eulogistic names (존호), and posthumous names (시호). A deposed king, on the other hand, was not given any posthumous names with temple names unless reinstated. They were degraded to the rank of a gun (군; 君; lit. 'prince'); Yeonsan-gun and Gwanghae-gun are notable examples. Some men did not ascend to the throne in their lifetime but were proclaimed kings after they died by their descendants who became kings. In Joseon, nine men were raised to the status of emeritus kings.

Gojong of Joseon proclaimed Korea an empire in 1897, receiving the title of emperor, thus the posthumous names of Gojong and Sunjong end in two of the characters for Hwangje (황제; 皇帝; lit. 'emperor'). Crown Prince Hyomyeong has been given the longest posthumous name in Korea. He was posthumously elevated in status and given the title Emperor Munjo with 117 characters in posthumous names in 1899.

Examples of full and shortened posthumous names
Ruler	Shortened name	Shortened name (romanized)	Posthumous name	Posthumous name (romanized)
Gwangjong of Goryeo	Korean: 광종 Hanja: 光宗	Gwangjong	Korean: 홍도 선열 평세 숙헌 의효 강혜 대성 대왕; Hanja: 弘道宣烈平世肅憲懿孝康惠大成大王	Hongdo Seonyeol Pyeongse Sukheon Uihyo Ganghye Daeseong Daewang
Gojong of Joseon	Korean: 고종 Hanja: 高宗	Gojong	Korean: 통천 융운 조극 돈륜 정성 광의 명공 대덕 요준 순휘 우모 탕경 응명 입기 지화 신열 외훈 홍업 계기 선력 건행 곤정 영의 홍휴 수강 문헌 무장 인익 정효 태황제; Hanja: 統天隆運 肇極敦倫 正聖光義 明功大德 堯峻舜徽 禹謨湯敬 應命立紀 至化神烈 巍勳洪業 啓基宣曆 乾行坤定 英毅弘休 壽康文憲 武章仁翼 貞孝太皇帝	Tongcheon Yung-un Jogeuk Dollyun Jeongseong Gwang-ui Myeonggong Daedeok Yojun Sunhwi Umo Tanggyeong Eungmyeong Ipgi Jihwa Sinyeol Oehun Hong-eop Gyegi Seonryeok Geonhaeng Gonjeong Yeong-ui Honghyu Sugang Munheon Mujang Inik Jeonghyo Taehwangje

=== Modern use ===
In the Republic of Korea, the Jeonju Lee Royal Family Association has issued posthumous names, without recognition from the government, to Empress Sunjeonghyo; Crown Prince Euimin; and Gu, Prince Imperial Hoeun.

== Japan ==
In Japan, posthumous names are divided into two types: shigō (Japanese: 諡号) and tsuigō (追号).

In addition to the title, Tennō (天皇; 'heavenly sovereign', usually translated as 'emperor') is a part of all Japanese emperors' posthumous names, most of them consisting of two kanji characters, although a few have three. Some names are given several generations later—this is the case for Emperor Jimmu and Emperor Antoku, for example. Others are provided immediately after death, like that of Emperor Monmu.

=== Shigō ===
A shigō (諡号), or okuri-na (諡), name describes the accomplishments and the virtues of the rulers. There are two styles of emperors' shigō: Chinese or Han style (漢風諡号) and Japanese style (和風諡号).

==== Chinese-style (Han-style) ====
- Jinmu Tennō (神武天皇, lit. 'Divine Might') – Emperor Jimmu
- Nintoku Tennō (仁徳天皇, lit. 'Benevolent and Virtuous') – Emperor Nintoku
- Ōjin Tennō (応神天皇, lit. 'Answering the Deities') – Emperor Ōjin

==== Japanese-style ====
- Ōhatsuse Wakatake no Sumera-mikoto (大泊瀬幼武天皇) – Emperor Yūryaku, better known by his Chinese-style shigō of Yūryaku Tennō (雄略天皇, lit. 'Mighty Strategist')
- Nunakuranofutotamashiki no Sumeramikoto (渟中倉太珠敷天皇) – Emperor Bidatsu, better known by his Chinese-style shigō of Bidatsu Tennō (敏達天皇, lit. 'Intelligent and Virtuous')

=== Tsuigō ===
Tsuigō names are derived from the name of locations and era names, among others, with era names being the modern convention. Those Japanese emperors are also sometimes called teigō (帝号; 'emperor name(s)').

Those who were named after the place where the emperor was born, lived or frequented:

- Saga Tennō (嵯峨天皇) – Emperor Saga, named after a palace (in, 院)
- Ichijō Tennō (一条天皇) – Emperor Ichijō, named after an official residence (tei, 邸)
- Kōmyō Tennō (光明天皇) – Emperor Kōmyō, named after a temple
- Higashiyama Tennō (東山天皇) – Emperor Higashiyama, named after a hill
- Meiji Tennō (明治天皇) – Emperor Meiji, named after his era name

Those who were named after an emperor whose admirable characteristics resemble those of an earlier one by adding Go (後; lit. 'later') as a prefix to the earlier emperor's name:

- Go-Ichijō Tennō (後一条天皇) – Emperor Go-Ichijō, who was preceded by Emperor Ichijō
- Go-Daigo Tennō (後醍醐天皇) – Emperor Go-Daigo, who was preceded by Emperor Daigo
- Go-Sakuramachi Tennō (後桜町天皇) – Empress Go-Sakuramachi, who was preceded by her father Emperor Sakuramachi

The posthumous name of some emperors was derived from the combination of characters from two previous emperors' posthumous names:

- Empress Genmei (Note: Genmei Tennō (元明天皇)) + Empress Genshō (Note: Genshō Tennō (元正天皇)) → Empress Meishō (Note: Meishō Tennō (明正天皇))
- Empress Shōtoku (Note: Shōtoku Tennō (称徳天皇)) + Emperor Kōnin (Note: Kōnin Tennō (光仁天皇)) → Emperor Shōkō (Note: Shōkō Tennō (称光天皇))

=== Modern use ===
Official posthumous names are still used in Japan. Beginning with the Emperor Meiji who died in 1912, the posthumous name of an emperor has always been the era name of his reign. In such cases, the posthumous names belong to the category of tsuigō. After his death, Hirohito was formally renamed Emperor Shōwa (昭和天皇, Shōwa Tennō) after his era; Japanese people now refer to him by only that name, as referring to an emperor by his given name is considered disrespectful. A non-royal deceased person may be given a posthumous Buddhist name known as kaimyō but is, in practice, still referred to by the living name.

== Malay world ==
In the Malay sultanates and other related sultanates and kingdoms of Southeast Asia, the posthumous names of the sultans and rulers always begin with the word Marhum (Jawi: مرحوم), an Arabic loanword meaning 'the late ruler'. The word Marhum is followed by either the place of death or the burial site. Mahmud II of Johor, who was killed while being carried on a royal litter in 1699, was posthumously known as Marhum Mangkat dijulang, which literally means 'the late ruler who died while being carried'.

Other Malay posthumous names include:

- Marhum Kampar (مرحوم كمڤر, lit. 'the late ruler who was buried at Kampar') – Mahmud Shah of Malacca
- Marhum Langgar (مرحوم لڠݢر, lit. 'the late ruler who was buried at Langgar') – Muhammad Shah of Pahang

== Thailand ==
Since the death of King Chulalongkorn in 1910, the king has been named for his reigning era formally used in the Royal Gazette. Some were given posthumous names to elevate their title, such as in the case of King Ananda, who was posthumously titled Phra Athamaramathibodin. Kings Ananda and Bhumibol do not have specific reign names, and other kings, such as Chulalongkorn, are referred to using personal names. Most Thai people never refer to the king by their unique name or the informal Chula Chom Klao, as it is considered disrespectful. The personal name of King Vajiralongkorn will be regarded as casual until his death, when it will be replaced with the reign name Vajilaklao.

== Vietnam ==
The use of posthumous names ceased in Vietnam with the Khải Định Emperor (Tự Thiên Gia Vận Thánh Minh Thần Trí Nhân Hiếu Thành Kính Di Mô Thừa Liệt Tuyên Hoàng Đế Chu Han: 嗣天嘉運聖明神智仁孝誠敬貽謨承烈宣皇帝), who died in 1925.

== See also ==
- Taboo against naming the dead
- Naming customs of East Asia
  - Chinese name
  - Japanese name
  - Korean name
  - Thai name
  - Malay name
  - Vietnamese name
