= Ivan Stolbovoy =

Russian footballer

Personal information
- Full name: Ivan Aleksandrovich Stolbovoy
- Date of birth: 11 August 1986 (age 40)
- Place of birth: Olga, Primorsky Krai, Russian SFSR
- Height: 1.79 m (5 ft 10 in)
- Positions: Forward; midfielder

Senior career*
Years	Team	Apps	(Gls)
2005	FC Volga Tver	14	(0)
2005	FC Presnya Moscow	9	(2)
2006	FC Dynamo Makhachkala	34	(4)
2007	FC Rotor Volgograd	9	(0)
2007–2008	FC Dynamo-Voronezh Voronezh	8	(2)
2008–2010	FC Volga Tver	54	(18)
2011	FC Podolye Podolsky district	21	(1)
2012	FC Dnepr Smolensk	6	(3)
2012–2013	FC Luch-Energiya Vladivostok	28	(6)
2013	FC Khimik Dzerzhinsk	15	(4)
2014	FC Zenit Penza	9	(3)
2014–2015	FC Khimik Dzerzhinsk	22	(5)
2015–2017	FC Luch-Energiya Vladivostok	53	(10)
2017	FC Rotor Volgograd	8	(2)
2018	FC Luch-Energiya Vladivostok	1	(0)
2018–2019	FC Volgar Astrakhan	19	(4)
2019	FC Inter Cherkessk	15	(9)
2020–2021	Akzhayik	12	(2)
2021–2022	FC Znamya Noginsk	39	(10)
- * Club domestic league appearances and goals

Ivan Aleksandrovich Stolbovoy (Russian: Иван Александрович Столбовой; born 11 August 1986) is a Russian former professional football player.

== Career ==
=== Club career ===
He made his Russian Football National League debut for FC Dynamo Makhachkala on 26 March 2006 in a game against FC Mashuk-KMV Pyatigorsk.

In 2020, Stolbovoy joined FC Akzhayik in Kazakhstan.
