= Olga, Russia =

Urban locality in Olginsky District, Primorsky Krai, Russia

Coordinates: 43°44′40″N 135°17′5″E

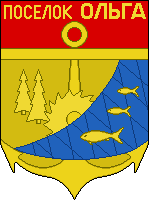
Coat of arms of Olga

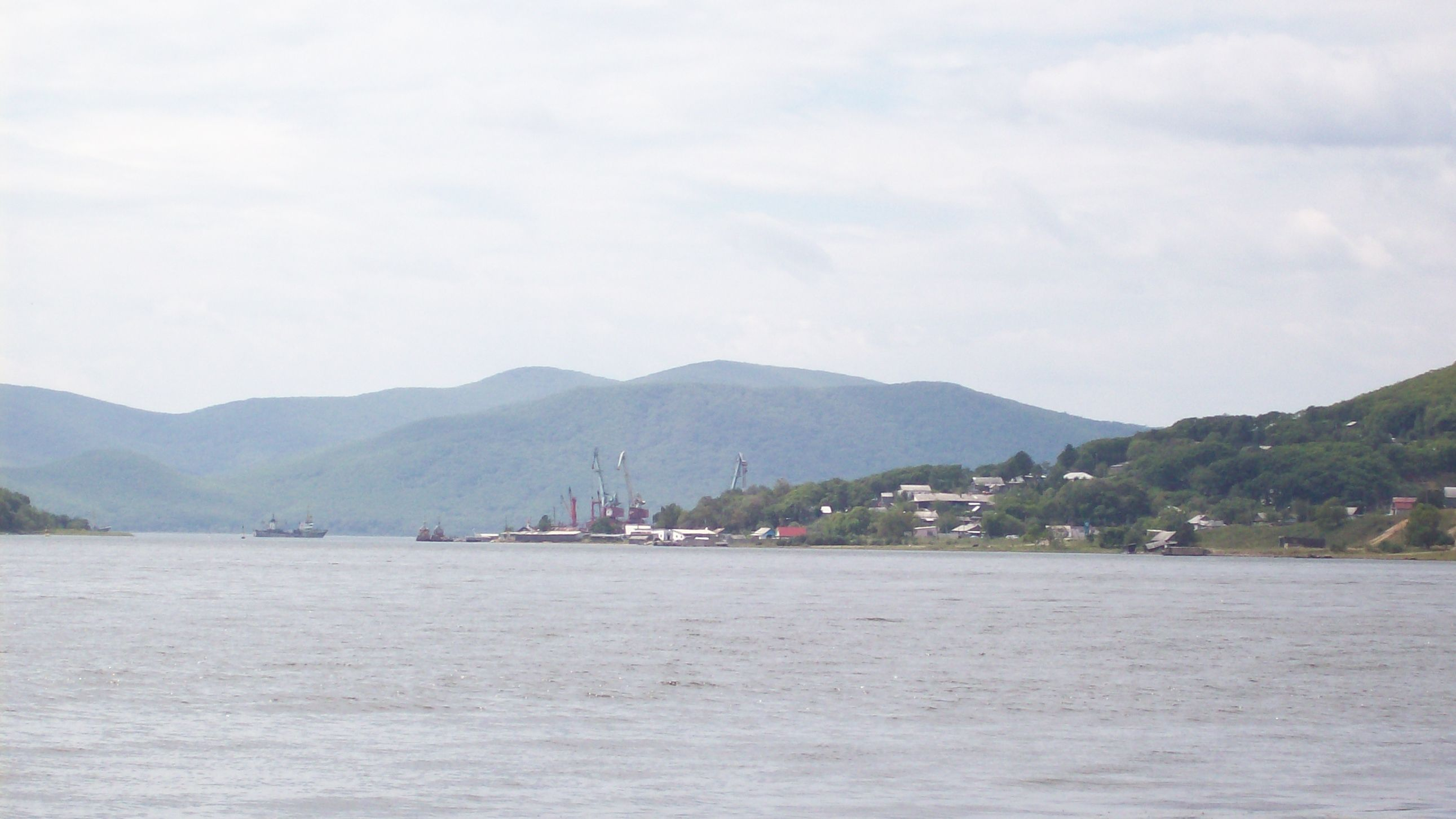
The port of Olga

Olga (Russian: О́льга) is an urban locality (an urban-type settlement) and the administrative center of Olginsky District of Primorsky Krai, Russia, located on the Olga Bay of the Sea of Japan, 240 kilometers (150 mi) northeast of Nakhodka. Population: 4,026 (2010 census); 4,453 (2002 census); 4,802 (1989 Soviet census).

== History ==
During the Balhae Kingdom period, a town called Anju was founded near present-day Olga on the shores of Olga Bay.

The Russian military post of Olga was established in 1858, several months after the region passed to Russia under the terms of the Treaty of Aigun. It was named after St. Olga. In the 19th century, the settlement had a significant Chinese minority. The town's name is similar to that of the eldest daughter of Nicholas II.

== Notable residents ==
- Valentin Parinov (born 1959), swimmer
- Ivan Stolbovoy (born 1986), football player
