= Valentin Parinov =

Russian swimmer

Personal information
- Born: 16 June 1959 (age 67) Olga, Primorsky Krai, Soviet Union
- Height: 1.81 m (5 ft 11 in)
- Weight: 69 kg (152 lb)

Sport
- Sport: Swimming
- Club: Zakhmet Ashkhabad
Medal record
Men's swimming
Representing Soviet Union
European Championships
Silver medal – second place	1977 Jönköping	1500 m freestyle

Valentin Olegovich Parinov (Russian: Валентин Олегович Паринов; born 16 June 1959) is a retired Russian swimmer who won a silver medal in the 1500 m freestyle at the 1977 European Aquatics Championships, behind Vladimir Salnikov. He also competed in the same event at the 1976 Summer Olympics but did not reach the finals.

In 1973, aged 14, Parinov won two gold medals in the 400 m and 1500 m freestyle at Junior European Championships. The same year he set European and National records in the 800 m and 1500 m events among seniors.
