= Kija Chosŏn =

Ancient kingdom in Korea (1120–194 BC)

Korean name
- Hangul: 기자조선
- Hanja: 箕子朝鮮
Transcriptions
- Revised Romanization: Gija Joseon
- McCune–Reischauer: Kija Chosŏn

Chinese name
- Traditional Chinese: 箕氏朝鮮
- Simplified Chinese: 箕氏朝鲜
Transcriptions
Standard Mandarin
- Hanyu Pinyin: Jīshì Cháoxiǎn
- Wade–Giles: Chi-shih Ch'ao-hsien

Kija Chosŏn (1120–194 BCE) was a dynasty of Old Chosŏn allegedly founded by the sage Jizi (Kija), a member of the Shang (Yin) dynasty royal house.

== Traditional account ==
=== Chinese records ===
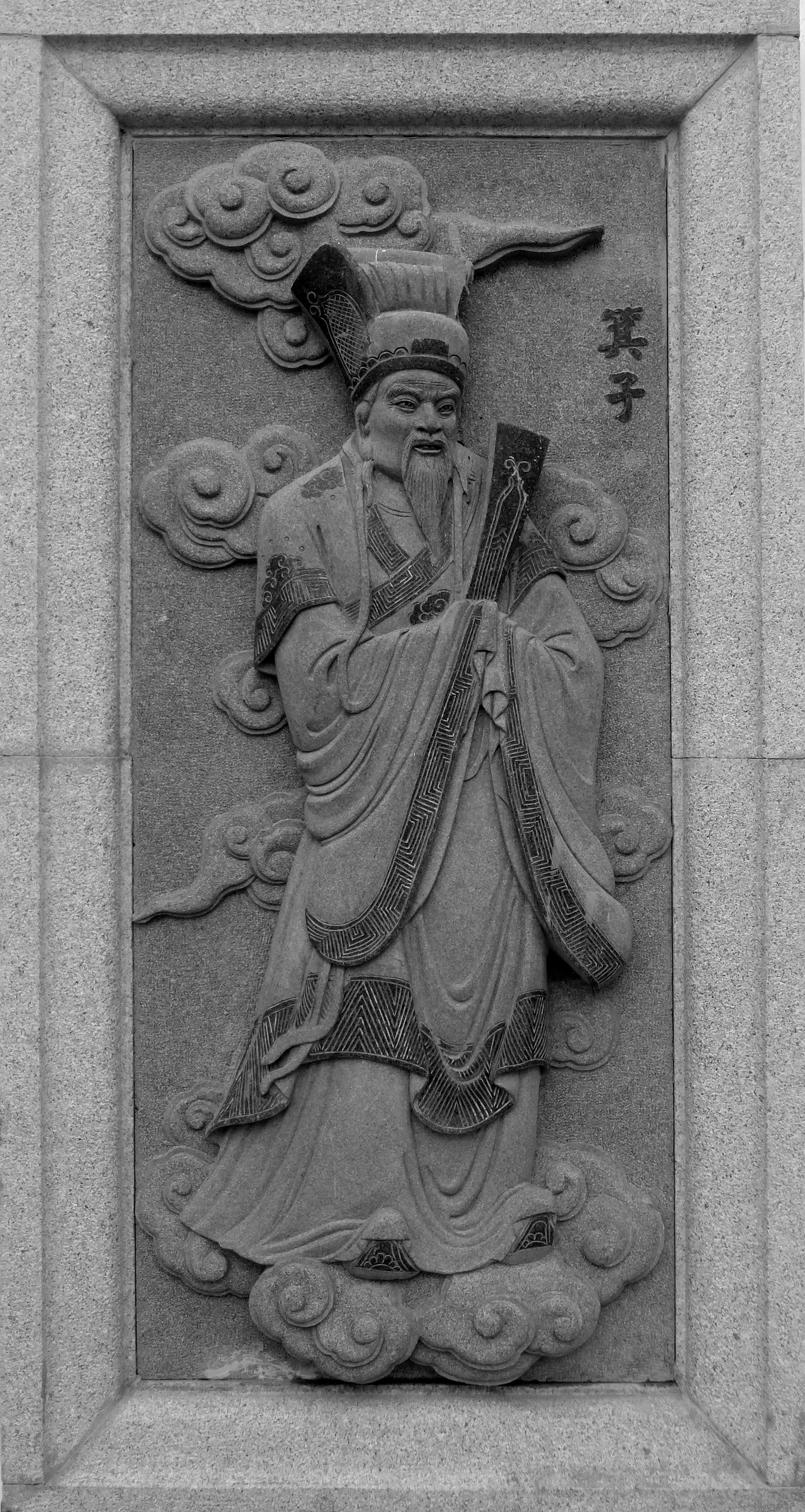
Jizi, the alleged founder of Kija Chosŏn, according to the Book of Han

Chinese records before the Qin dynasty (Note: It is true that the Burning of books and burying of scholars made a lot of the original pre-Qin dynasty books missing, but the ones which are later compiled from old sources are still treated as pre-Qin.) describe Kija (箕子) as the paternal uncle (or brother in other records) of the last king of the Shang dynasty, the tyrannical King Zhou, but contain no mention of king Zhou's relationship with Old Chosŏn. Kija was imprisoned by the tyrant until the downfall of Shang Kingdom, when King Wu of Zhou released him.

Records written after the Qin dynasty, when the Han dynasty and Old Chosŏn were at war, add that Kija led 5,000 to the east of present-day Beijing, as written in the "Geography" section of the Book of Han (although some, especially in China, believe him to have moved to present-day Korea), and became the founding king of Kija Chosŏn. In Sima Qian's Shiji, Kija is mentioned in the following sentence:

『於是武王乃封箕子於朝鮮而不臣也』

["King Wu enfeoffed Kija to Chosŏn, though he was not a vassal (of Zhou)"]

=== Korean historiography ===
No contemporary Korean sources existed for Kija Chosŏn, and the oldest sources produced in Korea were from the Goryeo dynasty. The earliest Korean record about Kija Chosŏn can be seen from Samguk yusa, (Note: No contemporary Korean sources exist for Kija Chosŏn, and the oldest sources produced in Korea about Korean history were from the Goryeo dynasty, as history books made before their times were usually lost, either through war or book burnings. However, Samguk Sagi and Samguk Yusa have some authority as they are said to be compilations of records that were much older than the date those books were published, which were accessible at the time of the project.)

『御國一千五百年. 周虎武王卽位己卯, 封箕子於朝鮮, 壇君乃移於藏唐京, 後還隱於阿斯達爲山神, 壽一千九百八歲』

[Later Dangun moved his capital to Asadal on T'aebaek-san and ruled 1500 years, until king Wu of Zhou (ancient Chinese dynasty) placed Kija on the throne (traditional date 1122 BC). When Kija arrived, Dangun moved to Changtang-kyong and then returned to Asadal, where he became a mountain god at the age of 1908.]

It was widely believed that Kija Chosŏn was located on the Korean Peninsula, replacing Old Chosŏn of Dangun. But some Korean scholars believed that Kija settled west of Old Chosŏn, based on records from "Geography" section of the Book of Han, and the Korean Samguk yusa that suggests that Old Chosŏn continued to coexist with Kija Chosŏn after the migration of Kija. These scholars believed that Kija's influence was limited to western part of Old Chosŏn.

The Genealogy of the Cheongju Han Clan (청주한씨세보) lists the names of 73 rulers of Kija Chosŏn and their periods of reign; however, it is not widely accepted by current Korean mainstream historians.

Wiman Joseon is said to begin with the usurpation of the throne from Chun of Old Chosŏn and the line of kings descended from Kija.

== Controversy surrounding its existence ==
=== Sin Ch'aeho's analysis ===
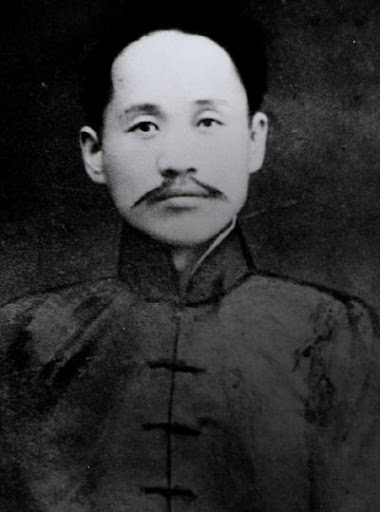
Sin Ch'aeho (1880–1936)

Sin Ch'aeho said that Kija Chosŏn (323–194 BCE) refers to the putative period of Beonjoseon, one of the Three Confederate States of Old Chosŏn, after the Marquess of Joseon from the Gi clan was invaded by Yan as shown in the records of Weilüe. Chinese traditional accounts indicate that Gihu's ancestor, Kija, was the same person as Jizi (both written as 箕子 in Hanzi/Hanja).

According to Sin Ch'aeho's Chosŏn sanggosa, the Three Confederate States of Gojoseon began disintegrating after its king had been killed by a rebel from the Chinese state of Yan at around 323 BCE. With this, the five ministers of Beonjoseon began contending for the throne. Marquess of Chosŏn from the Gi clan joined in this struggle, and emerged victorious as the new king of Beonjoseon, defeating the competitors for the throne. He established Kija Chosŏn, named after his ancestor Kija. During Kija Chosŏn, the king enjoyed strong sovereign powers. Eventually, in 94 BCE, Kija Chosŏn fell after King Chun was overthrown by Wiman, who established Wiman Joseon in its place.

=== Ryū Imanishi's analysis ===
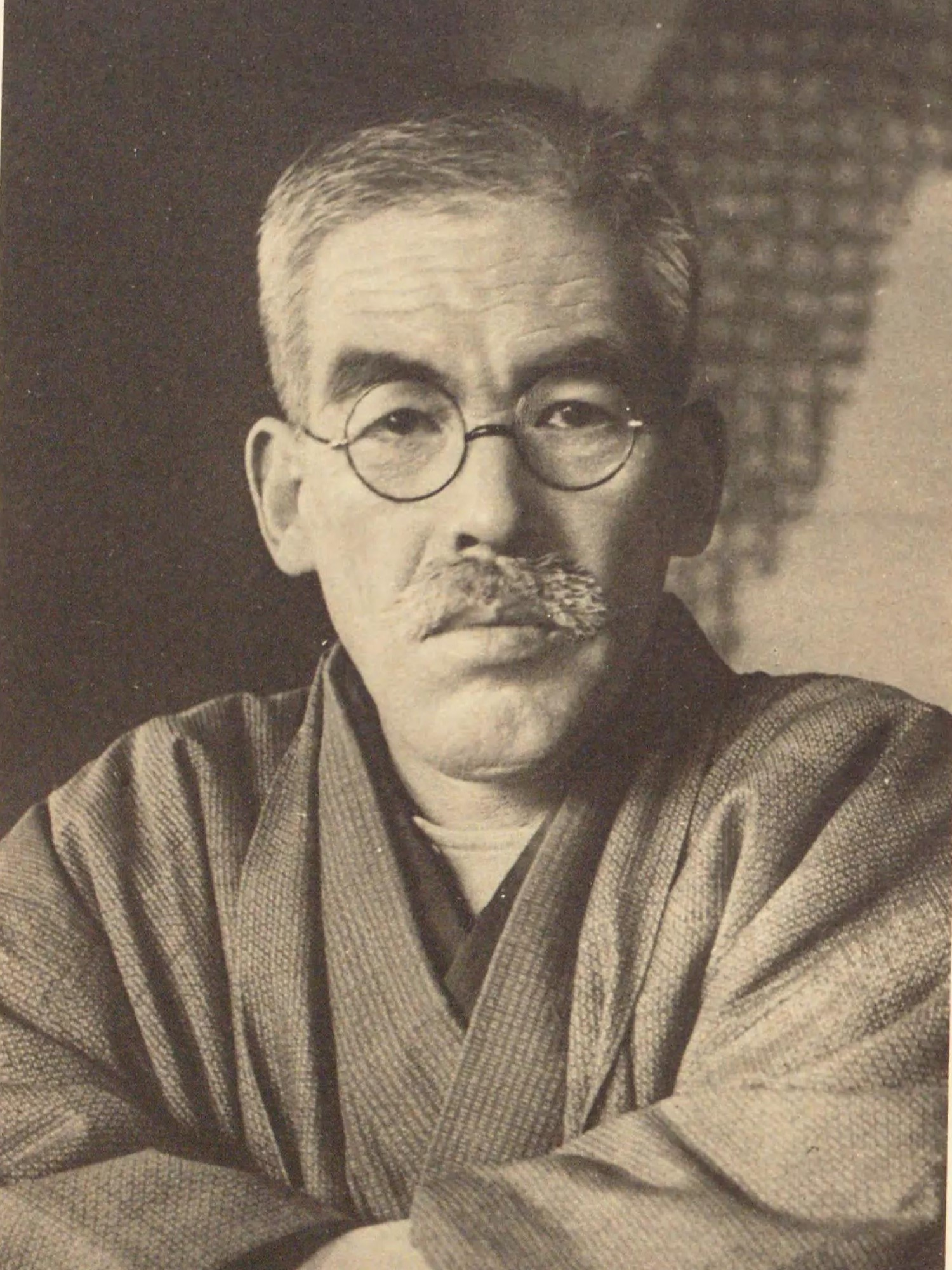
Ryū Imanishi (1875–1932)

20th century Japanese historian and anthropologist, Ryū Imanishi (今西 龍), stated that Kija Chosŏn was a fabrication created by the Cheongju Han Clan (alleged descendants of Jizi/Kija) of the Lelang Commandery in order to elevate their social status to that of royalty in his 1922 book, Kishichōsen Densetsu Kō (箕子朝鮮伝説考; Analysis of the legend of Kija Chosŏn). Imanishi asserted that Koreans and Jizi had no direct relations outside of unverifiable claims, and that they were not to be taken literally.

Imanishi, who is known to be the pioneer of discovering much of the remains of the Lelang Commandery in Pyongyang, emphasized in his book that though the remnants of Chinese influence (specifically Han dynasty) is clear especially in the northern regions of the peninsula, the likelihood of Kija Chosŏn's existence is improbable as actual evidence of Jizi's Shang dynasty relics are nowhere to be seen.

=== Naka Michiyo's analysis ===
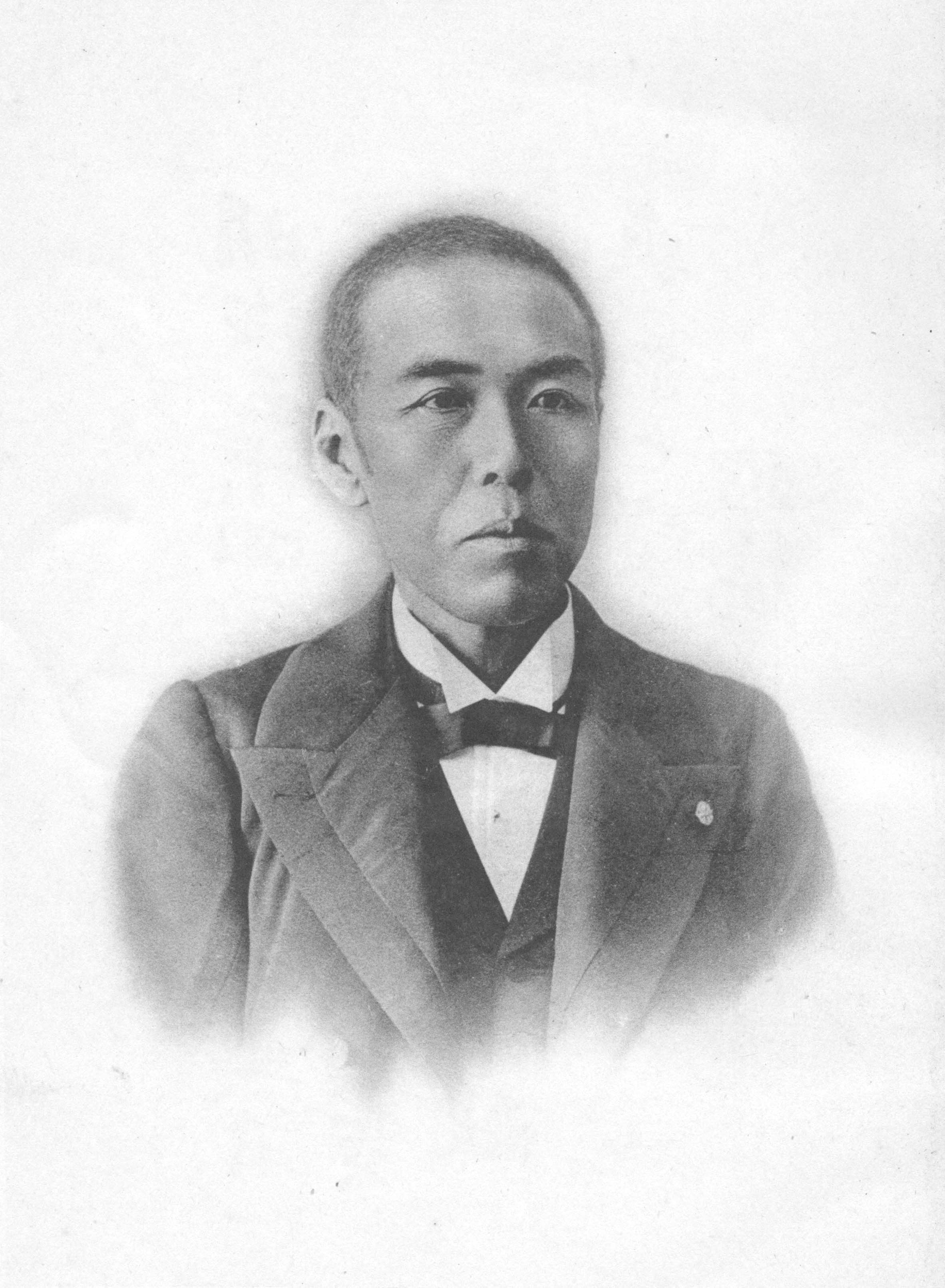
Michiyo Naka (1851–1908)

Another 20th century Japanese historian named Naka Michiyo (那珂 通世) made a more assertive analysis, considering the stories found in the Samguk yusa to be fabricated myths made by Buddhist traditions in his Korea's Ancient History Analysis (朝鮮古史考). He discredited both founding legends of Tan'gun and Kija (Jizi) as mere "fiction (虛構)".

Different from Imanishi, who took a more archaeological approach to discerning the historicity of Kija Chosŏn, Michiyo's analysis was based on the religious climate in Goryeo dynasty when the Samguk yusa was created, criticizing the authenticity based on the dominance of Buddhism and emphasis on legends rather than historicity at the time. His conclusion was that the founding myths of ancient Korea were either highly aggrandized or were likely fabricated by foreign influence (such as Buddhism or Sinicization).

=== Other views ===
The Korean historian Kim Jung-bae claims that the association between Jizi and Old Chosŏn is wrong. He believed that the existence of Kija Chosŏn as a state established by Jizi was fabricated during Han dynasty. He further claims that the Bamboo Annals, and Confucius's Analects, which was the earliest extant text that referred to Jizi, did not say anything about his going to Old Chosŏn. Similarly, the Records of the Grand Historian, written soon after the conquest of Wiman Joseon by the Han dynasty, made no reference to Joseon in its discussions about Jizi and no reference to Jizi in its discussions about Joseon.

According to some sources, ancient Koreans claimed that Kija came from the Zhou dynasty but there is no archaeological evidence to support early involvement of the Chinese.

In modern times, the general consensus in Korea is that Kija never truly settled in Korea and the claims in regards to his supposed founding of Kija Chosn were fabricated as they were made after the Han dynasty and not the contemporary Shang dynasty nor pre-Qin periods.

== See also ==
- History of Korea
- History of Manchuria
- Cheongju Han clan
- Haengju Ki clan
- Taewon Seonu clan
- Icheon Seo clan
