= Oga (Gojoseon) =

Ohga (오가, 五加) or Five Ministers is a political structure of Gojoseon and Buyeo, according to Joseon Sanggosa. Literally, Ohga means five gas because Oh means five in Korean.

Ohga were composed of Dotga, Gaeda, Soga, Malga and Shinga. Dotga is a minister of the eastern area, Gaega was a minister of the western area, Soga was a minister of southern area, Malga was a minister of the northern area, and Shinga was the supreme minister among the Five Ministers. Shinga had responsibility for the central area. These names of Ohga resembled the name of animals. Dot in Dotga means pig, Gae in Gaeda means dog, so in Soga means cow, mal in Malga means horse. Shin in Shinga does not mean any animal, and it always represents Heaven because the Koreans consider themselves as the descendants of Heaven.
