= Old Gaffers Association =

Old Gaffers Association OGA
- Sport: Sailing
- Official website: www.oga.org.uk

HISTORY
- Year of formation: 1963

FINANCE
- Company status: Unincorporated Association

AREAS
- Bristol Channel; Dublin Bay; East Coast; North East; North Wales; North West; Northern Ireland; Scotland; South West

The Old Gaffers Association (OGA – The Association for Gaff Rig Sailing) is a not-for-profit unincorporated association. Formed in the United Kingdom in 1963, it is devoted to promoting the recreational use of traditional sailing boats, Gaff rig. It is primarily funded by membership dues and regularly hosts competitions, boat building workshops, and lectures.

It currently states its aim as 'to encourage interest in gaff rig, lug and spritsail rigs'. It was originally created in the early 1960s when some recreational sailors became concerned that traditional sailing boats were disappearing from British shores. It was hoped that holding races specifically for traditional boats would encourage people to own and maintain the boats. The activities have expanded over the years and now include a range of sailing and social events including winter lectures, cruising in company and events for small boats.

The rules of the association require every area to hold at least one event every year which should include a race for gaff rigged boats. Most areas hold additional events including:

- The Yarmouth Gaffers Regatta in the Solent (was held biennially, but in September 2018 it was announced that the event would no longer be held)
- The August Classics Cruise in Suffolk and Essex
- The Dublin Bay OGA Regatta
- The Campbelltown Classics
- Portaferry Sails and Sounds
- Holyhead Traditional Boat Festival

The OGA has a Youth Fund which provides small grants to OGA Areas to help fund events which get young people out sailing on traditionally rigged boats. Grants can also be made, on the recommendation of OGA Areas, for non-OGA projects fitting the criteria of the fund.

The OGA has members all over the world. It has close links with affiliated associations in France, the Netherlands (which has members in Belgium), Canada and Australia.

== History ==
The first ever 'Old Gaffers' race was held on the Solent in 1959, with just 13 boats. A similar race was held on the east coast of England in 1963. The growing success of these early races, open to gaff rig boats, led to the formation of the OGA as a national association at the Little Ship Club, Maldon, Essex in 1963. In the early days, activities were focussed on rescuing or preserving old gaff rigged boats.

Over the years areas have come and gone but Sailing Gaffers provides some indication of when the current areas started.

- 1963 Solent, East Coast
- 1973 South West, Scotland
- 1974 North East
- 1978 Bristol Channel
- 1989 Northern Ireland, North West
- 1991 Dublin Bay
- 1997 North Wales
- 2004 Trailer Section

In 2013 the association celebrated its 50th anniversary with the publication of a book of stories from the history of the Association. 21 member boats from the UK and the Netherlands took part in a UK circumnavigation (Round Britain Challenge) and hosted a number of area based events culminating in a Golden Jubilee Festival at Cowes attended by more than 180 gaff-rigged boats.
