= Lists of emperors =

This is a list including all rulers who had carried the title of emperor or who ruled states generally regarded as empires in the constitutional or dynastic sense. It excludes rulers whose states are described as colonial empires solely because of their overseas possessions, such as the British, French, Dutch, Spanish and Portuguese empires, unless they also held an explicit imperial title, as the British monarchs did through the title Emperor (or Empress) of India between 1876 and 1947. Some titles, such as “tsar” or “padishah”, could denote “emperor” in certain historical contexts, but did not always carry an imperial meaning. For example, “tsar” in the modern Kingdom of Bulgaria is generally understood as equivalent to “king” rather than “emperor”, while "padishah" in the Kingdom of Afghanistan is not generally regarded as an imperial title.

== Emperors of empires ==
=== Asia ===
Empire	Duration	Title(s)	See
Iran
Achaemenid Empire	550 BC–330 BC	Shahanshah ("King of Kings")	List of Persian monarchs
Seleucid Empire	312 BC–63 BC	Basileus Megas ("Great King")	List of Seleucid rulers
Parthian Empire	247 BC–224 AD	Shahanshah ("King of Kings")	List of Persian monarchs
Sasanian Empire	224–651	Shahanshah ("King of Kings")	List of Persian monarchs
Buyid Empire	978–1062	Shahanshah ("King of Kings")	List of Persian monarchs
Seljuk Empire	1037–1194	Shahanshah ("King of Kings")	List of Persian monarchs
Ilkhanate	1295–1388	Padishah ("Master King")	List of Persian monarchs
Timurid Empire	1370–1507	Padishah ("Master King")	List of Persian monarchs
Qara Qoyunlu	1452–1469	Padishah ("Master King")	List of rulers of Qara Qoyunlu
Aq Qoyunlu	1465–1508	Padishah ("Master King")	List of rulers of Aq Qoyunlu
Safavid Empire	1501–1736; 1750–1773	Shahanshah ("King of Kings")	List of Persian monarchs
Hotak dynasty	1722–1738	Shahanshah ("King of Kings")	List of Persian monarchs
Afsharid Empire	1736–1796	Shahanshah ("King of Kings")	List of Persian monarchs
Qajar Empire	1789–1925	Shahanshah ("King of Kings")	List of Persian monarchs
Pahlavi Iran	1925–1979	Shahanshah ("King of Kings")	List of Persian monarchs
Indian subcontinent
Maurya Empire	322 BC–184 BC	Chakravarti ("ideal universal ruler"); Samrat ("proper ruler")	List of Mauryan emperors
Chola Empire	848–1279	Chakravartigal ("ideal universal ruler")	List of Tamil monarchs
Mughal Empire	1526–1857	Padishah ("Master King"); Shahenshah ("King of Kings")	List of Mughal emperors
British Indian Empire	1877–1947	King-Emperor	Emperor of India
East Asia
Imperial China	221 BC–1912	皇帝 (Huángdì) ("Godly Ruler")	List of Chinese emperors
Empire of China (1915–1916)	1915–1916	皇帝 (Huángdì) ("Godly Ruler")	Hongxian Emperor
Manchukuo	1934–1945	皇帝 (Huángdì) ("Godly Ruler")	Datong Emperor
Japan	660 BC-Present	天皇 (Tennō) ("Heavenly Sovereign") 皇帝 (Kōtei) ("Godly Ruler")	List of emperors of Japan
Goryeo	918–1270	聖皇 (Seonghwang) ("Holy Sovereign") 皇帝 (Hwangje) ("Godly Ruler")	List of monarchs of Korea
Korean Empire	1897–1910	皇帝 (Hwangje) ("Godly Ruler")	List of monarchs of Korea
Nanyue	204–125 BC	皇帝 (Hoàng Đế) ("Godly Ruler")	List of Vietnamese emperors
Vạn Xuân	544–602	皇帝 (Hoàng Đế) ("Godly Ruler")	List of Vietnamese emperors
Vietnam	968–1945	皇帝 (Hoàng Đế) ("Godly Ruler")	List of Vietnamese emperors
Other
Rouran Khaganate	330–555	Khagan ("Great Khan")	
Khmer Empire	802–1431	Devarāja ("Godly ruler")	Monarchy of Cambodia
Ottoman Empire	1453–1922	Padishah ("Master King")	List of Ottoman emperors
Mongol Empire	1206–1634	Khagan ("Great Khan")	List of Mongol rulers
Durrani Empire	1747–1823; 1839–1842	Padishah ("Master King")	List of Afghan monarchs

=== Europe ===
Empire	Duration	Title(s)	See
Alexandrian Empire	331 BC–301 BC	Basileus	Alexander the Great
Roman Empire	27 BC–1453	Augustus ("Venerable"); Basileus	List of Roman emperors List of Byzantine emperors
Empire of Nicaea	1204–1261	Basileus	
Empire of Trebizond	1204–1461	Basileus	List of Trapezuntine emperors
Empire of Thessalonica	1224–1242	Basileus	
Latin Empire	1204–1261	Imperator	Latin Emperor
Holy Roman Empire	800–1806	Imperator	Holy Roman Emperor
Avar Khaganate	567–822	Khagan ("Great Khan")	
Bulgarian Empire (First) (Second)	913–1018; 1185–1396	Tsar	List of Bulgarian monarchs
Iberia	1034–1157	Imperator totius Hispaniae	
Serbian Empire	1346–1373	Tsar	List of Serbian monarchs
Russian Tsardom	1547–1721	Tsar	List of Russian monarchs
Russian Empire	1721–1917	Imperator	List of Russian monarchs
Austrian Empire	1804–1867	Kaiser	List of Austrian monarchs
Austro-Hungarian Empire	1867–1918	Kaiser or Király	List of Austrian monarchs List of Hungarian monarchs
German Empire	1871–1918	Kaiser	List of German monarchs
French Empire (First) (Second)	1804–1815; 1852–1870	Empereur	List of French monarchs

=== Americas ===
Empire	Duration	Title	See
Aztec Empire	1375–1521	Hueyi Tlatoani ("great ruler")	List of tlatoque of Tetzcoco
Inca Empire	1438–1533	Sapa Inca ("only ruler")	Pre-Conquest Sapa Incas; Post-Conquest Sapa Incas
Empire of Brazil	1822–1889	Imperador	List of Brazilian monarchs
Empire of Haiti (First) (Second)	1804–1806 1849–1859	Empereur	List of monarchs of Haiti
Mexican Empire (First) (Second)	1822–1823 1864-1867	Emperador	

=== Africa ===
Empire	Duration	Title(s)	See
Ethiopian Empire	1270–1975	Nəgusä nägäst ("ruler of rulers")	List of Ethiopian emperors
Central African Empire	1976–1979	Empereur	Emperor Bokassa

== Self-proclaimed "emperors" ==
See also Self-proclaimed monarchy and micronation

- Yi Ching-ok, "Emperor of the Geum dynasty" (1453)
- Jovan Nenad, "Emperor of Serbs" (1526–1527)
- Andrés Novales, “Emperor of the Philippines” (1823)
- Joshua Abraham Norton, “Emperor of the United States of America” (1859-1880)

== Fictional emperors ==
- Category: Fictional emperors and empresses
