= Chosŏn sanggosa =

1931 Korean history book by Shin Chae-ho

- Hangul: 조선상고사
- Hanja: 朝鮮上古史
- RR: Joseon sanggosa
- MR: Chosŏn sanggosa

Chosŏn sanggosa (Korean: 조선상고사; Hanja: 朝鮮上古史; lit. Ancient History of Korea) is a book written in 1931 by Shin Chae-ho, and which describes the ancient history of Korea. It covers the history of Korea from Gojoseon to the destruction of Baekje. It was published serially in the Korean newspaper The Chosun Ilbo from 1931. It was finally published as a separate volume in 1948. The book consists of eleven chapters.

== See also ==
- History of Korea
- List of books about Korea
- (in Korean) Joseon Sanggosa of wikisource
