= Olga Bay =

Bay of Sea of Japan, Russia

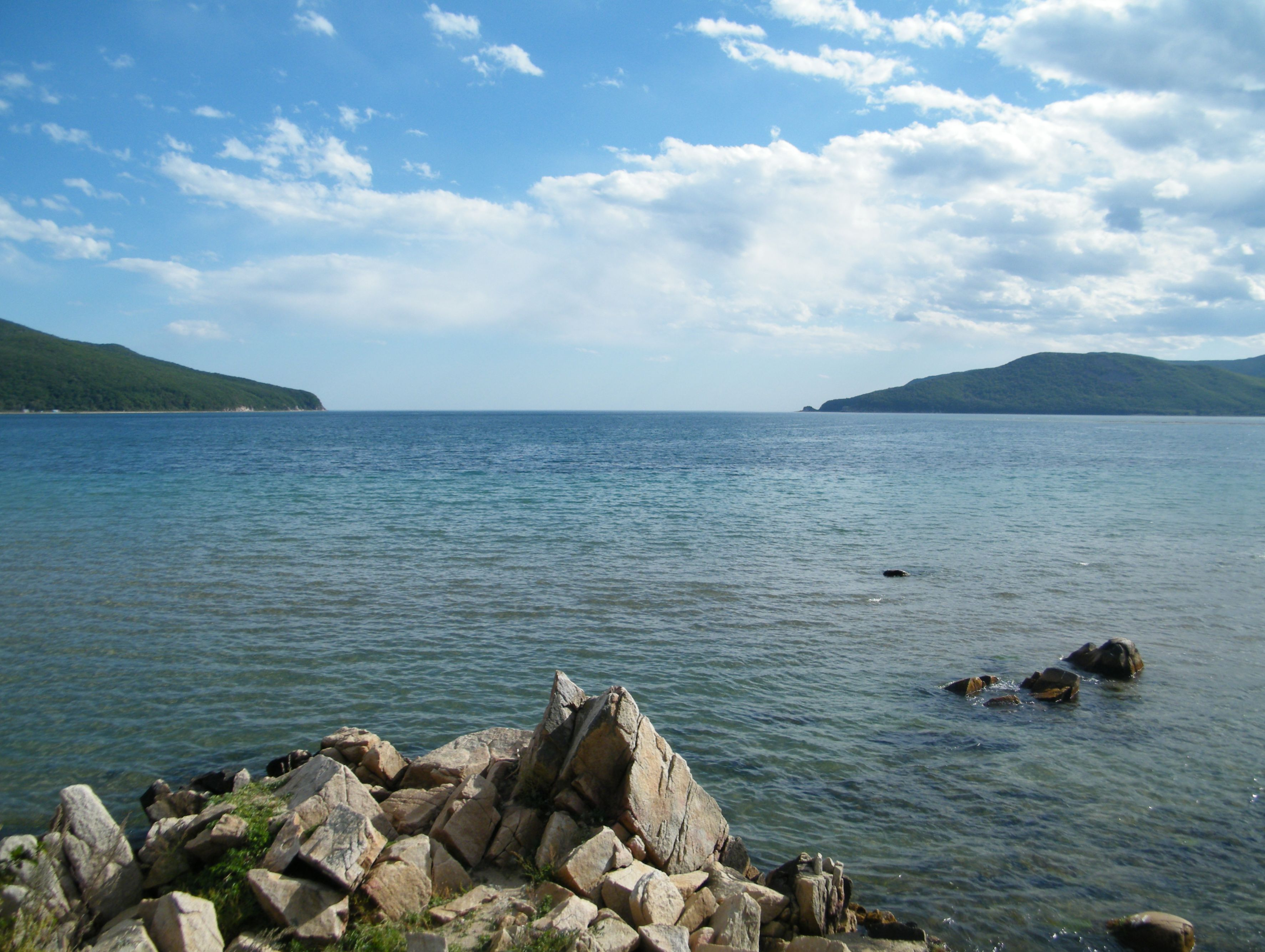
Olga Bay

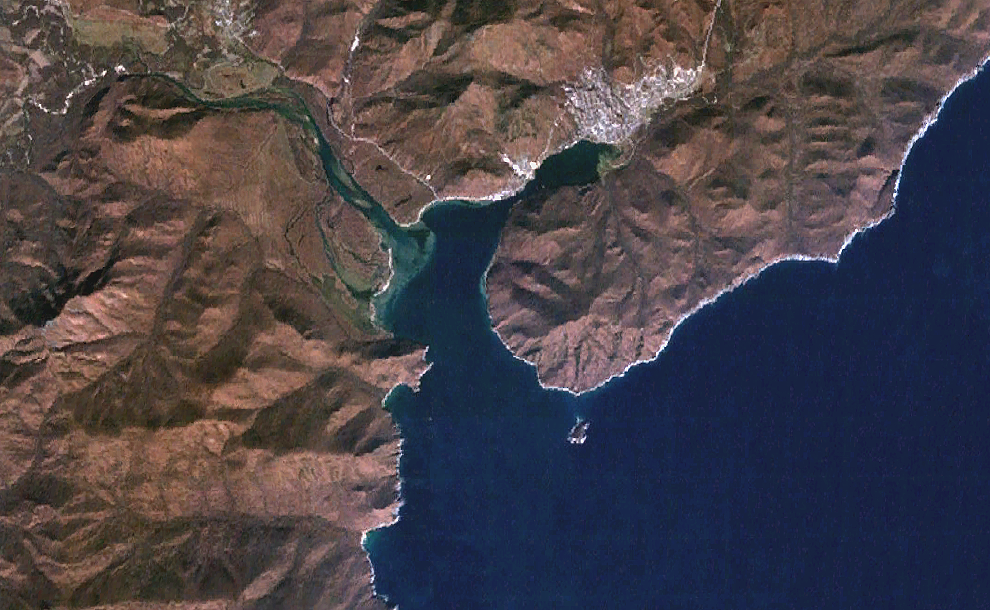
Olga Bay

Olga Bay (Russian: Залив Ольги, 43°41′56″N 135°15′04″E) is a small (11x4 km) mainly ice-free bay in the Sea of Japan on the east coast of Primorsky Krai.

In July 1856, commander Charles Codrington Forsyth of HMS Hornet named the bay "Port Michael Seymour" in honour of Rear-Admiral Sir Michael Seymour, the commander-in-chief of the East Indies and China Station (in office: 1856–1859). In July 1857 Captain Nikolay Matveevich Chikhachyov of the Russian corvette Amerika named this "new bay, not [...] marked on maps" as the "Bay of Saint Olga" after Saint Olga of Kiev. (The previous day Chikhachyov had visited the "Bay of Saint Vladimir" (now "Vladimir Bay") to the north-east of Olga Bay, naming it after Saint Olga's grandson Saint Vladimir.)

The port town of Olga stands on the northern coast of the bay; the Avvakumovka River flows into the bay's western part.

The northern part of Olga Bay - Tihaya Pristan (Russian: Тихая Пристань, lit. 'Calm or Quiet Wharf') - is highly protected from winds and waves.

== See also ==
- Olga Bay Larch
