= Chun of Old Chosŏn =

Last King of Gija Joseon

Chun of Gojoseon

Chinese name
- Traditional Chinese: 準王
- Simplified Chinese: 准王
Transcriptions
Standard Mandarin
- Hanyu Pinyin: Zhǔn Wáng

Korean name
- Hangul: 준왕
- Hanja: 準王
Transcriptions
- Revised Romanization: Jun Wang
- McCune–Reischauer: Chun Wang

Chun (Korean: 준왕; Hanja: 準王) was the last king of Kija Chosŏn according to the Chinese book, Book of the Later Han. He was forcibly succeeded by Wiman (Weiman), whose usurpation of the throne began the dynasty of Wiman Chosŏn of Old Chosŏn.

== Biography ==
According to Chinese accounts such as the Book of Han, it claims that Kija (Jizi), the director ancestor to Chun and the founder of Kija Chosŏn, moved from the Shang dynasty to a foreign land. According to a later Chinese text, Shiji, Kija in fact moved to Korea and founded his own kingdom next to the native Korean kingdom of Old Chosŏn.

Other Chinese accounts such as the Book of the Later Han, state that Chun was the last king of Kija Chosŏn, a possible second dynasty that began after Kija founded his own. Following Kija's name and lineage, King Chun might have used "Ki (箕)" as his family name, but such claim is nowhere to be found.

Traditionally, the genealogy of King Chun is currently disputed by modern historians. In native Korean records, there is no mention of a name "Chun" that ruled over Old Chosŏn, and his records are only found in Chinese sources. In Korean historical tradition, Old Chosŏn was officially succeeded by Wiman Chosŏn with no mention of Kija Chosŏn except for an allusion found in the 13th century Samguk yusa, though the dates are highly fantastical and often ignored by modern historians.

== Alleged usurpation by Wiman ==
According to the Chinese text Book of the Later Han, Wiman entered Old Chosŏn as a refugee, and submitted to King Chun. Chun granted Wiman's request to serve as a commander of the western borders.

The Book of the Later Han describes Wiman revolting against King Chun's Kija Chosŏn, and successfully usurping the throne to found his new dynasty, the Wiman Chosŏn.

== Supposed exile to Mahan confederacy ==
Sometime around 194–193 BCE after Wiman's revolt, King Chun and his followers headed down into the southern part of the Korean peninsula. According to the myth, the Mahan confederacy was founded and King Chun became its first sovereign.

However, the original source, the Book of the Later Han's claim did not clearly state which kingdom of Korea King Chun established, with it being described as the "King of Han (韓王)". It was only associated with Mahan based on later assumptions such as geographical proximity.

Currently, historians from both Koreas (North and South) suspect an attempt of sinicization (similar to Jinhan with Qin dynasty; see Jinhan confederacy's misconceptions) and reject the existence of Jizi (Kija) and Kija Chosŏn within history of Korea, thus in turn, rejecting the stories found about King Chun (the supposed last ruler of Kija Chosŏn) and his alleged exile to Mahan confederacy. Since Wiman Chosŏn's existence is considered more likely than Kija Chosŏn, and that Wiman did overthrow the previous dynasty, it is deduced that a king of the original dynasty (Old Chosŏn) met the same demise as Chun and may have been exiled as well.

== See also ==
- List of Korean monarchs
- History of Korea

== Bibliography ==
- Cotterell, Arthur (2011). Asia: A Concise History. Singapore: Wiley. ISBN 978-0470825044.
- Kim, Jinwung (2012). A History of Korea: From "Land of the Morning Calm" to States in Conflict. Indiana University Press. ISBN 978-0253000248.
- Peterson, Mark; Margulies, Phillip (2009). A Brief History of Korea. New York: Infobase Publishing. ISBN 978-1-4381-2738-5.
- Shim, Jae-hoon (2002), "A New Understanding of Kija Chosŏn as a Historical Anachronism", Journal of Asian Studies, 62 (2): 271–305, doi:10.2307/4126600, JSTOR 4126600.
- Tennant, Roger (1996). History Of Korea. Routledge. ISBN 978-0710305329.
- Xu, Stella Yingzi (2007). That glorious ancient history of our nation. University of California, Los Angeles. ISBN 9780549440369.

Chun of Old Chosŏn House of Gojoseon Died: 194 BC
Regnal titles
Preceded by King Bu	King of Gojoseon c. 220 BC – 194 BC	Succeeded by Wiman
