= List of acronyms: L =

This list contains acronyms, initialisms, and pseudo-blends that begin with the letter L.

For the purposes of this list:

- acronym = an abbreviation pronounced as if it were a word, e.g., SARS = severe acute respiratory syndrome, pronounced to rhyme with cars
- initialism = an abbreviation pronounced wholly or partly using the names of its constituent letters, e.g., CD = compact disc, pronounced cee dee
- pseudo-blend = an abbreviation whose extra or omitted letters mean that it cannot stand as a true acronym, initialism, or portmanteau (a word formed by combining two or more words).

(a) = acronym, e.g.: SARS – (a) severe acute respiratory syndrome
(i) = initialism, e.g.: CD – (i) compact disc
(p) = pseudo-blend, e.g.: UNIFEM – (p) United Nations Development Fund for Women
(s) = symbol (none of the above, representing and pronounced as something else; for example: MHz – megahertz)

Some terms are spoken as either acronym or initialism, e.g., VoIP, pronounced both as voyp and V-O-I-P.

(Main list of acronyms)

- L – (s) Fifty (in Roman numerals) – (i) Label – Lap – Large – Laser (US military aircraft basic mission designation) – Latin – Left – (s) Litre – (i) Low (transmissions)

== LA ==
- l8r, g8r – (a) later, gator
- la – (s) Latin language (ISO 639-1 code)
- La – (s) Lanthanum
- LA
  - (s) Laos (FIPS 10-4 country code; ISO 3166 digram)
  - Louisiana (postal symbol)
  - (i) Los Angeles
- LAAS
  - (i) Local Area Augmentation System
  - Los Angeles Astronomical Society
- LAB – (a) Logistics Assault Base
- LabVIEW – (p) Laboratory Virtual Instrumentation Engineering Workbench
- LACMA – (a/i) Los Angeles County Museum of Art
- LAD – (a) Laser Aiming Device
- LADW – (i) Local Air Defence Warning
- LAESI – (i) Local Authority & Emergency Service Information
- LAK – (s) Laotian kip (ISO 4217 currency code)
- LAMP – (multiple meanings)
- LAN – (a) Local Area Network
- LANL – (i) Los Alamos National Laboratory
- lao – (s) Lao language (ISO 639-2 code)
- LAO – (s) Laos (ISO 3166 trigram)
- LAPD – (i) Los Angeles Police Department
- LAR
  - Light Armoured Reconnaissance
  - Logistics Assistance Representative
- LARC – (a) Livermore Advanced Research Computer (cf. LLNL)
- LARP – (a) Live-Action Role-Playing
- LAS – (s) McCarran International Airport (Las Vegas, Nevada)
- Laser – (a) Light Amplification by Stimulated Emission of Radiation (cf. Maser)
- lat – (s) Latin language (ISO 639-2 code)
- LAT
  - (i/a) Lowest Astronomical Tide (nautical charts)
  - Licensed Athletic Trainer (used in many of the United States; see www.oata.org)
- LATA – (i) Local Access Transport Area
- LATCH – (p) Lower Anchors and Tethers for Children (U.S. standard for attachment points for child safety seats in passenger cars)
- lav – (s) Latvian language (ISO 639-2 code)
- LAV
  - (a) Land Assault Vehicle
  - Light Armoured Vehicle
  - Lymphadenopathy-Associated Virus
- LAW] – (a) Light Antitank Weapon
- LAX
  - (s) Los Angeles International Airport
  - (i) The Latin American Xchange (professional wrestling)

== LB ==
- lb
  - (s) pound (Latin librum)
  - Luxembourgish language (ISO 639-1 code)
- LB – (s) Lebanon (ISO 3166 digram)
- LBH
  - (i) Light Battlefield Helicopter
  - Lyman-Birge-Hopfield bands
- LBJ
  - (i) Lady Bird Johnson
  - LeBron James
  - Light Bulb Joke
  - Little Beagle Johnson (the dog owned by Lyndon and Lady Bird Johnson)
  - Lyndon Baines Johnson
- LBN – (s) Lebanon (ISO 3166 trigram)
- LBNL – (i) Lawrence Berkeley National Laboratory
- LBP – (s) Lebanese pound (ISO 4217 currency code)
- LBR – (s) Liberia (ISO 3166 trigram)
- LBS – (i) Location-based service
- lbs – (s) pounds (plural form of lb, see above)
- LBT – (i) Large Binocular Telescope
- LBW – (i) Leg Before Wicket
- LBY – (s) Libya (ISO 3166 trigram)

== LC ==
- LC – (i) Line of Contact – (s) Saint Lucia (ISO 3166 digram)
- LC2IEDM or LC^{2}IEDM – (i) Land C2IEDM (q.v.)
- LCA
  - (s) Saint Lucia (ISO 3166 trigram)
  - Larnaca International Airport
- LCC – (i) Land Component Commander
- LCCP – (i) Light Contingency Communications Package
- LCD – (i) Liquid Crystal Display
- LCE – (i) Leaving Certificate Examination – Load Carrying Equipment – London Commodity Exchange
- LCM – (i) Least/Lowest Common Multiple
- LCol – (s) Lieutenant-Colonel (Canada, UK)
- LCS - League of Legends Championship Series

== LD ==
- LD
  - (i) Laser Designator
  - Limited Deployment
  - Line of Departure
- LDA – (i) Lateral Drift Apparatus (paratroops)
- LDAP – (a/i) Lightweight Directory Access Protocol (pronounced "ell-dap")
- LDC – (i) Lesser Developing/Developed Country
- LDE - (s) Tarbes–Lourdes–Pyrénées Airport (IATA code)
- LDL – (i) Low-Density Lipoprotein
- LDMOS – (i/a) Laterally diffused MOS transistor ("ell-dee-moss")
- LDS
  - (i) Latter-day Saint (also "Latter Day Saint"); also used as an abbreviation by the Church of Jesus Christ of Latter-day Saints
  - Liberal Democracy of Slovenia
- LDV – (i) Local Defence Volunteers (British Home Guard)
- LDW – Lane Departure Warning (ADAS)

== LE ==
- LE – (s) Lebanon (FIPS 10-4 country code)
- LEC – (i) Local Exchange Carrier
- LED – (i) Light-Emitting Diode
- Legs – (a) level emotion gad speed
- LEGAD – (p) Legal Advice
- LEMOSS – (p) Long-Endurance MObile Submarine Simulator
- LEN – (i) Large Extension Node
- LEO – (a) Low Earth orbit
- LEP – (a) Large Electron-Positron collider
- LER – (i) Loss-Exchange Ratio
- LEU – (i) Low-Enriched Uranium

== LF ==
- LF – (i) Low Frequency
- LFG - Let's F***ing Go! (Internet slang)
- LFO – (i) Low Frequency Oscillation / Oscillator
- LFTR – (i) Liquid fluoride thorium reactor

== LG ==
- lg – (s) Luganda (ISO 639-1 code)
- LG – (s) Latvia (FIPS 10-4 country code)
- LGB
  - (i) Lesbian, Gay, Bisexual
  - Laser-guided bomb, self-explanatory
- LGBT – (i) Lesbian, Gay, Bisexual, Transgender
  - LGBTI - Lesbian, Gay, Bi, Transgender, Intersex
  - LGBTQ - Lesbian, Gay, Bi, Transgender, Queer
  - LGBTQIA - the A standing for "asexual", "aromantic", or "agender"
- LGLO – (i) Love God, Love Others
- LGLO's – (i) Latino Greek Lettered Organizations
- LGM
  - (i) Little Green Men
  - (s) Land-based Guided Missile, US military designation for guided missiles launched from ground silos, mostly used to talk about ICBMs like LGM-30 Minuteman
- LGS – (i) Landsat Ground Station

== LH ==
- LH
  - (s) Lithuania (FIPS 10-4 country code)
  - (i) Luteinising Hormone
  - Lufthansa (IATA airline code)
- LHC – (i) Large Hadron Collider
- LHD
  - (i) litterarum humaniorum doctor (Latin, "doctor of humane letters (humanities)")
  - Left-Hand Drive (automobile)
  - (s) Landing Helicopter Dock (US Navy hull classification symbol)
- LHS – (i) Left Hand Side

== LI ==
- li – (s) Limburgish language (ISO 639-1 code)
- Li – (s) Lithium
- LI – (s) Fifty-one (in Roman numerals) – (s) Liberia (FIPS 10-4 country code) – Liechtenstein (ISO 3166 digram)
- Libor – (p) London Interbank Offered Rate
- LIBS – (a) Laser Induced Breakdown Spectroscopy
- LIE – (s) Liechtenstein (ISO 3166 trigram)
- LIFO – (a) Last In, First Out
- LIGO – (a) Laser Interferometer Gravitational-Wave Observatory
- LIJ – (i) Los Ingobernables de Japón (Spanish, "The Ungovernables of Japan"), Japanese professional wrestling stable
- lim – (s) Limburgish language (ISO 639-2 code)
- lin – (s) Lingala language (ISO 639-2 code)
- LINEAR – (a) Lincoln Near-Earth Asteroid Research
- LiP, LIP – (s) Lithium ion polymer battery
- LISA – (a) Laser Interferometer Space Antenna
- lit – (s) Lithuanian language (ISO 639-2 code)
- LITAS – (a) Low Intensity Two Colour Approach System (aviation)
- LIVE – (a) Liquid Inertial Vibration Eliminator

== LJ ==
- LJ
  - (i) La Jolla
  - Larry Johnson (both the American football and basketball players of that name)
  - LaserJet (HP printer brand)
  - Library Journal
  - Linux Journal
  - LiveJournal
  - Ljubljana
  - Lord Justice of Appeal
  - (s) Sierra National Airlines (IATA code)
- LJJ – (i) Lord Justices of Appeal

== LK ==
- LK – (s) Sri Lanka (ISO 3166 digram)
- LKA – (s) Sri Lanka (ISO 3166 trigram)
- LKL – (i) Lietuvos krepšinio lyga (Lithuanian, "Lithuanian Basketball League")
- LKR – (s) Sri Lanka rupee (ISO 4217 currency code)
- LKR4 – (s) Linkwitz-Riley 4th order (audio crossover type)

== LL ==
- l. l. – loco laudato (Latin: "in the place quoted")
- LL
  - (i) Land Line (telephone)
  - (i) Last Log
  - (i) Late Latin
  - (s) Laws, esp. both Laws
  - (i) Left Limit
  - (i) Lex Luthor (Superman character)
  - (i) Light Line
  - (i) Limited Liability
  - (s) Lines** (i) Linked List
  - (i) Little League
  - (i) Low Latin
  - (p) Liberland
- LLAD – (i) Low Level Air Defence
- LLB – (i) Legum Baccalaureus (Latin: Bachelor of Laws)
- LLC – (i) Limited Liability Company
- LLGC – (i) Llyfrgell Genedlaethol Cymru (National Library of Wales) – London Lesbian and Gay Centre
- LLLTV – (i) Low-Light Level Television
- LLNL – (i) Lawrence Livermore National Laboratory
- LLP – (i) Limited Liability Partnership
- LLTI – (i) Limiting Long-Term Illness – Long Lead Time Item
- LLTR – (i) Low-Level Transit Route

== LM ==
- LMAO – (i) Laughing My Ass Off (Internet shorthand)
- LMFAO – (i) Laughing My F**king Ass Off (Internet shorthand, electro-hop duo)
- LMB – (i) Lick My Balls
- LMN – (a/i) Lifetime Movie Network
- LMS – (i) London Mathematical Society – London, Midland and Scottish (Railway)
- LMS – (i) Like My Status (Internet shorthand)
- LMV - () Light Motor Vehicle

== LN ==
- ln
  - (s) Lingala language (ISO 639-1 code)
  - Natural logarithm
- LNB
  - (i) Liga Nacional de Básquet (Rioplatense Spanish, "National Basketball League"; top Argentine league)
  - Ligue Nationale de Basketball (French, "National Basketball League"; the organization that operates France's top two leagues, and the unrelated top league of Switzerland)
  - Low-Noise Block (Satellite dish)
- LNER
  - (i) London and North Eastern Railway railway operator from 1923 until 1947 in the United Kingdom
  - (i) London North Eastern Railway railway operator established in 2018 in the United Kingdom
- LNG – (i) Liquefied Natural Gas
- LNO – (p) Liaison Officer
- LNR – (i) Ligue Nationale de Rugby (French, "National Rugby League")

== LO ==
- lo – (s) Lao language (ISO 639-1 code)
- LO – (s) Slovakia (FIPS 10-4 country code)
- LOA – (i) Limit Of Advance
- LOC
  - (a/i) Level of Operational Capability
  - Limited Operational Capability
  - Lines Of Code
  - Lines Of Communication
  - see entry
- LOD
  - (i) Legion of Doom, referring to any of the following:
    - A group of DC Comics supervillains
    - A hacker group
    - A group of Philadelphia Flyers ice hockey players in the 1990s
    - The Road Warriors, a professional wrestling tag team that used the name "Legion of Doom" when performing in the WWF/WWE
  - Limit of Detection – see Detection limit
- LoD – (i) Lines of Development (UK)
- LOFAR – (p) Low Frequency Analyzer and Recorder / Low Frequency Analysis and Recording in sonar systems
- LOGPAC – (p) Logistics Package
- LOL – (i) Laughing Out Loud (Internet shorthand)
- LOMEZ – (p) Low Altitude Missile Engagement Zone
- LONEOS – (a) Lowell Observatory Near-Earth-Object Search
- LOOGY – (p/a) Lefty One-Out GuY, a sometimes pejorative nickname for the left-handed specialist in baseball
- loq – (p) loquitur (Latin, "(s) he speaks")
- LORTID – (p) LOng Range Target IDentification
- LORAN – (p) LOng RAnge Navigation
- LOS – (i) Line Of Sight
- LOSAT – (i) Line-Of-Sight Anti-Tank (missile)
- LOTA – (i) Licentiate of the Orthodontic Technicians Association
- LOTIS – (a) Livermore Optical Transient Imaging System
- LOTR or LotR – (a) Lord of the Rings
- LOTS – (a) Logistics Over-The-Shore

== LP ==
- LP
  - (i) Linkin Park
  - Linkup Point
  - Listening Post
  - Long Playing (record)
  - Louisiana Pacific (cf. LP Field, a former name of the sports venue now known as Nissan Stadium)
- LPC – (i) Linear Predictive Coding
- LPD
  - (i) Landing Platform Dock (Navy hull classification)
  - Low Probability of Detection
- LPG – (i) Liquefied Petroleum Gas (cf. LNG)
- LPI – (i) Low Probability of Intercept
- LPS
  - (i) Landsat Processing System
  - (p) LipoPolySaccharide

== LQ ==
- LQ – (s) Palmyra Atoll (FIPS 10-4 territory code)

== LR ==
- Lr – (s) Lawrencium
- LR – (s) Liberia (ISO 3166 digram)
- LRAD – (i) Long Range Acoustic Device ("ell-rad")
- LRAS3 or LRAS^{3} – (i) Long Range Advanced Scout Surveillance System
- LR-ATGW – (i) Long-Range Anti-Tank Guided Weapon
- LRC – (i) Logistics Readiness Center
- LRD – (s) Liberian dollar (ISO 4217 currency code)
- LRF – (p) Laser rangefinder – (i) Low Readiness Forces
- LRGW – (i) Long-Range Guided Weapon
- LRICBM – (i) Limited Range ICBM
- LRIP – (i) Low Rate Initial Production
- LRP – (i) Logistics Release Point
- LRPE – (i) Long-Range Planning Element
- LRS – (i) Long Range Surveillance
- LRU – (i) Line-Replaceable Unit

== LS ==
- L.S. – (i) Lectori Salutem (Latin, "greetings to the reader"; when the name of the reader is not known in advance)
- LS
  - (i) Landing Support
  - (s) Lesotho (ISO 3166 digram)
  - Liechtenstein (FIPS 10-4 country code)
  - (i) locus sigilli (Latin, "place of the seal")
- LSAT – (i) Law School Admission Test (often pronounced as "el-SAT")
- LSD
  - (i) Landing Ship, Dock (Navy hull classification)
  - librae, solidii, denarii (Latin: Pounds, shillings and pence)
  - lyserg-saüre-dietylamid (German "lysergic acid diethylamide")
- LSE
  - (i) Least Squares Estimate/Error
  - London School of Economics
  - London Stock Exchange
- LSI – (i) Large-Scale Integration
- LSIF – (i) Labour Sponsored Investment Fund
- LSL – (s) Lesotho loti (ISO 4217 currency code)
- LSND – (i) Liquid Scintillator Neutrino Detector
- LSO – (s) Lesotho (ISO 3166 trigram)
- LSST – (i) Large Synoptic Survey Telescope
- LST – (i) Landing Ship, Tank (World War II; also known, not entirely affectionately, as "Large Slow Target")
- LSVW – (i) Light Support Vehicle, Wheeled

== LT ==
- lt – (s) Lithuanian language (ISO 639-1 code)
- Lt – (s) Lieutenant
- LtC – (s) Lieutenant-Colonel (U.S.)
- LT – (s) Lesotho (FIPS 10-4 country code) – Lithuania (ISO 3166 digram)
- LTC – (i) Long-Term Costing
- Ltd – (s) Limited
- LTDP – (i) Long-Term Defence Plan
- LTG – (s) Lieutenant General – (i) Lightning (METAR Code)
- LTI – (i) Linear Time-Invariant
- LTL – (s) Lithuanian litas (ISO 4217 currency code)
- LTM – (i) Acronym for Laughing To Myself
- LTO - (i) Long Term Occasional (substitute teachers)
- LTP – (i) Long-Term Potentiation
- LTU – (s) Lithuania (ISO 3166 trigram)
- ltz – (s) Luxembourgish language (ISO 639-2 code)

== LU ==
- lu – (s) Tshiluba language (ISO 639-1 code)
- Lu – (s) Lutetium
- LU
  - (i) Lefèvre Utile, a French brand of biscuits/cookies
  - Loonatics Unleashed
  - Love You
- lub – (s) Tshiluba language (ISO 639-2 code)
- LUCA – (a) Last Universal Common Ancestor
- lug – (s) Luganda (ISO 639-2 code)
- LUG – (i) Linux User Group
- LULU – (a) Locally Unwanted Land Use (urbanism)
- LUT – (i) Limited User Test (ing) – Local User Terminal
- LUVW – (i) Light Utility Vehicle, Wheeled
- LUX – (s) Luxembourg (ISO 3166 trigram)

== LV ==
- lv – (s) Latvian language (ISO 639-1 code)
- LV
  - (i) Las Vegas
  - (s) Latvia (ISO 3166 digram)
  - (i) Launch Vehicle
  - Leading Vehicle
  - (s) Leave
  - (i) Left Ventricle
  - Level Valve
  - Linking Verb
  - Liverpool Victoria
- LVA – (s) Latvia (ISO 3166 trigram)
- LVAD
  - (i) Left Ventricular Assist Device
  - (p) Low-Velocity Airdrop
- LVEF – (i) Left Ventricular Ejection Fraction
- LVL – (s) Latvian lats (ISO 4217 currency code)

== LW ==
- Lw – (s) Lawrencium (obsolete 1963)
- LW
  - (i) Land Warrior
  - Low Water (nautical charts)
- LWO - (i) Latino World Order (professional wrestling stable from WWE
- LWR
  - (i) Laser warning receiver
  - Light-water reactor (type of nuclear reactor)
- LWRC – (i) Land Warfare Resources Corporation
- LWS – (i) Land Warrior System

== LX ==
- LX – (s) Luxembourg (amateur radio ITU prefix) – Swiss International Air Lines (IATA code)
- LX – (p) Electrics (theatrical term)

== LY ==
- LY – (s) Libya (FIPS 10-4 country code; ISO 3166 digram) – Lithuania (amateur radio ITU prefix)
- LYAO – Laugh Your Ass Off
- LYD – (s) Libyan dinar (ISO 4217 currency code)
- LYLAS – (a) Love You Like A Sister

== LZ ==
- LZ – (s) Bulgaria (amateur radio ITU prefix) – (i) Landing Zone
