= LS1 =

LS1 may refer to:

== Places ==
- MACS J1149 Lensed Star 1 - most distant star detected, sometimes abbreviated to "LS1" (MACS J1149 LS1)
- Central Leeds postcode (LS1), England, UK
- Launch Site 1, see Launch Complex 1 (disambiguation)
  - Blue Origin Launch Site One, Corn Ranch, Texas, USA

== Transportation and vehicular ==
=== Automotive ===
- GM LS engine series model LS1
- Saturn LS1, a sedan from U.S. automotive marque Saturn
- Lavaggi LS1, an LMP-1 class racing prototype sports car

=== Aviation ===
- Nexaer LS1, American light-sport aircraft
- Rolladen-Schneider LS1, German sailplane glider aircraft

== Other uses ==
- Landsat 1, satellite abbreviated to LS-1

== See also ==
- Ls(1)
- LSL (disambiguation)
- LSI (disambiguation)
- LS (disambiguation)
