= LMS =

LMS may refer to:

== Academic degrees ==
- Licentiate in Mediaeval Studies, a degree of the Pontifical Institute of Mediaeval Studies in Toronto, Canada
- Licentiate in Medicine and Surgery, a degree in India

== Science and technology ==
- Labeled magnitude scale, a scaling technique
- Learning management system, education software
- Least mean squares filter, producing least mean square error
- Leiomyosarcoma, a rare form of cancer
- Lenz microphthalmia syndrome
- Computerised Library management system
- LMS color space
- Laboratory information management system (usually LIMS)

== Organisations ==
- Latin Mass Society of England and Wales
- List of Marjan Šarec, a Slovenian political party
- Lithuanian Mathematical Society
- London Mathematical Society
- London, Midland and Scottish Railway
- London Missionary Society
- League of Legends Master Series
- Loving Municipal Schools

== Entertainment ==
- Last man standing (video games), a mode of video games
- LMS, family band of Denroy Morgan

== Culture ==
- Looks, Money, Status, a rating framework in the incelosphere
- Loïc Mbe Soh, French footballer

== Locations ==
- Leamington Spa railway station code, England
- LMS, Moscow, a settlement in the Troitsky Administrative Okrug, Moscow

== Schemes ==
- Local Mitigation Strategy
- Local Management of Schools, in the Education Reform Act 1988

== Other uses ==
- Lyrion Music Server, formerly Logitech Media Server
- LS, disambiguation page
