= LSO =

LSO may refer to:

== People ==
- Landing signal officer or landing safety officer on an aircraft carrier
- Legal Services Officer, of the Singapore Legal Service

== Places ==
- Lesotho (ISO 3166-1 alpha-3 code LSO), a country in Africa
- Les Sables-d'Olonne - Talmont Airport (IATA airport code LSO), Vendée, Pays de la Loire, France; see List of airports in France

== Computing ==
- Large segment offload, a technology for reducing CPU overhead
- Local shared object, an HTTP cookie-like data entity used by Adobe Flash Player
- Location search optimization, a web optimization method

== Organisations ==
- Law Society of Ontario, the regulatory body for lawyers in Ontario, Canada (formerly called the Law Society of Upper Canada)
- London School of Osteopathy, an osteopathic school in London, England
- LSO (company), a delivery company formerly known as Lonestar Overnight

=== Orchestras ===
- Lancaster Symphony Orchestra, Pennsylvania, USA
- Lansing Symphony Orchestra, Michigan, USA
- Liepāja Symphony Orchestra, Latvia
- Limburg Symphony Orchestra or Limburgs Symfonie Orkest, a Dutch orchestra
- London Symphony Orchestra, a United Kingdom symphony orchestra
- Longwood Symphony Orchestra, Massachusetts, USA
- Lucerne Symphony Orchestra, Switzerland
- Lubbock Symphony Orchestra, Texas, USA

== Other uses ==
- Laotian sign languages (ISO 639 code lso), of Laos, in Southeast Asia
- Lateral superior olive, an auditory nucleus in the brainstem
- Long Service and Good Conduct Order (LSO), one of the orders, decorations, and medals of Rwanda
- Lutetium orthosilicate, an inorganic scintillator

== See also ==
- ISO (disambiguation)
