= Phato v Attorney-General =

South African legal case

In Phato v Attorney-General, Eastern Cape & Another; Commissioner of the South African Police Services v Attorney-General, Eastern Cape & Others, in two applications, which were combined for the purposes of the judgment, the issue was the right of an accused to access to the police docket relating to the accused's impending trial in a magistrate's court on a charge under the Witchcraft Suppression Act 3 of 1957.

In the first application, the applicant was the accused, who contended that he was entitled to this information by virtue of the provisions of section 23 and section 25(3) of the Constitution.

In the second application, the applicant was the Commissioner of SAPS who wished for an order declaring that the privilege which existed in respect of the contents of police dockets immediately prior to the commencement of the Constitution was not repealed or amended by section 23, but that the accused was entitled before trial only to copies of all medical, hospital and autopsy reports; summaries of other expert evidence to be tendered by the State; and copies of all documents relating to identification parades.

The Commissioner argued that the State was only required to furnish an accused with such information as he required, in the narrow sense, to exercise his right to a fair trial, i.e. a trial in an adversarial system of litigation which recognised various privileges from having to disclose certain information to the other side as being paramount to its proper operation. This included the docket privilege of South African law.

The court held that the practices of the past whereby the State retained tight control of almost all available information relevant to a criminal prosecution was inconsistent with modern values of openness and accountability in a democratically oriented administration.

Thus the court held that section 23 gave an accused the right to access to the information contained in the police docket for the exercise and protection of his right to a fair criminal trial.

The Commissioner argued that the judgment in R v Stinchcombe permitted non-disclosure of witness statements on grounds of privilege, and that this privilege included South African docket privilege.

The court held that, whereas in Canada, the state had a discretion to withhold information which would ordinarily be disclosed, the South African Constitution's inclusion of section 23 meant that there was a protected right to information.

The court thus ordered that the respondents furnish the applicant with witness statements, and all exhibits, plans and diagrams in the police docket, if any, and give the applicant access to the remaining information in the docket.

== Notes ==
- Phato v Attorney-General, Eastern Cape and Another; Commissioner of the South African Police Services v Attorney-General, Eastern Cape and Others 1995 (1) SA 799 (E); 1994 (2) SACR 734; 1994 (5) BCLR 99; [1994] 3 LRC 506
