= LRR =

LRR may refer to:

- Laminated root rot, a root disease in conifers
- Leucine-rich repeat, a type of protein domain
- LoadingReadyRun, a Canadian comedy troupe
- Long Range Radar
- Long River Review, a literary magazine of the University of Connecticut
- Low rolling resistance tires, a type of tires designed for fuel efficiency
- Light Reaction Regiment, the Philippine Army counter-terrorist unit modeled after the U.S. Army Delta Force and British SAS
- Loose Round Robin, Warp Scheduling

== See also ==
- LR (disambiguation)
- LRRR (disambiguation)
