= LQTM =

LQTM or variation, may refer to:

- linear quantum Turing machine, a type of quantum Turing machine
- lqtm (laughing quietly to myself), a texting abbreviation

== See also ==
- LQ (disambiguation), including trademarks "LQ" (i.e. LQ™)
