= LF =

LF or Lf may refer to:

== Arts and entertainment ==
- LF (album), by Raymond Lam
- Laxius Force, a role-playing video game trilogy
- Libby Folfax, a character in Jimmy Neutron: Boy Genius
- Lifeforce (film), a 1985 film directed by Tobe Hooper
- Salamander (video game), an arcade game retitled Life Force

== Companies and organisations ==
- LeapFrog Enterprises, an educational toy company
- Lebanese Forces, a Lebanese political party
- Li & Fung, a company of Hong Kong
- Linux Foundation, a non-profit organization for the promotion of Linux
- LoveFilm, UK-based provider of home video and video game rental through DVD-by-mail and streaming video on demand
- People's Life First, a Japanese political party
- FlyNordic (IATA airline designator LF), a defunct Swedish airline
- Nippon Broadcasting System, also known as JOLF, a radio station in Tokyo, Japan
- LF Corporation, a South Korean fashion company

== Places ==
- Lakeland, Florida
- Livermore Falls, Maine
- Lambeau Field, a stadium in Green Bay, Wisconsin and the home of the Green Bay Packers

== Science and technology ==
=== Biology and medicine ===
- Lactoferrin, a protein
- Lassa fever, a type of viral hemorrhagic fever
- Lateral flow test, an immunologic test
- Lymphatic filariasis, a disease common in tropical regions
- L.f., taxonomic author abbreviation of Carl Linnaeus the Younger (1741–1783), Swedish naturalist

=== Logic and information theory ===
- Lexical function, a tool for the description of semantic relationships
- Logical form, the abstract form of a set of sentences in logic
- Logical form (linguistics), a level of syntactic representation
- Logical framework, in automated theorem proving
  - LF (logical framework), a particular logical framework

=== Other uses in science and technology ===
- Missile launch facility, a structure used for launching ballistic missiles
- Limestone filler, used in cement and concrete fabrication
- Line feed character, in typing and computing; also called newline, line break, or end-of-line
- Lineal foot, a measurement of length without regard to width
- Load factor (disambiguation)
- Logic File, a logic file category
- London forces, a type of intermolecular forces
- Low frequency, a radio frequency between 30 and 300 kHz

== Other uses ==
- Laissez-faire, a concept in economics
- Left fielder, a defensive position in baseball
- Left Front (disambiguation)
- Lexus LF, a concept automobile
- LF-routes, a network of long-distance cycling routes in the Netherlands and Belgium
