= Search optimization =

Search optimization may refer to:

- Local search (optimization), a heuristic method for solving computationally hard optimization problems
- Location search optimization (LSO), improving the visibility of a website through location-enabled devices
- Search and optimization, searches that begin with some form of a guess and then refine the guess incrementally
- Search engine optimization, the process of improving the online visibility of a website

== See also ==
- Pattern search (optimization), a family of numerical optimization methods that does not require a gradient
