= Lifecycle management =

Lifecycle management or life-cycle management may refer to:

- Application lifecycle management in software
- Building lifecycle management, the design and construction of buildings
- Engineering lifecycle management, a product and software development platform by IBM
- Information lifecycle management, in computer data storage
- Plant lifecycle management, in industrial facility management
- Product lifecycle management (marketing)
- Product lifecycle management, in engineering and manufacturing
- Virtual machine lifecycle management, in computer systems administration

== See also ==
- LCM (disambiguation)
- Life-cycle assessment
