= IMV =

IMV may stand for:

== Medicine ==
- Inferior mesenteric vein
- Intermittent mechanical ventilation

== Other ==
- Industrija motornih vozil, a car manufacturer in Slovenia
- Infantry mobility vehicle
- Toyota IMV platform

== See also ==
- im5
- 1MV
- LMV (disambiguation)
- MV (disambiguation)
