= Lomez =

Lomez could refer to:

- Jonathan Keeperman, American publisher
- Celine Lomez (born 1953), Canadian actress and singer
- Lomez, a minor character in Seinfeld; see List of Seinfeld characters#Unseen characters
- Low Altitude Missile Engagement Zone; see List of acronyms: L
