= Below Zero =

Below Zero may refer to:

- Below Zero (1930 film), a 1930 Laurel and Hardy film
- Below Zero (2011 film), a 2011 film
- Below Zero (2021 film), a 2021 film
- Below Zero (Robert Rich album)
- Below Zero (Waltari album), 2009
- Subnautica: Below Zero, a video game and sequel to Subnautica, developed by Unknown Worlds Entertainment

== See also ==
- Less than Zero (disambiguation)
