= Lug =

Lug or LUG may refer to:

== Places ==
=== Bosnia and Herzegovina ===
- Lug (Bugojno), a village
- Lug (Derventa), a suburb in Bosanska Posavina
- Lug, Jablanica, a village
- Lug (Kiseljak), a village
- Lug, Prozor, a village
- Lug, Tomislavgrad, a village

=== Croatia ===
- Lug, Bilje, a settlement in Croatian Baranja
- Lug, Karlovac County, a village
- Lug Zabočki, a village near Zabok
- Lug Samoborski, a village near Samobor
- Crni Lug, Croatia, a village near Delnice
- Čađavički Lug, a village near Čađavica
- Mali Lug, a village near Čabar
- Poljanski Lug, a village near Vrbovec

=== Ireland ===
- Lug, a townland in Durrow, County Offaly, barony of Ballycowan
- Lugnaquilla, a mountain often abbreviated as Lug

=== Serbia ===
- Lug (Bajina Bašta), a village
- Lug (Beočin), a village

=== Elsewhere ===
- Lug, Germany, a municipality in Südwestpfalz district, Rhineland-Palatinate
- Ług, Łódź Voivodeship, a village in Poland

== Handles or connectors ==
- Lug (electrical connector), a bolt on an enclosure tied to an electric potential within the enclosure, supporting the connection of a cable
- A protrusion used to carry or attach an object:
  - Lug (hinge), a protuberance of a hinge, featuring a hole for the axis of the hinge
  - Lug (knob), handles are a kind of flattened knob attached to the side of pottery
  - Locking lug, a protrusion on a firearm's bolt head that help securing it into the receiver or barrel
  - Lug, a protrusion from the case of a wristwatch to which the strap or bracelet attaches, usually by means of spring bars that bridge pairs of lugs at the upper and lower sides of a watch's case
  - Bayonet lug, a metal mount for a long gun that either locks a bayonet onto the weapon or provides a base for the bayonet to rest against
- Lug, part of a drum used in conjunction with tension rods and counter hoops to tension the drum head in relation to the shell
- Lug nut, a fastener, specifically a nut, used to secure a wheel on a vehicle

== Businesses ==
- Last Unicorn Games, a defunct game publisher
- Level Up! Games, a Philippine video game studio

== Organizations ==
- LEGO users group, a hobbyist organization group focusing on Lego construction toys
- Linux user group, a hobbyist organization providing support for Linux users

== Transportation ==
- Lug (bicycle part), steel tubing and sockets of a bicycle
- Lug or grouser, the portion of the tread design in a tire that contacts the road surface
- Lug sail, a four sided sail bent to a yard
- Lugano Airport, IATA Airport Code LUG, a regional airport located west of the Swiss city of Lugano
- Lugging, damage-prone mode of operation in internal combustion engines

== Other uses ==
- Lug (unit), a unit of measure for linear distance equal to a rod or 1/320 of a statute mile
- Lug, or Lugus, Celtic god in ancient European culture, and many place names
- Lug or Lugh, an ancient god in Irish mythology
- Law of universal gravitation, Isaac Newton's equations for gravity
- Lesbian until graduation, slang term
