= Luts =

Luts may refer to:

== People ==
- Aksella Luts (1905–2005), Estonian filmmaker and actress
- Eduard Luts (1899–1942), Estonian politician
- Karin Luts (1904–1993), Estonian painter and printmaker
- Karl Luts (1883–1942), Estonian oil shale chemist and politician
- Meta Luts (1905–1958), Estonian actress
- Oskar Luts (1887–1953), Estonian writer and playwright
- Peter Luts (born 1971), Belgian-Irish DJ
- Siim Luts (born 1989), Estonian footballer
- Theodor Luts (1896–1980), Estonian film director and cinematographer

== Other uses ==
- Lower urinary tract symptoms (LUTS)
- Lookup table, in film colour grading

== See also ==
- Lut (disambiguation)
