= LRP =

LRP can refer to:

- Lateralized readiness potential, an electrophysiological brain response
- Layerwise Relevance Propagation, a method for understanding how artificial neural networks work
- Lead replacement petrol
- League for the Revolutionary Party
- Liberia Restoration Party
- The Linux Router Project
- Lipoprotein receptor-related proteins
- Lithuanian Regions Party
- Live action role-playing game
- Living free-radical polymerization
- Livestock risk protection, a type of crop insurance for livestock growers
- Long Range Patrol (disambiguation), military units that operate behind enemy lines
  - LRP ration, a lightweight military food ration
- Lower riser package, for well intervention on a subsea oil well
- Long-range plan, business forecast
- Lo Rat Penat
