= LER =

LER or Ler may refer to:

== People ==
- Larry LaLonde, nicknamed "Ler", guitarist of the rock band Primus
- Anthony Ler, Singaporean notorious murderer

== Places and infrastructure ==
- Ler, Norway, a village in the municipality of Melhus in Trøndelag county, Norway
- Ler, South Sudan, a village in the north central part of South Sudan
- Leytonstone High Road railway station, a station in London, England
- Leinster Airport, IATA airport code "LER"
- London Electric Railway, later part of the London Underground

== Science and technology ==
- Label edge router, a term used to define an edge-most router in an IP/MPLS network
- Light-emitting resistor, the working principle of an incandescent light bulb
- Liquid epoxy resin, a precursor to coatings and flooring material
- Locus of enterocyte effacement-encoded regulator, a regulatory protein in pathogenic bacteria
- Luminous efficacy of radiation, for light sources, the ratio of luminous flux to power
- Lunar Electric Rover, a vehicle designed by NASA for extra-vehicular activity on the lunar surface.
- Land equivalent ratio, in multicropping or intercropping agriculture, the relative land area needed for the same yield under equivalent disjoint monocultures

== Other ==
- "Ler" books, a trilogy by M. A. Foster
- Loss Exchange Ratio, a military calculation of comparative casualties of war
- The Loyal Edmonton Regiment, an infantry unit of the Army Reserve Canadian Forces
- Elite One Championship (French: Ligue Élite de Rugby), a French rugby league
- Ler (mythology), a sea god in Irish mythology also known as Lir
