= LCE =

LCE may refer to

- Choriolysin L, an enzyme, also known as low choriolytic enzyme
- LCE, IATA Airport code for Golosón International Airport
- LCE (automobile), an American motor car manufactured in the 1910s
- Life cycle engineering, a methodology for assessing environmental impact
- Little Caesar Enterprises Inc., an American pizza chain
- Logistics combat element, responsible for providing logistical support for United States Marine Corps MAGTFs
- London Commodity Exchange, which merged into London International Financial Futures and Options Exchange
- Low-carbon economy, an economy which has a minimal output of carbon dioxide emissions into the biosphere
