= Plant lifecycle management =

Plant lifecycle management (PLM) is the process of managing an industrial facility's data and information throughout its lifetime. Plant lifecycle management differs from product lifecycle management by its primary focus on the integration of logical, physical and technical plant data in a combined plant model.

A PLM model can be used through a plants whole lifecycle, covering:

- Design,
- Construction,
- Erection,
- Commissioning,
- Handover,
- Operation,
- Maintenance/Refurbishment/Life Extension,
- Decommissioning,
- Land rehabilitation.

== Parts of the model ==
=== Logical model ===
The logical plant model may cover:

- Process & instrumentation diagrams (P&ID)
- Pipe & instrumentation diagrams (P&ID)
- P&I schematic
- Process flow
- Massflow diagram (similar to the process flow but used in the mineral industry)
- Electrical key diagram
- Cabling diagram
- Electrical
- Hydraulic
- Pneumatic
- Heating venting & air-conditioning (HVAC)
- Water and wastewater

=== Physical model ===
Physical parts of a plant are usually represented by 3D CAD models. The CAD system used would typically focus on top-down, routing, and DMU and would differ on many point from the systems used in the mechanical industry, or for Architectural engineering. Sometimes the CAD system would be supplemented by software to generate 3D views or walk-through features.

=== Technical model ===
The technical data is typically managed by an ERP system or some other database. There could also be links to systems for handling unstructured data, like EDM systems.

=== Integration ===
- Integration with Enterprise (EPCM, ePCM),
- Integration with Enterprise (Owner/Operator),
- Integration with Regulator.

=== Applicability ===
- New Build
- Return to Service (RTS)

== See also ==
- Lifecycle management
- ISO 10303 - Industrial automation systems and integration—Product data representation and exchange
- ISO 15926 - Process Plants including Oil and Gas facilities life-cycle data
