= LRC =

LRC may refer to:

== Organizations ==
=== Academic ===
- La Roche College, a Catholic college in Pennsylvania
- Lenoir–Rhyne College, now Lenoir–Rhyne University in North Carolina
- Learning Resource Centre (or Library Resource Centre), a British term for a school library which also provides access to on-line resources
- Livingston Robotics Club, a robotics club in Livingston, New Jersey, US
- Lugar Research Center, a Tbilisi biological institute

=== Business ===
- Leicester Regeneration Company, a former Urban Regeneration Company in Leicester, UK
- London Rubber Company, a British company which distributed imported condoms, later part of SSL International, which is now part of Reckitt Benckiser
- London Rail Concession, the franchising of railway services in London

=== Miscellaneous ===
- Learning Resource Center, a Flowserve training site
- Labour Representation Committee (1900), the historical predecessor of the British Labour Party
- Labour Representation Committee (2004), a modern pressure group within the British Labour Party
- Manitoba Labour Representation Committee (1912–1915), a former Canadian political group
- Lebanese Red Cross, a Lebanese humanitarian and non-profit organization
- Legal Resources Centre, a South African public-interest law organisation
- London Reception Centre, an MI5 processing location for aliens during World War II
- Law Revision Counsel, a U.S. Congressional office overseeing publication of the U.S. Code
- Logistics Readiness Center, a military project of the U.S. Joint Chiefs of Staff
- Linguistics Research Center at UT Austin, a research group at the University of Texas
- London Rowing Club, a British sports club

== Media ==
- LetsRun.com, a running news website and forum
- Left, Right & Center, a political public radio program
- LewRockwell.com, a libertarian news and commentary website
- Literary Review of Canada, a Canadian magazine of book reviews, essays and poetry
- Law Reports of the Commonwealth, a serial on Commonwealth court cases

== Science and technology ==
- Left-right confusion, the inability to accurately differentiate between left and right
- Leukocyte Receptor Complex, the gene cluster containing Leukocyte immunoglobulin-like receptors
- Longitudinal redundancy check, an error detection number calculated over a serial data stream
- Long Range Certificate, an internationally recognized certificate that entitles the holder to participate in marine and mobile radio telephony on leisure crafts
- LRC circuit, an inductance-resistance-capacitance circuit
- LRC (file format), a lyrics file format with time tags

== Transport ==
- LRC, IATA code for Leicester Airport, near Leicester, UK
- Lorong Chuan MRT station, MRT station in Serangoon, Singapore, abbreviated to LRC
- Light, Rapid, Comfortable (French: Léger, Rapide, et Confortable), a Bombardier passenger train used by Via Rail Canada
- Humber LRC (Light Reconnaissance Car), a British recon vehicle from WW2
- Long range cruise, in aviation; for example see Bell UH-1Y Venom

== Other uses ==
- Northern Luri language, the ISO 639-3 language code (lrc)
- Leadership reaction course, for example at Joint Base Cape Cod
