= LCM =

LCM may refer to:

== Computing and mathematics ==
- Latent class model, a concept in statistics
- Least common multiple, a function of two integers
- Living Computer Museum
- Life cycle management, management of software applications in virtual machines or in containers
- Logical Computing Machine, another name for a Turing machine

== Schools ==
- Leeds College of Music, a music conservatoire in Leeds, England
- London College of Music, a music conservatoire in London, England

== Transportation ==
- Landing craft mechanized, a U.S. Navy hull classification symbol
- Laboratory Cabin Module, on the Chinese space station

== Other uses ==
- Land change modeling, an analytical field of geography
- Large-capacity magazine, a type of ammunition storage and feeding device for a repeating firearm
- Laser capture microdissection, use of a laser through a microscope to isolate and extract cells
- League of Communists of Montenegro, the ruling party of the Socialist Republic of Montenegro
- Letalski center Maribor, a Slovenian flying club
- Liquid-crystal module, a liquid-crystal display module
- Liverpool Classical Monthly, an academic journal on classical antiquity
- London Canal Museum, a canal museum in London, England
- London City Mission, in Hoxton, east London, England
- Lower of cost or market, a value
- Lymphocytic choriomeningitis, a viral infection carried by rodents

== See also ==
- Lifecycle management
