= LMB =

LMB is the abbreviation of:

- Largemouth bass (Micropterus salmoides)
- La Martiniere College for Boys, Kolkata
- Laboratory of Molecular Biology, a research institute in Cambridge, England
- Lakshmi Misthan Bhandar Hotel, Indian hotel
- Latvian Mathematical Society (Latvian: Latvijas Matemātikas Biedrība)
- Left Mouse Button on a computer mouse
- Leptomycin B, an inhibitor of protein export from the cell nucleus
- Liga Mexicana de Beisbol, baseball league in Mexico
- Liga Moçambicana de Basquetebol, basketball league in Mozambique
- Merei-Tiale language, Oceanic language with ISO code lmb
- Line Mode Browser, the first multi-platform web browser
- Leon Milton Birkhead (1885–1954), American Unitarian minister and anti-fascist propagandist
- Lois McMaster Bujold (born 1949), American speculative fiction author
