= Lod (disambiguation) =

Lod is a city in Israel.

Lod, LOD and LoD may also refer to:

- Legal Operations Detachment; see United States Army Reserve Legal Command
- Legion of Doom (disambiguation), multiple uses
- Length of day
- Letter of demand (of payment), an instrument in debt collection
- Line of dance in Ballroom
- Line of defense in security
- Last order date, a milestone in Product Life Cycle

== Science and technology ==
- Length on deck, a measurement of a ship over the deck from forward deck to the transom
- LOD, the length of a mean solar day in a uniform time scale such as International Atomic Time; see ΔT
- Limit of detection
- LOD score, logarithm of odds
- Loss on drying
- Lo-D, Hitachi's high-end audio brand in Japan during the 1970s-80s

=== Computing ===
- Law of Demeter, a design guideline for developing software
- Level of detail, a computer graphics technique to adapt the detail of the displayed 3D object to the user needs
- Linked open data, using web technologies to link open data
- Leading-one detector, a logic circuit used in computer arithmetic

== Places ==
- River Lod, a river in West Sussex, England
- Lod airport, a former name of Ben Gurion Airport, Israel
- Lodi, Lombardy
- Province of Lodi, in Italy
- Lod (crater), a crater in the Oxia Palus quadrangle of Mars

== Entertainment ==
- Legacy of Darkness (disambiguation), multiple uses
- The Legend of Dragoon, a PlayStation role-playing game
- Line of Duty, British police procedural television series
- Diablo II: Lord of Destruction, an official expansion to the computer game Diablo II
- L.O.D. (EP), an EP by the American rapper Desiigner
- Lawrence O'Donnell, American television anchor

== See also ==
- Ice (Dukaj novel) (original title: Lód), a 2007 novel by Jacek Dukaj
