= LN =

LN, Ln or ln may refer to:

== Arts and entertainment ==
- Lawful Neutral, an alignment in Dungeons & Dragons
- The Sims 3: Late Night, the third expansion pack to The Sims 3
- Light novel, a style of Japanese novel for young adults
- LN (band), American slow core band
- L-n, a pseudonym of Yiddish writer Mordecai Spector

== Government, military and politics ==
- League of Nations, intergovernmental organisation (1920–1946)
- Legalman, a United States Navy occupational rating
- Lega Nord, a northern Italian populist political party
- Livable Netherlands, a defunct Dutch political party
- Lost Nomination (LN), as of losing a nomination

== Math, science and technology ==
- Natural logarithm (ln), or logarithm base e, a mathematical function
- ln (Unix), a UNIX command that creates file links
- IBM Lotus Notes, the client of a collaborative client-server platform from IBM
- Lanthanide (of which 'Ln' is an informal name) or lanthanoid, a series of chemical elements
- Late Neolithic, an archaeological period
- Liquid nitrogen, the liquefied form of the gas
- Lymph node, an anatomical feature involved in immunological function
- Lightning Network, the decentralized network of Bitcoin to support instant payments

== Places ==
- Lane (Ln), as part of the proper name for a country lane
- Liaoning, a province of China (Guobiao abbreviation LN)
- LN postcode area, in Britain, named after Lincoln
- Norway (aircraft registration prefix LN)

== Other uses ==
- Libyan Airlines, by IATA code
- Louisville and Nashville Railroad, by reporting mark
- Lingala language, by ISO 639 code ln
- Lingnan University, abbreviate as LN
- Norway (aircraft registration prefix LN)
