= Lub =

Lub or LUB may refer to:

- Supremum, least upper bound
- Lub, Oman
- Liga Uruguaya de Basketball (LUB)
- Liub (also known as Lub), a 9th-century ruler of Veleti tribe
- Lumid Pau Airport (IATA: LUB), an airport serving the village of Lumid Pau, Upper Takutu-Upper Essequibo Region, Guyana
- Wilhelmina (Willy) Anna Lub (1900–1986), Dutch physicist who worked with Marie Curie in her Paris laboratory, researching the spectrum of actinium.
