= LTZ =

LTZ or ltz may refer to:

- a high-end trim of Chevrolet vehicles.
- Luxembourgish language ISO 639 code
- Less than Zero (disambiguation), various topics
