= LRRR =

LRRR may refer to:

- Laser Ranging Retroreflector, for Lunar laser ranging
- Lrrr, a character in the TV series Futurama
- Land Rover Range Rover, a series of SUV models produced by Land Rover

== See also ==
- LRR (disambiguation)
