= LFO =

LFO may refer to:

- Low-frequency oscillation, typically below 20 Hz

== Arts, entertainment and media ==
- LFO (British band), short for Low Frequency Oscillation
  - "LFO", a song on the album Frequencies
- LFO (American band), short for Lyte Funkie Ones
  - LFO (album)
- LFO (film), 2013 Scandinavian sci-fi
- Little Fighter Online, a Windows game

== Other uses ==
- London Festival Orchestra
- Lakeview – Fort Oglethorpe High School, Georgia, United States
- LFO scandal, a political scandal in Poland
- Legal Framework Order, 1970, Pakistan, a decree concerning elections
- Looking for offers
