= LQ =

LQ may refer to:

== Businesses and organizations ==
- Lahore Qalandars, a cricket team franchise in the Pakistan Super League
- La Quinta Inns & Suites, a North American hotel chain (operated by LQ Corporation)
- Laser Quest, an indoor lasertag game company
- Latin Quarter (nightclub), New York City, US
- Lebanese Air Transport (IATA airline code: LQ)
- Lanmei Airlines (IATA airline code: LQ)
- No. 629 Squadron RAF (squadron code: LQ)
- London and Quadrant (L&Q), a housing association in England, UK

== Places ==
- La Quinta, California, American resort city
- Latin Quarter (nightclub), New York City, US
- Latin Quarter (disambiguation)
- Lunar quadrangles, see List of quadrangles on the Moon
- Palmyra Atoll (FIPS PUB 10-4 territory code)

== Other uses ==
- Last quarter, a phase of the Moon
- Letter-quality printer, a form of computer printer
- Lexus LQ, luxury XUV car
- Linear–quadratic regulator, a type of controller
- LinuxQuestions.org, a self-help website
- Location quotient, a concept in economic base analysis
- Lutheran Quarterly, academic journal

== See also ==
- Latin Quarter (disambiguation)
