= LBW =

LBW or lbw may refer to:

- Laser beam welding
- Leg before wicket, a way in which a batter can be dismissed in cricket
- Linux Bier Wanderung or Linux Beer Hike, a yearly event
- Low birth weight of a child, defined as less than 2,500 grams
- London Borough of Wandsworth, UK
- Lutheran Book of Worship, Evangelical Lutheran Church, America
- Landing Barge, Water, a type of World War 2 ship
- LBW: Life Before Wedding, a 2011 Indian film
- The Legend of Zelda: A Link Between Worlds, a Nintendo 3DS game
- LBW: Love Beyond Wicket, 2026 Tamil film
