= LDC =

LDC may refer to:

== Businesses ==
- Lambert Dodard Chancereul, a European poultry meat producer
- Legoland Discovery Centre, a British entertainment chain
- Lloyds Development Capital, a London private equity house
- Louis Dreyfus Company, a global merchant firm

== Education ==
- Lady Doak College, Madurai, India
- Law Development Centre, Kampala, Uganda
- Lincoln Developmental Center, Illinois, US

== Government and politics ==
- Landlocked developing country
- Least developed country
- Less developed country
- Leaders' Debates Commission, Canada
- London Dumping Convention, a 1972 treaty
- Louisiana Department of Corrections, United States

== Science and technology ==
- Linguistic Data Consortium, a compiler of corpora and lexica
- Local distribution company, an electric utility
- Locally decodable code, in telecommunication
- Load duration curve, in electric power generation
- Lysine decarboxylase, in biochemistry
- LLVM D Compiler, in computing

== Other uses ==
- Leonardo DiCaprio (born 1974), American actor
- Lidcombe railway station, Sydney, Australia (by station code)
