= LKR =

LKR may refer to:

- Sri Lankan rupee by ISO 4217 currency code
- Liberal-Konservative Reformer (LKR), a former name for Wir Bürger, a German political party
- Little Kids Rock (LKR), an American charitable organization
- Las Khorey Airport, Somalia IATA airport code
- LKR, vehicle registration code for Kraśnik County, Poland
- LKR, ICAO airline designator for Laker Airways
- LKR, station code for Lakhisarai Junction railway station in Bihar, India
- LKR, FAA LID code for Lancaster County Airport, South Carolina, United States
- lkr, ISO 639 code for the Päri language of South Sudan
