= LPC =

LPC may refer to:

== Science and technology ==
- Linear predictive coding, a method used in audio signal processing and speech processing
- Leaf protein concentrate, a concentrated form of the proteins found in the leaves of plants
- Long period comet, a comet classification
- Lysophosphatidylcholine, chemical compounds
- Late positive component, a brain potential
- Liquor picis carbonis (Latin for coal tar solution)

=== Computing ===
- LPC (programming language), the programming language of LPMuds
- Local Procedure Call, in Microsoft's Windows NT operating systems
- Low Pin Count, a computer bus technology
- Lync Persistent Chat, a Microsoft Lync feature
- NXP LPC, a family of 32-bit microcontroller integrated circuits

== Organizations ==
- Lahore Press Club, a press association in Pakistan
- Lambda Pi Chi, a U.S. sorority
- Las Piñas College, Philippines
- Liberal Party of Canada, a Canadian political party
- Li Po Chun United World College, a Hong Kong college
- Little People of Canada, for people of small stature
- London Philharmonic Choir, a British choir
- Lucky People Center, a Swedish electronic music collective
- Luethi-Peterson Camps, an international summer camp program
- New York City Landmarks Preservation Commission, the agency administering the city's Landmarks Preservation Law
- Las Positas College, a community college in California

== Other uses ==
- Lompoc Airport (FAA LID), US
- Legal Practice Course, the vocational stage for becoming a solicitor in England and Wales
- Liable to become a Public Charge (LPC), in US immigration
- Longmont Potion Castle, surrealist prank call artist
- Licensed professional counselor, a professional credential
