= LSO (company) =

Regional shipping carrier

LSO Inc.

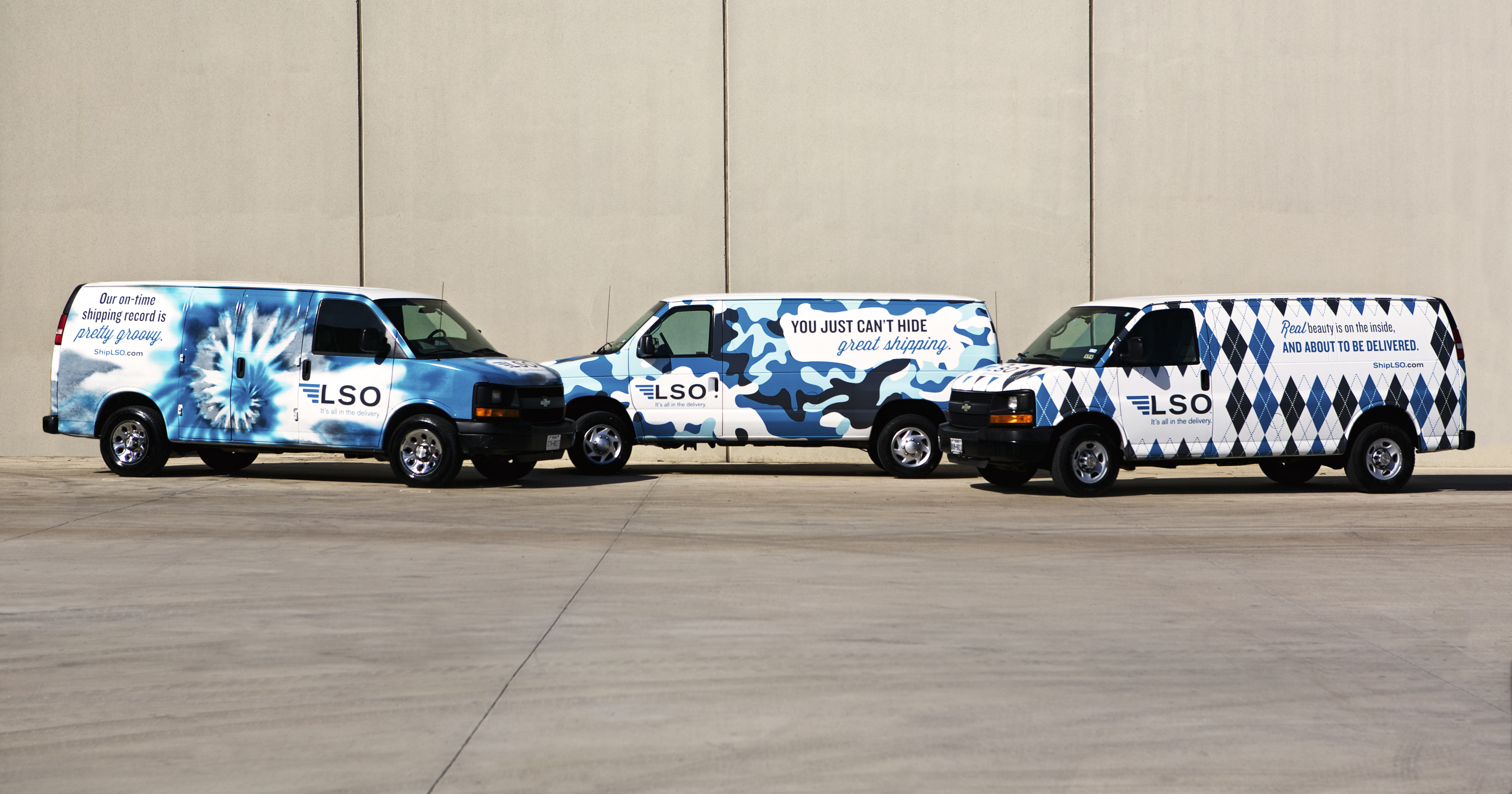
- LSO delivery vans in 2014
- Formerly: Lone Star Overnight (1991–2013)
- Company type: Subsidiary
- Industry: Courier
- Founded: 1991; 35 years ago in Austin, Texas
- Founders: Jack Long; Gary Gunter
- Headquarters: Austin, Texas, United States
- Area served: South and Southwestern United States
- Key people: Sean O'Connor (President & COO)
- Services: Regional parcel carrier; International parcel shipping; LTL Freight; Logistics services
- Parent: WeDo Logistics
- Divisions: LSO Parcel; LSO Global; LSO Final Mile (2015-2020)
- Website: LSO.com

LSO, originally known as Lone Star Overnight, is an Austin, Texas-based regional shipping carrier that focuses on Express next day delivery, utilizing both air and ground transportation in Texas, southeastern New Mexico, certain metro markets in Oklahoma, Louisiana, Arkansas, Alabama and Tennessee, as well as northern Mexico.

== History ==
In November 1990, Jack Long and Gary Gunter began forming Lone Star Overnight in Austin, Texas. With 28 employees and seven packages, Lone Star Overnight began operations on March 4, 1991. The team experienced success and the company broke even within two years.

In 2002, Lone Star Overnight expanded outside of Texas for the first time opening offices in Oklahoma City, Lawton, and Tulsa, Oklahoma.

== Acquisitions ==
The company made major brand changes on May 15, 2013 changing the company name to LSO (an acronym they'd long used informally) and introducing a new logo. In the same year, LSO announced a partnership with Postmaster, an Austin-based shipping and tracking software startup.

In May 2014, LSO was acquired by affiliates of the private equity firm Eagle Merchant Partners. The reported investment in LSO was $20 million in equity plus in-kind and debt financing services.

LSO expanded further in 2015 when it acquired Express Courier International which was renamed LSO Final Mile. The acquisition extended LSO's reach to 7 states across the southeast and southwest. The company continued expansion by opening operations Louisiana in May 2015 and a year later announced their official expansion into major markets in Tennessee, Alabama, and Arkansas.

LSO Global, an international shipping service, was launched in 2019. The service is a partnership with DHL Express reseller DHL OptimalShip and allows LSO shippers to book DHL Express shipments via LSO instead of having to book them separately.

In November 2020, LSO was acquired by WeDo Logistics, a holding company based in Austin, Texas which also owns final-mile parcel delivery provider Scoobeez. WeDo is owned by Ocelot Capital Management which had invested in both LSO and Scoobeez earlier in the year. Following LSO's acquisition, LSO Final Mile returned to the Express Courier International name.

Further expansion followed when LSO announced in June 2021 they would be expanding service in Louisiana, Arkansas, Missouri, Illinois, and Kansas and expected overall ecommerce business growth of 180% - 190%. LSO leadership said the expansion was in response to ecommerce retailers requesting expansion of LSO services after having been dissatisfied with the performance of competitors UPS and FedEx in the 2020 peak shipping season.

== See also ==
- Courier
- Volumetric weight
- Logistics
- Express delivery
- Freight company
