= LRF =

LRF may refer to:

- LRF, the FAA and IATA codes for Little Rock Air Force Base
- LRF, a filetype variant of the Broad Band eBook format.
- Laser rangefinder, a distance sensor used in robotics
- Lambrakis Research Foundation, a Greek non-profit foundation whose activity is mainly focused on education, lifelong learning and culture
- Laogai Research Foundation, a research and advocacy organization founded by Chinese human rights activist Harry Wu
- Local Resilience Forum, a type of UK government civil contingencies organization
- Location Retrieval Function, a functional entity in the LTE network
- Land Rover Freelander
- Light Rock Fishing, a style of angling pioneered in Japan
- Little Rubber Feet, IT industry acronym, the small pieces of rubber found on the bottom of IT equipment
- Federation of Swedish Farmers -- in Swedish, Lantbrukarnas Riksförbund
