= Lug (Bajina Bašta) =

Lug Луг
- Town (Naselje)
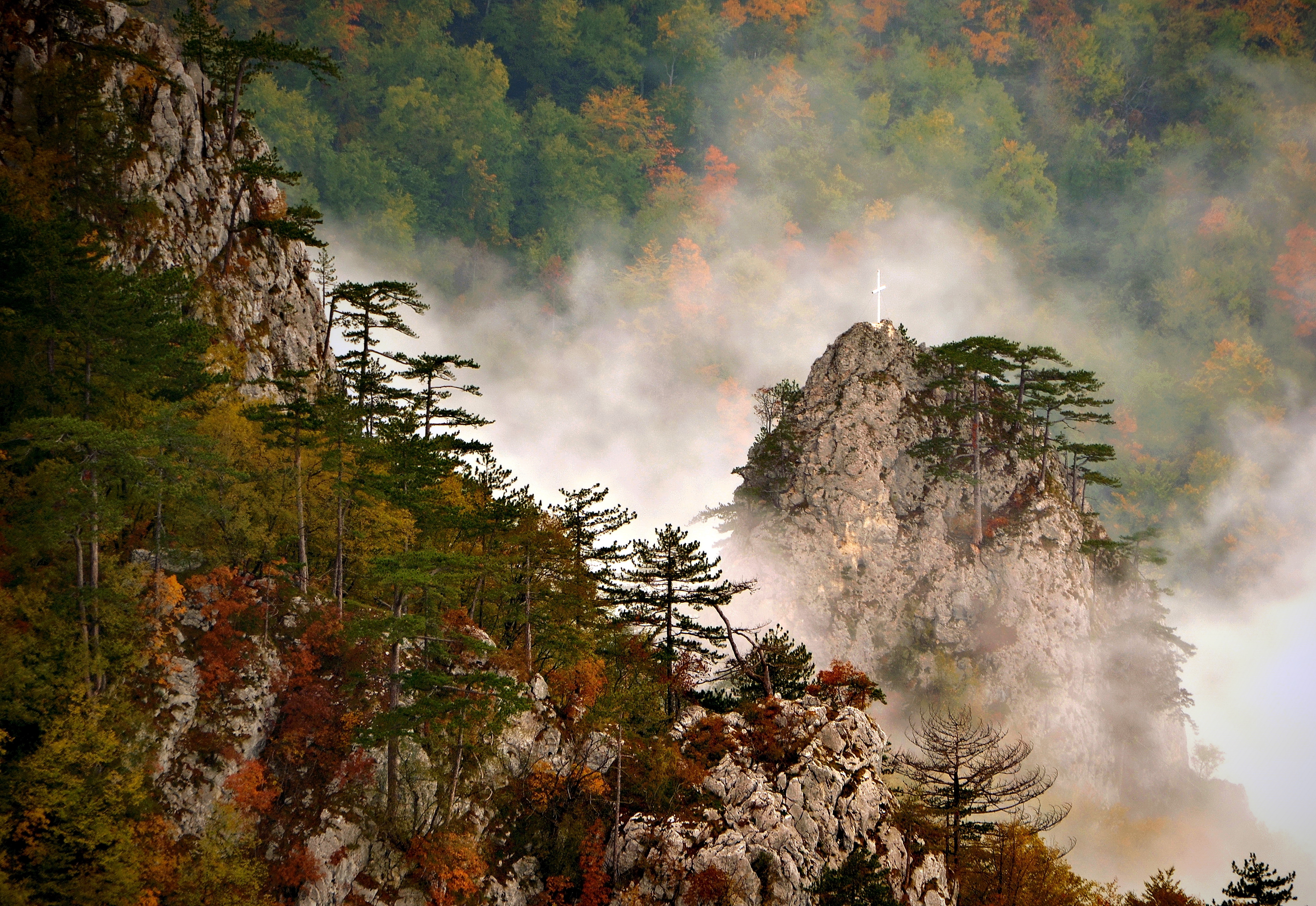
- Canyon of Rača River, near Lug

- Location within Serbia
- Coordinates: 43°58′N 19°33′E
- Country: Serbia
- District: Zlatibor District
- Municipality: Bajina Bašta

Area
  - Total: 3.70 km^{2} (1.43 sq mi)

Population (2011)
  - Total: 2,789
  - Density: 754/km^{2} (1,950/sq mi)
- Time zone: UTC+1 (CET)
  - Summer (DST): UTC+2 (CEST)

Lug (Serbian Cyrillic: Луг) is a Town in the municipality of Bajina Bašta, Serbia. According to the 2011 census, the village has a population of 2,789 inhabitants.
