= LMN =

LMN may refer to:

- Langsomt Mot Nord, a musical group
- Lippo Mall Nusantara, a shopping mall in Jakarta, Indonesia
- LMN (TV channel)
- Lower motor neuron
- LMN Architects
- Legal Marijuana Now Party, a political third party in the United States
