= Labeled magnitude scale =

The labeled magnitude scale (LMS) is a scaling technique which uses quasi-logarithmic spacing. The scale consists of different intensities and subjects are asked to put a mark on the line where they think they intensity of the sensation fits.
