= LTM =

LTM may refer to:

- LTM Limited, a global technology services and consulting company and the business creativity partner
- LTM, IATA code for Lethem Airport, Guyana
- LTM Recordings, British record label
- Long-term memory, memory that can be stored as little as a few days or as long as decades
- Leica thread-mount, an M39 screw lens mount introduced by Leitz Camera in the 1930s
- Last Twelve Months, a financial term also known as trailing twelve months
- Local Traffic Manager, a web networking term synonymous with the term "load balancer"
- Logical Technology Model, term used in solution architecture to describe high-level hardware infrastructure
- Lake of Two Mountains High School
- Limited Time Mode in video games like Fortnite Battle Royale or Rocket League
- London Transport Museum, Transport Museum in London, United Kingdom
- ltm (gene), several lolitrem biosynthesis genes
