= LWS =

The initials LWS may refer to:

- Lethal white syndrome, a genetic disorder of horses
- Lewiston-Nez Perce County Airport, Idaho, US
- LWS (aircraft manufacturer), Poland, 1936-1939
- Living With a Star
- Lewes railway station, a railway station in Sussex, England
- Let Women Speak
