= LH =

LH or lh may refer to:

== Arts and entertainment ==
- Laurel and Hardy, a comedy double act during the early Classical Hollywood era of American cinema
- "Little Hide", 1998 single by Snow Patrol
- Lovehammers, a Chicago-based band
- Love Hina, a 1998 popular manga (and anime) series by author Ken Akamatsu
- The Lurking Horror, an interactive fiction game released in 1987

== Businesses and organizations ==
- Korea Land and Housing Corporation, a South Korean state-owned housing company
- LabCorp (stock symbol LH), a clinical laboratory company
- Lernout & Hauspie, a former Belgium-based speech and language technology company
- Literary and Historical Society (University College Dublin)
- Lufthansa (IATA airline designator), large European airline

== Places ==
- Le Havre, a French city
- Lincoln Highway, in the US
- Locks Heath, a suburb of Fareham, UK
- County Louth, Ireland (code LH)
- L'Hospitalet de Llobregat, a city in Catalonia whose name is sometimes shortened to L'H

== Science and technology ==
- Linear hashing, a computer science algorithm for a dynamic hash
- LH, a type of single-mode optical fiber
- LH (complexity) (for "logarithmic hierarchy"), a computational complexity class
- LH (DOS command), a DOS command that loads a program into the upper memory area
- Luteinizing hormone, a hormone synthesized and secreted by gonadotropes in the anterior lobe of the pituitary gland
- Windows Longhorn, the original code name during the development of Windows Vista

== Other uses ==
- lh (digraph), in many languages
- Bristol LH, a type of British bus manufactured between 1967 and 1982
- Chrysler LH platform, a type of Chrysler car made from 1993 through 2004
- Late Helladic, a period in the history of ancient Greece, during the Bronze Age
- Leasehold, or tenure, in property law
- Left-handed, or left hand
- Letterhead, a heading at the top of a sheet of letter paper
- Lewis Hamilton (born 1985), British racing driver
