= LFO scandal =

The Laboratory for Fractionation of Plasma scandal (also known as LFO scandal or LFO affair) is a phrase used to describe events connected to the investigation which started in 1995 about an investment to build a Laboratory for Fractionation of Plasma in Mielec, Poland. The laboratory was never built. In 2001 the Public Prosecutor's Office of Tarnobrzeg started a criminal investigation in the case of extortion of money to obtain credit to build the laboratory.

== Investment ==
The investment was supposed to create a facility for fractionation of blood plasma and production of different blood-related medical products. The investment was meant to be lucrative. It appeared also that it would materialize WHO order to become independent in production of blood related products. LFO was chosen as the company which would build such a manufacturing plant. The investment proposal received US$34 million in credit mainly from such banks as Kredyt Bank. In 1998 LFO signed a licensing agreement with Australian company CSL Limited. In 1999 the bank stopped giving credit to the investment and in 2000 CSL withdrew from the project. In 2000 LFO signed a new licensing agreement with Octapharma. In 2001 the bank finally withdrew from credit agreement and the National Public Prosecutor's Office started to investigate the project.

LFO's investors were:

- Zygmunt Niziol (company by the name of Nedepol)
- David Minotte and Robert Lewis
- Wlodzimierz Wapinski
- Bjorn Hedberg

== Main aspects of the LFO scandal ==
Polish media inquired about the following issues, which indicated abuses during construction of the factory:

- Charges against Zygmunt Nizioł for extortion of US$21 million in credit and for larceny of $8 million and €1 million.
- The need to return 61 million zlotys by LFO to the banks, which amount was guaranteed by the Ministry of Finance in 2006, despite the fact that a year earlier the Supreme Chamber of Control of the Republic of Poland established that the credit agreement was not valid, because LFO did not complete all the formalities in front of the bank.
- The pressure of officers linked to Polish president Aleksander Kwaśniewski to continue the LFO project despite lack of merit.
- The disappearance of documents regarding the project at the Ministry of Health.

== Criminal investigation ==
- In July 2006 Aleksander Kwaśniewski was questioned.
- On June 16, 2007 Zygmunt Nizioł, the main investor at LFO, was extradited from the United Kingdom to Poland.
- In June 2008 Halina Wasilewska-Trenkner was charged.
- In April 2009 charges against minister Wiesław Kaczmarek for giving an incorrect opinion for the Ministry of Treasury to act as a LFO guarantor were dismissed as not a determining factor in the Ministry of Treasury decision. Subsequently, the district court of Warsaw repealed the verdict taking into consideration the demand by the Public Prosecutor's Office of Tarnobrzeg to transfer the case to the Supreme Court of Poland.
- In February 2010 a separate lawsuit against Zygmunt Nizioł and Włodzimierz Wapiński was due to start.
