= LRU =

LRU may refer to:

== Organisations ==
- Latvian Russian Union, a political party in Latvia
- Lenoir–Rhyne University, US
- Lithuanian Riflemen's Union, a paramilitary organisation in Lithuania
- London Reform Union, a former campaigning group of the Progressive Party

== Other uses ==
- Lance-roquettes unitaire, a variant of the M270 Multiple Launch Rocket System in service with the French Army
- Las Cruces International Airport (IATA code), US
- Least recently used, a cache replacement algorithm
  - The least recently used page replacement algorithm in virtual memory management
- Liberties and Responsibilities of Universities, a French law voted in 2007
- Line-replaceable unit, a modular component of an airplane or other manufactured device
