= LJJ =

LJJ might be an acronym or abbreviation for:

- LJJ genotype of triploid Ambystoma females, consisting of one A. laterale genome and two A. jeffersonianum genomes; see Mole_salamander#Hybrid_all-female_populations
- Long Josephson junction
- Lords Justice of Appeal (singular, LJ)
