= LRS =

LRS may refer to:

== Science and technology ==
- Lactated Ringer's solution, used for intravenous administration
- Learning Record Store, a data store system
- Linear recursive sequence, a recurrence relation used in mathematics
- Linear reference system, a method of spatial referencing along a line
- Limited Rate Support, a Wi-Fi mode; see IEEE 802.11g-2003

== Organisations ==
- Levi, Ray & Shoup, a business consulting firm
- Lietuvos rusų sąjunga (Lithuanian Russian Union), a political party in Lithuania
- Liverpool Reform Synagogue, a Reform Jewish synagogue in Liverpool, England
- London River Services, a division of Transport for London
- Long-range surveillance, a unit of the United States Army

== Other uses ==
- Ley de Responsabilidad Social en Radio y Televisión, a Venezuelan broadcasting law
- Leros Municipal Airport (IATA code), on an island of Greece
- Location Referencing System, used for state-owned roads in Pennsylvania, US
- LRS (TV station)
