= LTO =

LTO may refer to:

== Organizations ==
- Lambda Tau Omega, an American college sorority
- Land Transportation Office, a government agency in the Philippines

== Science and technology ==
- Light tight oil, a type of crude oil
- Linear Tape-Open, a computer storage magnetic tape format
- Link-time optimization, a technique used by compilers to optimize software
- Lithium titanate (Li_{2}TiO_{3}), a compound containing lithium and titanium
  - Lithium-titanate battery, a type of rechargeable battery using a lithium-titanate anode
- Low-temperature oxide, a form of silicon dioxide used in microfabrication
- Lunar transfer orbit, in orbital mechanics

== Other uses ==
- Legal Tribune Online, an online magazine covering legal issues
- Long-term orientation, in behavioral economics
- Loreto International Airport (IATA code), Mexico
- Limited time only, a type of sales promotion
