= Lotis =

Lotis can refer to:

- Lotis (mythology), a nymph in Greek mythology
- Lotis (beetle), a genus of beetles
- Large Optical Test and Integration Site, at the Lockheed Martin Space Systems Company in Sunnyvale, CA
- Livermore Optical Transient Imaging System, an automated telescope for follow-up of gamma ray bursts
- LOTIS committee, the Liberalisation of Trade in Services Committee, a working group within TheCityUK, United Kingdom
- 429 Lotis, a main belt asteroid

== People with the name ==
- Lotis Key, former Filipino-American professional film and theater actress
- Dennis Lotis (1925–2023), South African-born British singer, actor, and entertainer
