= Laxius Force =

- Genre: Role-playing video game
- Developer: Aldorlea Games
- Publisher: Aldorlea Games
- Creator: Indinera Falls
- First release: Laxius Power; October, 2001
- Latest release: Laxius Force III - The Last Stand; August 29th, 2010

Laxius Force is a role-playing video game trilogy developed by Aldorlea Games on RPG Maker XP. The first game in the series was released in August 2008 and the last one in August 2010. It is the second commercial game to be released with this engine after Aveyond, and the first by Aldorlea Games.

== Overview ==
The game is mostly set in a fantasy world, with some futuristic elements. Its appearance and gameplay are similar to the 16-bit Final Fantasy, Phantasy Star and Dragon Quest games. A saved game can be transferred to the next game, but the games can also be played as stand-alones.

There are seven games so far in the series: the first trilogy, Laxius Power (LP); the second trilogy, Laxius Force (LF); and the prequel of the first trilogy, 3 Stars of Destiny. The third trilogy will be begin in 2014. Right now, it is only known that it will be called Laxius S. (The second part of the name will begin with the letter S, but the exact name has not yet been chosen.) Laxius Force and 3 Stars of Destiny have been released on several gaming portals: Big Fish Games, GameStop, Gamersgate, Amazon, Arcade Town, PlayFirst, and Amaranth Games.

== Laxius Power ==
Laxius Power is a freeware role-playing trilogy. The first game was released in 2001 and the last one in 2004.

All three games in the saga feature the same cast of heroes. Unlike the Laxius Force games, they were developed in RPG Maker 2000, as an English version of RPG Maker XP was yet to be released. With gameplay typical of Japanese role-playing games, long and with a number of quests, it has been hailed as "one of the best freeware" games by Home of the Underdogs.

== Laxius Force - Heroes Never Die ==
The sequel to Laxius Power III follows the path of its predecessors and offers a number of quests and characters.

The game is generally seen as a solid RPG experience reminiscent of the 16-bit console RPGs. Jayisgames said, "Laxius Force does a great job of evoking that mid-90s feeling without bringing back the pitfalls that haunt me to this day (level grinding, cheap enemies, etc.)."

It was released on August 18, 2008.

=== Plot ===
Random Pendragon and his girlfriend Sarah Brandolino leave their life in a remote hut to discover the world is falling apart. The dangerous organization named the Order is threatening to destroy a faraway town called Adretana. Random decides to go there to get in touch with the King of Adretana, Julian Xander. They eventually attack the Order but one of their friends, Sandy Richardson, is abducted. The Order threatens to kill her if Random, Sarah and Luciana refuse to exchange themselves. The party decides to go and try to sneak Sandy away, but the mission fails and Sandy is killed. A second attempt leaves the party with two more dead bodies: Louis de Van Gal and Marion Vencjak. Random decides to give up but an apparition of Yveen pushes him to keep going. He accepts to enter a trial and see if he really is worth of being considered a hero.

=== Reception ===
Laxius Force was generally well received among reviewers, with most citing it as a solid role-playing experience with an interesting story.

- Gamers Daily News gave the game its Bronze award with a rating of 7/10, saying, "Laxius Force is an enthralling title that will have you thumping your keyboard as you continue to be enticed by it's [sic] addictive characteristics and fantastic storyline. It stumbles in some areas but never really falls."
- Cosmogaming said, "this game is worth the time and effort!" and gave it 7.5/10.
- Jayisgames said that the game is "a good looking, lengthy (30 or so hours of gameplay) and delightfully retro role playing game that will please just about any RPG buff out there."
- Casual Gamer Chick noted that "the game turns out to be surprisingly deep, especially with the promise of two sequels on the way."
- RPG Fan gave it 84% and said "Laxius Force is a great RPG at a great price... It's tough to say no to a 35+ hour RPG with as much, if not more, text/dialogue than some RPGs from major developers that only costs $15".
- Laxius Force received a 90 out of 100 review on Just-RPG.

Laxius Force was an entrant at the Independent Games Festival Main Competition in 2009.

== Laxius Force II - The Queen of Adretana ==
Laxius Force II is the direct sequel to Laxius Force, as it continues its events. Random and Sarah return, and are joined by Luciana Vincenti, who was already a main character in the Laxius Power games. The game was released on August 19, 2009.

=== Plot ===
Random and his friends are ready to attack the Order hiding in the Dome of Arvendel and free Adretana from the threat. The mission is a success, but the kingpin of the Order, the Grand Commendanter, wants to revenge and sends deadly creatures to target Adretana with bloody murders. At the same time, and unaware of the secret schemes, Luciana and Julian get married. The party is lured out of town and the attack targets the royal court. King Julian is killed, leaving Luciana a widow. After a time of hurt and self-doubt, Luciana decides to rejoin her friends as a fighter. But the Order is still an invisible threat. Sarah has an idea but it goes to pieces after the legendary shrine of Indinera is destroyed by a comet released by the Order.

=== Reception ===
Laxius Force II had a reception similar to Laxius Force.

RPG Fan rated it 85%, saying, "the bottom line regarding Laxius Force II is that if you were not a fan of Laxius Force or the Laxius mythos in general before now, this game will not change your mind. The series is a bit of an acquired taste."

Just-RPG rated it 90 of out 100 and said, "Laxius Force II is a lovely game that continues the epic story of Random and his friends."

== Laxius Force III - The Last Stand ==
The last game in the series features the meeting of Random with the Grand Commendanter. It was released on August 29, 2010.

=== Plot ===
After further losses in Laxius Force II, the party realizes they can't fight back if they cannot locate their enemy. A group is sent to the Institute of Modern Sciences to try to solve this difficult question. In the meantime, the Grand Commendanter hires a famous mercenary nicknamed Kommender to kill Random once and for all.

The result is two attacks, one with a poisonous creature called Aliener; this creature makes Random extremely sick to the point of death. The other attack is with a robot called Titanic. Titanic attempts but is destroyed by a scientist called Daryll. Therefore, both attempts narrowly fail. The Laxius Force discovers that the Grand Commendanter must be hiding above the clouds.

After a series of events, they finally spot the location of an old airport that may be making the connection between the Deport and the Order's hideout.

In the final parts of the game, the Grand Commendanter's army globally attacks the Deport, as a group of four (Random, Sarah, Luciana, Wendala) enters the airport to target him directly. The player has to create six different parties to defend the Deport but cannot alter the choice for the main party.

=== Reception ===
Laxius Force III had a reception similar to the other two.

RPG Fan rated it 85% and said, "Laxius Force III provides a satisfying conclusion to this epic trilogy, and fans of Aldorlea's grand-daddy series will certainly be hooked for days, weeks, maybe even months.".

== 3 Stars of Destiny ==
This game tells the story of Random and Sarah before the events of Laxius Power. They also meet Luciana and Coryool later in the game.

It was released on February 23, 2009 and was Aldorlea's second game.

=== Plot ===
Ozur, an orcish god, needs energy to still continue living. A vision is made of three youths having the unusual energy of the Gods. These three are Random Pendragon, a reckless and fame-loving swordsman; Sarah Brandolino, a snobby High Elf of Indinera; and Luciana Vincenti, a meek and weak girl but also a highly intelligent, cautious and a powerful spellcaster. What they ignore is that Ozur has somehow made a trap for the three of them so that he can suck their highly unnaturally powerful energy.

=== Reception ===
- 3 Stars of Destiny was given 3.5 out of 5 stars by Gamezebo. Chad Sapieha said, "With dozens of primary missions, side quests, and hidden characters, 3 Stars of Destiny can easily keep a player occupied with original content for 30 or more hours.".
- 3 Stars of Destiny was given a 7 out of 10 by Gamers Daily News, who hailed it as "a rather good game for those who knows the classics and games which became real history, but I hardly doubt that younger generation will prefer it to Fallout 3".
- 3 Stars of Destiny was given an 87 out of 100 by RPG Fan, who mentioned the game as "an enjoyable RPG" but also added, "its enjoyment is definitely proportional to how much the player enjoys old-school".
