= LVA =

LVA is the abbreviation of:

- Lake View Academy, a Seventh-Day Adventist boarding school in Bukidnon, Philippines
- Land-vertebrate age, age of a rock formation determined by biochronology
- Las Vegas Academy of the Arts, a public high school in Las Vegas, Nevada
- Lednice-Valtice Area, World Heritage site in the South Moravian Region, Czech Republic
- Library of Virginia, library of the US state of Virginia
- Liberty Veterans Association, association of former crewmen of USS Liberty
- Licensed Victuallers Association, a local member of the UK's Federation of Licensed Victuallers Associations
- Liga Veneto Autonomo, a regional political party in Veneto, Italy
- Liquidity Valuation Adjustment, one of the X-Value Adjustments in relation to derivative instruments held by banks
- Live variable analysis, a method of calculating the live variables at each point in a computer program
- London Video Arts (1976–1988), a British non-profit organization to support video arts
- Luchtvaartafdeling (aviation department), original name of the Royal Netherlands Air Force
- lva, ISO 639-3 code for the Makuva language
- LVA, ISO 3166-1 alpha-3 country code for Latvia
- LVA, possible abbreviation for the Las Vegas Athletics, a potential future Major League Baseball team
- Lymphatic-venous anastomos
