= LBN =

LBN may refer to:

- Lebanon, ISO 3166-1 alpha-3 code
- Lake Baringo Airport, Kenya
- Lamet language, a Mon–Khmer language of Laos, by ISO 639-3 code
- Letshego Bank Namibia
- Ligand bond number, the effective total number of ligands surrounding a metal center
- London Borough of Newham
- Lynds' Catalogue of Bright Nebulae, an astronomical catalogue
- Luohe West railway station, China Railway telegraph code LBN
