= LBH =

LBH may refer to:

- Late Biblical Hebrew
- LBH (gene)
- London Borough of Hackney
- London Borough of Haringey
- London Borough of Harrow
- London Borough of Havering
- London Borough of Hillingdon
- London Borough of Hounslow
- Lyman–Birge–Hopfield bands, see absorption band
- Palm Beach Water Airport (IATA airport code "LBH")
