= LVL =

LVL may refer to:

- Laminated veneer lumber
- LVL (artist), an industrial/electronic artist from New York
- "LVL" (song), a song by American rapper ASAP Rocky from his 2013 debut album Long. Live. ASAP
- LVL, ISO 4217 currency code for Latvian lats, the former currency of Latvia

== See also ==
- Laval, Quebec, a city in Quebec, Canada
- Level (disambiguation)
