= LAS =

Las or LAS may stand for:

== Places ==
=== Poland ===
- Las, Gliwice County, a village in Silesian Voivodeship, southern Poland
- Las, Lublin Voivodeship, a village in eastern Poland
- Las, Silesian Voivodeship, a village in southern Poland
- Las, Warsaw, a neighbourhood of Wawer in south-east Warsaw
- Łaś, Masovian Voivodeship (east-central Poland)

=== Elsewhere ===
- Las (Greece), an ancient city in Greece
- Las Khorey, a town in Somaliland

== Brands and enterprises ==
- Líneas Aéreas Suramericanas, an airline in Bogotá, Colombia
- Lucasfilm Animation Singapore

== Governments and organizations ==
- League of Arab States, in and around North Africa
- Lithuanian Academy of Sciences
- Liverpool Astronomical Society, United Kingdom
- London Ambulance Service, United Kingdom
- Louisville Astronomical Society, United States

== Schools ==
- Lahore American School, Pakistan
- Leysin American School, a boarding school in Switzerland
- Little Angels' School, Nepal
- Loughborough Amherst School, Loughborough, England

== Science and technology ==
- LAS file format, designed for the interchange and archiving of lidar point cloud data
- Linear alkylbenzene sulfonate, a common class of surfactants
- Log ASCII Standard, computer file format in the petroleum industry
- Lung allocation score, US, for prioritising lung transplants
- Launch abort system

== Transport ==
- Harry Reid International Airport, serving Las Vegas, Nevada, US (IATA code LAS)
- Llansamlet railway station, Swansea, Wales (National Rail station code LAS)

== Other uses ==
- Las (mythology), the legendary founder of the town of Las (Greece), who was killed by either Achilles or Patroclus
- Los Angeles Sparks, Women's National Basketball Association team from Los Angeles, California
- Louise Aslanian, a prominent figure in the French Resistance with the pseudonym "Las"
- Lås, an archaic Norwegian unit of length
- The La's, English pop band
- Latin American Spanish, an umbrella term for the Spanish language in the Americas
- Latin American studies, an academic and research field
- Lance–Adams syndrome, sequela of hypoxic encephalopathy
