= Lut =

Lut or LUT may refer to:

== Businesses and organisations ==
- LUT University, Finland
- Loughborough University of Technology, now Loughborough University, England
- London United Tramways (1894–1933), UK

== Places ==
- Lut, Iran, a village in Amol County, Mazandaran Province
- Lut, Sari, or Lowlet, a village in Sari County, Mazandaran Province, Iran
- Lut Desert, i.e. the Lut Desert, a desert in southeastern Iran

== Other uses ==
- Lot in Islam, also spelled Lut, a prophet of God in the Quran
- Lut, a tributary of the Danube in Mehedinți County, Romania
- Luț, a tributary of the river Mureș in Transylvania, Romania
- Łut, a Polish unit of measurement
- LÜT, a segment of YouTube channel Vsauce
- Lushootseed language, ISO 639 code lut
- Luton railway station, England, station code LUT
- Lookup table, in computer science
  - 3D lookup table, in image processing
- Lut, program steering in World War II torpedoes of Germany
- Local User Terminal of the international Cospas-Sarsat Programme satellite system

== See also ==
- Luts (disambiguation)
