= LB =

Lb. is the standard abbreviation for the pound unit of mass.

LB, lb or lb. may also refer to:

== Businesses and organizations ==
- L Brands, an American clothing retailer
- Lane Bryant, a plus-size clothing retailer
- Laurier Brantford, a satellite campus of Wilfrid Laurier University in Brantford, Ontario, Canada
- Movement for Unification (Albanian: Lëvizja për Bashkim), a nationalist Albanian political party in Kosovo
- Ljubljanska banka, a bank named after and based in Ljubljana, Slovenia that operated in SFR Yugoslavia
- Lloyd Aéreo Boliviano airline (IATA code)
- LB.ua (Left Bank (online edition), a Ukrainian online newspaper

== Places ==
- Labrador (former postal abbreviation)
- Laurier Brantford, a satellite campus of Wilfrid Laurier University
- Lebanon (ISO 3166-1 alpha-2 country code)
- Lebap, Turkmenistan (vehicle registration suffix LB)
- Long Beach, California
- Los Baños, Laguna, Philippines

== Science and technology ==
=== Mathematics and computing ===
- .lb, the Internet country code top-level domain (ccTLD) for Lebanon
- Lattice Boltzmann methods, a class of computational fluid dynamics (CFD) methods for fluid simulation
- Liberty BASIC, a programming language
- Binary logarithm, lb(n) = log_{2}(n)
- Lower bound, a mathematical concept in order theory

=== Units of measurement ===
- Pound (mass), abbreviation derived from Latin libra
- Pound-force

=== Other uses in science and technology ===
- L-shaped electrical conduit body with the outlet in the Back ("LB")
- Lysogeny broth (also known as Luria or Luria-Bertani broth), a microbial growth medium

== Sport ==
- Left back, a defensive position in Association football
- Linebacker, a position in American and Canadian football
- Leg bye, in cricket, a run scored by the batting team without the batsman hitting the ball

== Other uses ==
- LB (car ferries), one of several ferries on the HH Ferry route between Elsinore, Denmark and Helsingborg, Sweden
- Luxembourgish language (ISO 639 alpha-2 code)
- Letterboxing (filming)
