= LTG =

LTG or ltg may refer to:

- Latgalian language (ISO 639-3 language code)
- Lieutenant general
- Limits to Growth, Club of Rome
- Linda Thomas-Greenfield (born 1952), United States Ambassador to the United Nations
- Lithuanian Railways
- Laughter, Tears and Goosebumps, debut studio album by Nigerian singer Fireboy DML
