= LNB =

LNB may refer to:

== Sport ==
- Liga Nacional de Baloncesto, a professional basketball league in the Dominican Republic
- Liga Nacional de Básquetbol, an Argentine basketball league
- Liga Nacional de Básquetbol, a Paraguayan basketball league
- Ligue nationale de basket, the governing body of men's basketball in France
- Ligue nationale de basket (Switzerland), a Swiss professional basketball league

== Other uses ==
- Laredo National Bank, an American commercial bank
- Level of neutral buoyancy
- Low-noise block downconverter
- Mbalanhu dialect of the Ovambo language
- National Library of Latvia (Latvian: Latvijas Nacionālā bibliotēka)
