= LDW =

LDW may refer to:

- Ladhowal railway station, Ludhiana district, Punjab, India
- Lane departure warning
- Last Day of Work, a video game developer
- Lindenwold (NJT station), Amtrak station code
- Liu Wei Di Huang Wan, a traditional Chinese medical formula
- Loss damage waiver, also called CDW (Collision Damage Waiver)
