= LFG =

LFG may refer to:

- Landfill gas, a waste gas containing methane and other gases emitted by landfills
- Lexical functional grammar, a theory of syntax
- Lagged Fibonacci generator, an example of a pseudorandom number generator
- "Looking for group", a phrase often used in MMORPGs such as World of Warcraft
- Looking for Group, a fantasy-based webcomic
- Luft-Fahrzeug-Gesellschaft, a German aircraft manufacturer of World War I, known primarily for their "Roland" designs
- LandAmerica Financial Group (NYSE: LFG), a Fortune 500 company that provides title insurance and other real estate transaction services
- Lycée Français de Gavà Bon Soleil
- LFG (film), 2021 American documentary film
- WWE LFG, an American professional wrestling reality television series produced by WWE
