= LDV =

LDV may refer to:

== People ==
- Leonardo da Vinci (1452–1519), Italian Renaissance polymath
- Lisa De Vanna (born 1984), Australian soccer player

== Sport ==
- Lansing Derby Vixens, an American roller derby league
- LDV Vans Trophy, the English Football League prize from 2000 to 2007
- Lisa De Vanna (born 1984), Australian soccer player

== Transport ==
- LDV Group, a British van manufacturer (1993–2009)
- Light duty vehicle, a US van classification

== Other uses ==
- Laser Doppler vibrometer
- Lactate dehydrogenase elevating virus
- Local Defence Volunteers, in the UK during WWII
