= LTD =

LTD or Ltd may refer to:

== Business and finance ==
- Private company limited by shares, a class of company in the UK and some Commonwealth nations
- Limited company, a class of company in several countries with limited liability
- Lifetime deal, a customer retention tactic where for a one-time payment a business provides a service or tool indefinitely (i.e. for its lifetime) without recurring charges

== Music ==
- LTD (album), a 1998 album by Buck-Tick
- L.T.D. (band) (for "Love, Togetherness and Devotion"), a 1970s funk music group

== Science and technology ==
- Linear transformer driver, which generates short high-current pulses
- Long-term depression, in physiology, an hours-long reduction in the efficacy of synapses

== Transportation ==
- Ford LTD (Americas), a series of vehicles produced 1965–1986
- Ford LTD (Australia), a series of vehicles produced 1973–2007
- Lane Transit District, a public transportation agency in Oregon, US

== Other uses ==
- LTD, a brand of guitars and basses made by ESP Guitars
- LTD Powersports, a stock car racing team
