= Electrics =

Electrics may mean:

- Electric vehicle which is propelled by one or more electric motors, using energy stored in rechargeable batteries
- Electrical wiring installed in a building
- Electrical network or circuit of any kind

== In music ==
- "Electrics", a song on Listen, A Flock of Seagulls album
