= LBT =

LBT may refer to:

In government and politics:

- Local Body Tax, in India

Places:

- Larbert railway station, Scotland, station code
- Lötschberg Base Tunnel, a railway tunnel under the Swiss Alps
- Lumberton Municipal Airport (IATA Airport code: LBT)

In science and technology:

- Large Binocular Telescope, in Arizona, US
- Taylorcraft LBT, a U.S. WWII glider aircraft

Other uses:

- Long Beach Transit, California, US
- Linuxcare Bootable Toolbox, historical Linux distribution
