= LHD =

LHD can mean:

- Landing helicopter dock, a type of warship.
- Large Helical Device, a major Japanese nuclear fusion reactor.
- Leatherhead railway station, Surrey, England, by National Rail station code
- Left hand drive, a vehicle with the driving controls mounted on the left side of the cabin. Used in most countries where traffic travels on the right-hand side of the road.
- Liechtenstein Homeland Service, a defunct corporatist party in Liechtenstein.
- Limburgse Handbal Dagen, a handball tournament in Limburg.
- Linear heat detection, a type of fire alarm system utilized in tunnels and special hazards.
- Litterarum Humanarum Doctor, Latin for Doctor of Humane Letters, an honorary academic degree for persons with significant accomplishments in fields other than science.
- Load, haul, dump machine, a vehicle used in underground mining.
- Local health department, government agencies in the United States.
- Lake Hood Seaplane Base near Anchorage, Alaska (FAA location code: LHD)
