= Leu =

Leu may refer to:

== Businesses and organisations ==
- LEU, NYSE stock symbol for Centrus Energy Corp.
- London Ecology Unit, a former body (1986–2000) which advised London boroughs on environmental matters
- Free and Equal (LeU – Liberi e Uguali), a political alliance in Italy

== Heraldry ==
- Leu, archaic term for Wolves in heraldry

== Money ==
- Moldovan leu, monetary unit of Moldova
- Romanian leu, monetary unit of Romania

== Places ==
- LEU, IATA code for Andorra–La Seu d'Urgell Airport in Spain
- Leu, Dolj, a commune in Dolj County, Romania

== Science and technology ==
- Low-enriched uranium, uranium that is enriched but to less than 20% U-235
- Leu (or L), abbreviation for leucine, an amino acid
- Lineside Electronics Unit, a component of the European Train Control System

== People with the surname ==
- August Leu (1818–1897), German painter
- Livia Leu Agosti (born 1961), Swiss diplomat
- Mihai Leu (1968–2025), Romanian professional boxer
- Véronique Leu-Govind, Mauritian politician
