= LSE =

LSE may refer to:

== Education ==
- London School of Economics, a public research university within the University of London
- Lahore School of Economics, a private university in Lahore, Punjab, Pakistan
- Lincoln Southeast High School, a public government education school located in Lincoln, Nebraska
- Louvain School of Engineering, faculty of engineering science at the University of Louvain (UCLouvain), Belgium

== Computing ==
- Langage symbolique d'enseignement ("Symbolic teaching language"), a computer programming language
- Language-Sensitive Editor, a text editor used on Digital Equipment Corporation's VMS operating system
- Large system extensions, a set of atomic memory operations such as fetch-and-add for the 64-bit ARM (AArch64) architecture
- Latent sector error, an unrecoverable read error on a hard disk drive which has not yet been discovered

== Finance ==
- Lahore Stock Exchange, now Pakistan Stock Exchange
- London Stock Exchange
- London Stock Exchange Group, the owner group of the London Stock Exchange

== Transport ==
- La Crosse Regional Airport, Wisconsin, United States (IATA code LSE)
- La Crosse station - Amtrak code LSE
- Luzern–Stans–Engelberg railway line, a mountain railway in Switzerland

== Other uses ==
- Load serving entity, an electricity demand aggregator in the deregulated market.
- Landing ship, Emergency Repair, a US WW2 Navy ship
- Least-squares estimation, a statistical technique commonly used in data fitting
- Lengua de signos española, Spanish Sign Language
- Logical Sensory Extrovert, a socionics personality type
- Lysergic acid ethylamide, also known as LAE or LAE-32, an LSD-related psychedelic drug
