= LNR =

LNR may refer to:

== Transportation ==
- Aeronca L-3, a World War II aircraft also known by the designation LNR
- Leeds Northern Railway, a 19th-century British railway company
- Llanwrda railway station, Wales, station code LNR
- London Northwestern Railway, part of British train operating company West Midlands Trains
- Tri-County Regional Airport, Wisconsin, U.S., IATA airport code LNR

== Other ==
- Ellen Henrietta Ranyard (1810–1879), an English writer who wrote as "LNR"
- Lao National Radio, the national radio station for Laos
- Ligue nationale de rugby, operates the top two rugby union leagues in France
- Local nature reserve, a type of nature reserve in the UK
- Lugansk People's Republic (Russia), a de facto federal subject of Russia
- Luhansk People's Republic (Luhanska Narodna Respublika), former self-proclaimed quasi-state in Ukraine (2014-2022)
