= LTL =

LTL may refer to:

- Less than truckload, a freight industry term describing quantity
- Less than lethal, weapons intended to cause bodily injury instead of death
- Linear temporal logic, a field of mathematical logic
- Littleborough railway station, with National Rail station code "LTL"
- Ford LTL, a long haul truck in the Ford L series
- The ISO 4217 currency code for the Lithuanian litas, former currency of Lithuania
- Loyal Temperance Legion, Woman's Christian Temperance Union branch encouraging substance abuse avoidance
