= LNER =

LNER or L.N.E.R. may refer to:

- London and North Eastern Railway (1923–1947), a former railway company in the United Kingdom
- London North Eastern Railway (2018–), a train operating company in the United Kingdom
- Liquid neutral earthing resistor, a type of liquid resistor

== See also ==
- , including articles about LNER locomotives
