= LLGC =

LLGC may refer to:

- London Lesbian and Gay Centre
- Llyfrgell Genedlaethol Cymru – The National Library of Wales
- LLG Cultural Development Centre
- Lim Lian Giok
