= LGM =

LGM may refer to:

- Lady International Correspondence Chess Grand Master
- Lao Gan Ma
- Last Glacial Maximum
- LGM (film) or Let's Get Married, an Indian Tamil-language romantic drama film
- Libre Graphics Meeting
- Little green men, a stereotypical portrayal of extraterrestrials
- Little Green Men Games
- Let's Go Mets, a common chant at New York Mets baseball games

== See also ==
- LGM-1, a pulsar, also referred to as LGM
- LGM-2, a star with anomalous variations in brightness
- LGM-25 Titan I ICBM
- LGM-25C Titan II ICBM
- LGM-30 Minuteman ICBM
- LGM-118 Peacekeeper ICBM
- Little Green Men (disambiguation)
