= Latin Quarter (disambiguation) =

The Latin Quarter (Quartier Latin) is a part of the 5th arrondissement of Paris, France.

Latin Quarter may also refer to:

== Neighbourhoods ==
=== Europe ===
- Latin Quarter, Copenhagen, a neighbourhood in Copenhagen, Denmark
- Latin Quarter, Aarhus, part of Midtbyen, Aarhus C, Denmark

=== Other parts of the World ===
- Quartier Latin, Montreal in Montreal, Canada
- Fontainhas (quarter), the Latin quarter of Panaji, Goa, India
- Latin Quarter, the Little Havana neighborhood of Miami, Florida

== Other ==
- Latin Quarter (band), a British pop/rock band
- Latin Quarter (1929 film), a silent German film
- Latin Quarter (1939 film), a French film
- Latin Quarter (1945 film), a British film
- Latin Quarter, a 2011 American film featuring Dean Cain
- "Latin Quarter", a song by Harry Warren and Al Dubin from the 1938 film Gold Diggers in Paris
- "Latin Quarter", a song by John Zorn from the 1990 album Naked City
- Latin Quarter (nightclub), New York City nightclub
- Quartier Latin International, a soukous band from the Democratic Republic of the Congo
