= Line of sight (disambiguation) =

Line of sight (adjectival form line-of-sight) is the unobstructed line between an observer and a subject of interest.

Line of sight or Line of Sight may also refer to:

- Sightline (architecture), an unobstructed line-of-sight between a subject and object in a construction
- Line of sight (video games), visibility on a gaming field, i.e. who can see what
- Line of Sight (film), a 1960 French drama film
- Line of Sight (novel), a techno-thriller novel
- Line of Sight: Vietnam, a video game
- "Line of Sight", a song by Odesza from A Moment Apart
- Line-of-sight: Leonardo da Vinci's term for the path that light follows to reach the fovea
