= LTI =

LTI can refer to:

- LTI – Lingua Tertii Imperii, a book by Victor Klemperer
- Language Technologies Institute, a division of Carnegie Mellon University
- Linear time-invariant system, an engineering theory that investigates the response of a linear, time-invariant system to an arbitrary input signal
- Licensed to Ill, the 1986 debut album by the Beastie Boys
- Lost Time Incident or industrial injury or Occupational injury
- Learning Tools Interoperability
- Louisiana Training Institute-East Baton Rouge, later known as the Jetson Center for Youth (JCY), a juvenile prison in Louisiana

== Companies ==
- London Taxis International
- Larsen & Toubro Infotech

== Biology and medicine ==
- Lymphoid tissue-inducer cell, see innate lymphoid cells
