= LNO =

LNO may refer to:

- Laona and Northern Railway, Laona, Wisconsin, US
- Leonora Airport (IATA airport code LNO), Western Australia
- Liaison officer, a person that liaises between two organizations to communicate and coordinate their activities
- Linux Native Oberon, a version of the Oberon operating system
- Loop nest optimization, a method for optimising source code
- A member of the Order of the Polar Star (Swedish: Ledamot av Nordstjärneorden)
