= Long Range Patrol =

Long Range Patrol (LRP) may refer to:

- Long-range penetration, a technique for military reconnaissance, but which may also involve interdiction of enemy forces
- Long-range reconnaissance patrol, a military unit which provides the eyes and ears for other forces but ideally has no direct contact with the enemy
- The original name for the Long Range Desert Group, a British World War II unit
- Long Range Patrol (film), a 2013 Finnish film

== See also ==
- LRP ration
