= LW =

LW may refer to:

== Arts and entertainment ==
- Life's Work, a 1990s American situation comedy
- Lethal Weapon, a 1987 film
- Love Wrecked, a 2005 romantic comedy film
- L.W. (album), the seventeenth studio album by King Gizzard & the Lizard Wizard

== Businesses and organizations ==
- Lam Woo, Sheng Kung Hui Lam Woo Memorial Secondary School
- Latham & Watkins, a lawfirm and owner of the Domain LW.com
- Luftwaffe, the German air force
- Lauda Europe (IATA code LW)
- Pacific Wings, a former US American airline (then-IATA code LW)

== Science ==
- Lawrencium, a chemical element with former symbol Lw (now Lr)
- Longwave, a frequency band in radio communications
- Sound power level, Lw

== Software ==
- LightWave, a 3D rendering software package
- LimeWire, a discontinued file sharing program

== Other uses ==
- Left wing, a forward position in ice hockey
- Left winger, a position in association football
- Low water, aka low tide, in nautical use
- Lutheran Worship, a hymnal of The Lutheran Church–Missouri Synod
- LessWrong, an online discussion forum
- Lakeshore West line (LW) of the GO Transit rail network in Ontario, Canada
