= Less than Zero =

Less than Zero may refer to:

== Written works ==
- Less than Zero (novel), a 1985 novel by Bret Easton Ellis

== Television and film ==
- Less than Zero (film), a 1987 film directed by Marek Kanievska based on the novel
- Less than Zero, a 2018 television series adaptation of the novel produced by Hulu

== Songs and albums ==
- "Less than Zero" (Elvis Costello song), a 1977 song by Elvis Costello
- "Less than Zero" (The Weeknd song), a 2022 song by the Weeknd
- Less than Zero (soundtrack), the soundtrack to the 1987 film
- Less than Zero, a 2005 album by LA Symphony

== Other meanings ==
- Any negative number

== See also ==
- Below Zero (disambiguation)
