= LBP =

LBP may refer to:

== Sport ==
- Liga de Baloncesto Puertorriqueña, the tier-two men’s basketball professional league in Puerto Rico.

== Medicine ==
- Lipopolysaccharide binding protein
- Low back pain, a common muscle disorder

== People ==
- Lester B. Pearson, Canadian Prime Minister
- Luhut Binsar Pandjaitan, Indonesian politician, businessman, and retired Army general

== Organisations ==
- Lok Bhalai Party, an Indian religional political party
- Lok Biradari Prakalp, a NGO in Maharashtra, India

== Video games ==
- LittleBigPlanet, a video game series
- LittleBigPlanet (2008 video game)
- LittleBigPlanet (2009 video game)

== Other ==
- Length between perpendiculars, a measure of a ship's length
- Lebanese pound, the currency of Lebanon
- Local binary patterns, a type of visual descriptor
- Long Banga Airport, Malaysia (by IATA code)
