= LKA =

LKA may refer to:

- Gewayantana Airport (IATA: LKA), Indonesia
- Idalaka language of East Timor, ISO 639 code
- Lalit Kala Akademi, India's national academy of fine arts
- Landeskriminalamt (State Criminal Police), police agency of a German state
- Lane-Keeping Assist, a lane departure warning system which keeps vehicles in lane
- Lietuvos krepšinio asociacija, precursor to the Lithuanian Basketball League Lietuvos krepšinio lyga
- Lithuanian Space Association (Lietuvos Kosmoso Asociacija)
- A US Navy hull classification symbol: Amphibious cargo ship (LKA)
- LKA Longhorn, a music venue in Stuttgart, Germany
- Łódź Agglomeration Railway or ŁKA (Łódź Metropolitan Railway), Poland
- Sri Lanka, ISO 3166-1 alpha-3 country code
- Switzerland women's ice hockey league (Leistungsklasse A)
