= LN (band) =

American slowcore band

LN / Gary Murray & LN
- Genres: Slowcore
- Labels: GMLN (2013-Present) / Velvet Blue Music (1998-2008)
- Members: Gary Murray, Dalton Brand, Nathan Abel
- Past members: Casey VanSickle, Denny Kopp, Torey Freeman, and others.
- Website: http://www.garymurray.bandcamp.com

LN is a band from Ohio that has released several albums and EPs on California-based independent record label Velvet Blue Music. LN is primarily the work of artist Gary Murray. In December 2004, American webzine Somewhere Cold ranked the album Dirt Floor Hotel Part 1 No. 6 on their 2004 Somewhere Cold Awards Hall of Fame list.

== Name ==
LN was originally short for Love Neptune. The name was shortened because Velvet Blue Music was already associated with the bands Starflyer 59 and Jupiter James, and it was felt that the addition of Love Neptune to the roster would make it too spacey.

Beginning in 2006, Gary Murray began releasing music under his own name.

== Discography ==
=== Albums ===
- Novel (2001, Velvet Blue Music)
- Dirt Floor Hotel Part 1 (2005, Velvet Blue Music)
- Dirt Floor Hotel Part 2 (2005, Velvet Blue Music)
- Minor Lives (2013, GMLN)
- Monkeys & Spoons (2022, Velvet Blue Music)

=== EPs ===
- Cool September Skies (1996, Velvet Blue Music)
- Plum Brook (1999, Velvet Blue Music)
- Imaginary Cars (2000, Velvet Blue Music)
- Gravity Gun (2005, Velvet Blue Music)
- Drawn by Swans (2005, Velvet Blue Music)
- The Revenant Waltz (2006, Velvet Blue Music) (as Gary Murray)
- Downstream Angels (2008, Velvet Blue Music) (as Gary Murray & LN)
- Morningbird (2023, Velvet Blue Music)

=== 7" ===
- Without Your Song (2005, Velvet Blue Music)
- Friends Who Play Guitar (2006, Clerestory AV) (split 7-inch with Gary Murray and MAP)

=== Collections ===
- So You May Find Me When I'm Lost (2009, Velvet Blue Music)
