= No. 629 Squadron RAF =

No. 629 squadron
- Active: 1999
- Country: United Kingdom
- Branch: Royal Auxiliary Air Force
- Type: non-flying squadron
- Role: Helicopter Support

No. 629 Squadron RAuxAF was a non-flying squadron of the Royal Auxiliary Air Force formed in 1999 for "Helicopter Support".

For the period April to September 1939, "No. 629 (Chiltern) Squadron" of the Auxiliary Air Force was allocated the Squadron Code LQ for use by the squadron, were it to be formed, but this did not happen.
