= LDA =

LDA may refer to:

== Aviation ==
- Localizer type directional aid, a landing procedure
- Landing distance available, a runway length

== Law ==
- Legal document assistant, an independent paralegal role
- Lobbying Disclosure Act of 1995, United States
- Legal drinking age, a minimum age of alcohol consumption

== Music ==
- LDA (singer) (born 2003)
- Little Dark Age, a 2018 MGMT album

== Organizations ==
- Lahore Development Authority, agency in Lahore, Pakistan
- Left Democratic Alliance, left-wing political alliance in Bangladesh
- Liga Deportiva Alajuelense, a Costa Rican football club
- London Democratic Association, 19th century organisation in England
- London Development Agency, regional development agency for the London region in England
- Lord's Day Alliance, an ecumenical Christian first-day Sabbatarian organization

== Science and technology ==
- Laser Doppler anemometry, to measure velocity
- Latent Dirichlet allocation, in natural language processing
- Left-displaced abomasum, a condition of ruminants
- Linear diode array, in X-ray imaging
- Linear discriminant analysis, in statistics
- Lithium diisopropylamide, a chemical base
- Local delivery agent, in e-mail
- Local-density approximation, in quantum mechanics
- Low density amorphous ice, a solid phase of water
- Lobate debris apron, a Martian landform
- Low dose allergens, a variant of enzyme potentiated desensitization
