= LTC =

LTC may refer to:

== Organizations ==
- Lakeshore Technical College, Cleveland, Wisconsin, US
- Latino Theater Company, Los Angeles, California, US
- Licensed Trade Charity, UK
- Linear Technology Corporation, Milpitas, California, US
- Linux Technology Center, in IBM
- London Transit Commission, Ontario, Canada

== Science, technology, and medicine ==
- Linear timecode, encoded in audio signal
- Long-term care, of the chronically ill
- Litecoin, a peer-to-peer digital currency
- Coordinated Lunar Time, lunar standard time

== Other uses ==
- Leave Travel Concession; see LTC Scam
- Light timber construction schools, Australia
- Lieutenant colonel in the US Army
- License To Carry firearms in some US states (concealed carry in the United States)
- Load Tap Changer, for adjusting transformer voltage at substations.
- Losing-Trick Count, for evaluating bridge hands
- Lower Thames Crossing, UK
- ltc, the ISO 639-3 and Linguist List code for Middle Chinese
