= Lisburn Standard =

- Type: Weekly Newspaper
- Format: Broadsheet
- Founded: 1878
- Political alignment: Unionist
- Language: English
- Ceased publication: 1959
- Free online archives: British Newspaper Archive

The Lisburn Standard, referred to simply as The Standard, was a weekly newspaper based in Lisburn, Northern Ireland. It was established in 1878, and served the communities of Lisburn, Lambeg, Dunmurry and the surrounding areas of County Antrim. It was issued every Friday evening. It reported on local events and updates, as well as global news, such as WWI and WWII.

The newspaper dissolved in May 1959. The Lisburn Standard was digitized and added to the British Newspaper Archive in June 2020.
