= LPS =

LPS may refer to:

== Science and medicine ==
- Lipopolysaccharide (Endotoxin)
- Levator palpebrae superioris muscle
- Laboratoire de Physique des Solides (LPS)

== Schools ==
- Leighton Park School in Reading, England
- Lexington Public Schools, a school district in Massachusetts, USA
- Lincoln Public Schools, a school district in Nebraska, USA
- Livonia Public Schools, a school district in Michigan, USA
- Lucknow Public School in Uttar Pradesh, India
- Luther Preparatory School in Wisconsin, USA

== Technology ==
- Leases per second, a speed measure for DHCP servers
- Leica Photogrammetry Suite, software used in building maps
- Lexus Personalized Settings in Lexus cars
- Lightning protection system, a system to protect a structure from damage due to lightning strikes
- Lightweight Portable Security - Linux LiveCD, or LiveUSB that provides a secure end node client
- Linear power supply
- Linux Powered System
- Local positioning system, navigation without GPS
- Low-pressure sodium-vapor lamps

== Miscellaneous ==
- Laajasalon Palloseura, association football club from Helsinki, Finland
- Land and Property Services, an agency of the Northern Ireland Executive
- Lander, Parkin, and Selfridge conjecture, an unproven mathematical statement about equal sums of like powers
- Lanterman–Petris–Short Act
- Large-panel system, the use of prefabricated concrete slabs to construct buildings — see Plattenbau
- Large Polyp Stony corals
- Last Pizza Slice, Slovenian band often called LPS
- Lender Processing Services in Jacksonville, Florida (in 2014 renamed to Black Knight Financial)
- Letting Protection Service Scotland, Tenancy deposit schemes (Scotland)
- Liberal Party of Switzerland
- Limit of Positive Stability for boats
- Liters per second
- Littlest Pet Shop, a toy and cartoon series
- Lostprophets an alternative metal band from Pontypridd, Wales, UK
- Long playing records
- Surf (Amtrak station), Lompoc, California, United States; Amtrak station code LPS.
- Levopimaradiene synthase, an enzyme
- Limited Power Source, a class of electrical power source defined by UL and similar organizations.
