= LVAD =

LVAD may stand for:

- Left ventricular assist device, see Ventricular assist device
- Low-Velocity Airdrop, see HALO/HAHO
