= LBR =

LBR may refer to:

== Places ==
- Liberia, by FIFA, IOC, International Telecommunication Union and ISO 3166-1 country codes
- London Borough of Redbridge, England
- Lady Beaverbrook Residence, a residence house at the University of New Brunswick
- Clarksville/Red River County Airport, Clarksville, Texas; FAA airport code

== Rail ==
- Leighton Buzzard Railway, England
- Llanbedr railway station, UK railway station
- London and Birmingham Railway, an early railway company in the United Kingdom from 1833 to 1846
- Lowville and Beaver River Railroad, a short-line railroad owned by Genesee Valley Transportation (GVT) of Batavia, New York, US
- Lynton and Barnstaple Railway, England, opened as an independent railway in 1898

== Sports ==
- Liga Bolasepak Rakyat, fourth-tier football league in Malaysia

== Science and technology ==
- Lamin B receptor, a protein that in humans is encoded by the LBR gene
- LBR (file format), the file-name extension for a computer file format for archiving files on CP/M and early MS-DOS systems

== Other uses ==
- Legal Bill Review
- Leichtbauroboter (German for Lightweight robot).
- Lenny B. Robinson (Baltimore Batman)
- Lisa Blunt Rochester, American politician and U.S. Senator from Delaware.
