= Load factor =

Load factor may refer to:

- Load factor (aeronautics), the ratio of the lift of an aircraft to its weight
- Load factor (computer science), the ratio of the number of records to the number of addresses within a data structure
- Load factor (electrical), the average power divided by the peak power over a period of time
- Capacity factor, the ratio of actual energy output to the theoretical maximum possible in a power station
- Passenger load factor, the ratio of revenue passenger miles to available seat miles of a particular transportation operation (e.g. a flight)
- Factor loadings in statistics, the exposure to specific factors or components in Factor Analysis or Principal Component Analysis

== See also ==
- Add-on factor - sometimes called load factor
