= LMB Hotel =

Lakshmi Misthan Bhandar Hotel
- Interactive map of the Lakshmi Misthan Bhandar Hotel area
- Former names: LMB Hotel

General information
- Location: Jaipur, Rajasthan, India, Johari Bazar
- Coordinates: 26°55′11″N 75°49′32″E
- Completed: 1954

Other information
- Number of rooms: 33

Lakshmi Misthan Bhandar Hotel, popularly known as just LMB, is a well-known hotel, restaurant and sweet shop in Jaipur city in Rajasthan state in India. Established in 1727, it is located in downtown Jaipur in Johari Bazar. The hotel is said to be the first three star hotel of the state. Today, it is most known for its restaurant and mithai shop (sweet shop), which are a popular tourist attraction, serving traditional sweets like paneer ghewar, and the sweet lassi, apart from snacks, like samosa, chaat and Aloo tikki.

== History ==
In 1727, when by Maharaja Sawai Jai Singh II, the ruler of Amber, founded the new capital city of Jaipur, he invited traders and artists from nearby towns to the newly built city, amongst them were a group of halwais, who set up a small sweet shop in Johri Bazaar. Years later in around, 1949/1950, one of the descendants of these halwais, Maliram Ghodawat, branded this sweet shop, as the Lakshmi Mishthan Bhandar (LMB). The hotel was added later on in 1954. LMB is famous for its restaurant and sweetshop on the street-level, while the hotel stands above them. The restaurant serves pure vegetarian food and is known for its Rajasthani thali, Dal bati churma, and kulfi.

On 13 May 2008, one of nine nearly simultaneous bomb blasts in Jaipur detonated in Johari Bazaar, near the restaurant and causing multiple casualties. The coordinated attacks, later claimed by the Indian Mujahideen, killed 80 people and injured over 200, marking Jaipur's worst-ever terror incident.

== See also ==
- Jaipur
- Rajasthani cuisine
- Dal bati churma
- Hawa Mahal
- City Palace, Jaipur
- Jantar Mantar, Jaipur
