= Land equivalent ratio =

The land equivalent ratio is a concept in agriculture that describes the relative land area required under sole cropping (monoculture) to produce the same yield as under intercropping (polyculture).

== Definition ==
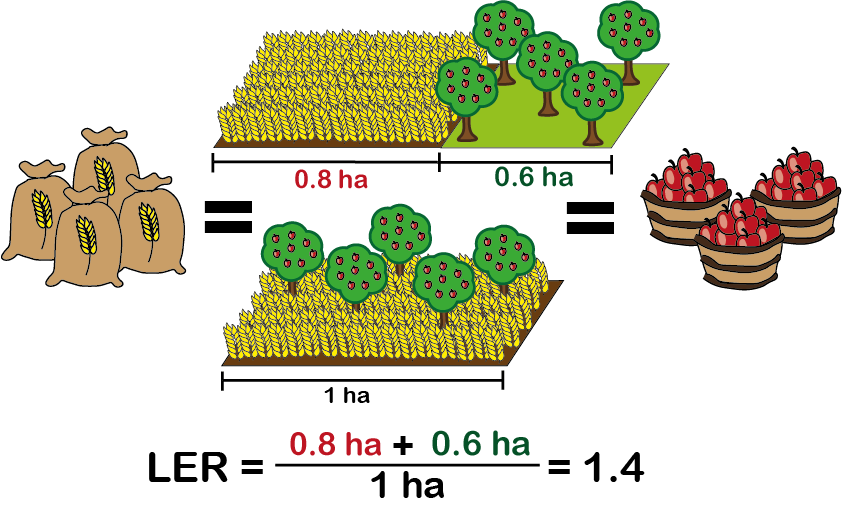
Land equivalent ratio

The FAO defines land equivalent ratio (LER) as:

the ratio of the area under sole cropping to the area under intercropping needed to give equal amounts of yield at the same management level. It is the sum of the fractions of the intercropped yields divided by the sole-crop yields.

For a scenario where a total of $\textstyle m$ crops are intercropped, the land equivalent ratio LER can be calculated as

$$LER = \sum_{i=1}^m {\frac{IY_i}{SY_i}}$$

where $\textstyle m$ is the number of different crops intercropped, $\textstyle IY_i$ is the yield for the $\textstyle i^{th}$ crop under intercropping, and $\textstyle SY_i$ is the yield for the $\textstyle i^{th}$ crop under a sole-crop regime on the same area.

== Example calculation ==
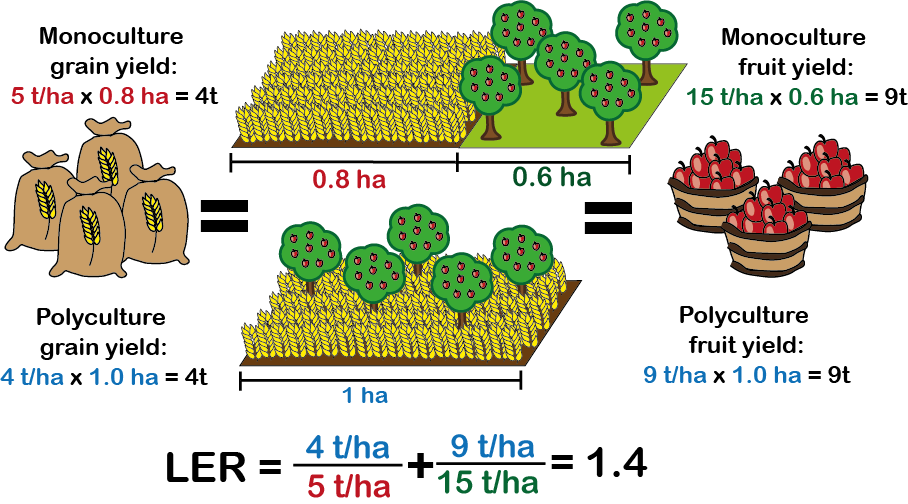
Land equivalent ratio

The table in this section provides yield values for a hypothetical scenario intercropping a grain crop with a fruit tree crop.

The first two columns state the yields for intercropping (IY) and sole yields (SY). The third column, equivalent area, column calculates the area of sole cropping land required to achieve the same yield as 1 ha of intercropping, at the same management level.

Crop	Intercropped Yield IY (kg/ha)	Sole Yield SY (kg/ha)	Equivalent area (ha)
Grain	4,000	5,000	0.8
Fruit	9,000	15,000	0.6
Land equivalent ratio			1.4

The land equivalent ration can be calculated as

$$LER = \sum_{i=1}^m {\frac{IY_i}{SY_i}} = \frac{IY_{grain}}{SY_{grain}} + \frac{IY_{fruit}}{SY_{fruit}} = \frac{4,000}{5,000} + \frac{9,000}{15,000} = 0.8 + 0.6 = 1.4$$

An interpretation of this result would be that a total of 1.4 ha of sole cropping area would be required to produce the same yields as 1 ha of the intercropped system.

== Applications ==
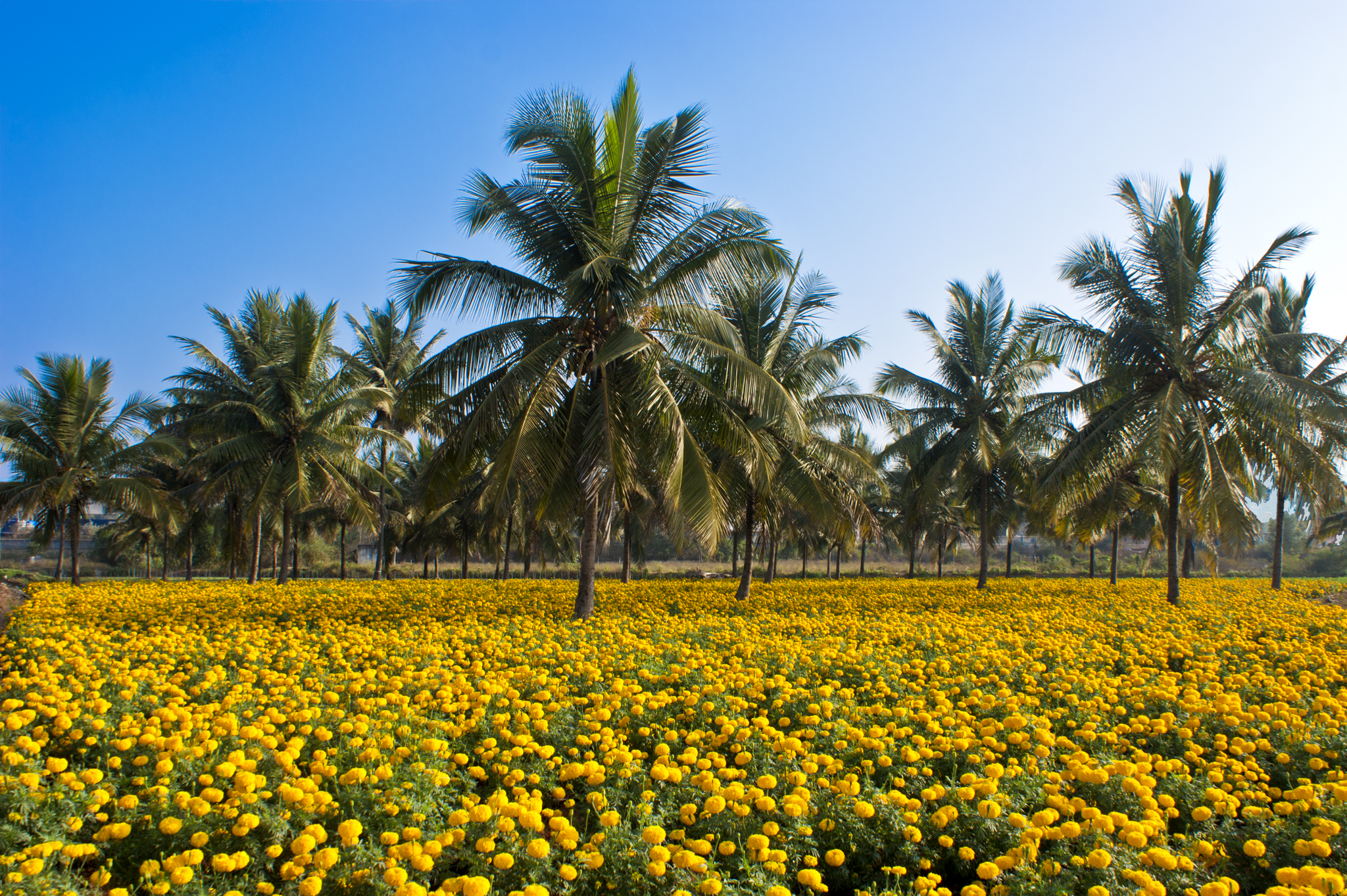
Intercropping of coconut and tagetes flowers

Agrivoltaic system

The land equivalent ratio can be used whenever more than one type of yield can be obtained from the same area. This can be intercropping of annual crops (e.g. sorghum and pigeonpea) or combination of annual and perennial crops e.g. in agroforestry systems (e.g. jackfruit and eggplant).

It is also possible to calculate LERs for combinations of plant and non-plant yields, e.g. in agrivoltaic systems.

The table below lists some examples for land equivalent ratios published in scientific journals:

Crops	Country/region	LER	Source
eggplant, jackfruit	Bangladesh	2.17	
cocoa, coconut	Mexico	1.36	
solar electricity, maize	Italy	1.23 - 2.05	
ginger, maize, soybean	Nepal	2.45	
maize, cowpea	Nepal	1.58	
millet, soybean	Nepal	1.40	
