= Legacy of Darkness =

Legacy of Darkness may refer to:

- Castlevania: Legacy of Darkness, a 1999 video game for the Nintendo 64
- A booster set for the Yu-Gi-Oh! Trading Card Game
- The first track on the album Blackthorn Asylum
