= LPD =

LPD or lpd may refer to:

- A US Navy hull classification symbol: Landing platform dock (LPD)
- Laser Phosphor Display, a large-format display technology
- Lean Product Development
- The Legendary Pink Dots, a European band
- Lighting power density
- Lincoln Police Department, Nebraska; see List of law enforcement agencies in Nebraska
- Line Printer Daemon protocol, in Unix-like operating systems
- Living Planet Database
- Louisville Police Department, now the Louisville Metro Police Department (LMPD)
- Lowell Police Department, Massachusetts, US
- Landespolizeidirektion (Provincial Police Directorate) in Austria; see Federal Police (Austria)#Command structure
- LPD433, license-free radio communications band
- Luteal phase defect
- Lymphoproliferative disorders, in which lymphocytes are produced in excessive quantities
- Live PD, an American reality television show
