= LR =

LR or Lr may refer to:

== Businesses and organizations ==
- Avianca Costa Rica, an airline, IATA airline code LR
- Latvijas Radio, a public radio broadcaster in Latvia
- Lenoir–Rhyne University in Hickory, North Carolina
- Lenong Regiment, an infantry regiment of the South African Army
- The Republicans (France) (Les Républicains), a political party in France
- Lloyd's Register, a technical and business services organisation and a maritime classification society

== Places ==
- Lithuania (Lietuvos Respublika, LR)
- Liberia (ISO 3166-1 alpha-2 country code LR)
  - .lr, the Internet country code top-level domain for Liberia
- Little Rock, Arkansas, United States

== Science, technology and mathematics ==
=== Computing ===
- LR parser, a type of parser in computer science
- Lexical resource, a database consisting of one or several dictionaries
- Link register, a special purpose register in computer architecture
- Adobe Lightroom, photography software program

=== Other uses in science, technology and mathematics ===
- L(R) (pronounced L of R), in set theory
- Lawrencium, symbol Lr, a chemical element
- .22 Long Rifle, a type of rimfire ammunition
- Limiting reagent, the reactant that is completely consumed in a chemical reaction
- Lactated Ringer's solution, an intravenous crystalloid resuscitative fluid

== Other uses ==
- Legislative route, a U.S. highway defined by laws passed in a state legislature
- Light rail, a type of rail-based passenger transport

== See also ==
- Long Range (disambiguation)
- Left and right (disambiguation)
