= Law Reports of the Commonwealth =

Commonwealth of Nations law reports

- Editorial consultant: Michael Kirby
- Categories: Law reports
- Frequency: Five volumes per annum
- First issue: 1985; 41 years ago
- Company: Professional Books (Note: Original publisher.); Butterworths (Note: Second publisher.); LexisNexis (Note: Third and current publisher, as of 2022.)
- Country: United Kingdom
- Based in: London
- Language: English
- Website: lexisweb.co.uk
- ISSN: 2049-4335
- OCLC: 1129044871

The Law Reports of the Commonwealth, abbreviated LRC, are a series of law reports of leading cases decided in the high, superior and appellate courts of member states of the Commonwealth of Nations. The LRC were first published in 1985 and, as of 2022, are published by LexisNexis of London in five volumes each year, in both digital and hard copy formats, with editorial guidance by Michael Kirby of Australia. The reports include judgments dating from 1980 to present. Initial volumes concerned only commercial law, but this scope was soon broadened to encompass constitutional and criminal law. The LRC now report cases concerning various areas of law, and further publish indexes of cases, and an annual analysis of trends in the legal practice of relevant jurisdictions. The series is deemed "authoritative" by the Commonwealth Secretariat, and are one of several reports preferred for case citations in the Caribbean Court of Justice.

== History ==
The LRC were founded after a 1983 Commonwealth law conference in Hong Kong, and were meant to supplement the Commonwealth Law Bulletin (photo shows a similar 2011 conference in Hyderabad, with secretary-general Kamalesh Sharma on middle right)

The LRC were first published in 1985 by Professional Books of Oxford, with the "active encouragement" and editorial advice of the Commonwealth Secretariat. The secretariat's work towards said publication is thought to have been prompted by an address by then-Secretary-General Shridath S. Ramphal to the seventh law conference organised by the Commonwealth of Nations in Hong Kong in 1983. They envisioned the law reports as a complement to the existing Commonwealth Law Bulletin. The founding editors included P. N. Bhagwati of India; Kutlu Fuad of Hong Kong; and James S. Read, Peter E. Slinn and P. St. John Smart of England. Early volumes (for cases decided during 1980 to 1984) reported only cases concerning commercial law; ensuing volumes (for cases decided in 1985 or later) expanded this scope to report cases on constitutional and criminal law too. By 1986, Butterworths of London, now LexisNexis, took over publication of the reports. In 1993, the three constituent series of the LRC, covering commercial, constitutional and criminal law each, were discontinued in favour of a single consolidated series. By 1994, the Commonwealth Secretariat described the LRC as "an authoritative and frequently cited source of precedents and judgments from around the Commonwealth". The reports celebrated the publication of their one-hundredth volume in 2009.

== Contents ==
The LRC "report key cases of international significance from all Commonwealth countries", including "judgments not reported elsewhere". The series now encompass, in addition to commercial, constitutional and criminal law, a broader remit of case law, including that regarding "arbitration, conflict of laws, environment, human rights, immigration, property and tort". Moreover, the reports publish an annual index of cases, an annual "analysis of legal trends in the Commonwealth", and an occasional cumulative index of cases.

== Citation ==
Citations to the LRC are the fourth-ranked preference for proceedings before the Caribbean Court of Justice, per practice direction from 2007. Cases reported in the LRC are cited as in the accompanying table. For instance, the first record of said table indicates that the decision of the Supreme Court of Judicature of Trinidad and Tobago, titled Juman v Attorney General of Trinidad and Tobago, was reported in 2017 in volume 2 of the Law Reports of the Commonwealth, with its text starting on page 610.

Format of case citations to the LRC.
Style of cause	(year of decision)	[year of report]	volume	report	(series)	page
Juman v Attorney General of Trinidad and Tobago		[2017]	2	LRC		610
He Kaw Teh v R		[1986]		LRC	(Crim)	553
Clarke v Karika		[1985]		LRC	(Const)	732

== See also ==
- Commonwealth Lawyers Association – relevant body

== Notes and references ==
=== References ===
1. "Arorangi Timberland Ltd & Ors v Minister of the Cook Islands National Superannuation Fund (Cook Islands)". The Judicial Committee of the Privy Council Decisions (Court judgment). London: British and Irish Legal Information Institute. 17 November 2016. Neutral citation [2016] UKPC 32.
2. "Nurse and Canserve Ltd v Republic of Trinidad and Tobago (Trinidad and Tobago)". The Judicial Committee of the Privy Council Decisions (Court judgment). London: British and Irish Legal Information Institute. 28 November 2019. Neutral citation [2019] UKPC 43.
3. "Gulf View Medical Centre Ltd v Tesheira (Trinidad and Tobago)". The Judicial Committee of the Privy Council Decisions (Court judgment). London: British and Irish Legal Information Institute. 25 October 2022. Neutral citation [2022] UKPC 38.
4. anon (1986). "Review of the activities of the Commonwealth Secretariat in the legal field". Commonwealth Law Bulletin. 12 (4): 1062–1081. doi:10.1080/03050718.1986.9985884.
5. anon (April 1990a). "Reviews and Notices". Commonwealth Law Bulletin. 16 (2): 672–691.
6. anon (July 1990b). "Review of the activities of the Commonwealth Secretariat in the legal field". Commonwealth Law Bulletin. 16 (3): 952–979. doi:10.1080/03050718.1990.9986091.
7. anon (1994). "Review of the activities of the Commonwealth Secretariat in the legal field". Commonwealth Law Bulletin. 20 (3): 1017–1092. doi:10.1080/03050718.1994.9986382.
8. anon (1996). "Review of the activities of the Commonwealth Secretariat in the legal field". Commonwealth Law Bulletin. 22 (1–2): 509–576. doi:10.1080/03050718.1996.9986450.
9. Bastide, M. A. de la (14 March 2007). "Practice Direction (Caribbean Court of Justice: Citation of Judgments and Reported Cases)". West Indian Reports. pp. 399–401.
10. Constance, Spheeris (1988). "Law Reports of the Commonwealth, Commercial Law Reports 1980–1984". International and Comparative Law Quarterly. 37 (2): 454–455. doi:10.1093/iclqaj/37.2.337.
11. Davies, Lisa; Tyson, Alice (February 2022). "Commonwealth countries: Commonwealth". IALS Library (Library guide). London: School of Advanced Study of the University of London.
12. Kirby, Michael (3 June 2009). "The hundredth volume of the Law Reports of the Commonwealth". Commonwealth Law Bulletin. 35 (2): 369–377. doi:10.1080/03050710902924619.
13. Lanigan, Jane (29 March 2012). "Law Reports of the Commonwealth: Editorial Review 2010". Commonwealth Law Bulletin. 38 (1): 129. doi:10.1080/03050718.2012.668779.
14. Newton, Velma (September 1988). "Standards for Court Libraries". Caribbean Journal of Legal Information. 5 (2): 6–13. ISSN 0255-7118.
15. Read, James S.; Slinn, Peter E. (6 January 2011). "The Commonwealth through the case law". Commonwealth Law Bulletin. 36 (4): 729–772. doi:10.1080/03050718.2010.524356.
16. Read, James S.; Slinn, Peter E. (29 March 2012). "The Commonwealth through the case law". Commonwealth Law Bulletin. 38 (1): 131–172. doi:10.1080/03050718.2012.646739.
17. Zammit Borda, Aldo (6 January 2011). "Law Reports of the Commonwealth: Editorial Review 2009". Commonwealth Law Bulletin. 36 (4): 727. doi:10.1080/03050718.2010.524354.
