= Virtual machine lifecycle management =

Virtual machine lifecycle management is the class of management that looks at the life cycle of a virtual machine from the viewpoint of the application vs one focused on roles within an organization. A number of major software vendors, including Microsoft and Novell, have begun to release software products aiming at simplifying the administration of larger virtual machine deployments.

== Environmental characteristics ==
Virtualized environments are fundamentally different from physical environments in architecture and capabilities. The flexibility they provide is derived from three fundamental characteristics:

1. Time: Over time, the topology of the environment changes with machines coming online and others going offline.
2. Motion: Unlike physical servers, virtual machines easily relocate around the data-center.
3. Transparency: With no physical presence, virtual machines cannot be seen, identified, touched or often, missed.

== Effects ==
These characteristics come together to define all the benefits of virtualization, from cost-savings to disaster recovery. However, they also change the nature of management of the infrastructure itself. The emerging space of Virtual Machine Lifecycle Management is the result of the time, motion and transparency qualities of virtual environments. This need cuts across software development and operations, encompassing all segments of the ITIL framework:

1. Service Strategy – As virtualization extends from a transparent back-end alternative to a full infrastructure offering within the organization, Virtual Machine Lifecycle Management provides the granular controls to enable wholly new delivery models, from short-term provisioning to outsourced virtual machine hosting.
2. Service Design – When designing the virtual infrastructure services, administrators consider both the structure of the individual virtual machine given to the customer as well as the interactions between all of the virtual machines in the environment, as they come online, move, and expire
3. Service Transition – Virtual Machine Lifecycle Management augments the traditional set of requirements built into delivering an infrastructure component to the business. Best practices and specific tools can be used to create the right controls within each virtual machine, ensuring the behavior of all the machines is in line with the design.
4. Service Operation – Once operational, virtual environments are extraordinarily dynamic, by design. Above and beyond the complexity of a traditional operating environment, management needs can be minimized with strong controls set in the transition phase and ongoing monitoring and alerting specifically designed to address the unique characteristics of the virtual infrastructure.
5. Continual Service Improvement – As virtual environments mature and grow, internal customers and management will be keen to understand the savings and benefits of the paradigm, security groups will increasingly audit the infrastructure, and new chargeback methods will emerge to account for the new model. Virtual Machine Lifecycle Management tools, with their innate understanding of the environment and its transient and mobile nature, will deliver the metrics needed to demonstrate success to all the constituents.
