= LSI =

LSI may refer to:

== Science and technology ==
- Large-scale integration, integrated circuits with tens of thousands of transistors
- Latent semantic indexing, a technique in natural language processing
- LSI-11, an early large-scale integration computer processor that implemented the DEC PDP-11 instruction set
- Langelier saturation index, a measure for water's tendency to form scale
- Linear shift-invariant systems, the discrete equivalent of linear time-invariant systems

== Organizations ==
- LSI Corporation, a technology company founded in 1981 as LSI Logic Corporation
- Lynch Syndrome International, non-profit organisation supporting those affected by Lynch Syndrome
- Labour and Socialist International, a multinational federation of left wing political parties and trade unions active between 1923 and 1940
- Socialist Movement for Integration (Lëvizja Socialiste për Integrim), a political party in Albania
- Lear Siegler Incorporated, a technology company active from 1961 to 2002
- Lingkaran Survei Indonesia, a survey company in Indonesia

== Transportation ==
- Lake Superior and Ishpeming Railroad, a railroad service in Michigan, United States
- Sumburgh Airport (IATA airport code) in Shetland, Scotland

== Music ==
- "LSI (Love Sex Intelligence)", a single by The Shamen
- Long-string instrument, a musical instrument

== Other uses ==
- Landing ship, infantry, a type of troopship or post World War II a landing craft
- La Salle Institute, a college preparatory school
- Linguistic Survey of India, a survey of the languages of British India directed by G.A. Grierson
- Logical Sensory Introvert, a socionics type
- Lighting & Sound International, a trade magazine
