= Location search optimization =

Process of improving website visibility

Location search optimization (LSO) is the process of improving the visibility of a website or a webpage by reaching more readers through location-enabled devices. The LSO is a step in a line of web optimization methods, which began with search engine optimization (SEO) to boost search rankings, and social media optimization (SMO) to make content more sharable. With mobile phones and location-enabled devices becoming the more prevalent way in which consumers access the internet and search on the web and search engines like Google personalizing search results based on user location, LSO can be important for ensuring content is accessible and sharable around a place or location.

== Impact ==
The effectiveness of location-based search optimization has grown significantly, primarily due to the increasing use of mobile devices for searching and purchasing products and services. Mobile usage has changed consumer behavior, with users now more likely to act on searches made closer to a business's physical location. Studies show that 76% of people who conduct a local search on their smartphone visit a business within a day, and 28% of those searches result in a purchase.

This behavior demonstrates the value of location-based search optimization. Users are frequently searching for nearby businesses, making queries like "restaurants near me" or "shoe stores near me." This trend has become known as "micro-moments" — when consumers seek information or take action on a specific need, often resulting in an immediate purchase. According to Think with Google, proximity and immediacy are key factors: 69% of consumers expect a business to be within five miles of their location, and more than half of those searching want to make a purchase within the hour.

Advances in geotargeting and contextual relevance have enhanced local search optimization. Search engines increasingly integrate real-time location data, search history, and contextual signals, for highly personalized and immediate recommendations. For example, mobile queries containing "___ near me now" grew by over 150% in the US between July-December 2015 and July-December 2017. More broadly, mobile searches with a combination of "open", "now" and "near me" grew by over 200% during the same period.

=== Influence on Digital Advertising ===
Location-based targeting also enhances the performance of digital advertisements. For example, Google Ads' "Location Extensions" allow businesses to show ads to users in specific geographic areas, thereby increasing relevance and effectiveness. Studies reveal that ads with local information see a higher click-through rate (CTR) and can drive up to a 20% increase in CTR compared to non-location-based ads.

Additionally, mobile optimization and seamless site experiences are critical factors in retaining users. According to Think with Google, 29% of smartphone users will switch to another site if they cannot find what they need, indicating that a streamlined and fast-loading mobile experience is essential for converting location-based searches into sales.

== See also ==
- Local search engine optimisation
- Social media optimization
- Search engine marketing
