= LS =

LS may refer to:

== Arts and media ==
- Lisburn Standard, a Northern Irish newspaper
- Lost Souls (online game), a text-based role-playing game

== Businesses ==
- LS Group, a Korean company
- Jet2.com (IATA code: LS), a British airline

== Currencies ==
- Latvian lats (Ls or ℒ𝓈), former currency of Latvia
- Sudanese pound, currency of Sudan, abbreviated to LS or £Sd
- Syrian pound, currency of Syria, abbreviated to LS or £S

== Latin ==
- Lewis and Short (abbr. "L&S"), authors of the 1879 work A Latin Dictionary
- Lectori Salutem (L.S.), Latin for 'Greetings Reader' and used as opening words to a letter
- locus sigilli, Latin for 'place of the seal', used in notarized and legal documents; see: Seal (contract law)

== Occupations and ranks ==
- Land Surveyor
- Leading Seaman, a junior non-commissioned rank in several navies
- Logistics Specialist, a rating in the United States Navy
- Long snapper, a special teams player in American football

== Organizations ==
=== Education ===
- La Salle (disambiguation), several educational institutions
- Lincoln-Sudbury Regional High School, Massachusetts, US
- Loyola Schools, the college unit of the Ateneo de Manila University in Quezon City, Philippines

=== Government and politics ===
- Liberal Party of Croatia (Croatian: Liberalna stranka or LS), a Croatian political party active from 1998–2006
- Liberal Democratic Party (Serbia, 1989), formerly known as the Liberal Party and abbreviated as LS
- Liberals of Serbia, a defunct political party in Serbia
- Liberals' Movement (Lithuania), a political party in Lithuania
- Lok Sabha, the lower house of the Parliament of India

== Places ==
- Lesotho (ISO 3166-1 country code: LS), a country in southern Africa
- LS postcode area, UK, covering Leeds
- County Laois, Ireland
- La Salle (disambiguation), several places

== Science, technology, and mathematics ==
=== Astronomy ===
- Light-second (ls), a unit of length in astronomy equivalent to the distance light travels in one second
- Local Supercluster (LS) or Virgo Superclaster, our galaxy supercluster

=== Biology and medicine ===
- Lung surfactant, a lipoprotein complex
- Legius syndrome, also known as Neurofibromatosis 1-like syndrome, a genetic disorder
- Lichen sclerosus, a skin disease
- Linnean Society of London, postnominal LS
- Live sand, in aquaria, sand populated with bacteria and organisms to aid in dissolving organic wastes

=== Computing and electronics ===
- ls, a command specified by POSIX and by the Single UNIX Specification; used for listing files
- .ls, the internet top-level domain for Lesotho
- Link-state routing protocol, used in packet-switching networks
- Location Services, a component of Microsoft's System Center Configuration Manager software
- LS, a low-power Schottky version of a 7400 series chip

=== Mathematics ===
- Least squares, a regression analysis
- Löwenheim–Skolem theorem, a theorem in first-order logic dealing with the cardinality of models

=== Other uses in science and technology ===
- Land Surveyor
- LS coupling, interaction between quantum numbers

== Transportation ==
- LS, a generic trim of Chevrolet vehicles
- LS, a model prefix on sailplanes made by Rolladen-Schneider Flugzeugbau GmbH
- LS 90, a Czech and Slovak train protection system
- Lexus LS, a full-size luxury sedan produced by Lexus
- Lincoln LS, a mid-size luxury sedan produced by Lincoln
- GM LS engine, a V-8 engine in General Motors cars

== Other uses ==
- LaVeyan Satanism, a religious group
