= LMV =

LMV may refer to:

- Lidköpings Mekaniska Verkstads, an engineering manufacturer in Lidköping, Sweden
- Iveco LMV, a 4WD tactical vehicle
- The ISO 639-3 code for the Lomaiviti language
- Madivaru Airport (IATA: LMV)
- Lettuce mosaic virus
