= LSL =

LSL is a three letter abbreviation which may refer to:

== Sports ==
- Leicestershire Senior League, a football competition
- Leinster Senior League (association football)
- Leinster Senior League (cricket)
- Leinster Senior League (rugby union)

== Computers ==
- Leisure Suit Larry, a series of adult adventure games
- Linden Scripting Language, a scripting language
- Logical shift left, a type of bitwise operation
- Larch Shared Language, a language for algebraic specification of abstract data types

== Finance ==
- LSL Property Services, a UK-based company
- Lincoln Savings and Loan Association, the financial institution at the heart of the Keating Five scandal
- Lesotho loti, currency of the Kingdom of Lesotho by ISO 4217 code

== Other uses ==
- LSL (gene), a human gene
- LSL World Initiative, founded by former Prime Minister of Haiti Laurent Lamothe
- Laminated strand lumber, a type of engineered wood
- Landing Ship Logistics, an amphibious warfare vessel of the United Kingdom
- Lead service line, a pipe made of lead that connects between a water main to the water user's location
- Liberty Shoes Limited, an Indian footwear manufacturer
- Locomotive Services Limited, a train operator in England
- Long service leave, an employee vacation payable after long service in Australia and New Zealand
- Lower Specification Limit, a statistical measure used in a Process Window Index bounded by UCL/LCL and USL/LSL
