= La Consolacion College =

La Consolacion College may refer to the following schools owned and administered by the Association of Schools of the Augustinian Sisters of Our Lady of Consolation:

Philippines

- La Consolacion University Philippines, in Malolos City, Bulacan
- La Consolacion College Manila, in Manila
- La Consolacion College Bacolod, in Bacolod City
- La Consolacion College Biñan, in Biñan City, Laguna
- La Consolacion College Daet, in Daet, Camarines Norte
- La Consolacion College Iriga, in Iriga City, Camarines Sur
- La Consolacion College – Novaliches, in Deparo, Novaliches, Caloocan
- La Consolacion College Caloocan, in Dagat-Dagatan, Caloocan
- La Consolacion College Bais, in Bais City, Negros Oriental
- La Consolacion College La Carlota, in La Carlota City, Negros Occidental
- La Consolacion College Liloan, in Liloan, Cebu
- La Consolacion College Murcia, in Murcia, Negros Occidental
- La Consolacion College Pasig, in Pasig
- La Consolacion College Tanauan, in Tanauan City, Batangas
- La Consolacion College Valenzuela, in St. Jude Subdivision, Malinta, Valenzuela City
- La Consolacion College Isabela, in Isabela, Negros Occidental
- La Consolacion School of Balagtas, in Balagtas, Bulacan
- La Consolacion School – Gardenville, in Tangub, Bacolod City
