= LC2 =

LC2 or LC-2 may refer to:

- Cape Canaveral Air Force Station Launch Complex 2, a deactivated US Air Force launch site
- Lancia LC2, a series of racing cars
- LC, Swansea or LC2, a leisure centre in Swansea, South Wales
- LC2 (classification), a para-cycling classification
- LC-2, a chair designed by architect Le Corbusier
- Macintosh LC II, an early 1990s era computer manufactured by Apple Computer
- Vandenberg AFB Space Launch Complex 2, an active rocket launch site in California, USA
- Xichang Launch Complex 2, an active rocket launch site in the People's Republic of China

== See also ==
- Launch Complex 2 (disambiguation)
- LCII (disambiguation)
- LCLC (disambiguation)
- LCC (disambiguation)
- IC2 (disambiguation)
- LC (disambiguation)
