= LCC =

LCC may refer to:

== Organizations ==
=== Education ===
- La Consolacion College (disambiguation), several colleges
- La Costa Canyon High School
- Lakeland Community College
- Lakewood Cultural Center
- Lane Community College
- Lansing Community College
- Laredo Community College
- LCC International University
- Leeds City College
- Leeward Community College
- Lethbridge Community College
- Lews Castle College
- Lexington Community College
- Life Chiropractic College
- Lima Central Catholic High School
- Lincoln Christian College and Seminary
- Lithuania Christian College
- Liverpool Community College
- London College of Communication
- Lower Canada College
- Lower Columbia College

=== Companies ===
- Language Computer Corporation
- Littleton Coin Company
- US Airways Group (former New York Stock Exchange ticker symbol)
- Leeds Children's Charity, England
- Light Car Company

=== Politics ===
- Local Coordination Committees of Syria
- League of Communists of Croatia
- Latvian Central Council

=== Local government in England ===
- Lancashire County Council
- Lancaster City Council
- Leeds City Council
- Leicester City Council
- Leicestershire County Council
- Lincolnshire County Council
- Liverpool City Council
- London County Council (1889–1965)

=== Other organisations ===
- Law Commission of Canada
- Leinster Cricket Club, Ireland
- Liberal Catholic Church
- Lisburn Cricket Club, Northern Ireland
- Loyalist Communities Council, Northern Ireland
- Lutheran Church–Canada

== Transport ==
- Two US Navy hull classification symbols: Landing craft, control (LCC) and Amphibious command ship (LCC)
- Launch commit criteria
- Launch Control Center, at Kennedy Space Center
- Lochluichart railway station (National Rail station code), Scotland
- London congestion charge
- London Cycling Campaign
- Low-cost carrier, an airline that emphasizes low fares

== Science and technology ==
- LCC (compiler), Local C Compiler or Little C Compiler
- Lambert conformal conic projection, map projection
- Landscape conservation cooperatives, a network of regional conservation bodies covering the entire United States and adjacent areas
- Large-cell carcinoma, a group of malignant neoplasms
- Launch control center (ICBM)
- Leadless chip carrier, a type of connection for integrated circuit chips.
- Leaf and branch compost cutinase, an enzyme capable of breaking down tough plant matter and PET plastic
- Line-commutated converters, for high-voltage direct current

== Other uses ==
- Life-cycle cost
- Library of Congress Classification, United States, subject categorization for books
- Lithuanian Civil Code, Civil Code of Lithuania
- Little Cottonwood Canyon, a glacially-carved canyon in the Wasatch Range near Salt Lake City in the United States
- Louisiana Civil Code, Civil Code of Louisiana
- Low context culture, a culture's tendency not to cater towards in-groups
- Lydian Chromatic Concept of Tonal Organization, a 1953 jazz music theory book
- "LCC", a song by electronic group Autechre, from the album Untilted
