= Launch Complex 2 =

Launch Complex 2 may refer to:

- Cape Canaveral Air Force Station Launch Complex 2, a deactivated US Air Force launch site
- Vandenberg AFB Space Launch Complex 2, an active rocket launch site in California, USA
- Xichang Launch Complex 2, an active rocket launch site in the People's Republic of China
- Rocket Lab Launch Complex 2, a space rocket launch site in Virginia, USA

== See also ==
- Launch Complex (disambiguation)
- LC2 (disambiguation)
