= LCS1 =

LCS1 or variant, may refer to:

- USS Freedom (LCS-1), a U.S. Navy corvette, lead-ship of the Freedom-class littoral combat ship
- Lincoln Calibration Sphere 1, an inert spherical aluminum in-space Earth-orbiting satellite used for calibration designed by the Lincoln Laboratory

== See also ==
- LCSI
- LCS (disambiguation)
