= Josine Desplanques =

Augustinian nun and mystical poet (1478–1535)

Josine Desplanques (1478–1535) was an Augustinian nun and mystical poet from the Low Countries.

== Life ==
Desplanques was born to a wealthy family in Tournai in 1478. She was orphaned by the age of ten and her guardians wasted her inheritance. She moved to Ghent to live with an uncle, and in 1506 entered the Augustinian convent of St Agnes. She was eventually elected prioress of the community. As superior she focused on improving the convent's finances and buildings. She died in Ghent in 1535.

== Works ==
- Gheestelicke refreynen
