= LC =

LC or Lc may refer to:

== Arts and media ==
=== Gaming and play ===
- Lego Chess, a Lego-based chess video game
- Lego City, a theme of Lego
- Lego Creator, a theme of Lego
- Lego Creator (video game), a Lego video game
- Limbus Company, a strategy role-playing video game
- Lethal Company, an early access cooperative survival horror video game
- Liberty City (Grand Theft Auto), a fictional city in the Grand Theft Auto computer and video game series

=== Music ===
- LC (album), 1981 album by The Durutti Column
- Lacuna Coil, an Italian gothic metal band
- Living Colour, an American hard rock band formed in New York
- Los Campesinos!, a British indie-rock band formed in Cardiff

=== Other uses in arts and media ===
- Licensed Companion, from the In Death novels of J.D. Robb (Nora Roberts)
- Shop LC, a 24/7 American shopping television channel
- Library of Congress Classification, a system of library classification

== Businesses, organisations, and government agencies ==
=== Government agencies ===
- Irish Land Commission (or simply Land Commission), a rent fixing commission by the Land Law (Ireland) Act 1881
- Library of Congress, the de facto US national library
- Liquor Control, including the Liquor Control Board of Ontario and the Manitoba Liquor Control Commission
- Local Council (Uganda), a form of local elected government within the districts of Uganda
- Loudoun County Transit, abbreviated as LC Transit
- Technical Department of the Ministry of Aviation (Nazi Germany) in charge of research and development (LC, but more often referred to as C-amt)
- Lucknow-Kanpur Suburban Railway, a state-operated commuter rail service in the Kanpur-Lucknow region of India

=== Religious organizations ===
- Latin Catholic Church, or Roman Catholic Church
- Legion of Christ, a Roman Catholic religious order of priests
- Liberty Counsel, a legal organization dedicated to advancing specific religious freedoms

=== Schools ===
- Lafayette College, a private college in Easton, Pennsylvania, US
- Laguna College, a non-sectarian, private school in San Pablo City, Laguna
- Landmark College, a private college in Putney, Vermont, US for students with learning disabilities
- Launceston College (Tasmania), a public senior-secondary school in Launceston, Tasmania, Australia
- Letran College in Manila, Philippines
- Lewis and Clark Community College, a community college in Godfrey, Illinois, US
- Lomagundi College, an independent, boarding school in Mashonaland West, Zimbabwe
- Loomis Chaffee, a coeducational boarding school in Windsor, Connecticut, US
- Lynchburg College, a private liberal arts college in Lynchburg, Virginia, US
- Lynden Christian Schools, a private school in Lynden, Washington, US

=== Other businesses and organizations ===
- Latvian Way, a political party of Latvia
- LC Perú, a Peruvian airline
- Lean Cuisine, a brand of microwaveable meals
- Happen Bank, NYSE ticker symbol LC
- Lotta Continua, a former far-left extra-parliamentary organization in Italy
- Varig Logística (IATA airline designator LC)

== Economics and finance ==
- Letter of credit, a document issued to provide a payment undertaking
- Local currency, also referred to as Local Currency Unit or LCU

== People ==
- Lorne Cardinal, stage and television actor
- Leonora Carrington, Mexican painter/surrealist
- Liz Claiborne, fashion designer
- Les Claypool, bassist best known for his work with Primus
- Leonard Cohen, Canadian singer, songwriter, musician, poet, and novelist
- Laveranues Coles, New York Jets wide receiver
- Lauren Conrad, fashion designer and former reality TV star on The Hills and Laguna Beach
- Le Corbusier, architect, and a series of furniture designed by same

== Places ==
- Las Cruces, New Mexico, US
- LC, Swansea, a Leisure Centre in Wales
- Leicester, a city in the UK
- Lewis Center, Ohio, US
- Little Compton, Rhode Island, US
- Lučenec, a town in Slovakia
- Saint Lucia (ISO 3166-1 country code)

== Science and technology ==
=== Biology, ecology, and medicine ===
- × Laeliocattleya, a genus of orchids
- Langerhans cell, a tissue-resident macrophage
- Least Concern, a World Conservation Union "Red List of Threatened Species" category* Lethal concentration, a means to quantitatively indicate a gas or aerosol hazard
- Lignocellulose
- Locus coeruleus, a noradrenergic nucleus in the brain stem
- Long COVID, a term for aftereffects occurring after recovering from and presumed to be caused by COVID-19

=== Electronics and computing ===
- .lc, the country code top level domain (ccTLD) for Saint Lucia
- Macintosh LC family, a range of personal computers manufactured by Apple in the early 1990s
- Macintosh LC, the first computer in the Macintosh LC family
- LC-type optical fiber connector
- LC circuit, in electronics, a circuit with an inductor and a capacitor
- Linear cryptanalysis, a form of cryptanalysis
- Lines of code
- Logic cell, in Field-programmable gate arrays
- Libera Chat, an IRC network

=== Vehicles ===
- Toyota Land Cruiser, an SUV built by Toyota Motor Corporation
- Lexus LC, a grand tourer built by Toyota Motor Corporation
- Geely LC, a hatchback car
- Landing craft, used to convey infantry and vehicles to shore in an amphibious assault

=== Other uses in science and technology ===
- Launch Complex (disambiguation), a rocket launch site
- Late Cycladic, an archaeological period
- Leading coefficient, in mathematics
- Leeuwin Current, a warm ocean current
- Liquid chromatography, an analytical chemistry technique
- Liquid crystal, a phase of matter with properties between a solid and a liquid state, commonly used in displays

== Other uses ==
- Law corporation, a special type of limited liability corporation available for single attorneys in California
- Leaving Certificate, the final course in the Irish secondary school system
- Letter case, used in orthography and typography to denote the difference between capital and non-capital letters
  - Lower case lettering
- Level crossing, on some maps, an intersection of a railway line and road at the same level
- Loc. cit. (loco citato), in citations, used to repeat a citation, including the page to which the citation refers
- Long course, an Olympic-size swimming pool
- Lord Chancellor, a senior functionary in the government of the UK

== See also ==
- LCLC (disambiguation)
- LCC (disambiguation)
- LCS (disambiguation)
- LLC (disambiguation)
