= La Consolacion University Philippines =

Roman Catholic university in Bulacan, Philippines

- Pamantasang La Consolacion sa Pilipinas (Filipino)
- Former names: Colegio de Nuestra Señora del Carmen (1937–1967); Regina Carmeli College (1967–1997); University of Regina Carmeli (1997–2011)
- Motto: Unitas, Caritas, Veritas (Latin)
- Motto in English: Unity Charity Truth
- Type: Private Catholic research Non-profit Coeducational Basic and Higher education institution
- Established: May 1, 1937; 89 years ago
- Founder: Augustinian Sisters of Our Lady of Consolation
- Religious affiliation: Roman Catholic (Augustinian Sisters)
Academic affiliations
| ACUCA ASAIHL; ASAS | NCEA, PAASCU, PACUCOA |
- President: Sr. Niceta M. Vargas, OSA, Ph.D.
- Principal: Sr. Evangeline B. Algaba, OSA (Basic Education Department)
- Location: Valenzuela St., Capitol View Park Subdivision, Barangay Bulihan Malolos, Bulacan, Philippines; 14°51′10″N 120°48′45″E
- Campus: Urban Main Barasoain Malolos Extension; Catmon campus Catmon Malolos 5 hectares (50,000 m^{2}); Rosaryville, Guiguinto (preschool and grade school)
- Patron Saint: Blessed Virgin Mary (under the title Our Lady of Consolation)
- Alma Mater song: Solidarity Song LCUP
- Colors: Blue and White
- Nickname: Consolanians
- Website: www.lcup.edu.ph
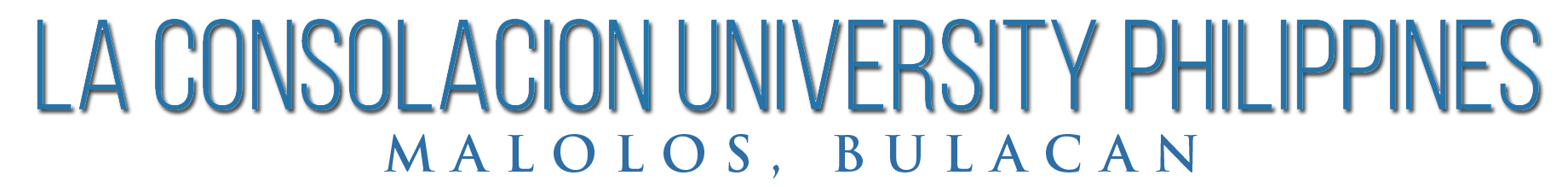

- Location in Bulacan Location in Luzon Location in the Philippines

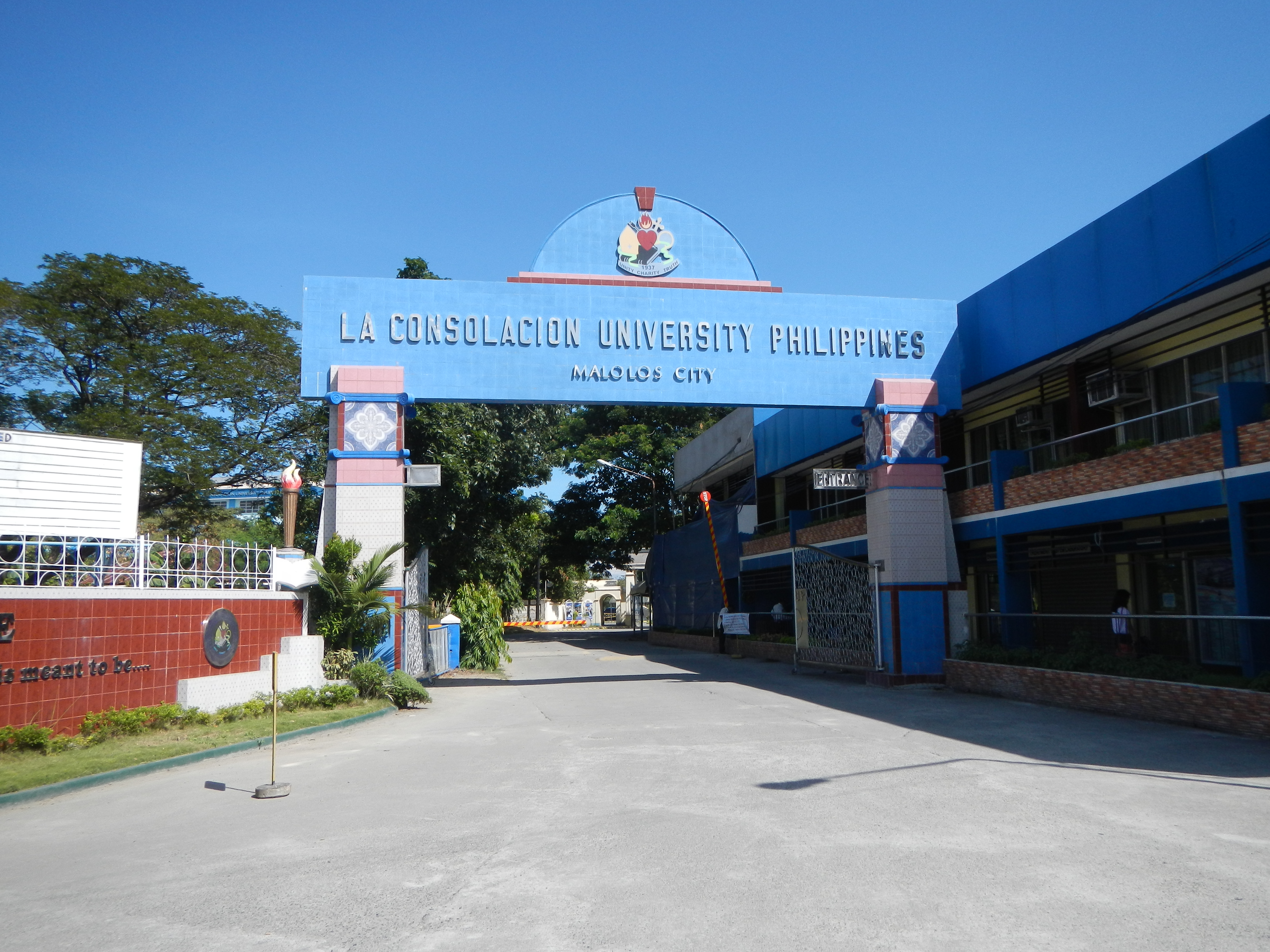
Gate

La Consolacion University Philippines (LCUP; Filipino: Pamantasang La Consolacion sa Pilipinas) is a private Catholic co-educational basic and higher education institution administered by the Augustinian Sisters of Our Lady of Consolation (ASOLC) in Malolos, Bulacan, Philippines. It was established by the Augustinian Sisters in 1937, originally named Colegio de Nuestra Señora del Carmen. It was later renamed Regina Carmeli College in 1967.

In December 1997, the Commission on Higher Education granted university status to the school, and it was renamed University of Regina Carmeli (URC). In January 2011, the Augustinian Sisters once again changed the name of the school to La Consolacion University Philippines, in accordance with a congregational decision that all schools being run by the Augustinian Sisters of Our Lady of Consolation in the Philippines carry the name “La Consolacion".

== History ==
=== Founding ===
In May 1937, the Colegio de Nuestra Señora del Carmen was established by five Augustinian sisters. It initially offered early childhood education and elementary courses. In 1967, it was renamed to Regina Carmeli College. The school gained university status from the Commission on Higher Education in December 1997 and was renamed to University of Regina Carmeli.

=== Recent developments ===
In January 2011, the school changed its name to La Consolacion University Philippines after a congregational decision that all schools under operation by the Augustinian Sisters carry one name.

== Academics ==
=== Colleges ===
La Consolacion University Philippines has 6 colleges:

- College of Allied Medical Professions
- College of Medicine
- College of International Tourism and Hospitality Management
- College of Business, Entrepreneurship and Accountancy
- College of Arts, Sciences and Education
- College of Information Technology and Engineering

== See also ==
- La Consolacion College - Baao, Camarines Sur
- La Consolacion College - Bacolod, Negros Occidental
- La Consolacion College - Biñan, Laguna
- La Consolacion College - Daet, Camarines Norte
- La Consolacion College - Iriga, Camarines Sur
- La Consolacion College - Manila, Metro Manila
- La Consolacion College - Liloan, Cebu
- La Consolacion College - Novaliches, Caloocan, Metro Manila
