= La Consolacion College Daet =

Roman Catholic college in Camarines Norte, Philippines

La Consolacion College of Daet
- Former names: Daet Parochial School (1948‑1970); La Consolacion School of Daet (1970‑1986)
- Motto: Unitas Caritas Veritas (Latin)
- Motto in English: Unity Charity Truth
- Type: Private Roman Catholic Non-profit Coeducational Basic and Higher education institution
- Established: 1948; 78 years ago
- Founder: Monsignor Antonino O. Reganit
- Religious affiliation: Roman Catholic (Augustinian Sisters)
- Academic affiliations: PAASCU CEACAL; CEAP BACS ASAS
- President: Sr. Delia S. Juliano, OSA, LPT, MAEM
- Students: 2,284
- Location: Froilan Pimentel Avenue, Daet, Camarines Norte, Philippines; 14°06′42″N 122°57′24″E
- Campus: Urban
- Colors: Blue and White
- Nickname: Consolites
- Website: lcc-daet.edu.ph
- Location in Camarines Norte Location in Luzon Location in the Philippines

The La Consolacion College Daet is a private Catholic school run by the Augustinian Sisters of Our Lady of Consolation (ASOLC) in Daet, Camarines Norte, Philippines. It was founded in 1948 and named Daet Parochial School by Monsignor Antonino O. Reganit, the then parish priest of St. John the Baptist Parish.

The founder's dream of putting up a Catholic co-educational institution in the parish was made a reality by the generosity of the Daet Parishioners and the moral and financial support extended by Msgr. Pedro P. Santos, Bishop of Nueva Caceres, and the then governor of the province, Hon. Governor Wilfredo Panotes.

The school opened on July 5, 1948, with 220 young children as the initial batch of enrollees. Named Daet Parochial School, the school graduated its first elementary pupils on April 11, 1949, of school year, 1948–1949 and its first high school students on April 15, 1953.

The school's operation and management was turned over to the Augustinian Sisters in SY 1949–1950 with Sr. Ambrosia, OSA as first Directress/Principal and Sr. Juana, OSA as the first Mother Superior.

With the turn over, the name of the school was changed from Daet Parochial School to La Consolacion School of Daet. This change came in 1970 at the advent of Vatican II. From then on, the Family Council (FC), an organization of parents and teachers of the school, and the Board of Trustees had been made functional.

The La Consolacion School of Daet adopted the Catholic Schools-Systems Development (CS-SD) Program and the Social Orientation-Education Program (SO-EP CIP) in 1983. The school went through a series of Congregational Evaluation Visits (CEV) with the aim of accreditation by the Philippine Accrediting Association of Schools, Colleges and Universities (PAASCU). While in the evaluation stage, the La Consolacion School of Daet worked for the offering of collegiate courses and was successfully granted permits and recognition to offer Liberal Arts, Commerce and Education courses. As La Consolacion College – Daet since 1986, the school now has 2,284 enrolled students.

== History ==
Four Catalan Augustinian Sisters arrived in Manila from the port of Barcelona, Spain, on April 6, 1883, to dedicate themselves to care for and educate the orphans of the 1882 cholera epidemic by establishing the Asilo-Colegio de Manadaloya. More Spanish Sisters came the following year but the tedious work and social condition of the country forced most of the Sisters to return to Spain with the exception of Sisters Rita and Joaquina Barcelo Y Pages.

When the Filipino-American War broke out, the remaining Spanish Sisters were forced to abandon the first ten Filipino Sisters. In 1899, these Filipino Sisters took possession of the Franciscan buildings in Sampaloc and opened an asilo-colegio just in time for the start of classes in June. In 1902, through the beseeching of the clergy, the orphanage-school became a full-pledge academic institution whose objective was to provide training to those intending to pass the civil service exam that the students might be able to teach in the public schools. The first to be recognized of all private schools in Manila, G. A. O'Reilly, Superintendent of Private Schools, described it "most proficient".

Many years before the outbreak of World War II, a dream for a Catholic school had already been conceived by the parish priests who were assigned in the Parish of St. John the Baptist. It was only in 1948, however, with the assignment of Rev. Msgr. Antonino O. Reganit as the parish priest, that the dream became a reality.

After the fury of typhoon "Jean" in January 1948, Msgr. Antonino O. Reganit busied himself with the reconstruction of the damaged convent which he promised to convert into a parochial school. With the support of his assistant Parish Priest Rev. Fr. Salvador I. Naz and the efforts exerted by Mr. Lucio Magana, co-founder and the first principal together with the parishioners and the then Hon. Gov. Wilfredo Panotes, the Daet Parochial School came into existence.

On the historic day of July 5, 1948, 220 school children enrolled at the Daet Parochial School, making it as one of the Catholic Educational institutions in Camarines Norte. The school had its first commencement exercises on April 11, 1949, with 18 pupils graduating from the elementary course.

Upon the request of Bishop Pedro Santos, D.D., the Augustinian Sisters of the Philippines agreed to manage the school beginning SY 1949–1950 with Sor. Ma. Ambrosia Marte, OSA as Mother Superior. In SY 1950–1954, it was Sor Salvadora de la Circumcision, OSA who became the Principal. The legacy brought by the Augustinian Sisters and the pioneer teachers were carried on until the first High School graduation on April 15 of 1953. Sor Ma. Victoria de la Resurreccion, OSA became the Directress for SY 1955–1956.

== Academics ==
K to 12

Senior High School

- Academic Track
  - Accountancy, Business and Management Strand
  - General Academic Strand
  - Humanities and Social Science Strand
  - Science, Technology, Engineering and Mathematics Strand
- Technical Vocational Livelihood Track
  - Combination A
    - Food and Beverage Services NCII
    - Bread and Pastry Production NCII
    - Cookery NCII
  - Combination B
    - Housekeeping NCII
    - Local Tour Guiding NCII
    - Front Officer Services NCII
    - Tourism Promotion Services NCII
  - Computer Systems Servicing NCII

College Courses

- Bachelor of Science in Computer Science
- Bachelor of Science in Hospitality Management
- Bachelor of Science in Information Systems
- Bachelor of Science in Nursing
- Bachelor of Science in Tourism Management

== Libraries ==
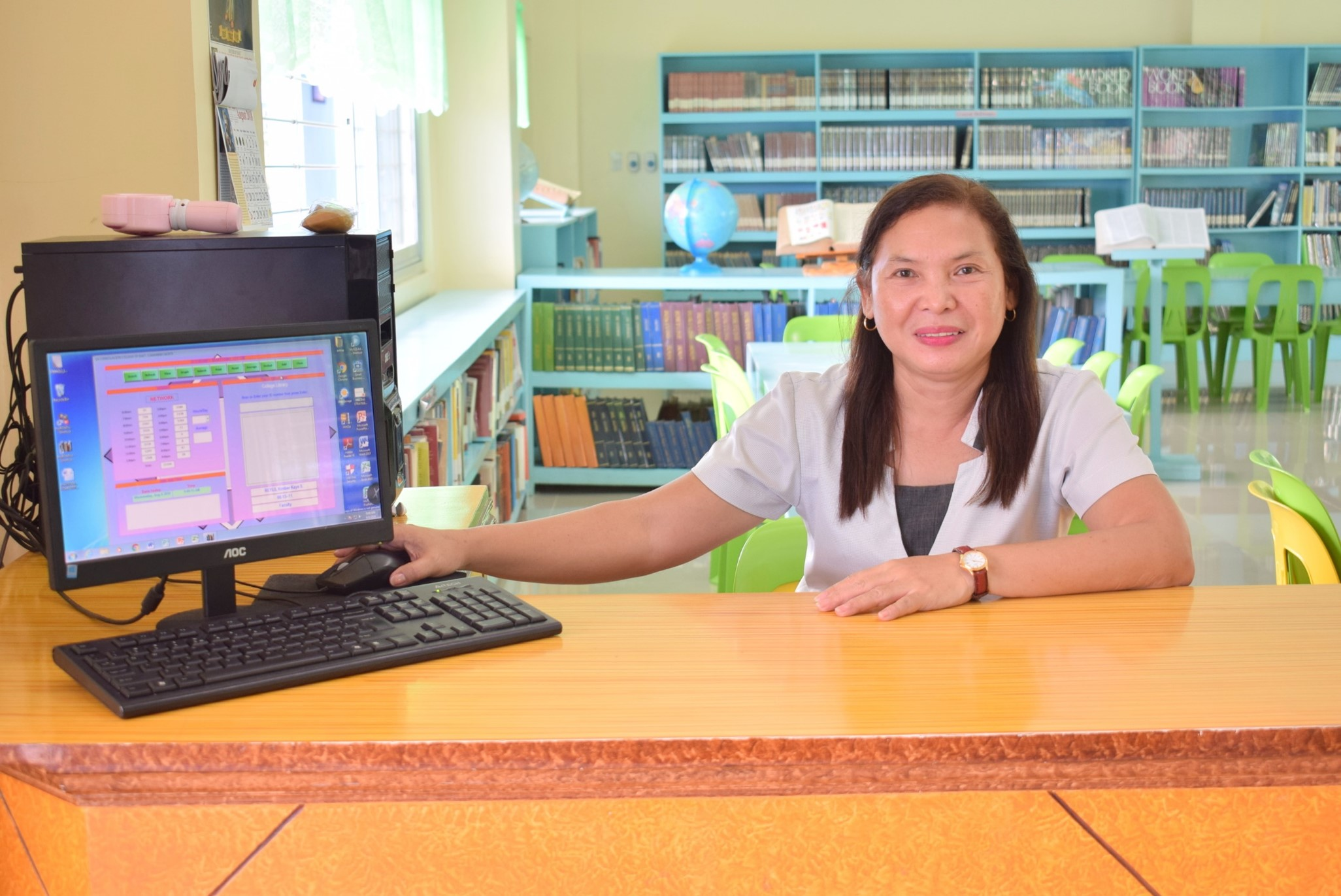
Basic Education Department Library

The LCCD library consists of two libraries: Basic Education library and College Education library.

== See also ==
- La Consolacion College - Bacolod, Negros Occidental
- La Consolacion College – Biñan, Laguna
- La Consolacion College - Iriga, Camarines Sur
- La Consolacion College – Manila, Metro Manila
- La Consolacion College – Novaliches - Caloocan, Metro Manila
- La Consolacion University Philippines, Malolos, Bulacan
