= LCLC =

LCLC may refer to:

- Large-cell lung carcinoma
- lateral collateral ligament complex, of the radial collateral ligament of elbow joint
- Loving Couples Loving Children, a curriculum at the Building Strong Families Program
- LaSalle Computer Learning Center of the Florida Technical College

== See also ==
- LC (disambiguation)
- LC2 (disambiguation)
