= LCII =

LCII or variation, may refer to:

- Macintosh LC II, 1990s personal computer
- LC II pelvic fracture in the Young-Burgess classification
- Local Council II, a type of local administration in Uganda; see Local Council (Uganda)
- Late Cypriot II period, a period of the Mediterranean Bronze Age in the Late Bronze Age collapse
- LCI Industries, see List of S&P 600 companies

== See also ==
- LC2 (disambiguation)
- LCI (disambiguation)
