= Maria Giovanna Fasce =

Blessed Maria Giovanna Fasce OSA
- Born: 27 December 1881; Torriglia, Genoa, Kingdom of Italy
- Died: 18 January 1947 (aged 65); Cascia, Perugia, Italy
- Venerated in: Roman Catholic Church
- Beatified: 12 October 1997, Saint Peter's Square by Pope John Paul II
- Feast: 18 January, 12 October (Augustinians)

Maria Giovanna Fasce (27 December 1881 – 18 January 1947) was an Italian Roman Catholic professed religious of the Augustinian nuns in the religious name of "Maria Teresa". Fasce served in various leadership positions in her convent in Genoa and was noted for the establishment of an orphanage and spreading the charism of Saint Augustine and Saint Rita of Cascia.

Fasce was beatified at Saint Peter's Square on 12 October 1997.

== Life ==
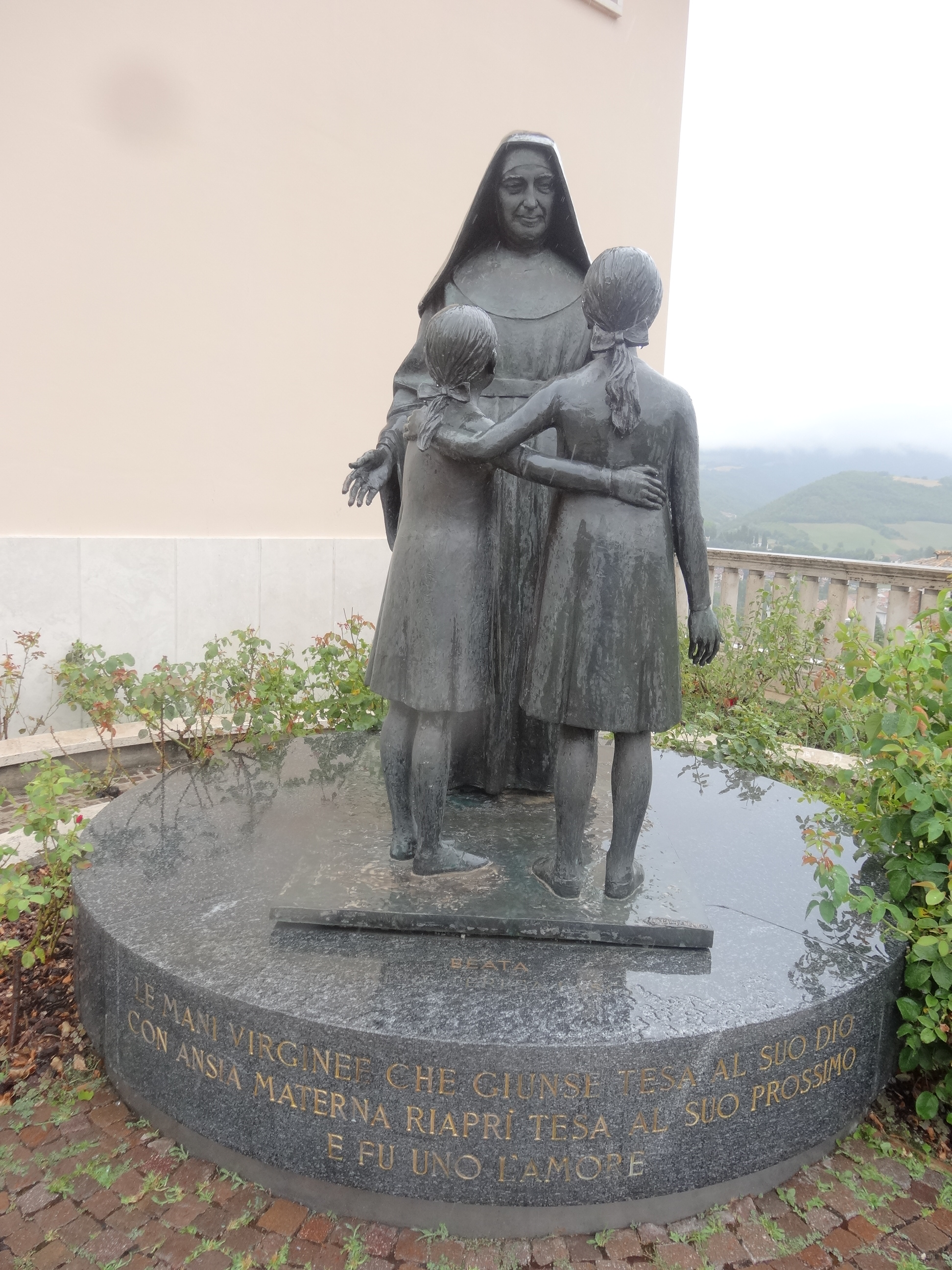
Statue of Maria Giovanna Fasce at the Santuario di Santa Rita in Cascia

Maria Giovanna Fasce was born on 27 December 1881 in Genoa to the middle-class Eugenio Fasce and his second wife Teresa Valente. She had seven siblings and her oldest sibling was Luigia. Her relations dubbed her as "Marietta". Her mother died in 1889 which prompted her oldest sister Luigia to take care of Fasce.

Fasce taught catechism to children and grew to love the charism of Saint Augustine. She also met her confessor Father Mariano Ferriello in Genoa who encouraged her to learn of the Augustinian figures and pursue her vocation. She also became aware of the life of Rita of Cascia and travelled to Rome in 1900 when Pope Leo XIII canonized her – this was the most important event of her life thus far and solidified her desire to become a nun. She expressed this intention to her relations who took the news bad and her brothers in particular were negative about it. Her oldest sister Luigia accepted this but did not understand Fasce's reasoning for living in a primitive place like Cascia. Her family wanted her to go to a closer monastery in Savona, but she wished to go to the same Cascia monastery as Rita. She applied for admission to a Ligurian convent but was rejected much to her surprise. The Abbess Giuseppina Gattarelli said that she believed Fasce was unable to handle the rigors of the monastic life.

Fasce reapplied and entered the convent of the Order of Saint Augustine on 22 June 1906. She received the habit on the night of 25 December 1906 and made the profession of her initial vows on 25 December 1907 in the religious name of "Maria Teresa". She became quite disillusioned due to the convent's decline and returned home in June 1910 for a period of deep reflection. Her time at home saw her affirm her desire to be in the monastic life and returned to the convent in May 1911 and later made her solemn vows on 22 March 1912. She was appointed as novice mistress on 17 July 1914 at the time of World War I and was then vicar of her convent from 1917 until 1920. The unanimous decision of the convent's leadership saw her made abbess on 12 August 1920 and she held that post until her death.

In 1923 she began the circulation of the newsletter "Dalle Api alle Rose" (first edition published 22 May 1923) to promote the almost unknown chapel that contained the remains of Rita of Cascia and desired bringing people to God through the saint she admired. Fasce suffered from a malignant tumor on her right breast and had to undergo two operations on it. She referred to her tumor as her "treasure" that was the most beautiful gift that Jesus Christ had given her. She suffered from diabetes and asthma and also became overweight which caused walking difficulties – fellow nuns also had to move her in a chair later in her tenure.

Her goal was the construction of a girl's orphanage which began construction in 1925 and finished in 1938 though she had to depend on donations and work was slow due to the bad economic climate and the onslaught of World War II. She referred to the orphan girls as her "bees" and the first girl to be admitted into the new orphanage was Edda Petrucci. She organized pilgrimages to Cascia and dedicated herself to building a sanctuary for pilgrims and worshippers.

Fasce died in 1947. Her remains were placed next to those of Rita of Cascia. Though construction of the new church (later named to a minor basilica) faced bureaucratic and financial obstacles, it was completed in May 1947, just four months after Maria Teresa's death on 18 January.

== Beatification ==
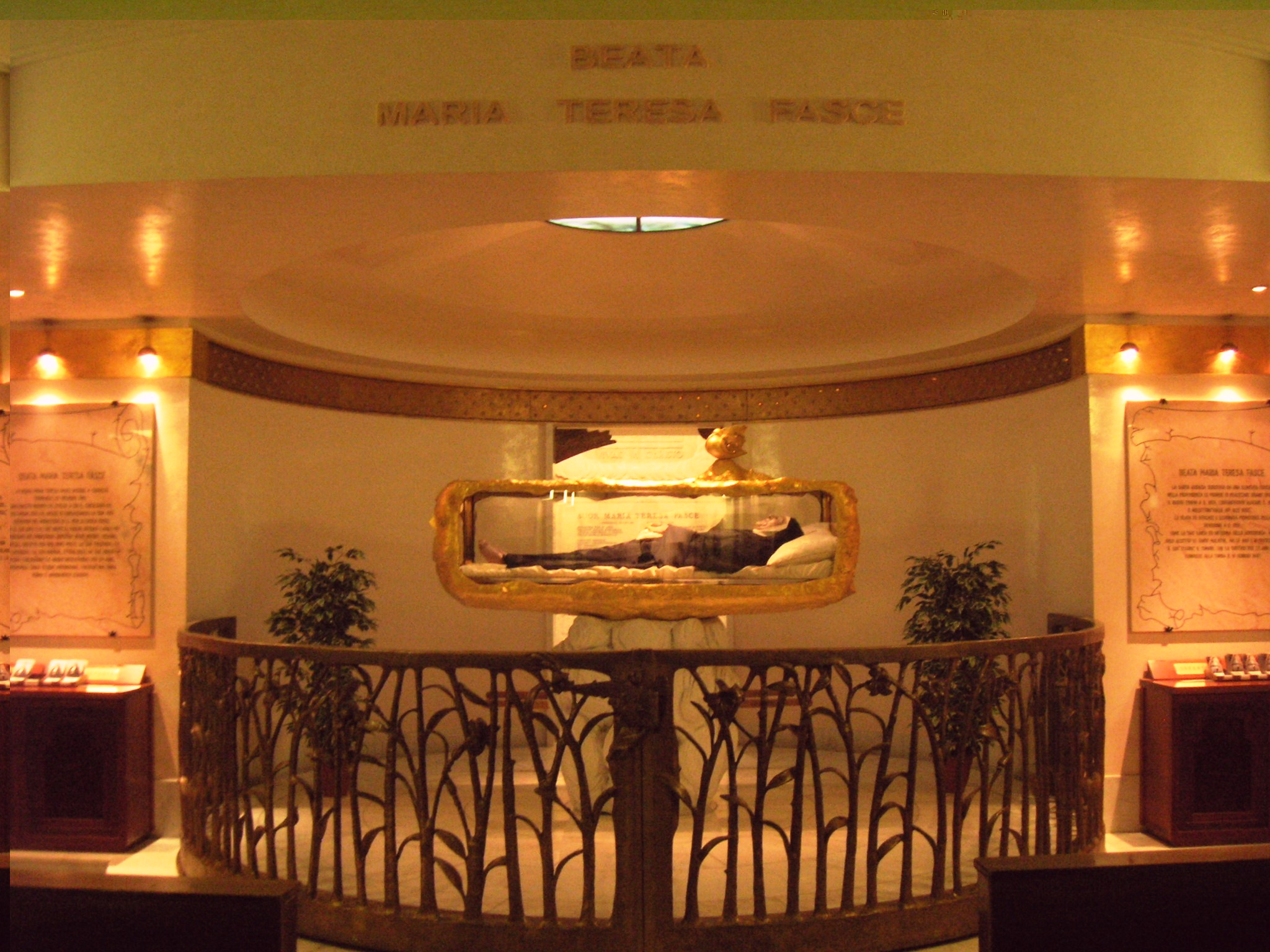
Relics of Maria Giovanna Fasce in the lower Basilica of Santa Rita

The beatification process commenced in the Diocese of Spoleto-Norcia in an informative process that commenced on 5 August 1968 and concluded its business on 5 June 1971. The Congregation for the Causes of Saints validated the process on 6 May 1988 in Rome. Pope John Paul II proclaimed Fasce to be venerable on 11 July 1995 after confirming that the religious had lived a model Christian life of heroic virtue. John Paul II approved a miracle due to Fasce's intercession on 7 July 1997 and beatified her on 12 October 1997.
