= Language Computer Corporation =

Research company

- Type: Private
- Industry: Software, Research and development, Natural Language Processing
- Founded: 1995
- Headquarters: Richardson, Texas
- Products: Question Answering and Information Extraction products
- Number of employees: 12 (2010)
- Website: LanguageComputer.com

Language Computer Corporation (LCC) is a natural language processing research company based in Richardson, Texas. The company develops a variety of natural language processing products, including software for question answering, information extraction, and automatic summarization.

Since its founding in 1995, the low-profile company has landed significant United States Government contracts, with $8,353,476 in contracts in 2006-2008.

While the company has focused primarily on the government software market, LCC has also used its technology to spin off three start-up companies. The first spin-off, known as Lymba Corporation, markets the PowerAnswer question answering product originally developed at LCC. In 2010, LCC's CEO, Andrew Hickl, co-founded two start-ups which made use of the company's technology. These included Swingly, an automatic question answering start-up, and Extractiv, an information extraction service that was founded in partnership with Houston, Texas-based 80legs.
