= La Consolacion College Bacolod =

Roman Catholic college in Bacolod, Philippines

- Former name: Colegio de la Nuestra Señora de la Consolación (1919–1943)
- Motto: Unitas Caritas Veritas (Latin)
- Motto in English: Unity Charity Truth
- Type: Private, Catholic, Research, Coeducational, Basic and Higher education institution
- Established: March 12, 1919; 107 years ago
- Founder: Augustinian Sisters of Our Lady of Consolation
- Religious affiliation: Roman Catholic (Augustinian Sisters)
- Academic affiliations: PAASCU, CEAP, PAIR, PACUCOA, ASAS, PESPA
- President: Sr. Flolyn S. Catungal, OSA
- Vice-president: Romela R. Aujero, PhD, LPT, RGC, RPm, RPsy (VP for Administration and Alumni Relations); Sr. Irene M. Bancolo, OSA, DMEM (VP for Finance & General Services); Rodjhun B. Navarro, LPT, PhD (VP for Research, Publication, Innovation & Linkages)
- Location: Rizal Cor. Galo-Gatuslao Streets, Brgy 11, Bacolod City, Negros Occidental, Philippines; 10°40′15″N 122°56′53″E
- Campus: Main Campus Rizal Cor. Galo-Gatuslao Streets, Bacolod (Integrated School, College, Graduate School) Satellite Campuses; HRM and Tourism Center Campus Quezon Ave., Bacolod (School of Hospitality and Tourism Management); Villasor Campus Gardenville Subd., Tangub, Bacolod (Integrated School)
- Alma Mater song: Hail Alma Mater our LCC
- Patron saints: Blessed Virgin Mary (Under the title Our Lady of Consolation); Saint Augustine of Hippo; Saint Monica
- Colors: Blue and white
- Nicknames: LCCians, Consolanians
- Sporting affiliations: NOPSSCEA
- Mascot: Blue Panthers
- Website: www.lcc.edu.ph
- Location in the Visayas Location in the Philippines

La Consolacion College Bacolod, also referred to by its acronym LCCB or simply LCC, is a private, Catholic, co-educational basic and higher education institution administered by the Augustinian Sisters of Our Lady of Consolation (ASOLC) in Bacolod, Negros Occidental, Philippines.

Established on March 12, 1919, as Colegio de la Señora de la Consolacion by three Augustinian sisters – Sor Tomasa de la Sagrada Familia, Sor Maria Teresa de Jesus and Sor Alfonsa de la Santisima Trinidad, the college is the oldest institution of higher education in the province.

LCCB offers preschool, elementary, junior & senior high school, short-term, undergraduate and post-graduate courses. The school has three patrons - Our Lady of Consolation, St. Augustine of Hippo and St. Monica.

== History ==
Upon the request of Jaro Bishop, Dennis Dougherty, the three sisters began apostolate work in Negros due to the significant Aglipayan presence in the province. On July 15, 1919, Colegio de la Señora de la Consolacion accepted its first 86 students, 36 of whom were interns who lived in the school dormitory. It started as an all-girls school back then.

The school is named in honor of the Virgin Mary, Consoler of the Afflicted.

== Organization and Administration ==
School administration and organization is divided into two - The Integrated School and the Schools of the College Department.

== Academics ==
=== Integrated School ===
K-12 Education based on the 2011 Basic Education Curriculum is followed in the Day School System, a system called Unique by Design is applied by teachers. Special classes in Math and Science are offered, Advanced Math and Science to students part of the Crème Section starting from the Freshmen Batch of 2011–2012. Religious education is also implemented in the education system along with bookkeeping, animation and film making applied. A strict academic rule is followed that if students who get grades of 78 and below, but not below 76 in their report card are required to take remedial classes, and students who receive a general average grade of below 78 at the end of the year, are required to take remedial classes in the summer.

By the school year 2012–2013, a policy was pushed by the administration to utilize personal computers and the Internet in the curriculum. This policy led to the adoption of the DIWA learning system - Genyo E-learning System, which prompted the change of the classroom setting in the core subjects. Furthermore, plasma TVs and audio-visual materials used in teaching students were encouraged after the Galo wing renovation of the Integrated School Building was done. Changes in time schedules were also made - from the traditional 7:30am until 5:00pm (the most 5:30pm) class schedules, the new 8:00am–4:00pm class schedules were adopted. Wi-Fi hot spots and public computers were installed in the college campus for students to use in their academic needs.

=== Night High School ===
Four (4) Year High School Education based on the 2011 Basic Education Curriculum is also followed in the Night High School Program. The students who are enrolled in this program are financially challenged but deserving ones. The method of teaching applied is not limited to tutorials given by teachers, but students are expected to learn on their own as there is limitation to tutorials and lectures given by the teachers. Teachers who teach in this program are volunteers from the education departments of the institution. Classes usually start after the class hours of the Integrated School.

=== Senior High School ===
The Senior High School Department offers three primary tracks: Academic, Arts and Design, and Technical-Vocational-Livelihood (TVL). Each track is designed to cater to students' diverse needs, interests and career aspirations.

LCCB offers the following strands under these tracks:

- Academic - Science, Technology, Engineering and Mathematics (STEM), Accountancy and Business Management (ABM), Humanities and Social Sciences (HUMMS)
- Arts and Design - Visual Arts (VA), Architectural Drafting (AD)
- Technical, Vocational and Livelihood - Home Economics (TVL-HE), Tourism Management (TVL-TM), Information and Communications Technology (TVL-ICT)

=== College ===
The College Department is composed of four tertiary level schools: School of Business and Information Technology; School of Architecture, Fine Arts and Interior Design; School of Liberal Arts and Education and School of Hospitality and Tourism Management. The college also offers various programs under the LCCB Graduate School.

- School of Architecture, Fine Arts and Interior Design (SARFAID) - BS Architecture, BS Interior Design and BFA in Advertising/Industrial Design/Painting/Digital Media Arts
- School of Hospitality and Tourism Management (SHTM) - BS Tourism, BS Hospitality Management
- School of Business and Information Technology (SBIT) - BS Accounting Technology, BS Human Resource Management, BS Marketing Management, BS Information Technology, BS Computer Science
- School of Sciences, Liberal Arts and Teacher Education (SLATE) - AB English, Bachelor of Library & Information Science, BS Psychology, BS Biology, BS Technical Teacher Education, BS Elementary Education, BS Secondary Education
- School of Graduate Studies and Continuing Education - MBA, Master of Arts in Educational Management, Master of Arts in Religious Studies, Master of Arts in education, Doctor in Business Administration, Master of Science in architecture, Master of Science in Hospitality Management, Master of Arts in Guidance and Counseling.

== Campus ==
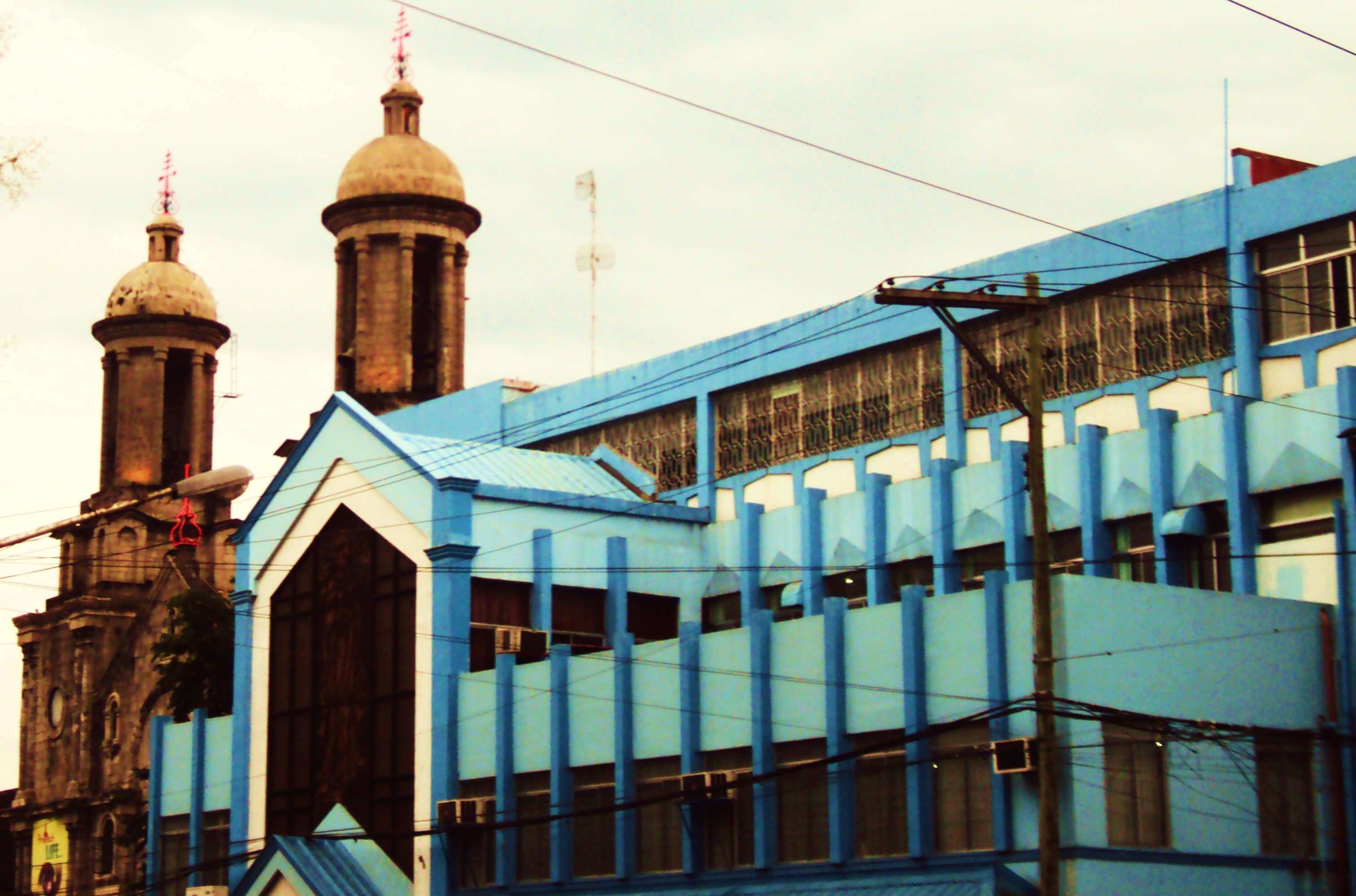
LCCB Main Campus

The Main Campus for both the Integrated School and College is located in Downtown Bacolod along the streets of Rizal (College) and Galo-Gatuslao (Integrated School). The buildings that compose the campus are the Basic Education Department Building divided into two wings, the Mother Consuelo Barcelo Activities Center, the main college building, the Sta. Monica Building and the quadrangle.

- The Integrated School Building - Formerly called Basic Education Department Building, divided into two wings, the Gatuslao Wing which faces the Gatuslao St. and is occupied by the Elementary classes of Grades 1-10 this is where the Chapel and the Elementary Faculty is located, this is probably the oldest structure that exists in the campus. The Galo Wing which faces Galo St. is occupied by the High School Department from Grades 7 and 8, the Pre-school and Kindergarten Department, High School faculty, the Center for Augustinian Formation, President's Office, Grade School and High School Computer Laboratories are all located here. In the meeting point of these two wings - the administration, principal and the guidance offices are located. In the evening the Night High School and the college students occupy the rooms in both wings. Renovation has been completed by the A.Y. 2012–2013, WiFi hotspots are found in the Gatuslao Wing. The renovation has prompted Administration to order installation of air conditioning systems in the classrooms. LED Lights are installed in the renovated wing to cut energy costs. It is where the Main Gate and Facade is located. The facade was designed by Japanese Engineer Paul Ishiwata in 1938. The facade's model is based on the White House of the United States and followed Old English and early American Colonial designs.
- Main College Building - Consists of laboratories both utilized by the college and the integrated school department, it composes of an internet center, audio-visual room, speech laboratory, Luisa Medel Little theatre, the Auditorium, finance office, the Clinic, administration offices of the college department and respective classrooms.
- The Mother Consuelo Barcelo Activities Center - Consists of the canteen, print center, college and high school library, respective classrooms of the college and the audio-visual center. To this date this building is considered the highest among the rest, it from the 5th floor Bacolod's skyline is visible, it is considered one of the highest structures in the city.
- The Quadrangle - composed of two basketball courts and two volleyball courts, and a stage. An entrance to San Sebastian Cathedral is located here.
- The Sta. Monica Building - occupied by SARFAID, classrooms are utilized by SARFAID students alone. The lobby is decorated by works of the students.

=== Villasor Campus (Gardenville) ===
The school has a swimming pool in the La Consolacion College Bacolod - Villasor Campus which is located in Gardenville Subdivision. The Integrated School and the AMISTAD Center are also found in this campus. College swim classes and swimming events are held in the campus. It is located adjacent to sister school La Consolacion School – Gardenville.

=== HRM and Tourism Center Campus ===
The SHTM Campus houses the HRM and Tourism Center and the Regional House that have Culinary Arts facilities and classrooms for the SHTM students.

== Notable alumni ==
- Susan Roces - Filipina actress and widow of Fernando Poe Jr. (GS, HS)
- Carmela Arcolas-Gamboa - Ms. Philippine Centennial, ABS-CBN Bacolod Lifestyle Host (GS, HS)
- Luisa Medel Reyes-Howard - Late Chairwoman of the Negros Occidental Centennial Movement, renowned and awarded as one of the Outstanding Institutions of the Country (HS)
- Odette Khan - Filipina actress, renowned for roles as a villain (HS)
- Modesto P. Sa-onoy - renowned historian of Bacolod and Negros Occidental (HS)

== See also ==
- La Consolacion College – Biñan, Laguna
- La Consolacion College - Daet, Camarines Norte
- La Consolacion College - Iriga, Camarines Sur
- La Consolacion College – Manila, Metro Manila
- La Consolacion College – Novaliches, Metro Manila
- La Consolacion University Philippines, Malolos, Bulacan
- Augustinian Province of the Most Holy Name of Jesus of the Philippines
- Augustinian Province of Sto. Niño de Cebu, Philippines
- Augustinian values
- List of tertiary schools in Bacolod City
