= LLC (disambiguation) =

LLC, or limited liability company, is the United States-specific form of a private limited company.

LLC or llc may also refer to:

== Computing ==
- Last level cache, of a computer CPU cache
- Logical link control, part of computer networking data link layer

== Organizations ==
- Laestadian Lutheran Church
- Laurentian Leadership Centre, of Trinity Western University, Canada
- Lendlease (stock market symbol), Australia

== Transport ==
- LHD Landing Craft, Australian name for the LCM-1E landing craft
- Small Planet Airlines (ICAO code)
- Cagayan North International Airport (IATA code)

== Other uses ==
- Lapu-Lapu City, Philippines
- "LLC" (song), a song by Money Man
- "LLC", a 2018 song by Nicki Minaj from the album Queen
- Lele language (Guinea), an ISO 639-3 code
