= La Consolacion College Biñan =

Roman Catholic college in Laguna, Philippines

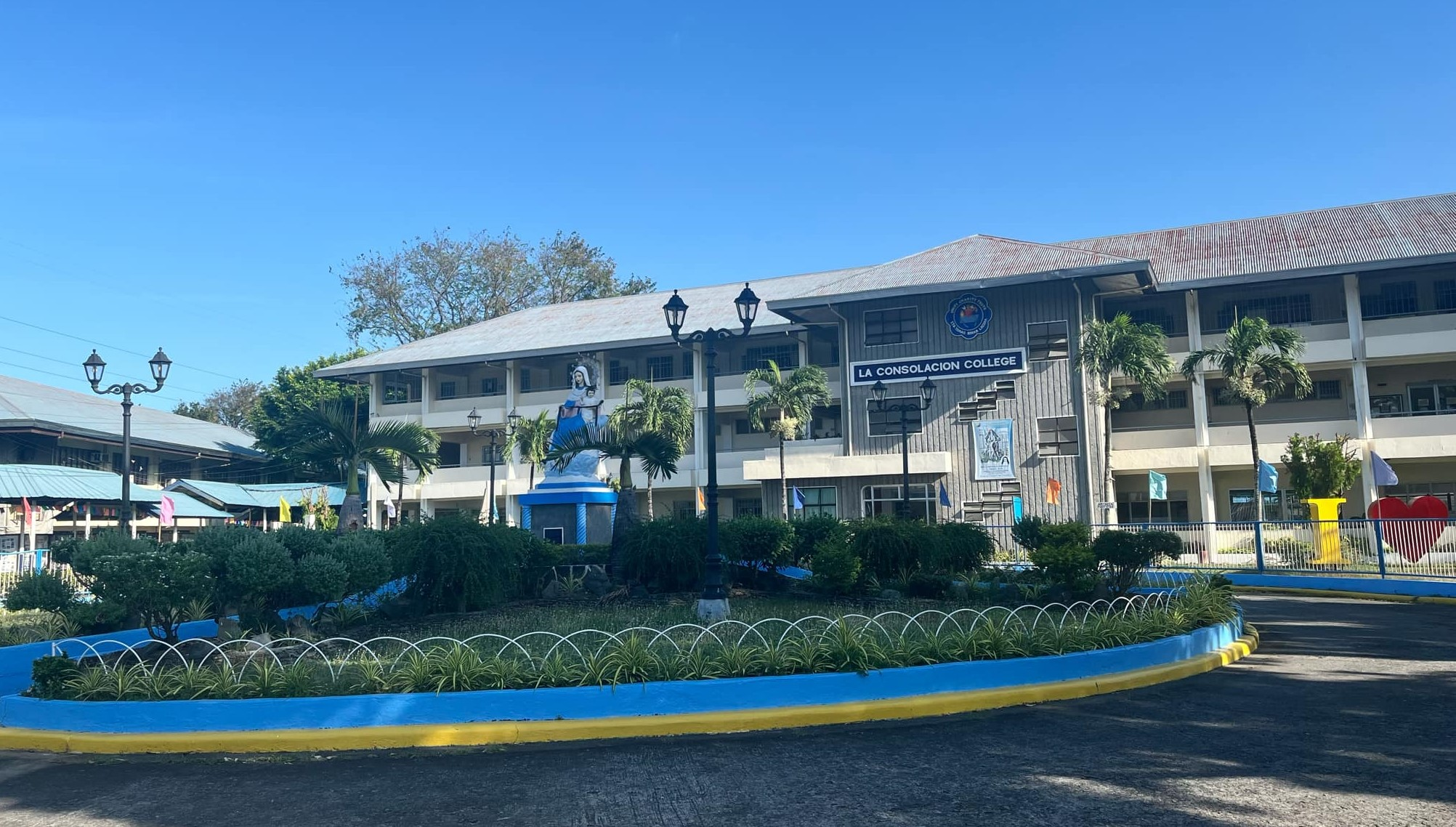
- Motto: Unitas, Caritas, Veritas (Latin)
- Motto in English: Unity Charity Truth
- Type: Private Roman Catholic; Non-profit Coeducational; Basic and Higher education institution
- Established: June 1985; 41 years ago
- Founders: Augustinian Sisters of Our Lady of Consolacion
- Religious affiliation: Roman Catholic (Augustinian Sisters)
Academic affiliations
CEAP PAASCU	FAAP PACUCOA
- President: Sr. Maria A. Garcia, OSA
- Principal: Laria P. Doronila
- Dean: Dr. Edna V. Sebastian
- Location: Biñan, Philippines; 14°19′35″N 121°04′41″E
- Colors: Blue and White
- Nickname: LCC Blue Royals
- Website: lccbinan.edu.ph

La Consolacion College Biñan, also referred to by its acronym LCCBñ, is a private, Catholic, co-educational basic and higher education institution owned and administered by the Augustinian Sisters of Our Lady of Consolation (ASOLC) in Sto. Tomas, City of Biñan, Laguna, Philippines. It was founded by the Augustinian Sisters in 1985.

== Historical background and perspective ==
=== History ===
It was in 1984 when the students of La Consolacion College, Mendiola, Manila conducted an educational survey in Biñan, Laguna, particularly in Barrio Sto. Tomas where many housing projects were being established. The need for a new school was seen based on the results of the survey. Hence, the Augustinian Sisters of Our Lady of Consolation decided to extend their educational efforts through the establishment of a school in Biñan in 1984.

The school initially offered Kinder I and II and Grades I to IV when it started operations in June 1985. The Sto. Niño Building, now known as St. Monica Building, housed 323 pupils in its initial operation. Also during this year, the Administrative, Supervisory and Non-Teaching Personnel were composed of the President of La Consolacion College, Manila, the Principal, 3 Teaching Sisters, 3 Lay Teachers, a Sister in-charge of the canteen, a janitor, a night security guard, a clerk and 2 aides.

Due to the increase in population, another edifice was built the following year. It was named Our Lady of Consolation Building which was later changed to St. Augustine Building. Additional basic education levels were offered i.e. Grade V to First Year High School.

The school year 1988-1989 facilitated the construction of the Pre-School building and the Sisters’ Cloister as answer to the need of a more growing population which registered 1,067 and 185 enrollees for the Elementary and High School Departments, respectively.

== Campus ==
- St. Monica Building
- St. Augustine Building
- Our Lady of Consolation Building
- Food Court
- St. Joseph Auditorium
- Mo. Rita Barcelo Building
- Sto. Niño Building
- Mo. Consuelo Barcelo Building
- St. Ezekiel Moreno Gymnasium

== Academic programs ==
Basic Education Department

- Pre-school Education, Kinder I and II
- Elementary Education (Grade 1–6)
- Junior High School(Grade 7–10)
- Senior High School(Grade 11-12)
  - Science, Technology, Engineering and Mathematics (STEM)
  - Accountancy and Business Management (ABM)
  - Humanities and Social Sciences (HUMSS)

College Department

- Bachelor of Science in Accountancy
- Bachelor of Science in Business Administration
  - Major in Marketing Management
- Bachelor of Science in Computer Science
- Bachelor of Science in Hospitality Management
- Bachelor of Science in Tourism Management
- Bachelor of Science in Psychology
- Bachelor of Secondary Education
  - Major in English
  - Major in Mathematics

== Institutional affiliations ==
- Catholic Educational Association of the Philippines

== See also ==
- La Consolacion College - Bacolod, Negros Occidental
- La Consolacion College - Daet, Camarines Norte
- La Consolacion College - Iriga, Camarines Sur
- La Consolacion College – Manila, Metro Manila
- La Consolacion College – Novaliches - Caloocan, Metro Manila
- La Consolacion University Philippines, Malolos, Bulacan
