= La Consolacion College – Novaliches =

Roman Catholic college in Caloocan, Philippines

La Consolacion College - Novaliches
- Dalubhasaan ng La Consolacion sa Novaliches (Filipino)
- Former names: La Consolacion School-Deparo (1995–); La Consolacion College-Deparo
- Motto: Unitas, Caritas, Veritas (Latin)
- Motto in English: Unity Charity Truth
- Type: Private Catholic Non-profit Coeducational Basic and Higher education institution
- Established: February 1995; 31 years ago
- Founder: Augustinian Sisters of Our Lady of Consolation
- Religious affiliation: Roman Catholic (Augustinian Sisters)
- Academic affiliations: PAASCU
- President: Sr. Ma. Luz F. Mijares, OSA
- Location: St. Peter Street, Villa Maria Subdivision; Deparo, Caloocan, Metro Manila, Philippines; 14°44′37.446″N 121°1′35.472″E
- Campus: Urban 5 hectares (50,000 m^{2})
- Patrons: Patron Saints; Augustine of Hippo; Monica of Hippo; Patroness; Blessed Virgin Mary (Under the title Our Lady of Consolation)
- Colors: Blue and white
- Nicknames: Consolinians; LCCians
- Sporting affiliations: ISBVL; ISAAL
- Website: www.lccn.edu.ph
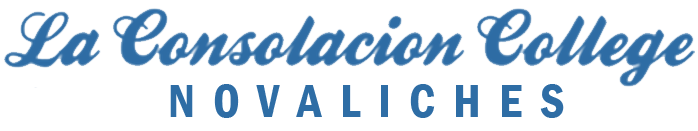

- Location in Metro Manila Location in Luzon Location in the Philippines

La Consolacion College – Novaliches, also known by its former name La Consolacion College - Deparo or colloquially LaCo [pronounced as /lakô/], is a private Catholic basic and higher educational institution administered by the Augustinian Sisters of Our Lady of Consolation (ASOLC) in Caloocan, Philippines. It was founded in February 1995 and is one of the two La Consolacion schools in the city of Caloocan, and one of the 24 schools owned and administered by the Augustinian Sisters.

La Consolacion College – Novaliches is the first Catholic educational institution in North Caloocan. The school also holds the distinction of having the largest contiguous campus in the CAMANAVA region.

== History ==
It was founded in February 1995 and incorporated by the Securities and Exchange Commission on March 30, 1995. It used to be known as La Consolacion School - Deparo when the high school and college levels were not yet open for enrollments. Upon the late 1990s, the school started using the name La Consolacion College - Deparo.

Deparo is a barangay in the northern district of Caloocan where the campus is situated. The former Saint Joseph Academy in Caloocan built in the vicinity of the old city hall, which is now known as La Consolacion College Caloocan was established much earlier in Barangay Dagat-dagatan, prior the Second World War. To avoid confusion with the campus in South Caloocan and to attract students from the nearby district of Novaliches, and the Bulacan towns of Meycauayan, Marilao, and San Jose del Monte, the administration opted the use of the name La Consolacion College – Novaliches.

== Student life ==
The students are grouped into sections named after Catholic saints who are mostly members of the Augustinian order, archangels, and titles of the Blessed Virgin Mary. Every beginning and end of each class, students are to pray Catholic prayers where at the end of the prayer is a call for the intercession of the section saint.

Students are engaged in several extra-curricular activities. The student body is represented and led by the Central Student Government, which holds elections a few weeks before the end of the school year for organizational transitions. The Central Student Government involves students from fourth grade and above. In order to purchase food from the cafeteria and several items in the school store, students are asked to use the tokens bearing the seal of the Augustinian Order, which they can purchase from stations around the campus.

The First Friday Masses are usually celebrated by the parish priest of the Mother of the Redeemer Parish of Deparo. During October, the students pray the Rosary every school day.

The flag ceremonies are held every school day with the singing of the National Anthem, the patriotic oath, and daily Catholic Gospel readings. Since 2002, the prayer for the beatification of Consuelo Barcelo is included in the morning rites. As part of Catholic tradition, everyone in the campus, including guests and staff, are required to pause during the praying of the Angelus at noon and the Divine Mercy First Prayer every three in the afternoon.

== See also ==
- La Consolacion College - Bacolod, Negros Occidental
- La Consolacion College – Biñan, Laguna
- La Consolacion College - Daet, Camarines Norte
- La Consolacion College - Iriga, Camarines Sur
- La Consolacion College – Manila, Metro Manila
- La Consolacion University Philippines, Malolos, Bulacan
