= Mattia Ciccarelli =

Italian nun

Blessed Mattia Ciccarelli OSA
- Born: 24 February 1481; Luco, Abruzzo
- Died: 18 January 1543 (aged 61); Aquileia
- Venerated in: Roman Catholic Church
- Beatified: 15 January 1841, Saint Peter's Basilica by Pope Gregory XVI
- Feast: 18 January, 12 February (in L'Aquila), 12 October (Augustinians)

Mattia Ciccarelli (24 February 1481 – 18 January 1543), in religious Cristina, was an Italian nun from the Order of Saint Augustine noted for her ecstasies and the reception of the stigmata. The religious was also known for her generous donations to the poor of the Abruzzo region despite being in the monastery.

== Life ==
Mattia Ciccarelli was born in 1481 in Luco dei Marsi as the last of six children to Domenico de Pericolo and Maria de Pericolo. An image of the Pieta was kept in the Luco home. Her call to the religious life solidified during her childhood and she decided to enter the religious life as a nun.

In 1492 she was placed under the spiritual direction of the Franciscan priest Vincenzo dell'Aquila and took his advice on joining the Order of Saint Augustine.

Ciccarelli entered the convent of Santa Lucia in Aquileia in June 1505 and assumed both the habit the religious name Cristina. She served as abbess several times and was noted for being a prophetic figure (who would receive ecstasies) and one who received visions on occasion. She became noted for her humble outlook as well as for her tender care of the poor. On one occasion – on the Feast of Corpus Christi – she was seen to have levitated and the image of the Eucharist as a host appeared and radiated from her upper chest. Another occasion – on Good Friday – saw her receive the stigmata and the pains that Jesus felt until Holy Saturday when the pain subsided. Her spiritual guide was Father Girolamo da Tussio. Ciccarelli also fostered a devotion to Mark the Evangelist and this led to an instance when, according to Ciccarelli, Martin of Tours appeared to her and asked why she had a devotion to the latter saint rather than to him – this prompted her to foster a devotion to him as well.

On one particular occasion a man accustomed to cursing blasphemed Anthony of Padua and she told him to be careful for if he continued to blaspheme she saw a black devil behind him set to choke him for such offences. The man – riding a donkey – did it again and was thrown to the ground where he fractured his skull and broke his neck which led to his death.

Ciccarelli died in 1543 after battling illness and was interred in the convent of Santa Lucia to the right side of the main altar. The suppression of Santa Lucia on 12 October 1908 saw her remains interred in the convent of Sant'Amico.

The first biographical account of her life came in 1595 after the nobleman Giampietro Interverj from l'Aquila decided to chronicle her life while the Belgian Augustinian scholar Cornelius Curtius printed another in the Latin language in Cologne.

== Beatification ==
The confirmation of Ciccarelli's longstanding popular devotion allowed for Pope Gregory XVI to approve her beatification on 15 January 1841.
