= IC2 =

IC2 may refer to:

- IC2, one of the British police's radio IC codes
- Intercity 2, railway service by Deutsche Bahn
- IC2 (Portugal), see Roads in Portugal
- Interdisciplinary Consulting Corporation, an aerospace sensor company in Florida, USA
