= LLC (song) =

2021 single by Money Man

Single by Money Man

from the album Blockchain
- Released: July 13, 2021
- Length: 2:17
- Label: Black Circle; Empire
- Songwriter: Tysen Bolding
- Producers: Nils; Trauma Tone

Money Man singles chronology
"Wired" (2021)	"LLC" (2021)	"Live Sum Mo" (2021)

Music video
- "LLC" on YouTube
- "LLC (Remix)" on YouTube

"LLC" is a song by American rapper Money Man, released on July 13, 2021. It was produced by Nils and Trauma Tone.

== Composition ==
The song contains piano-laden production and finds Money Man rapping through an Auto-Tune filter about his wealth. He also shouts out to NBA players Chris Paul, Devin Booker and Trae Young.

== Remix ==
An official remix of the song featuring American rapper Moneybagg Yo was released on November 12, 2021 as a track from Money Man's mixtape Blockchain. Alex Zidel of HotNewHipHop praised the collaboration, writing "Clearly, they've got strong chemistry and they sound too good together."

== Charts ==
Chart performance for "LLC"
Chart (2021)	Peak position
US Bubbling Under Hot 100 (Billboard)	10
US Hot R&B/Hip-Hop Songs (Billboard)	42

== Certifications ==
Region	Certification	Certified units/sales
United States (RIAA)	Gold	500,000^{‡}
^{‡} Sales+streaming figures based on certification alone.
