= La Consolacion College Iriga =

Private college in Camarines Sur, Philippines

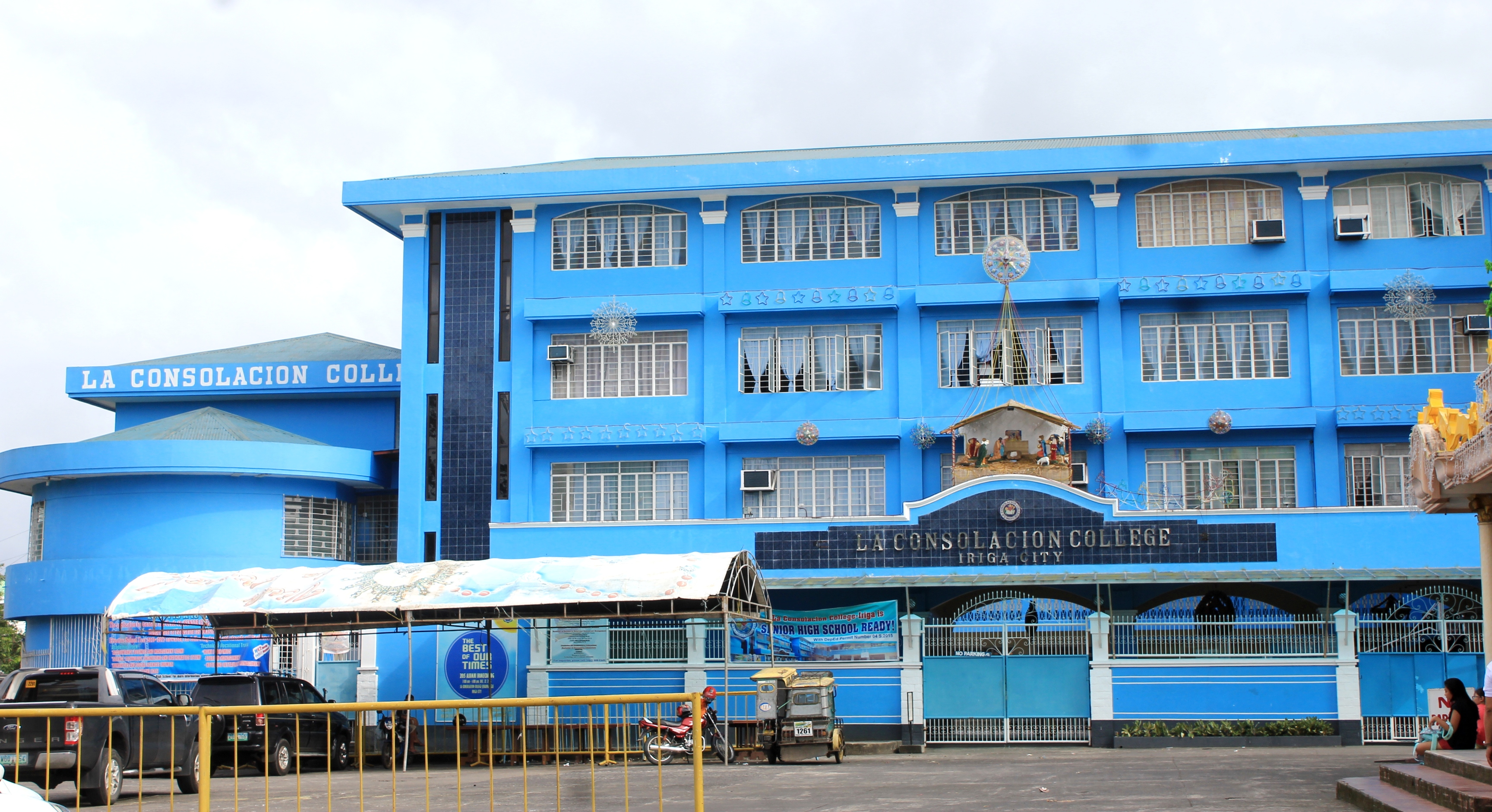
- Former name: La Consolacion Academy (June 1949-Sept 1992)
- Motto: Unitas Caritas Veritas (Latin)
- Motto in English: Unity Charity Truth
- Type: Private Catholic Non-profit Coeducational Basic and Higher education institution
- Established: 1949; 77 years ago
- Founder: Augustinian Sisters of Our Lady of Consolation
- Religious affiliation: Roman Catholic (Augustinian Sisters)
- Academic affiliations: PAASCU CEACAL; CEAP BACS ASAS
- President: Sr. Elizabeth Infante, OSA
- Principal: Ms. Jocyline O. Malinao
- Location: Barangay San Francisco; Iriga City, Camarines Sur, Philippines
- Campus: San Francisco, Iriga City
- Colors: Blue and White
- Nicknames: LCCians, Consolinians
- Website: http://lcc-i.edu.ph/

La Consolacion College Iriga is a private Catholic coeducational basic and higher education institution run by the Augustinian Sisters of Our Lady of Consolation (ASOLC) in the City of Iriga in Camarines Sur Province, Philippines. It was founded in 1949 and is one of the 24 Schools in the Philippines administered by the Augustinian Sisters of Our Lady of Consolation. The Patroness of the School is the Blessed Virgin Mary under the title Our Lady of Consolation whose feast is September 4. It is the only catholic institution of learning in Iriga City. Colloquially known as LaCo, LCC-Iriga maintains a lofty position among other schools in the city. It is a member of the Philippine Accrediting Association of Schools, Colleges and Universities(PAASCU).

== History and Development of LCCI ==
La Consolacion College was formerly named La Consolacion Academy on its foundation in 1949 as a response by the Sisters of the Order of St. Augustine (OSA) to the invitation of Msgr. Pedro Santos, the Archbishop of Caceres to establish a catholic school in Iriga. The school's beginnings could be attributed to the efforts made by Fr. Mariano Surtida, the Parish Priest of Iriga, his coadjutor Msgr. Leon Hugo and Sor Concepcion Militar OSA and Sor Lourdes respectively.

Classes began in June 1949. It had its first elementary graduates in 1950 and its first high school graduates in 1954. The high school became co-educational in 1970.

The Catholic Schools-System Development (CS-SD) Program adopted in 1981 paved the way for the decentralization of authority with lay administrators appointed to varied positions in school. A massive Physical Plant Development Program was begun in 1983 and was completed in 2001.

The school finally entered the PAASCU Accreditation Movement in 1987 and had its Grade School initially accredited in 1991 and its high school in 1992 respectively. Since then these departments have submitted to the re-accreditation cycle. To date it had its Third Re-Survey in 2007 and its accreditation status extends until its next re-survey in 2012.

In response to the absence of a private Catholic higher education institution in the city and in Rinconada, the school opened its tertiary department in 1992 hence the change in the school's name from La Consolacion Academy to La Consolacion College. It produced the first batch of college graduates in 1995. To date the college department has sustained its four-year degree programs in Teacher-Education, a ladderized Computer Science Program, a ladderized Tourism Management Course and the associate and short-term courses in Hotel and Restaurant Management.

La Consolacion College celebrated its Golden Jubilee (50 years) in 1999. With its thrust of–Option for the poor the school maintains to date the Free High School, the Free Summer Nursery Class and the adopted barangays for its outreach program.

The school has further enhanced its facilities in keeping with modern technology and the call for a sustained quality Christian education. It has ventured into hosting regional and national assemblies and has produced leaders in varied fields among its graduates.

Recently, the school's program on Hotel and Restaurant Management had been conferred with full government recognition by the Commission on Higher Education making it a four-year baccalaureate course.

== The School Seal ==
The Burning Heart is symbolic of the burning love for God manifested in our search for truth and love of neighbor in service to the poor and needy. The staff, miter, and book speaks well of St. Augustine's life of searching and faithfulness to God's word. The seal is a constant reminder of our commitment to follow Christ closely in our love for God and neighbor through authentic living in UNITY, CHARITY and TRUTH.

== Member Organizations ==
- Philippine Accrediting Association of Schools, Colleges and Universities
- Catholic Educational Association of the Philippines (CEAP)
- Catholic Education Association of Caceres and Libmanan (CEACAL)
- Bicol Association of Catholic Schools (BACS)
- Association of Schools of the Augustinian Sisters (ASAS)

== Notable alumni ==
- Leila de Lima – politician

== See also ==
- La Consolacion College - Bacolod, Negros Occidental
- La Consolacion College – Biñan, Laguna
- La Consolacion College - Daet, Camarines Norte
- La Consolacion College – Manila, Metro Manila
- La Consolacion College – Novaliches - Caloocan, Metro Manila
- La Consolacion University Philippines, Malolos, Bulacan

== Sources ==
- http://www.lcci.edu.ph/
- http://www.chr.gov.ph/MAIN%20PAGES/about%20us/member%20profile/LMDL_profile.htm
- Article title
- http://www.lccm.edu.ph/
- http://www.paascu.org.ph/
- http://www.ceap.org.ph/
