= La Consolacion College Manila =

Roman Catholic college in Manila, Philippines

- Dalubhasaang La Consolacion sa Manila (Filipino)
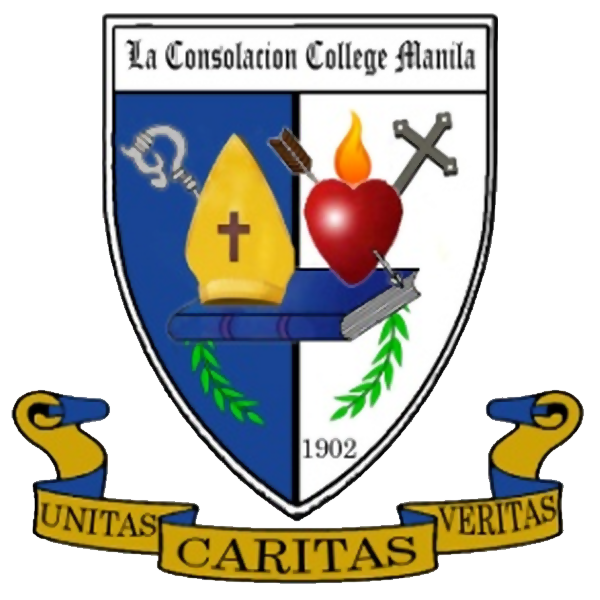
- Former name: Colegio de Nuestra Señora de la Consolacion (1902–1945)
- Motto: Unitas, Caritas, Veritas (Latin)
- Motto in English: Unity Charity Truth
- Type: Private; Non-profit; Basic and Higher education institution
- Established: May 1902; 124 years ago
- Founder: Augustinian Sisters of Our Lady of Consolation
- Religious affiliation: Roman Catholic (Augustinian Sisters)
- Academic affiliations: PAASCU
- President: Sr. Emilia S. Lacuarta, O.S.A.
- Students: 3,000
- Location: 8 Mendiola St., San Miguel, Manila, Philippines; 14°35′50″N 120°59′34″E
- Colors: Blue and White
- Nickname: Blue Royals
- Sporting affiliations: ISAA
- Website: www.lccm.edu.ph
- Location in Manila Location in Metro Manila Location in Luzon Location in the Philippines

La Consolación College Manila is a private Catholic basic and higher education institution run by the Augustinian Sisters of Our Lady of Consolation (ASOLC) in the City of Manila, Philippines. It was founded by the Augustinian Sisters in 1902 when the Apostolic Nuncio to the Philippines offered ten Filipino nuns from the Augustinian Sisters of Our Lady of Consolation a house near the Basilica of San Sebastián.

The college is located beside the Centro Escolar University and across College of the Holy Spirit in the city's San Miguel district, where also Malacañang Palace is located.

== Campus ==
La Consolacion College Manila is in Mendiola Street, at the doorstep of Malacañang Palace, and occupying a trapezoidal area of 2.8 hectares enclosed by the streets of Arlegui, San Rafael, C.A. Aguila and Mendiola. Within the vicinity there are other colleges and universities forming the "university belt" of Claro M. Recto Avenue and Legarda Street.

With the completion of the Line 2 with stations at Recto and Legarda, La Consolacion College Manila is only minutes away from areas up north like Pasig, Marikina, and Quezon City. From the south, buses, fxs, and jeepneys find their route to the heart of Mendiola making the college accessible from any part of the metro.

It is one of the Catholic schools administered by the Augustinian Sisters of Our Lady of Consolation (ASOLC). Aside from the Administration building, Mo. Consuelo Barcelo Auditorium, Gregor Mendel Science Center, and classroom buildings — St. Augustine, Sta. Monica, Our Lady of Consolation, Kamalayan (which houses the college library), and the Mother Rita Building (also known as LCCM International Center) — La Residencia 1 and 2 (dormitories), occupy the land area. Today, there are more than 3,500 students, faculty, and staff.

== History ==
La Consolacion College Manila was founded in 1902 when Msgr. Placido Chapelle, the Papal Nuncio, offered the first ten Filipino Augustinian Sisters a house at R. Hidalgo St., Quiapo near the Basilica of San Sebastian. Chapelle convinced the sisters, Agustinas Terciarias, to cease the operation of their asilo-colegio and to establish a defined school for women whose objective was to provide training and instruction to those intending to pass the civil service examination. The school was named Colegio de Nuestra Señora de la Consolacion. Sor Clara del Santissimo Sacramento was the first directress of the colegio.

The Filipino Augustinian Sisters who founded the school were the same group given the order to disband by the Father Provincial of the Augustinian Order in 1899 during the Philippine–American War when the remaining Catalan Sisters, Sor Rita Barcelo y Pages and Sor Consuelo Barcelo y Pages, left for Spain. The Catalan Sisters were founding sisters of the asilo-colegio in Mandaluyong when they arrived in the country in 1883.

After years of steady growth, the school caught fire in 1909 and was destroyed. In 1910, a new building rose in its present location. It was during this period that the school received the American government's recognition and a permit to include secondary course. As the first among private schools recognized in Manila, G.A. O'Reilly, superintendent of private schools, described it as "most proficient". During its 25th year, in 1927, the school started the expansion of its physical facilities. In 1937 the Junior Normal was opened.

During the Second World War, Japanese soldiers occupied the school. Right after the war in 1945, the school played host to the offices of the Catholic Welfare Organization (CWO) and the Catholic Educational Association of the Philippines (CEAP). It also started conducting "abridged classes". A commencement exercise was held in November for the graduates of 1944-45 before the Junior Normal was reopened on December of the same year. 1945 was marked with two developments: It was the year when the school started accepting boys in the elementary level, and the school adopted La Consolacion College as its official name.

The post-war period was characterized by physical and curricular expansion of the school. In 1947, the Junior Normal had its first set of graduates. The Music Department was recognized to confer diplomas and issue certificates in 1948. By 1951, the Secretarial Department and the combined Junior Normal and Home Economics were added. In 1952, the Office of the College Dean was established paving the way for bachelor's degrees. BSEd was offered in 1962 followed by BS in Commerce as well as other courses.

In 1974, the school's board of trustees was instituted. When the school turned 75, the Mother Rita Barcelo Pastoral Formation Center (MRBPFC) was established as a non-formal educational unit geared towards community assistance. Two years after, in 1979, the school adopted the Catholic Schools' System Development (CSSD) while at the same time working on the Philippine Accrediting Association of Schools, Colleges and Universities (PAASCU) accreditation, which was eventually passed in 1981. The following year, Basic Education Scheme was also adopted. Computer Program was introduced to the college and Basic Education Department in 1985 and 1988, respectively.

The 1990s opened the doors of LCCM to foreign academic and professional linkages. On the eve of its centennial, the school opened a dormitory, La Residencia, and the Kamalayan building which houses the college library, the multimedia, business and case rooms, SMART rooms, the school canteen, the offices of the Center for Technology and Curriculum Development (CTCD) and the School of Information Technology & Computer Studies.

The school officially adopted La Consolacion College Manila as its name. In 2004, LCCM inaugurated the Gregor Mendel Science Center where the Research Center, Nursing Review Center, nursing and science laboratories, e-learning laboratories, etc., are to be found. Today, La Consolacion College Manila is composed of its College Department with its six schools — Business and Accountancy, Arts and Sciences, Nursing, HRM and Tourism, Information Technology & Computer Studies, and Music — and the Basic Education Department.

== Gallery ==
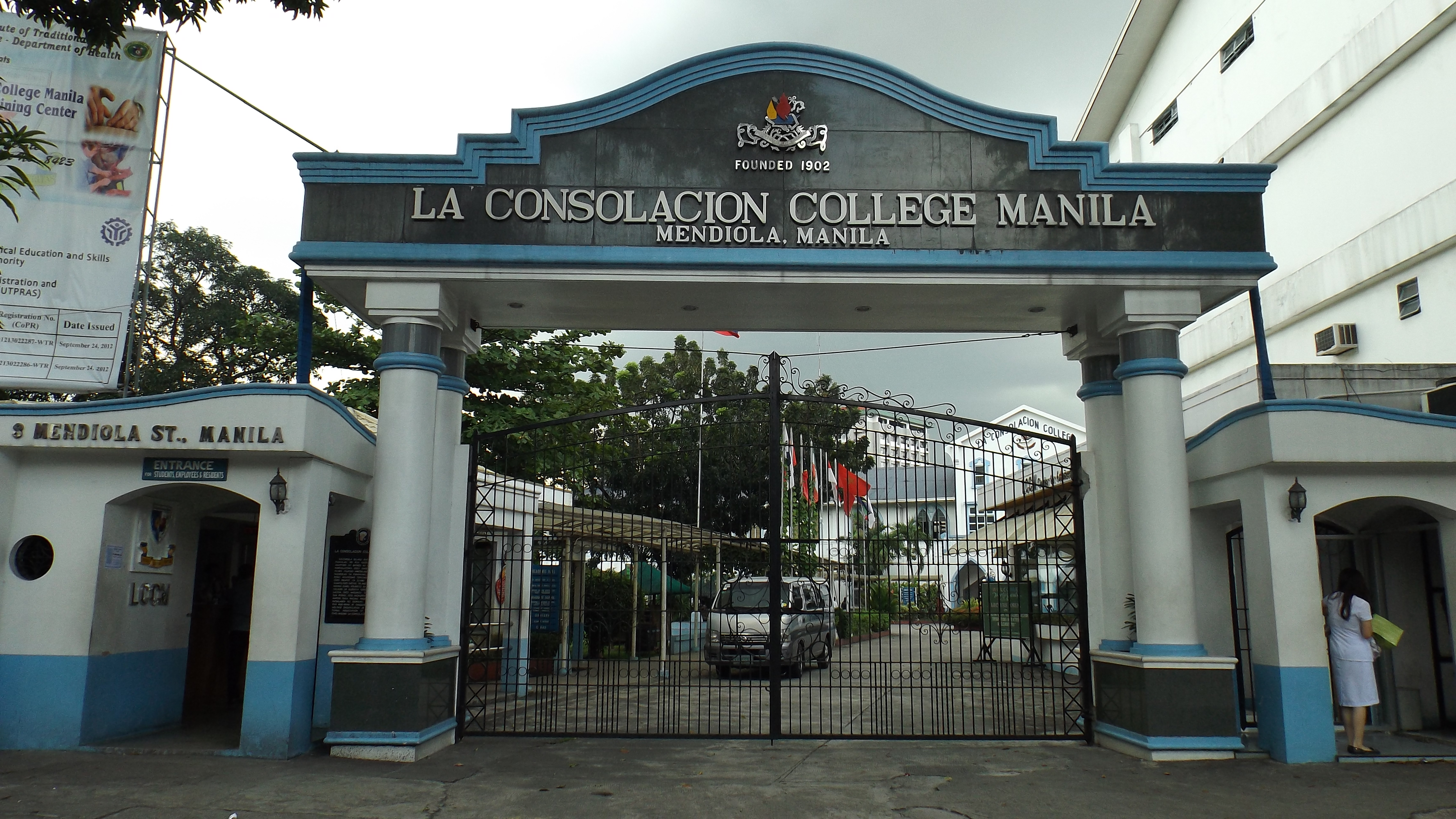
Main entrance

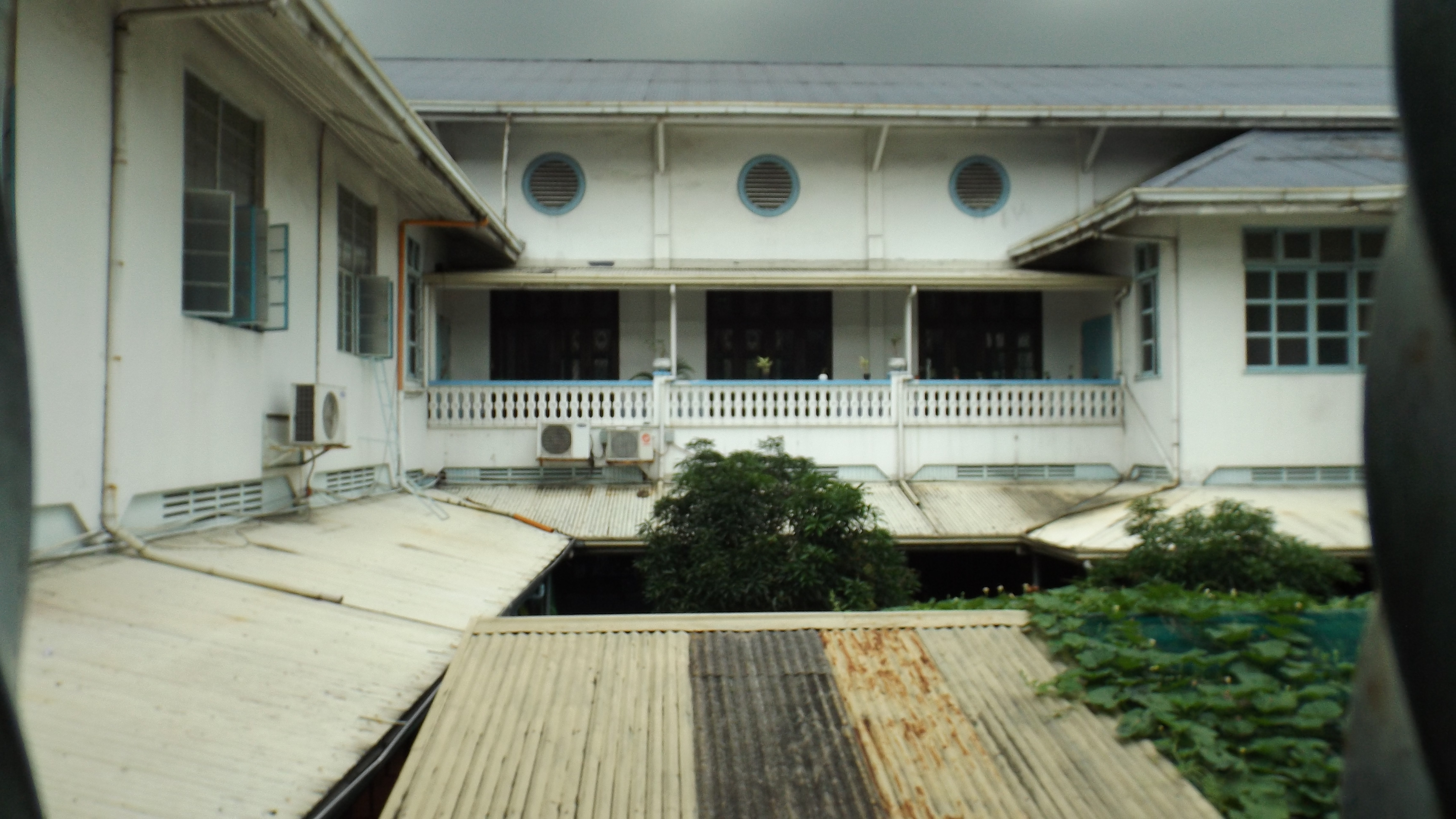
Exterior of the main building

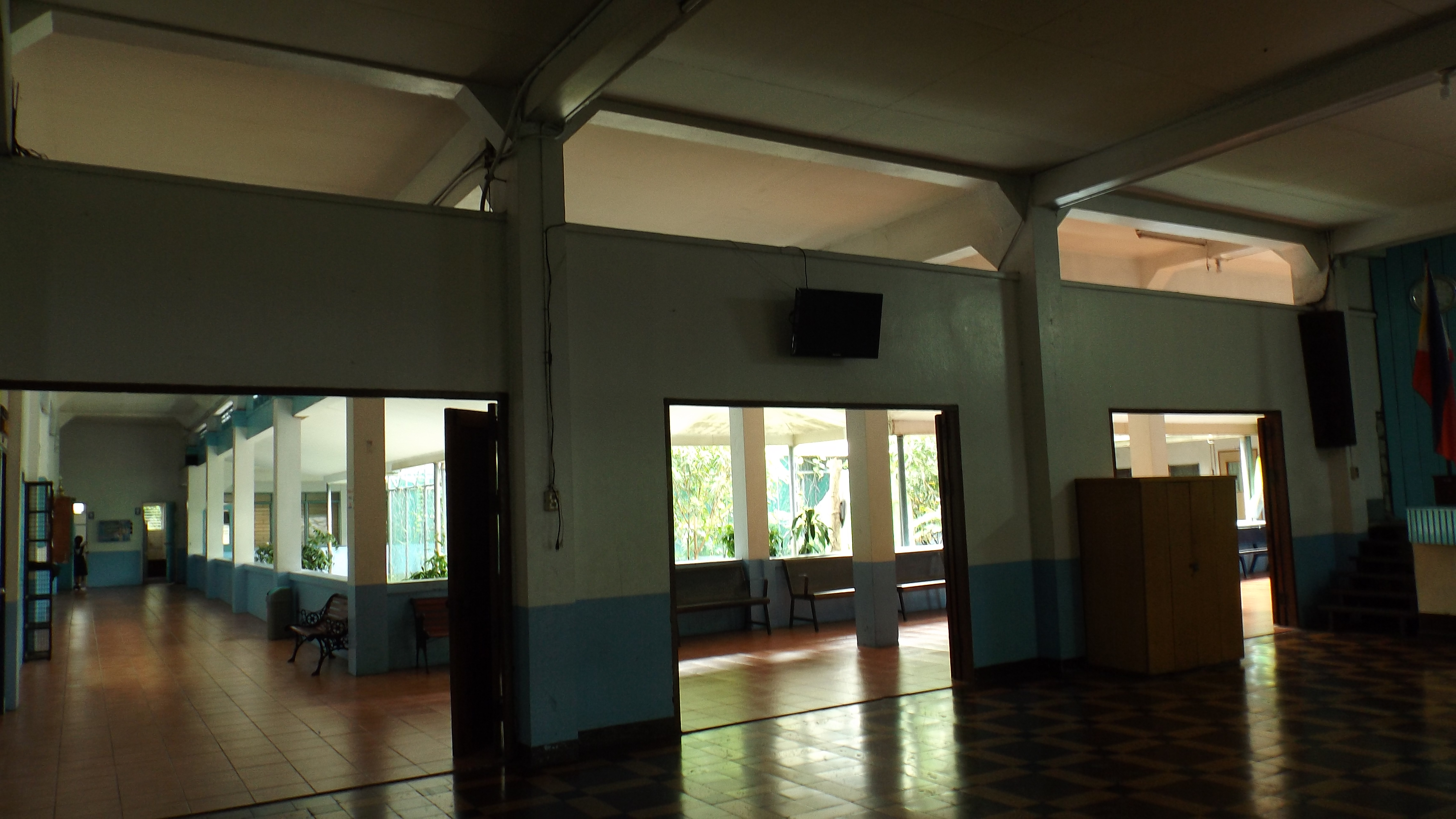
Corridor within the main building

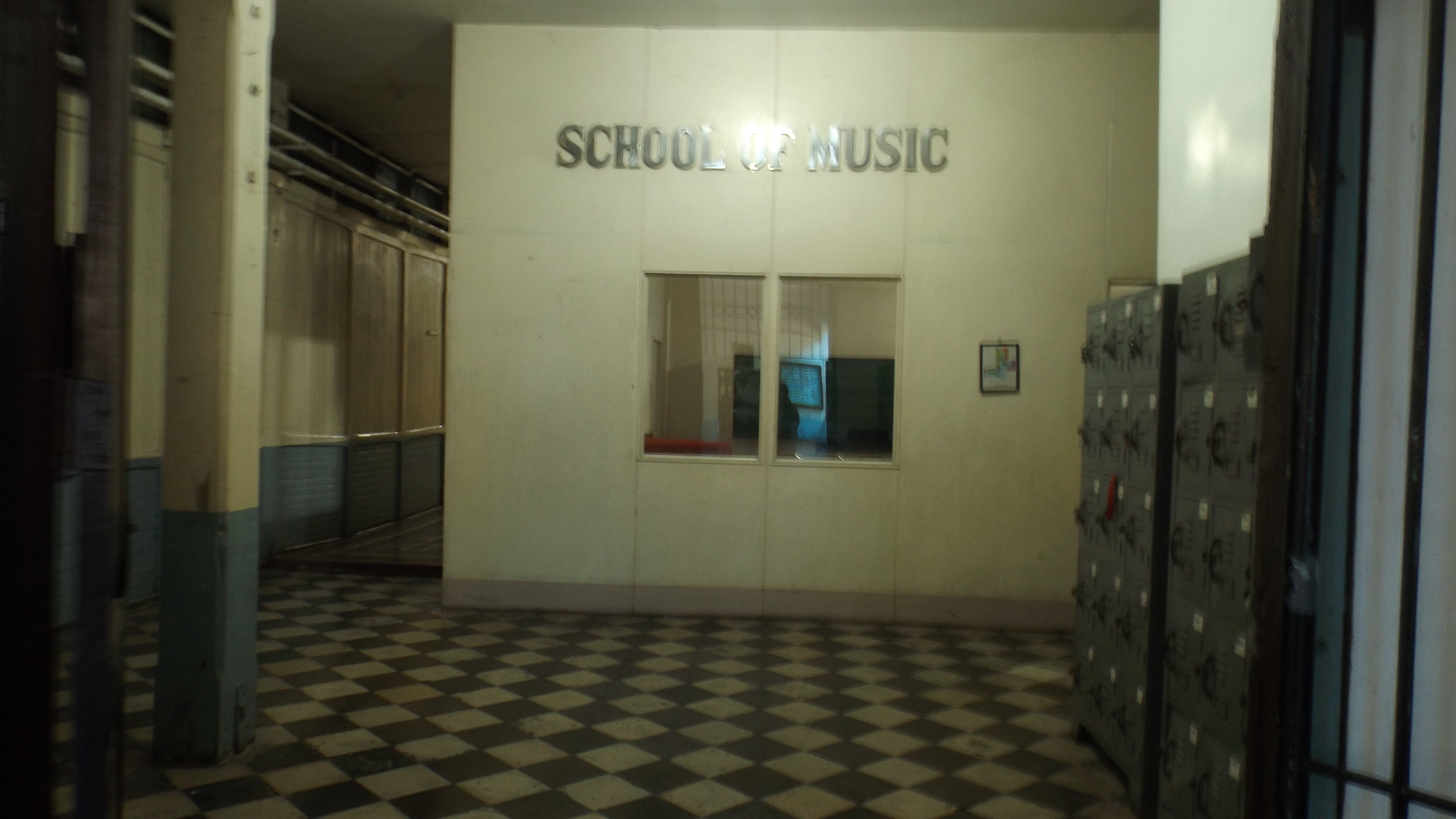
School of Music

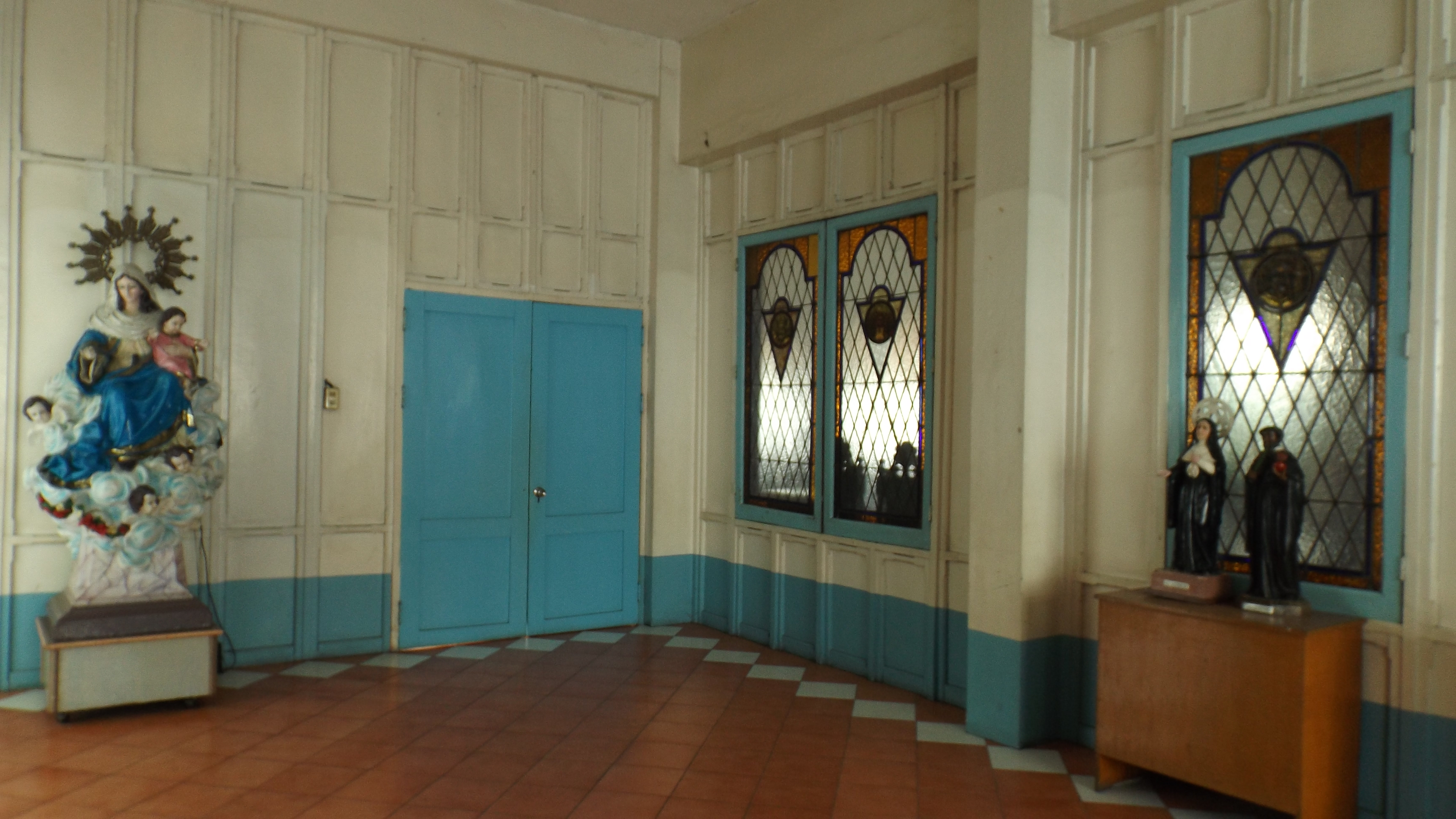
Exterior of the chapel, second floor of the main building

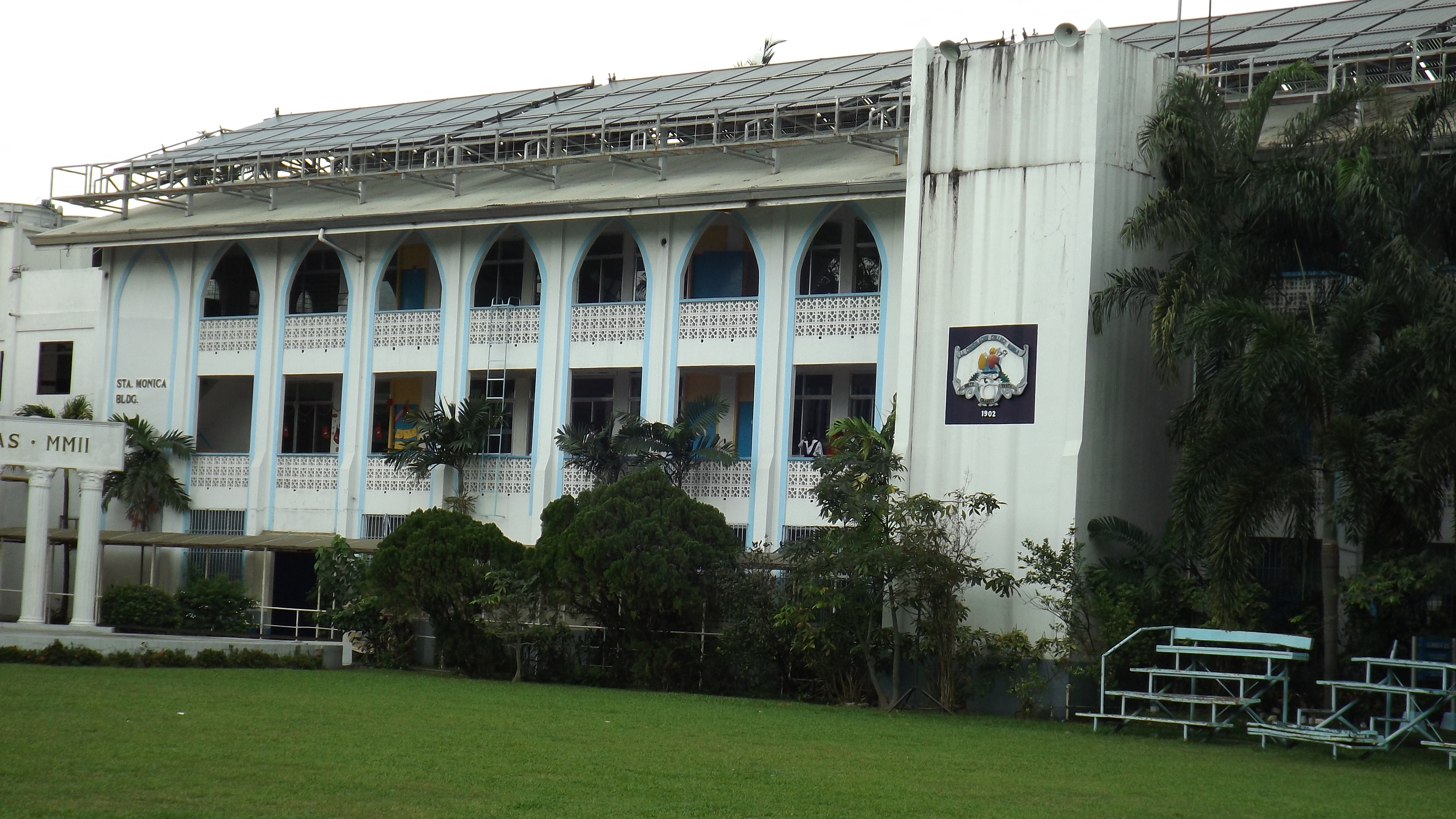
Santa Monica building

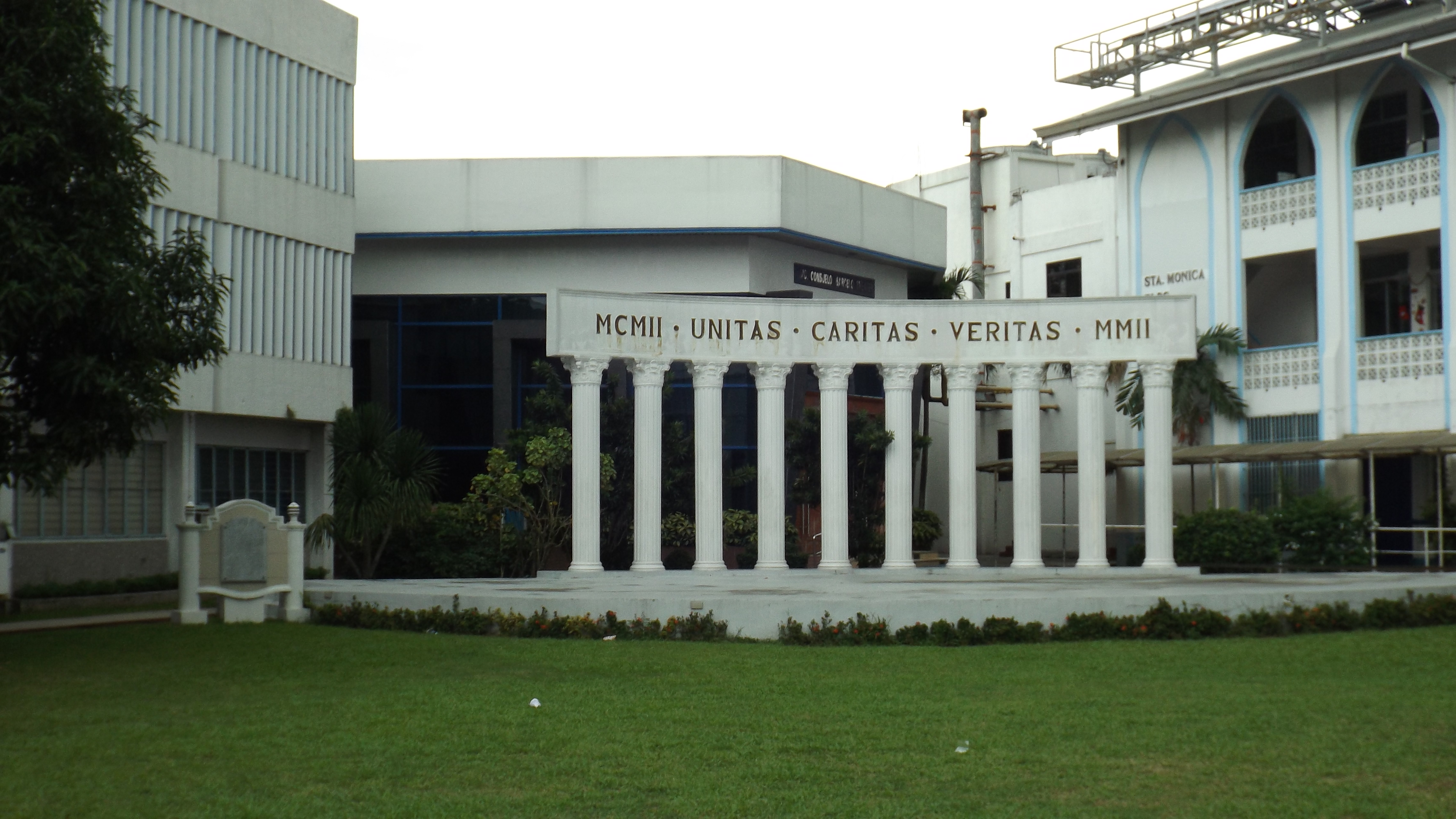
Centennial Anniversary 1902-2002

== See also ==
- La Consolacion College - Bacolod, Negros Occidental
- La Consolacion College – Biñan, Laguna
- La Consolacion College - Daet, Camarines Norte
- La Consolacion College - Iriga, Camarines Sur
- La Consolacion College – Novaliches - Caloocan, Metro Manila
- La Consolacion University Philippines, Malolos, Bulacan
