= Sisters of St Rita =

The Sisters of Saint Rita are a Roman Catholic religious institute. They were founded in 1911 by Father Hugolinus Dach, an Augustinian priest in Würzburg, Germany.

Originally developed as a lay group to care for families, in 1917 the Sisters took the habit, and started to say the daily Marian office. There were seven sisters at peak and currently there are three.

In 1936, they were aggregated to the Order of Saint Augustine and given the Rule of St. Augustine. In 1935, four sisters had been sent as missioners to Bolivia. When their mission was completed, they could not return home due to the imminent outbreak of World War II. They went instead to work at the Augustinians' Our Lady of Good Counsel Novitiate in New Hamburg, New York.

In 1942, they were invited to come work for the priests at St. Rita's Parish in Racine, Wisconsin. In 1971, the sisters opened St. Monica's Senior Citizen Home.
