= Lakewood Cultural Center =

Coordinates: 39°42′30″N 105°5′6″W

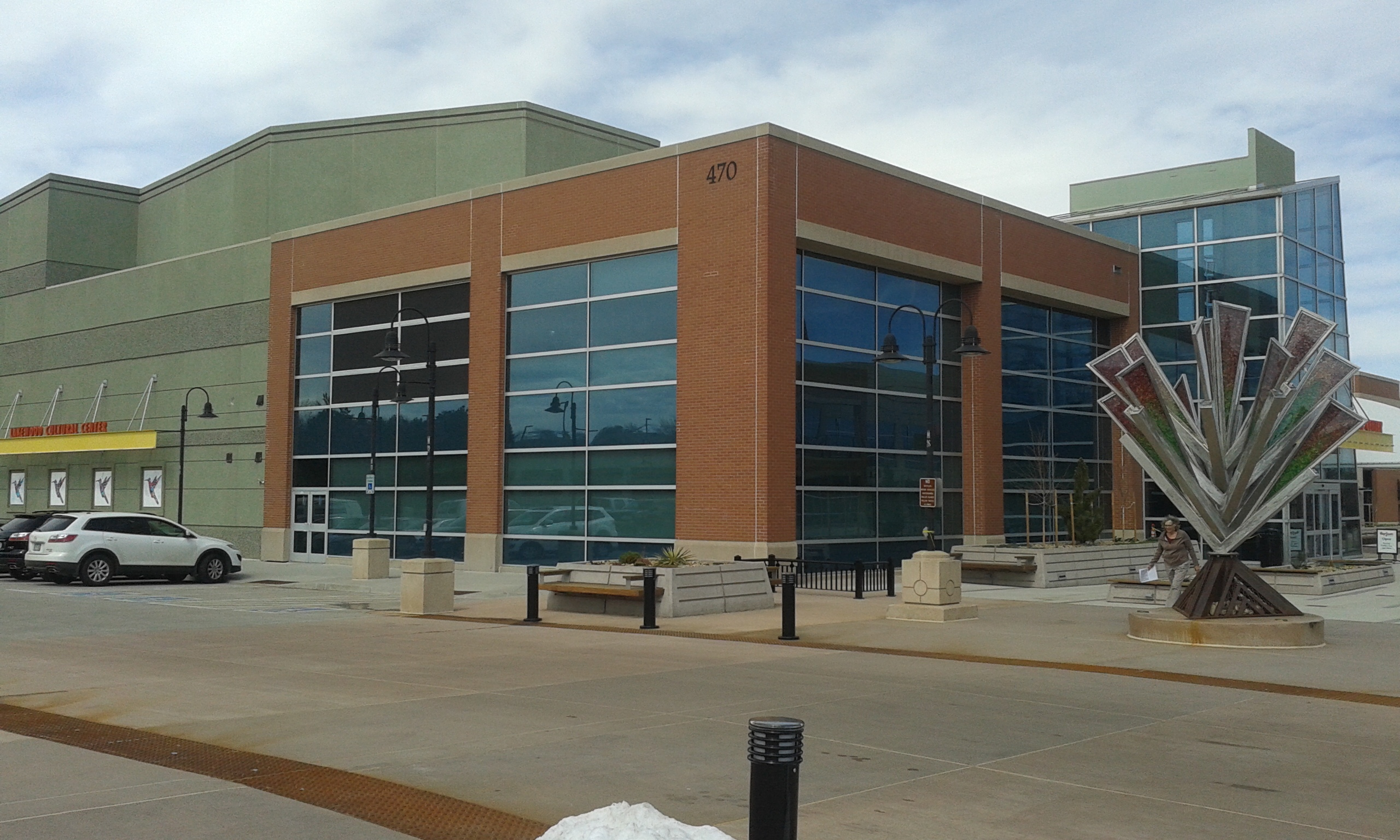
Lakewood Cultural Center from adjacent parking garage

The Lakewood Cultural Center is a regional theatre and arts venue located in Lakewood, Colorado.

The space is 38,000 square feet (3,500 m^{2}) and opened in Fall 2000. It includes a 320-seat auditorium, community room, gallery/exhibit space, classrooms and lobby space. It is designed for art and cultural programming and general community use.

The Cultural Center offers special engagements, nationally & internationally recognized artists presented by the City of Lakewood to perform or exhibit at the Cultural Center, and community presentations, performances or exhibits featuring work by local artists, schools and performing arts organizations.
