= Agostina Camozzi =

Italian Roman Catholic nun

Blessed Agostina Camozzi (Cristina da Spoleto) O.S.A.
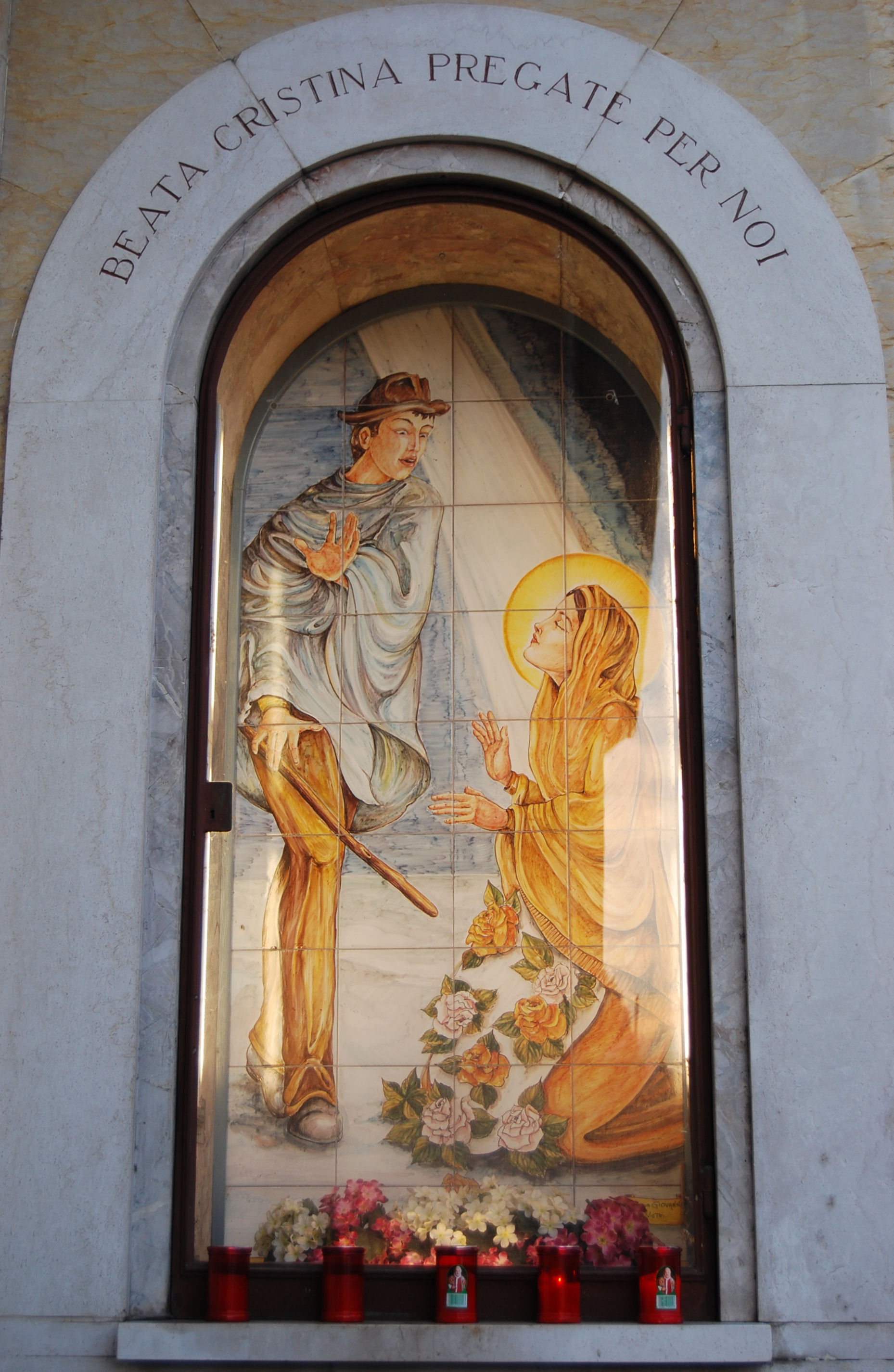

Religious
- Born: 1435; Como, Duchy of Milan
- Died: 13 February 1458 (aged 23); Spoleto, Papal States
- Venerated in: Roman Catholic Church
- Beatified: 19 September 1834, Saint Peter's Basilica, Papal States by Pope Gregory XVI
- Feast: 13 February
- Attributes: Augustinian habit
- Patronage: Calvisano (since 1512)

Agostina Camozzi (1435 - 13 February 1458) - in religious Cristina - was an Italian Roman Catholic professed religious from the Order of Saint Augustine. Camozzi led a dissolute life as a widow and a soldier's mistress before she became a nun and adopted a life of total repentance.

Her beatification received confirmation from Pope Gregory XVI on 19 September 1834 after the pontiff acknowledged the late nun's 'cultus' (or longstanding and popular devotion).

== Life ==
Agostina Camozzi was born in 1435 in Como to the well-known doctor Giovanni Camozzi.

Camozzi married a stonecutter - despite the protests of her parents - but was widowed not long after their marriage. She soon became the mistress to a Milanese soldier and bore his child - her sole child - though this child died as an infant. She became widowed once more after her second marriage when a jealous rival killed her farmer husband from Mantua competing for her affections. This prompted Camozzi to realize that her life had spun out of control and caused her to experience a religious conversion circa 1450; she henceforth decided to enter the religious life and became a member of the Order of Saint Augustine where she assumed the religious name of "Cristina". She moved to Verona around this time.

Her time in the order became noted for the severe austerities that she imposed upon herself as penance for her earlier life and she lived in a number of convents where she became known as a miracle worker until settling in Spoleto. She clothed herself in a habit that was made from sown-together rags and meditated deep on the passion of Jesus Christ.

Camozzi travelled on a pilgrimage to both Assisi and Rome as well as international to Jerusalem in 1457 during the Lenten season but on the return trip died in Spoleto in 1458 due to fever. She received a vision of the Blessed Mother before her death. Her remains were interred at the order's church of Saint Nicholas but re-interred at the Chiesa di San Gregorio Magno in 1921 until 2015 when the remains were moved back to her hometown.

In 1999 her remains were examined and the report suggested that she was obese and was 1.45 meters. The report was allowed at the invitation of Monsignor Giampiero Ceccarelli and the Bishop of Spoleto Riccardo Fontana. The examination reported all her teeth were present and the thorax was well preserved while there was the total absence of all internal organs.

== Beatification ==
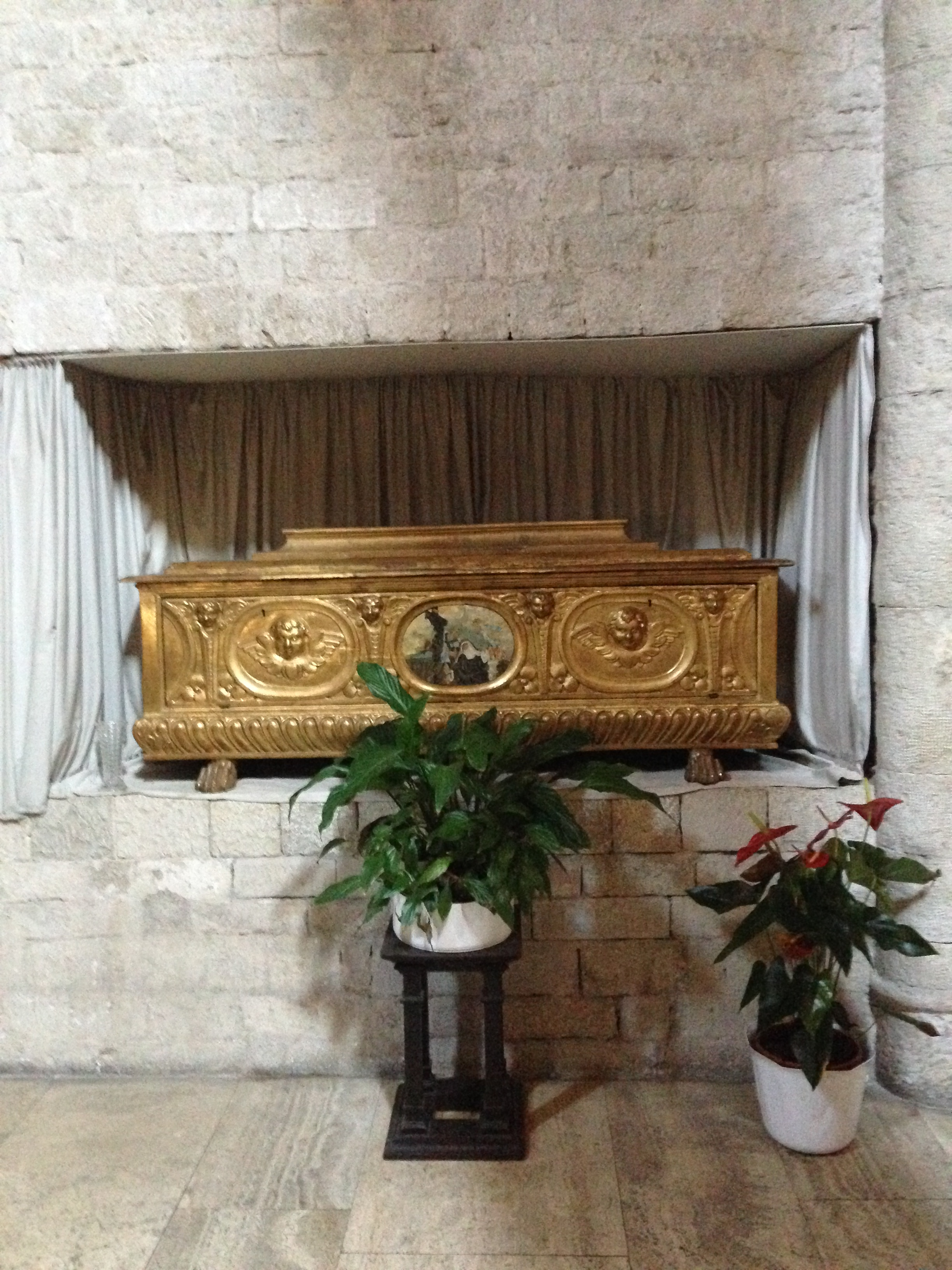
Tomb.

The confirmation of the late nun's 'cultus' (or popular devotion) on 19 September 1834 allowed for Pope Gregory XVI to approve the nun's beatification. In 1521 she was chosen as the patron of Calvisano.
