= LCS =

LCS may refer to:

== Schools and organizations ==
- Laboratory for Computer Science, research institute at the Massachusetts Institute of Technology
- Lake County Schools school district of Lake County, Florida
- Lakefield College School an independent school in Lakefield, Ontario, Canada
- Larchmont Charter School, a public charter school in Los Angeles, California
- Lebanese Community School in Lagos, Nigeria
- Legal Complaints Service, a former body that formally investigated complaints about solicitors in the United Kingdom
- Lincoln Christian College and Seminary
- Lincoln Community School in Accra, Ghana
- Littlehampton Community School, large secondary school in West Sussex, England
- Littleover Community School in Derby, England
- Lockerby Composite School Canadian Secondary School in Ontario
- London Controlling Section, a British World War II secret organisation
- London Co-operative Society, a former consumer co-operative society of the United Kingdom
- London Corresponding Society, a radical British society founded in 1792
- Louisville Collegiate School, a private, nonsectarian, college preparatory k-12 school in Louisville, Kentucky.
- Lutheran Confessional Synod, type of church
- Lynchburg City Schools
- Lynden Christian Schools

== Science, mathematics, and computing ==
- Laser Camera System, a type of scanner used on the Space Shuttle
- Lagrangian coherent structure, in fluid mechanics, a type of flow structure
- Learning classifier system, machine learning system
- Lincoln Calibration Sphere 1, first of a series of inert globes used as radar calibration satellites
- Liquid cooling system
- Locally convex space
- Longest common substring problem in computer science, the longest shared sequence of consecutive characters
- Longest common subsequence problem in computer science, the longest shared sequence of not necessarily consecutive characters
- Live Communications Server, Microsoft product now known as Skype for Business Server

== Sports and entertainment ==
- Grand Theft Auto: Liberty City Stories, a game for the PlayStation Portable and PlayStation 2
- Last Comic Standing, an NBC reality program that premiered in 2003
- League Championship Series, the semi-finals round of playoffs in Major League Baseball
- League Championship Series (formerly League of Legends Championship Series), a former North American professional esports league for the video game League of Legends
- Lion City Sailors, a Singaporean football club
- Loose Cannon Studios, an American video game company

== Other uses ==
- Littoral combat ship, two modern classes of US Navy ships
- Landing Craft Support, classes of ships in US Navy and Royal Navy
- Licensed Clinical Social Worker, a credential in psychology, see List of credentials in psychology
- Low Country Sound, an American record label imprint

== See also ==
- LC (disambiguation)
