= List of launch complexes =

This is a list of launch complexes where a Launch complex is a facility from which different types of launch vehicles are launched. It may contain one or more launch pads or suitable sites to mount a transportable launch pad.

- Ariane Launch Complex (1970—)
- Baikonur Cosmodrome Launch Complex 1 (1957—)
- Cape Canaveral Air Force Station Launch Complex 1 (1955—1960), used during development of the SM-62 Snark Intercontinental Cruise Missile
- Cape Canaveral Air Force Station Launch Complex 34 (1961—1968), used by the Apollo program
- Cape Canaveral Launch Complex 36 (1962—2005), leased by Blue Origin since 2015 and under reconstruction as a New Glenn launch site
- Green River Launch Complex (1964—1975) in Utah for Athena/ABRES testing of reentry vehicles to White Sands
- Kennedy Space Center Launch Complex 39
  - 39A (1967—), leased by SpaceX since 2014 and modified to support its launch vehicles
  - 39B (1969—), now reconfigured for NASA's Space Launch System and Artemis program
  - 39C (2015—), dedicated to small-lift launch vehicles
- Osaki Launch Complex (1975—1992)
- Pacific Spaceport Complex – Alaska (1998—)
- Point Arguello Launch Complex A (1959—1966) and B (1960—1963) launch facilities for sounding rockets
- Satish Dhawan Space Centre (1979—)
- Snark Missile Launch Complex (1959—1961) at the Presque Isle Air Force Base, the SM-62 Snark's only operational launch complex
- Soyuz Launch Complex (2011—2022) at the French Guiana Space Centre, inactive due to Russo-Ukrainian War
- Taiyuan Launch Complex 1 (1988—2009) for Long March rockets
- Tanegashima Space Center (1969–)
- Titan II ICBM Launch Complex 374-7
- Vandenberg AFB Probe Launch Complex C (1971—1975), sounding rockets launch facility
- Vandenberg AFB Space Launch Complex 3 (1960—) Atlas V launch site for high-inclination orbits such as polar or Sun-synchronous ones
- White Sands Launch Complex 33 (1971—1975), a post-World War II launching site for V-2 rockets listed on the US National Register of Historic Places
- White Sands Launch Complex 36 (1958—2008), the Cold War site for Black Brant IX and 9CM1 launches, later used for NASA's sounding rockets program
- White Sands Launch Complex 37 (1964—1992), the Cold War site for Nike Hercules rockets
- White Sands Launch Complex 38 (1960-1963), the Cold War site for Nike Zeus testing
- Yoshinobu Launch Complex (1994—)
- Xichang Launch Complex 2 (1990—)

== See also ==
- List of rocket launch sites
- Launch pad
- Space landing complex
- LC (disambiguation)
- Launch (disambiguation)
- Complex (disambiguation)
