= Augustinian nuns =

Branch of the Augustinian order for women

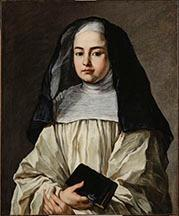
Oil painting of an Augustinian nun by Pier Leone Ghezzi

Augustinian nuns are the most ancient and continuous segment of the Augustinian religious order. Named after Augustine of Hippo, there are several Catholic religious communities of women living according to a guide to religious life known as the Rule of St. Augustine. Prominent Augustinian nuns include the canonized Italian mystics Clare of Montefalco and Rita of Cascia.

== History ==
Though Augustine of Hippo probably didn't compose a formal monastic rule (despite the extant Augustinian Rule), his hortatory letter to the nuns at Hippo Regius (Epist., ccxi, Benedictine ed.) is the most ancient example on which the beginnings of this Augustinian Rule are based.

The nuns regard as their first foundation the monastery for which St. Augustine wrote the rules of life in his Epistola ccxi (alias cix) in 423. It is certain that this epistle was called the Rule of St. Augustine for nuns at an early date, and has been followed as the rule of life in many female monasteries since the 11th century. These monasteries were not consolidated in 1256, like the religious communities of Augustinian monks.

Each convent was independent and was not subject to the general of the order. This led to differences in rule, dress, and mode of life. Only since the 15th century have certain Augustinian Hermits reformed a number of Augustinian nunneries, become their spiritual directors, and induced them to adopt the Constitution of their order. Henceforth, there were female members of the Order of Hermits of St. Augustine in Italy, France, Spain, Belgium and later in Germany, where, however, many were suppressed during the Reformation, or by the secularizing law of 1803. In the other countries many nunneries were closed in consequence of the French Revolution. The still existing houses in the early 20th century, except Cascia, Renteria (Diocese of Vitoria), Eibar (Diocese of Vittoria) and Cracow, were under the jurisdiction of the bishop of the diocese. Many convents are celebrated for the saints whom they produced, such as Montefalco in Central Italy, the home of St. Clare of the Cross (or St. Clara of Montefalco, d. 1308), and Cascia, near Perugia, where St. Rita died in 1457. In the suppressed German convent of Agnetenberg near Dülmen, in Westphalia, lived Anne Catherine Emmerich. A number of Discalced Augustinian nuns in Valencia were martyred in the Spanish Civil War.

== Foundations ==
The monastery of the so-called Augustinians delle Vergini ("Augustinians of the Virgin"), at Venice, was founded in 1177 by pope Alexander III after his reconciliation with Holy Roman Emperor Frederick Barbarossa, whose daughter Julia, with twelve girls of noble birth, entered the monastery and became first abbess. On the French occupation in the 18th century the religious went to America, where they devoted themselves to the work of teaching and the care of the sick.

Lacock Abbey in the village of Lacock, Wiltshire, England, was founded in the early 13th century by Ela, Countess of Salisbury, as a nunnery of the Augustinian order. It remained so until the suppression of the monasteries in the 16th century;

Grace Dieu Priory was an independent Augustinian priory near Thringstone in Leicestershire, England. It was founded around 1235-1241 by Roesia de Verdun. It was dedicated to the Holy Trinity and St. Mary. The priory was fairly large, having in 1337 sixteen nuns, who called themselves "the White Nuns of St. Augustine". It also had an attached hospital which cared for twelve poor people. The priory was dissolved in October 1538.

Towards the end of the 16th century communities of female Discalced Augustinians appeared in Spain. In the convent at Cybar, Mariana Manzanedo of St. Joseph instituted a reform which led to the establishment of a third, that of the female Order of Augustinian Recollects.

Historically, the most important of the observant Augustinian congregations were the Spanish Augustinian tertiary nuns, founded in 1545 by Archbishop Thomas of Villanova at Valencia; the "reformed" Augustinian nuns who originated under the influence of Augustinian educated Carmelite Teresa of Ávila after the end of the 16th century at Madrid, Alcoy, and those founded in Portugal.

== The Augustinian ethos ==
The teaching and writing of Augustine, the Augustinian Rule, and the lives and experiences of Augustinians over sixteen centuries help define the ethos of the order.

The pursuit of truth through learning is key to the Augustinian ethos, balanced by the injunction to behave with love towards one another. These same imperatives of affection and fairness have driven the order in its international missionary outreach. This balanced pursuit of love and learning has energized the various branches of the order into building communities founded on mutual affection and intellectual advancement.

Augustine spoke passionately of God's "beauty so ancient and so new", and his fascination with beauty extended to music. He taught that "to sing once is to pray twice" (Qui cantat, bis orat), and music is also a key part of the Augustinian ethos. Besides the significant musical contribution of Augustinian nun and composer Vittoria Aleotti, contemporary Augustinian musical foundations include the famous Augustinerkirche of the (male) friars in Vienna, where orchestral masses by Mozart and Schubert are performed every week, as well as the boys' choir at Sankt Florian in Austria, a school conducted by Canons Regular, a choir now over 1,000 years old.

== Augustinian contemplative communities ==
Augustinian contemplative nuns belonging to the monasteries of the Order are members of the Order of Saint Augustine (OSA).

- The Augustinian Community of Santi Quattro Coronati was established in 1564.
- The Augustinian nuns in New Lenox, Illinois are a cloistered, contemplative community.
- Our Lady of Grace Monastery in Nova Scotia is occupied by the Contemplative Augustinian Nuns.
- The Monastery of the Mother of Good Counsel at Bulacan, Philippines was established in 1998.

Around 1,500 women live in Augustinian enclosed convents in the Netherlands, Spain, Switzerland, Malta, Mexico, Panama, Peru, Bolivia, Chile, Ecuador, and Kenya.

Other orders and communities of women that are not enclosed and belong within the Augustinian family. Some have been formally aggregated to the order by the prior general:

- The congregation of the Augustinian Sisters of Our Lady of Consolation (ASOLC) was founded in 1883. An institute primarily dedicated to education, it was aggregated to the Order of Saint Augustine (OSA) in May 1902. They founded the La Consolacion College Manila.
- The Sisters of St Rita, were aggregated to the Order of Saint Augustine in 1936;

All congregations of Augustinian sisters are not, however affiliated to the Order of St. Augustine. Others follow the Rule of Augustine and remain independent congregations. The Augustinian Sisters of Mercy of Jesus (South Africa), the Augustinian Recollects and the Sisters of Our Lady of Consolation (both in the Philippines), the Congregation of Our Lady of the Missions, the Sisters of Charity of the Incarnate Word (who established the University of the Incarnate Word in Texas), and the Sisters of St Joan of Arc (in Quebec, United States, and Rome) are just some of the Augustinian family of orders who are not enclosed women. The Sisters of Life are a relatively new order (founded 1991 by Cardinal O'Connor) who follow the Augustinian rule. The Bridgettines follow the Rule of St. Augustine.

There are other Augustinian nuns in the Anglican Communion.

== Saints and Blesseds ==
Saints

- Chiara (della Croce) da Montefalco (c. 1268 – 18 August 1308), abbess and mystic, canonized on 8 December 1881
- Rita of Cascia (c. 1381 – 22 May 1457), nun and mystic, canonized on 24 May 1900

Blesseds

- Cristiana Menabuoi de Santa Croce sull’Arno (c. 1237 - 4 January 1310), professed religious, beatified on 15 June 1776
- Lucia Bufalari de Rieti (c. 1300 - 27 July 1350), professed religious, beatified on 3 August 1832
- Giulia della Rena de Certaldo (c. 1319 – 9 January 1367), professed religious, beatified on 18 May 1819
- Cristina Camozzi di Spoleto (c. 1435 - 13 February 1458), professed religious, beatified on 19 September 1834
- Elena Valentini di Udine (c. 1396 - 23 April 1458), professed religious, beatified on 27 September 1848
- Maddalena Albrici (c. 1390 - 15 May 1465), professed religious, beatified on 11 December 1907
- Caterina Moriggi da Pallanza (c. 1437 - 6 April 1478), professed religious, beatified on 16 September 1769
- Veronica Negroni di Binasco (c. 1445 – 13 January 1497), nun, beatified on 15 December 1517
- Giuliana Puricelli de Busto Arsizio (1427 - 15 August 1501), professed religious, beatified on 16 September 1769
- Cristina Ciccarelli di L’Aquila (24 February 1481 – 18 January 1543), nun, beatified on 15 January 1841
- Maria Teresa Fasce (27 December 1881 - 18 January 1947), nun, beatified on 12 October 1997

Declared Blessed by popular acclaim

- Giovanna di Damiano da Montefalco (died 22 November 1291), sister of Saint Clare of Montefalco and founder of a monastery converted from a prison and became its abbess
- Marsilia Pupelli (died c. 1298), nun
- Marchesina Luzi da Visso (died 10 January 1510), tertiary and martyr

Venerables

- María Juana Guillén Ramírez (27 December 1575 - 2 June 1607), professed religious, declared Venerable on 19 November 1970
- Anna Clara Giovanna Baseggio (Maria Felicita Fortunata) (5 May 1752 - 11 February 1829), professed religious, declared Venerable on 20 February 2021

Servants of God

- Catalina of Saint Thomas of Villanova Maura Pou (4 September 1664 - 18 January 1735), professed religious
- Angela Caterina Borgia (14 June 1694 - 1 February 1743), professed religious
- Cándida Cordova Pozuelo (María Cándida of Saint Augustine) (15 February 1804 - 30 March 1861), professed religious
- Victoriana Sáez Martinez (Agustina of the Consolation) (12 April 1847 - 27 September 1910), professed religious

== Notable Augustinian women ==
- Margaret Haydock (1767?-1845), of the ancient English Catholic Recusant Haydock family
- Vittoria Aleotti, Italian composer

== See also ==
- Augustinians
- Augustinian nuns in the Anglican Communion
- Discalced Augustinians
- Order of Augustinian Recollects
- Canonesses
- Independent Augustinian Communities

== Sources ==
- Bibliography for the Augustinian official website
- Augustine of Hippo, The Rule of St Augustine Constitutiones Ordinis Fratrum S. Augustini (Rome 1968)
- The Augustinians (1244–1994): Our History in Pictures. Pubblicazioni Agostiniane, Via Paolo VI, 25, Roma, Italy.
- Canning O.S.A, Rev. R. (1984). The Rule of St Augustine. Darton, Longman and Todd.
- Orbis Augustinianus sive conventuum O. Erem. S. A. chorographica et topographica descriptio Augustino Lubin, Paris, 1659, 1671, 1672.
- Regle de S. Augustin pour lei religieuses de son .ordre; et Constitutions de la Congregation des Religieuses du Verbe-Incarne et du Saint-Sacrament (Lyon: Chez Pierre Guillimin, 1662), pp. 28–29. Cf. later edition published at Lyon (Chez Briday, Libraire,1962), pp. 22–24. English edition, The Rule of Saint Augustine and the Constitutions of the Order of the Incarnate Word and Blessed Sacrament (New York: Schwartz, Kirwin, and Fauss, 1893), pp. 33–35.
- Zumkeller O.S.A., Adolar (1986). Augustine's ideal of Religious life. Fordham University Press, New York.
- Zumkeller O.S.A., Adolar (1987). Augustine's Rule. Augustinian Press, Villanova, Pennsylvania U.S.A.
