= Lu =

Lu, Lü, or LU may refer to:

== Arts and entertainment ==
- Lu (duo), a Mexican band
  - Lu (album)
- Character from Mike, Lu & Og
- Lebor na hUidre, a manuscript containing many Irish fictional stories commonly abbreviated LU
- Lu (novel), 2018, by Jason Reynolds
- Character from Lu & the Bally Bunch

== Businesses and brands ==
- LU (biscuits), a French biscuit brand
- Lufax or Lu.com, Chinese financial technology company
- LATAM Express (IATA code)
- Lucent Technologies (former NYSE code LU)

== Chinese surnames ==
- Lu (surname), including:
  - Lu (surname 卢), the 52nd commonest
  - Lu (surname 陆), the 61st commonest
  - Lu (surname 鲁), the 115th commonest
  - Lu (surname 路), the 116th commonest
  - Lu (surname 芦), the 140th commonest
  - Lu (surname 禄)
  - Lu (surname 逯)
  - Lu (surname 鹿)
- Lü (surname), 吕, the 47th commonest

== Food ==
- Lū or laulau, Tongan name for leaves of taro
- Lǔ, a Chinese method of red cooking

== Languages ==
- Lü language of South East Asia
- Luba-Katanga language, ISO 639-1 code, spoken in the Democratic Republic of the Congo

== People ==
=== Actors ===
- Lu Corfield (born 1979 or 1980), Welsh actress
- Lu Leonard (1926-2004), American actress

=== Journalists ===
- Lu Parker (born 1968), American journalist

=== In music ===
- Lupe Fiasco or Lu (born 1982), American musician
- Lu Watters (1911-1989), American musician
- Lu Ann Simms (1932-2003), American singer

=== In sport ===
- Lu Gambino (1923-2003), American football player
- Lu Blue (1897-1958), American baseball player

== Places ==
=== Asia ===
- Lu (state) of ancient China, in today's Shandong Province
- Lü (state), an ancient Chinese state
- Lu Commandery, of ancient China
- Lù, a circuit (administrative division) in China
- Lu, Iran, Isfahan Province
- Lu County, Sichuan, China
- La Union, Philippines, from its initials
- Official abbreviation for Shandong province, derived from the state

=== Europe ===
- LU postcode area in England
- Lu, Piedmont, Alessandria, Italy
- Lü, Switzerland, Graubünden
- Province of Lucca, Italy, vehicle registration code
- Canton of Lucerne, Switzerland, ISO 3166 code CH-LU
- Luxembourg, ISO country code
- Lú (county), or County of Louth, Ireland
  - Lú, Irish name for the village of Louth, County Louth

== Universities ==
=== Bangladesh ===
- Leading University, Sylhet

=== Canada ===
- Lakehead University, Thunder Bay, Ontario
- Laurentian University, Sudbury, Ontario

=== Hong Kong ===
- Lingnan University, Tuen Mun, Hong Kong

=== India ===
- University of Lucknow, Uttar Pradesh

=== Latvia ===
- University of Latvia, Riga

=== Lebanon ===
- Lebanese University, Beirut

=== Sweden ===
- Lund University, Scania

=== United States ===
- Lamar University, Beaumont, Texas
- Langston University, Oklahoma
- Lehigh University, Bethlehem, Pennsylvania
- Lindenwood University, St. Charles, Missouri
- Liberty University, Lynchburg, Virginia

== Science, technology, and mathematics ==
- .lu, Luxembourg's Internet domain
- LU decomposition of a matrix in mathematics
- Lutetium, symbol Lu, a chemical element

== Other uses ==
- Livestock Unit of grazing land
- London Underground, UK
- Lú or Lugh, an ancient god in Irish mythology
- Lu people, a southeast Asian ethnic group
- Lu, a hippopotamus at the Homosassa Springs Wildlife State Park

== See also ==
- Lew (disambiguation)
- Lieu (disambiguation)
- Loo (disambiguation)
- Lou (disambiguation)
- Lue (disambiguation)
- Luu (disambiguation)
