= Lu (surname) =

Chinese surnames with the romanization "Lu"

Lu is the pinyin and Wade–Giles romanization of several distinct Chinese surnames that are written with different characters in Chinese. Depending on the character, it may be spelled Lú, Lǔ, or Lù when pinyin tone diacritics are used. Lu 盧 and Lu 陸 are the most common: both are among the 100 most common surnames in China. Languages using the Latin alphabet do not distinguish among the different Chinese surnames, rendering them all as Lu.

== List of surnames romanized as Lu ==
- Lú 卢/盧 (2nd tone), the 52nd most common surname in China. "Lo" in Cantonese. The character also means "black".
- Lù 陆/陸 (4th tone), the 61st most common surname in China. "Luk" in Cantonese. The character also means "land".
- Lǔ 鲁/魯 (3rd tone), the 115th most common surname in China. "Lo" in Cantonese. The character also means "rude" or “foolish”, but the name originated from the ancient State of Lu.
- Lù 路 (4th tone), the 116th most common surname in China. "Lo" in Cantonese. The character also means "road".
- Lú 芦/蘆 (2nd tone), the 140th most common surname in China. "Lo" in Cantonese. The character also means "reed".
- Lù 禄/祿 (4th tone), not among the top 300 surnames in China. "Luk" in Cantonese. The character also means "salary".
- Lù 逯 (4th tone), not among the top 300 surnames in China. "Luk" in Cantonese. The character also means "leaving without reason".
- Lù 鹿 (4th tone), not among the top 300 surnames in China. "Luk" in Cantonese. The character also means "deer".

== Lü ==
The surname Lü 吕/呂 ("Lui" in Cantonese) is often romanized as Lu (also Lv and Lyu) when input of the double-dot is not possible.

== People surnamed "Lu" with unknown character ==
- Jessica Lu, American actress, model, and spokesperson
- Margaret Lu, Filipino-born American fencer
- Fanny Lu, stage name of Fanny Lucía Martínez Buenaventura (born February 8, 1973), Colombian singer, songwriter
- Lu Di (born 1975) Chinese swimmer

== Related names ==
- Roh (name) or Noh: a common Korean surname derived from Lú 卢/盧.
- Yuk, a Korean surname derived from Lù 陆/陸.
- Lục, a Vietnamese surname derived from Lù 陆/陸.

== See also ==
- Lou (surname 娄)
- Lou (surname 楼)
