= Lo =

Lo may refer to any of the following:

== Arts and entertainment ==
- Comic LO, a Japanese lolicon-focused erotic manga magazine
- Lo!, the third published nonfiction work of the author Charles Fort
- L.O., a fictional character in the Playhouse Disney show Happy Monster Band
- Lo (film), a 2009 independent film
- Lo Recordings, a London-based record company established in 1995
- Law & Order (franchise), several related American television series created by Dick Wolf
- Lost Odyssey, a 2007 role-playing video game
- Lore Olympus, a 2018 webcomic by Rachel Smithe
- LO, a 2021 album by The Kleptones

== Businesses and organizations ==
- Legal observer, a third-party organization that monitors protests or war zones in the interest of protecting human and civil rights
- Lo Recordings, a London-based record company established in 1995
- LO, abbreviation used for the national confederation of trade unions in several Scandinavian countries:
  - Landsorganisationen i Danmark (Danish Confederation of Trade Unions)
  - Landsorganisasjonen i Norge (Norwegian Confederation of Trade Unions)
  - Landsorganisationen i Sverige (Swedish Trade Union Confederation)
- Lutte Ouvrière ("workers' struggle"), a far-left French political party
- Leigh & Orange, an architectural company in Hong Kong
- London Overground, a state-run train operating company in London, United Kingdom
- LOT Polish Airlines (IATA code LO)

== Languages ==
- Lao language (ISO 639-1 code "lol")
- Loo language, an Adamawa language of Nigeria
- Lo-Toga language, an Oceanic language of Vanuatu
- Guro language, a Mande language of Ivory Coast

== People ==
=== Names ===
- Lo (given name)
- Lô, a Senegalese surname
- Lu (surname), Chinese surnames romanized as Lo according to the Cantonese pronunciation
  - Lu (surname 盧), written 卢 in simplified character
  - Lu (surname 魯), written 鲁 in simplified character
  - Lu (surname 路)
  - Lu (surname 蘆), written 芦 in simplified character
- Luo (surname) (羅/罗 or 駱/骆), a Chinese surname often romanized as Lo

=== Groups ===
- Lhoba people, also known as "Lo", tribespeople living in Southeastern Tibet

=== Individuals ===
- Skee-Lo, An African-American rapper, best known for his song, "I Wish"
- Leandro Lo (1989–2022), Brazilian jiu-jitsu black belt competitor

== Places ==
- Lo (island), of the Torres group in Vanuatu
- Kingdom of Lo, an ancient culturally Tibetan kingdom now known as Mustang in Nepal
- Lo, Belgium, a municipality in Belgium
- Lô River, a river of Vietnam
- Lake Orion, Michigan
- Lake Oswego, Oregon

== Science and technology ==
- Lo, an obsolete genus of rabbitfishes, now included in Siganus
- "Lo", the first message to travel across ARPANET, later to become the internet
- Learning object, in education and data management
- Left only, the left channel of the stereo Left only/Right only downmix
- LibreOffice, an open-source office software suite
- Local oscillator in, for example, a superheterodyne receiver

== Other uses ==
- Leader of the Opposition, a political position
- Liceum ogólnokształcące, a type of general academic high school in the Polish education system
- Loop jump, in figure skating scoring
- Lo mein, a dish
- Hello, a greeting

== See also ==
- Io (disambiguation)
