= Looi =

- Language: Chinese, Dutch

Origin
- Derivation: Chinese: Surname characters 雷 (Léi in Mandarin) or 呂 (Lǚ); Dutch: Given names Eligius, Lodewijk, or Ludolf
- Region of origin: Chinese: Spelling used in Malaysia and Singapore by descendants of migrants from Guangdong province; Dutch: Friesland, Groningen, southern Netherlands

Other names
- Variant forms: Chinese: Lui, Loi, Louie; Dutch: Looij

Looi is a surname.

== Origins ==
Like many other similarly-spelled surnames (Lui, Loi, Louie, etc.), it can originate from either of two Chinese surnames which are almost homophonous in Cantonese, though pronounced distinctly in Mandarin:

- Léi (雷), meaning "thunder" (Jyutping: Leoi4; Cantonese Yale: Lèuih). The spelling Looi might also originate from its pronunciation in various Southern Min dialects, e.g. Hokkien (Pe̍h-ōe-jī: Lûi) or Chaoshan (Peng'im: Lui5).
- Lǚ (呂), a toponymic surname from the ancient state of Lü (Jyutping: Leoi5; Cantonese Yale: Léuih; note the differing tone). The pronunciation in other varieties of Chinese is not similar to the surname meaning "thunder".

As a Dutch surname, Looi originated both as shortened version of van de Looi with the tussenvoegsels dropped, and as a patronymic surname derived from the given name Looi. That given name is a regional hypocorism of various other given names: it may be short for Ludolf, or for Lodewijk in Groningen and the southern Netherlands, or for Eligius in Friesland. Alternative spellings include Looij.

== Statistics ==
In the Netherlands, there were nine people with the surname Looi and 35 people with the surname van de Looi as of 2007, up from three and nine respectively in 1947.

== People ==
People with the surname Looi include:

- Looi Loon Teik (雷隆德; born 1945), Malaysian footballer
- Beatrice Looi (吕素君; born 1967), Malaysian bridal gown designer

People with the surname van de Looi include:

- Erwin van de Looi (born 1972), Dutch football manager
- Tom van de Looi (born 1999), Dutch football midfielder

== See also ==
- Van Looy, also a Dutch surname
