= Lui (surname) =

Origin
- Meaning: Chinese (雷): "thunder"; Eastern Lombard: "July"

Other names
- Variant forms: Chinese (雷, 呂): Loi, Louie, Looi; Italian: Giugni, Lugli

Lui is a surname in various cultures. It may be a variant spelling of two Chinese surnames (雷 Léi and 呂 Lǚ), as well as an Italian surname. The surname Lui can also be found on various Pacific Islands.

== Origins ==
Lui may be the spelling of various Chinese surnames, based on their pronunciation in different varieties of Chinese; they are listed below by their spelling in Hanyu Pinyin, which reflects the Mandarin Chinese pronunciation:

- Léi (Chinese: 雷), meaning "thunder"; the spelling Lui is based on the Cantonese pronunciation (Jyutping: Leoi4; Cantonese Yale: Lèuih). The spelling Lui is common in Hong Kong, while other spellings of the same surname such as Loi and Louie are found in Macau and among overseas Chinese.
- Lǚ (traditional Chinese: 呂; simplified Chinese: 吕); nearly-homophonous with the above in Cantonese (Jyutping: Leoi5; Cantonese Yale: Léuih; note the differing tone), and so also spelled Lui, Loi, or Louie.

Lui is also an Italian surname, derived from the name of the month of July in the Eastern Lombard dialect spoken in Mantua and surroundings (compare Italian luglio).

== Statistics ==
In Italy, 287 families bore the surname Lui, with 200 (69.7%) located in Lombardy.

According to statistics cited by Patrick Hanks, there were 488 people on the island of Great Britain and 18 on the island of Ireland with the surname Lui as of 2011. There were no people with the surname on the island of Great Britain in 1881.

The 2010 United States census found 6,156 people with the surname Lui, making it the 5,641st-most-common name in the country. This represented an increase from 5,620 (5,662nd-most-common) in the 2000 Census. In both censuses, about nine-tenths of the bearers of the surname identified as Asian, and roughly five per cent as White. It was the 216th-most-common surname among respondents to the 2000 Census who identified as Asian.

== People ==
=== Chinese surname Léi (雷) ===
- David Y.H. Lui (雷元熙; 1944–2011), Canadian arts producer of Chinese descent
- Simon Lui (雷宇揚; born 1964), Hong Kong actor
- Mark Lui (雷頌德; born 1969), Hong Kong Cantopop lyricist
- Elaine Lui (雷若芬; born 1973), Canadian television journalist
- Simon Lui (professor) (雷兆恆; born 1981), Hong Kong-born Singaporean computer music researcher
- Lui Man Tik (雷文迪; born 1994), Hong Kong football left back
- Lui Kit Ming (雷傑名; born 2000), Hong Kong football midfielder
- Lui Kim-man (雷劍文), Hong Kong financial and technical writer

=== Chinese surname Lǚ (呂) ===
- Lui Shou-Kwan (呂壽琨; 1919–1975), Hong Kong painter
- Lui Lok (呂樂; 1920–2010), Hong Kong police officer pursued by the Independent Commission Against Corruption
- Lui Che-woo (呂志和; born 1929), Guangdong-born Hong Kong member of the Standing Committee of the Chinese People's Political Consultative Conference
- Lui Tsun-Yuen (呂振原; 1931–2008), Chinese classical musician and composer
- Lui Ming-wah (呂明華; 1939–20??), Shandong-born Hong Kong Legislative Council member
- Ray Lui (呂良偉; born 1956), Vietnam-born Hong Kong actor
- Lui Tuck Yew (吕德耀; born 1961), Singaporean politician and diplomat
- Danny Lui (呂譚平; 1957–2012), Hong Kong entrepreneur and venture capitalist
- Lui Kam Chi (呂錦志; born 1973), Hong Kong rower
- Yvonne Lui (呂麗君; born 1977), Hong Kong philanthropist
- Koni Lui (呂慧儀; born 1982), Hong Kong beauty pageant titleholder
- Lui Chi Hing (呂志興; born 1984), Hong Kong football coach
- Barton Lui Pan-To (呂品韜; born 1993), Hong Kong short track speed skater
- Lui Lai Yiu (呂麗瑤; born 1994), Hong Kong hurdler
- Edan Lui (呂爵安; born 1997), Hong Kong singer
- John C.S. Lui (呂自成), Hong Kong computer scientist

=== Other or unknown ===
- Frank Lui (1935–2021), Niuean politician
- Joseph Lui (died 1941), Australian Anglican priest
- Elizabeth Gill Lui (born 1951), American photographer
- Mary Ting Yi Lui (born 1967), American history professor
- Diana Lui (born 1968), Malaysian-born Franco-Belgian artist
- Richard Lui (born c. 1972), American television journalist of Chinese descent
- Marco Lui (born 1975), Italian mime and comic
- Cynthia Lui (born 1977), Australian politician of Torres Straits Islander descent
- Lolo Lui (born 1982), Samoan rugby union player
- Anton Lui (born 1985), Papua New Guinean sprinter
- Gustavia Lui (born c. 1988), New Zealand businesswoman of Samoan and Tuvaluan descent
- Dunamis Lui (born 1990), Australian rugby league footballer
- Robert Lui (born 1990), Australian rugby league footballer of Torres Straits Islander descent
- Nakkiah Lui (born 1991), Australian writer of Gamilaroi and Torres Strait Islander descent
- Joseph Andy Lui (born 1994), Tongan sprinter
- Lauititi Lui (born 1995), Samoan weightlifter
- Getano Lui (Jnr), indigenous Australian community leader
- Jane Lui (born 1979), Hong Kong-born American singer songwriter
- Salesio Lui (born 1951), Tokelauan politician
- Samira Lui (born 1998), Italian showgirl and model
- Tunoa Lui, American Samoan association football coach
- Wonci Lui, American actress of Chinese descent

== See also ==
- Lui Paewai (1906–1970), New Zealand rugby union player.
- Lui Passaglia (born 1954), Canadian football player
- Lui Temelkovski (born 1954), Canadian politician
- Chan Fai Lui (born 1955), Hong Kong cyclist (surname Chan, given name Fai Lui)
- Lui Muavesi (born 1966), Fijian middle-distance runner
- Chan Tan Lui (陳丹蕾; born 1969), Hong Kong table tennis player (surname Chan, given name Tan Lui)
- Lui Shtini (born 1978), Albanian artist
- Lui Watanabe (born 1983), Japanese beauty pageant titleholder
- Lui Giuliani, Australian businessman
- Pour Lui, stage name of a Japanese singer
