= Lui (disambiguation) =

Lui (for him) is a French adult entertainment magazine.

Lui may also refer to:

- Lui (surname), various surnames (including a list of people with those surnames)
  - Lei (surname) (雷), a Chinese surname sometimes transliterated as Lui based on its Cantonese pronunciation
  - Lü (surname) (呂), a Chinese surname sometimes transliterated as Lui based on its Cantonese pronunciation
- Lui, South Sudan
- "Lui", 1980 French song by Michèle Torr
- Lui language, a name applied to several putative languages
- Takane Lui, a Japanese VTuber
- Lui Calibre, a YouTuber and game commentator; see VanossGaming § YouTube channel

== Acronyms and abbreviations ==
- Civil Aviation Authority (Hungary), Hungarian: Légügyi Igazgatóság, abbreviated LUI
- La Unión Airport (Honduras) (IATA: LUI)
- ISO 639:lui, the Uto-Aztecan Luiseño language of southern California
