= Lou =

Lou may refer to:

== Personal name ==
- Lou (given name), a list of people and fictional characters
- Lou (surname 娄), a Chinese surname
- Lou (surname 楼), a Chinese surname
- Lou (French singer), stage name of Lou Jean (born 2004)
- Lou (German singer), stage name of Louise Hoffner (born 1963)

== Arts and entertainment ==
- Lou (2010 film), an Australian film starring John Hurt
- Lou (2017 film), a Pixar short film
- Lou (2022 film), a Netflix crime thriller
- Lou!, a French series of comic books created by Julien Neel
- Lord of Ultima, a browser-based MMORTS game developed by EA

== Other uses ==
- Lyon Olympique Universitaire, a rugby union team playing in the Top14 competition of France
- Bowman Field (airport) (IATA airport code LOU), an airport in Louisville, Kentucky, USA
- Lou Island of Papua New Guinea
- Lou language (Austronesian) of Lou Island
- Lou language (Torricelli)
- Letter of understanding, a formal text that sums up the terms and understanding of a contract
- Lõu, village in Saaremaa Parish, Saare County, Estonia
- Lóu (娄) or Bond, a Chinese constellation

== See also ==
- Liu (disambiguation)
- Loo (disambiguation)
- Lu (disambiguation)
