= Loi (surname) =

Surname list

- Language: Chinese, Vietnamese, Meitei, Punjabi, others

Origin
- Meaning: Chinese (雷): "thunder"

Other names
- Variant forms: Chinese (雷): Lei, Lui, Louie; Chinese (呂): Lü, Lui, Louie; Chinese (黎): Li, Lai, Lye; Punjabi (Loi)

Loi is a surname of various origins. It may be a Punjabi surname common among (and exclusive to) Jatt Sikhs in Punjab, one of three Chinese surnames (雷, 呂, 黎), or a traditional surname from Sardinia.

== Origins ==
Loi may be the spelling of three Chinese surnames, based on their pronunciation in different varieties of Chinese; they are listed below by their spelling in Hanyu Pinyin, which reflects the Mandarin Chinese pronunciation:

- Léi (Chinese: 雷), meaning "thunder"; the spelling Loi is based on the Cantonese pronunciation (Jyutping: Leoi4; Cantonese Yale: Lèuih). The spelling Loi is common in Macau, while other spellings of the same surname such as Lui and Louie are found in Hong Kong and among overseas Chinese.
- Lǚ (traditional Chinese: 呂; simplified Chinese: 吕); nearly-homophonous with the above in Cantonese (Jyutping: Leoi5; Cantonese Yale: Léuih; note the differing tone), and so also spelled Loi, Lui, or Louie.
- Lí (Chinese: 黎), a fossil word meaning "black" or "brown". The spelling Loi is based on the pronunciation in various dialects of Southern Min (e.g. Teochew Peng'im: loi^{5}; IPA: /loi˥/)

The Chinese surname meaning "thunder" is spelled in Vietnamese as Lôi (IPA: [loj˧], that being the Sino-Vietnamese pronunciation of the original Chinese character).

Loi is a surname found in Punjab, it is a common Sikh Jatt surname used by farmers/landowners. The surname Loi only belongs to the Jatt caste within the Sikh and Punjabi community.

As an Italian surname, Loi appears to have originated as a shortened form of some given name, possibly the Sardinian Balloe/Balloi, or the Sicilian Aloi (the local form of the name Eligio).

Loi may also be a Greek surname.

== Statistics ==
In Italy, 2,716 families bore the surname Loi, with the great majority of them (2,061, 76%) located in Sardinia, and only 10 (0.5%) located in Sicily.

According to statistics cited by Patrick Hanks, there were 282 people on the island of Great Britain and one on the island of Ireland with the surname Loi as of 2011. There was one person with the surname Loi on the island of Great Britain in 1881.

The 2010 United States census found 1,357 people with the surname Loi, making it the 19,814th-most-common name in the country. This represented an increase from 985 (23,922nd-most-common) in the 2000 Census. In both censuses, slightly fewer than nine-tenths of the bearers of the surname identified as Asian, and between six and eight per cent as White. It was the 1,056th-most-common surname among respondents to the 2000 Census who identified as Asian.

== People ==
- Francesco Loi (1891–1977), Italian gymnast from Cagliari, Sardinia
- Loi Ah Koon (黎亞坤; fl. 1926–?), Hainan-born founder of the Singapore-based Ya Kun Kaya Toast café chain
- Duilio Loi (1929–2008), Italian boxer
- Franco Loi (1930–2021), Italian poet
- Bruno Loi (born 1941), Italian Army lieutenant general
- Vittorio Loi (1942–2015), Italian wheelchair fencer from Nuoro, Sardinia
- Maria Antonietta Loi (born 1973), Italian physicist from Cagliari, Sardinia
- Loi Wai Long (雷偉隆; born 1989), Macau football defender
- Cleo Loi (born c. 1991), Australian astrophysicist
- Loi Wai Hong (雷偉洪; born 1992), Macau football defender
- Antonio Loi (born 1996), Italian football midfielder from Isili, Sardinia
- Livio Loi (born 1997), Belgian motorcycle racer
- Loi Im Lan (呂艷蘭; born 1998), Macau sprinter
- Sherene Loi, Australian oncologist

== See also ==
- LOI (disambiguation)
