= Lu clan of Fanyang =

The Lu clan of Fanyang (范陽盧氏) was a Chinese political clan active from the late Eastern Han dynasty to the early Song dynasty. They descended from a noble clan in Qi, a ducal state under the Zhou dynasty. Their family name, Lu 盧, was derived from the name of the fief conferred upon them by the ruling Jiang family of Qi. In 386 BCE, after Duke Tai of the Tian family seized the rulership of Qi from the Jiang family, the Lu family, which was related to the Jiang (姜) family, lost their hereditary fiefs and property and became a family in diaspora. Later, the Lu family settled down in Fanyang Commandery, which covered present-day Beijing, Tianjin and Baoding.

== Notable figures ==
The first notable figure of this Lu clan was Lu Zhi, a prominent Confucian scholar and official who lived in the Eastern Han dynasty and mentored other notable figures such as Liu Bei and Gongsun Zan. When the Yellow Turban Rebellion broke out in the 180s, Lu Zhi was one of the commanders who led Han imperial forces to suppress the rebellion. As a result, Lu Zhi and his family gained fame and prominence.

During the Northern Wei dynasty, three men from the Lu clan married princesses in Northern Wei. The Lu clan was also one of the four influential families of northern China at the time. However, some historical records show that members of the Lu family disregarded laws and behaved lawlessly, so some contemporary historians have negative opinions about them.

The Lu clan's fame and influence faded by the beginning of the Song dynasty, and it ceased to be mentioned in historical records around the end of the 10th century. From the Tang dynasty to the early Song dynasty, there were a total of ten men from the Lu family who served as chancellors in the imperial government. An account also cited that Han Yu, a prominent writer and government official of the Tang dynasty, married the daughter Lu I, an important member of the Lu clan. Records also show that around 800, the Lu clan was still a prominent family with members occupying important posts or marrying imperial bureaucrats. The records by Shen Kuo (1031-1095) identified the family as one of the most powerful and prestigious clans during the Tang dynasty, along with the Cui clan of Boling, Li clan of Longxi, Cui clan of Qinghe, and the Zheng clan of Xingyang. These were described as "lineages of the First Class".

== Branches ==
- Southern ancestry (南祖)
  - Elder sub-branch of the southern ancestry (南祖大房)
- northern ancestry (北祖)
  - Elder sub-branch of the northern ancestry (北祖大房)
  - Second sub-branch of the northern ancestry (北祖第二房)
  - Third sub-branch of the northern ancestry (北祖第三房)
  - Fourth sub-branch of the northern ancestry (北祖第四房)
  - Dishi sub-branch (帝師房)

== Chancellors ==
- Lu Chengqing from the elder sub-branch of the northern ancestry
- Lu Shang from the second sub-branch of the northern ancestry
- Lu Han from the second sub-branch of the northern ancestry
- Lu Mai from the second sub-branch of the northern ancestry
- Lu Huaishen from the third sub-branch of the northern ancestry
- Lu Qi
- Lu Guangqi
- Lu Wenji from the fourth sub-branch of the northern ancestry
- Lu Duoxun from the fourth sub-branch of the northern ancestry
