= Lǔ =

Lǔ may refer to:

- Shandong, province of China
- Lǔ, a Chinese method of red cooking of meat

== See also ==
- Lu (disambiguation)
