= Lue =

Lue or LUE may refer to:

== People ==
- Andrew Lue (born 1992), Canadian retired football player
- Lue Gim Gong (1860–1925), Chinese-American horticulturalist
- Lee Lue (1935–1969), Laotian Hmong fighter-bomber pilot
- Linlyn Lue, Canadian actress
- Robert Lue (1964–2020), Jamaican-born American researcher and academic
- Rufin Lué (born 1968), Ivorian footballer
- Tyronn Lue (born 1977), American professional basketball player
- Wang Lüe (born 1985), Chinese footballer
- Tai Lue people, one of the 56 recognized ethnic groups of China

== Places ==
- Lue, New South Wales, a small town in Australia
  - Lue railway station
- Lüe, a commune in Nouvelle-Aquitaine, France
- Lue (Colunga), a parish in northern Spain

== Other uses ==
- Han Lue, a fictional character in the Fast & Furious franchise
- Life, the Universe and Everything, a book by Douglas Adams
- LUE, IATA airport code for Lučenec Airport

== See also ==
- Donald De Lue (1897–1988), American sculptor
