= Jiang Dounu =

Chinese Ming Dynasty singer and actress

Jiang Dounu (Chinese: 江斗奴; pinyin: Jiāng Dǒunú) was a Chinese courtesan and stage performer active in Beijing during the Xuande period (1426–1435) of the Ming dynasty. Her mother Qi Yaxiu (齊亞秀) was also a famous actress. Her stories as told by a military official surnamed Liu (劉) are recorded in Lu Cai's biji book Yecheng Kelun (冶城客論).

Jiang Dounu was said to be a favorite of the general Zhang Fu. Once Zhang invited the "Three Yang's" (Yang Shiqi, Yang Rong, and Yang Pu, all senior grand secretaries) to a banquet at Jiang Dounu's private quarters. They played a poetry-drinking game, during which Jiang Dounu showed her literary brilliance by composing verses that perfectly match those of these highly-educated men. Yang Shiqi was so impressed and enamored that he allegedly remarked to his colleagues that younger men would have an even harder time resisting beauties like her. Soon afterward, they submitted a memorial banning officials from spending nights at Geji quarters.

Like many courtesans at the time, Jiang also sang beiqu (a northern style of zaju) on stage. Once, after she starred in Romance of the Western Chamber which lasted for three consecutive days, a man from Jiangxi went up to the stage and told her bluntly that she didn't deserve her fame because several of her notes were wrong. Jiang was embarrassed but told him to visit her the next morning. The man did that and was treated to a meal by Jiang and her mother. Qi Yaxiu, already blind from an eye disease, asked the visitor to sing something because she could still hear. The man grabbed a pipa and almost as soon as he began singing, Qi recognized that he was the singing coach of the Prince of Ning (Zhu Quan, based in Jiangxi). Jiang Dounu became his pupil and received private training for the next ten days before he resumed his traveling.
