= Yook =

Korean family name (육)

- Hangul: 육
- Hanja: 陸
- RR: Yuk
- MR: Yuk

Yook, also spelled Yuk or Youk, is an uncommon Korean family name. It is written with the same Hanja character as the Chinese surname, Lu (陸). It has only one clan, the Okcheon Yook clan, based in Okcheon County, North Chungcheong Province. According to the 2015 South Korean census, there were 23,455 people with the surname, Yook.

== Origin ==
In 927, during the reign of King Gyeongsun of Silla, Yook Bo (Korean: 육보; Hanja: 陸普) was sent by the Tang dynasty to Korea to spread Confucianism. Yook Bo was from China's Zhejiang Province. Yook Bo settled in Korea, and was buried in Gwanseong, the old name for Okcheon. Hence, the bon-gwan is located in Okcheon.

== Notable people ==
- Yuk Young-soo (born 1925), wife of South Korea's 3rd president, Park Chung-hee and mother of the 11th president, Park Geun-hye
- Yook Sung-jae (born 1995), South Korean singer and actor, member of BtoB
- Yuk Ji-dam (born 1997), South Korean rapper

== See also ==
- Culture of Korea
- Korean name
- List of Korean family names
- Okcheon Yook clan
