= Loei (disambiguation) =

Loei or Loi : a clan and surname of Jat Sikhs from Punjab, India, they are descendants of Gill Jats. They only belong to the Jat tribe.

Loei may also refer to:

- Loi (surname) Jat Sikh
- Loei City F.C., a Thai semi-professional football club
- Gill
- Loei River
