= Sidão =

Sidão or Sidao is a given name and nickname. Notable people with the name include:

- Sidão (volleyball), the nickname of Sidnei dos Santos Júnior, Brazilian volleyball player
- Sidão (footballer), the nickname of Sidney Aparecido Ramos da Silva, Brazilian footballer
- Jia Sidao (1213–1275), chancellor during the late Song dynasty of China
- Lu Sidao (531–582), Chinese poet of the Sui dynasty
