= Change of Xianbei names to Han names =

Sinicization campaign in the 5th and 6th centuries

The change of Xianbei family names to Han names was part of a larger sinicization campaign. It was at its peak intensity under Emperor Xiaowen of the Northern Wei dynasty in 496.

== Changes ==
During the reign of Emperor Xiaowen, the Northern Wei underwent a process of systematic sinicization. A number of policies were enacted, including moving the capital closer to the agricultural Han Chinese in Luoyang and forbidding the use of Xianbei style clothing and language in court.

In 496, Emperor Xiaowen ordered Xianbei family names that were two-to-three syllables to be shortened to one-to-two syllables, converting them to Han names. This policy included his own family, as they changed their family name from Tuoba (拓跋) to Yuan (元). Later historians, including Wei Shou, the author of the official history of Northern Wei, Book of Wei, found shortened Han-style names to be easier to write about, and therefore used post-496 family names even where pre-496 events involving Northern Wei were described.

=== Change of Han names to Xianbei names under Yuwen Tai ===
Later, after the division of Northern Wei into two in 534, the paramount general of Western Wei, Yuwen Tai issued several reforms to strengthen the military by promoting a Xianbei warrior culture. As part of these reforms, in 549, he reversed Emperor Xiaowen's earlier policy by restoring Xianbei surnames and bestowing them as rewards to accomplished officials. For example, the future ruling Yang (楊) clan of the Sui dynasty were given the surname Puliuru (普六茹), while the Li (李) clan of the Tang dynasty were given Daye (大野). This practice was carried on by the succeeding Northern Zhou dynasty.

Yuwen Tai's policy was only in place for thirty years; in 579, near the end of the Northern Zhou, the regent Yang Jian permanently restored the use of Han names for both Han and Xianbei alike. As a compromise, there were some exceptions, for example, the clan of Emperor Wen of Sui's wife Empress Dugu kept their Xianbei name of Dugu (獨孤) and did not once again change the name into Liu (劉).

== Name correspondence ==
Below is a list of the Xianbei names that are known to have been changed into Han names:

- Tuoba (拓跋) (imperial clan name) -> Yuan (元)
- Tufa (秃髮) -> Yuan (源)
- Gegu (紇骨) -> Hu (胡)
- Pu (普) -> Zhou (周)
- Baba (拔拔) -> Zhangsun (長孫)
- Daxi (達奚) -> Xi (奚)
- Yilou (伊婁) -> Yi (伊)
- Qiudun (丘敦) -> Qiu (丘)
- Xiqihai (係俟亥) -> Hai (亥)
- Yizhan (乙旃) -> Shusun (叔孫)
- Chekun (車焜) -> Che (車)
- Qiumuling (丘穆陵) -> Mu (穆)
- Buliugu (步六孤) -> Lu (陸)
- Helai (賀賴) -> He (賀)
- Dugu (獨孤) -> Liu (劉)
- Helou (賀樓) -> Lou (樓)
- Wuniuyu (勿忸于) -> Yu (于)
- Shilian (是連) -> Lian (連)
- Pulan (僕闌) -> Pu (僕)
- Ruogan (若干) -> Gou (苟)
- Balielan (拔列蘭) -> Liang (梁)
- Bolue (撥略) -> Su (蘇)
- Ruokouyin (若口引) -> Kou (寇)
- Chiluo (叱羅) -> Luo (羅)
- Pulouru (普陋茹) -> Ru (茹)
- Hege (賀葛) -> Ge (葛)
- Shiben (是賁) -> Feng (封)
- Afugan (阿扶干) -> A (阿)
- Kediyan (可地延) -> Yan (延)
- Aluhuan (阿鹿桓) -> Lu (鹿)
- Taluoba (他駱拔) -> Luo (駱)
- Boxi (薄奚) -> Bo (薄)
- Wuwan (烏丸) -> Huan (桓)
- Suhe (素和) -> He (和)
- Hugukouyin (胡古口引) or Gukouyin (古口引) -> Hou (侯)
- Yuhun (谷渾) -> Hun (渾)
- Pilou (匹婁) -> Lou (婁)
- Qilifa (俟力伐) -> Bao (鮑)
- Tufulu (吐伏盧) -> Lu (盧)
- Dieyun (牒云) -> Yun (云)
- Shiyun (是云) -> Shi (是)
- Chili (叱利) -> Li (利)
- Fulü (副呂) -> Fu (副)
- Ruluo (如羅) -> Ru (如)
- Qifu (乞扶) -> Fu (扶)
- Kedan (可單 or 渴單) -> Dan (單) (Shàn)
- Qiji (俟幾) -> Ji (幾)
- He'er (賀兒) -> Er (兒)
- Tuxi (吐奚) -> Gu (古)
- Chulian (出連) -> Bi (畢)
- Heba (賀拔) -> He (何)
- Chilü (叱呂) -> Lü (呂)
- Monalou (莫那婁) -> Mo (莫)
- Xidoulu (奚斗盧) -> Suolu (索盧)
- Molu (莫蘆) -> Lu (蘆)
- Budahan (步大汗) -> Han (韓)
- Moluzhen (沒路真) -> Lu (路)
- Hudigan (扈地干) -> Hu (扈)
- Muyu (慕輿) -> Yu (輿)
- Gegan (紇干) -> Gan (干)
- Qifujin (俟伏斤) -> Fu (伏)
- Shilou (是樓) -> Gao (高)
- Qutu (屈突) -> Qu (屈)
- Talu (沓盧) -> Ta (沓)
- Washilan (嗢石蘭) -> Shi (石)
- Jiepi (解枇) -> Jie (解) (Xie)
- Qijin (奇斤) -> Qi (奇)
- Xubu (須卜) -> Bu (卜)
- Qiulin (丘林) -> Lin (林)
- Damogan (大莫干) -> Ge (郃)
- Ermian (尒綿) -> Mian (綿)
- Gailou (蓋樓) -> Gai (蓋)
- Suli (素黎) -> Li (黎)
- Yidoujuan (壹斗眷) -> Ming (明)
- Chimen (叱門) -> Men (門)
- Suliujin (宿六斤) -> Su (宿)
- Bibi (馝纰) -> Bi (纰)
- Tunan (土難) -> Shan (山)
- Wuyin (屋引) -> Fang (房)
- Shuluogan (樹洛干) -> Shu (樹)
- Yifu (乙弗) -> Yi (乙)
- Maojuan (茂眷) -> Mao (茂)
- Youlian (宥連) -> Yun (雲)
- Gedouling (紇豆陵) -> Dou (竇)
- Houmochen (侯莫陳) -> Chen (陳)
- Kudi (庫狄) -> Di (狄)
- Tailuoji (太洛稽) -> Ji (稽)
- Keba (柯拔) -> Ke (柯)
- Yuchi (尉遲) -> Yu (尉)
- Bulugen (步鹿根) -> Bu (步)
- Poduoluo (破多羅) -> Pan (潘)
- Chigan (叱干) -> Xue (薛)
- Qinu (俟奴) -> Qi (俟)
- Nianchi (輾遲) -> Zhan (展)
- Feilian (費連) -> Fei (費)
- Qilian (其連) -> Qi (綦)
- Qujin (去斤) -> Ai (艾)
- Kehou (渴侯) -> Gou (緱)
- Chilu (叱盧) -> Zhu (祝)
- Heji (和稽) -> Huan (緩)
- Tulai (菟賴) -> Jiu (就)
- Wapen (嗢盆) -> Wen (溫)
- Dabo (達勃) -> Bao (褒)
- Duguhun (獨孤渾) -> Du (杜)
- Helan (賀蘭) -> He (賀)
- Yuyuanzhen (郁原甄) -> Zhen (甄)
- Gexi (紇奚) -> Ji (嵇)
- Yuele (越勒) -> Yue (越)
- Chinu (叱奴) -> Lang (狼)
- Kezhuhun (渴燭渾) -> Zhu (朱)
- Kunuguan (庫褥官) -> Ku (庫)
- Wuluolan (烏洛蘭) -> Lan (蘭)
- Yinalou (一那蔞) -> Lou (蔞)
- Yufu (羽弗) -> Yu (羽)

== Major Xianbei names that were not changed ==
Several major Xianbei clan names were apparently judged by Emperor Xiaowen to be sufficiently Han-like not to be changed. These included:

- Tuyuhun (吐谷渾)
- Heruo (賀若)
- Na (那)
- Yu (庾)

== See also ==
- Hundred family names
- Chinese surname
