= LOI =

LOI, Loi, or LoI may refer to:

== People ==
- Loi (surname), a surname with various origins, including a list of people with the surname
- Lê Lợi (c. 1384–1433), first emperor of Vietnam's Lê dynasty
- Loi (singer), German singer

== Abbreviations ==
- League of Ireland, association football
- Letter of intent, in law
- Limited Overs International, type of cricket match
- Limiting oxygen index, in chemistry
- Loss on ignition, in analytical chemistry
- Lunar orbit insertion, a propulsive manoeuvre used to put a spacecraft in an orbit around the Moon
- Medium of instruction, also known as Language of instruction and abbreviated as LOI or LoI
- Lodge of Instruction, a type of Masonic Lodge meeting.

== Other uses ==
- Loi, a word in India's Meitei language for the term "scheduled caste"
- French for "law"
- Loi (ancient city)
