= Lô =

Lô is a surname. Notable people with the surname include:

- Cheikh Lô (born 1955), Senegalese musician
- Ismaël Lô (born 1956), Senegalese musician
- Maodo Lô (born 1992), German basketball player

== See also ==
- LO (disambiguation)
- Saint-Lô
