= Wuniuyu Lidi =

- 勿忸于栗磾

General Who Guards the South (鎮南將軍)
- In office ?–?
- Monarch: Emperor Taiwu of Northern Wei

Personal details
- Born: Unknown Yu County, Hebei
- Died: Unknown
- Children: Wuniuyu Loba (勿忸于洛拔)
- Han name: Yu Lidi (于栗磾)
- Peerage: Duke of Xincheng (新城公)

Wuniuyu Lidi (fl. 386–428), Han name Yu Lidi, was a Xianbei military general of the Northern Wei during the Northern and Southern dynasties. Serving three generations of the Tuoba emperor, he gained renown for his martial prowess and sound administration, often entrusted with pacifying the population of newly conquered territories. During Emperor Mingyuan's southern campaign of 422–423, he helped capture and revitalize the important Chinese city of Luoyang, which would later serve as a capital of the Northern Wei.

Wuniuyu was the progenitor of the prominent Yu clan of Henan (河南于氏). He was also known for his unique title of "Black Lance General" (黑槊將軍), which initially given to him by the Eastern Jin commander, Liu Yu and later recognized by Emperor Mingyuan.

== Service under Emperor Daowu ==
Wuniuyu Lidi was a native of the Tuoba-Xianbei state of Dai. He was learned in martial arts from a young age, and was described as possessing extraordinary strength and talent, being able use either one of his hands to fire a bow while on horseback. During the Dengguo era (386–396), he was first appointed as a Champion General and was granted the fiefly title of Viscount of Xin'an. In 396, Tuoba Gui (Emperor Daowu of Northern Wei), intending to attack the Later Yan emperor, Murong Bao at Zhongshan (中山, in modern Baoding, Hebei), ordered Wuniuyu and Gongsun Lan (公孫蘭) to lead 20,000 troops to open up and repair the plank road previously built by the famed, Western Han general, Han Xin at Taiyuan. When Tuoba later arrived with his forces, he was pleased by the work they had done, so he rewarded Wuniuyu with a famous steed.

In 398, after driving the Later Yan out of the Central Plains, Tuoba Gui held a celebratory feast for his ministers. During the feast, he praised Wuniuyu by saying, "You are both my Ying Bu and Peng Yue," before rewarding him a large amount of gold and silk and elevating his title to the Duke of Xin'an. Not long after, Wuniuyu followed Tuoba Gui on a hunting trip at Mount Baideng. The story goes that their party saw a bear with several cubs. Tuoba turned to him and remarked, "With your courage and skills, why don't you go fight them?" Wuniuyu replied, "Of all things under Heaven, humanity is the most precious. If I were to fight and lose, wouldn't that be a waste of a valiant warrior? Anyhow, I shall subdue and bring them before Your Majesty's seat." He then captured the bears, and Tuoba apologized to him.

== Service under Emperor Mingyuan ==
In 410, a year after Emperor Mingyuan ascended the throne, bandits arose and stirred up trouble in various parts around Xihe Commandery and the Guandong region (關東; east of Tong Pass). Mingyuan dispatched Wuniuyu Lidi with 10,000 cavalry to deal with the issue. After pacifying the regions, Wuniuyu was commissioned by the emperor to guard Pingyang. He was transferred to General Who Guards Distant Lands and Garrison Commander of Henei. His title was also changed to Baron of Xincheng County. Throughout his tenure, Wuniuyu was successful in winning over the people of newly conquered territory.

=== Incident with Liu Yu ===
In 416, the Eastern Jin commander, Liu Yu, carried out his northern expedition to conquer the Later Qin dynasty, during which he led his navy to sail up the Yellow River through Northern Wei territory. Fearing an invasion, Wuniuyu Lidi brought his forces to set camp on the banks of the river and heavily fortified the area. Liu Yu was unsettled by Wuniuyu's tight defenses and dared not advance. He sent a letter to Wuniuyu asking for permission to pass through his territory to invade Later Qin, citing the historical example of Sun Quan's attack on Guan Yu. Wuniuyu often brandished his favourite black lance, so in the beginning of his letter, Liu Yu addressed Wuniuyu as the "Black Lance General". Wuniuyu reported this matter to Emperor Mingyuan, who praised him and formally bestowed him the title of Black Lance General.

=== Capturing and pacifying Luoyang ===
In 423, three years after the Liu Song dynasty supplanted the Eastern Jin, Emperor Mingyuan launched a campaign to capture the Henan region from the Song. While Wei forces under Daxi Jin besieged Hulao Pass, Wuniuyu Lidi led his army to attack the Song Administrator of Henan, Wang Juanzhi (王涓之) at Jinyong Fortress (金墉城) near Luoyang. Wang abandoned his post and fled, allowing Wuniuyu to occupy Luoyang. Previously, Luoyang had been the capital of successive Chinese dynasties, but by the time it fell to the Northern Wei, it had been reduced to a border city and laid in ruins for more than a century. Wuniuyu had his men clear the weeds and cultivate the wastelands, comforting and reassuring the people who came to him. Through appeasement and deterrence, he managed to win the support of the local populace.

When Emperor Mingyuan arrived at Mengjin for his southward march, he asked Wuniuyu, "Will it be possible to ford the Yellow River?" Wuniuyu replied, "I recall that Du Yu once built a bridge." He then had his men arrange his ships and link them together, forming a pontoon bridge at Yeban (冶坂; southwest of present-day Mengzhou, Henan). After the army crossed the Yellow River, Emperor Mingyuan praised him highly.

== Service under Emperor Taiwu ==
In 426, during the reign of Emperor Taiwu, the Northern Wei carried out a large-scale invasion of the Helian Xia. Wuniuyu Lidi and Pu Ji were tasked with attacking the city of Shancheng (陝城, in modern Sanmenxia, Henan). The Xia Administrator of Hongnong, Cao Da (曹達) fled Shancheng without a fight, so Wuniuyu and Pu Ji capitalized by rapidly advancing all the way to the Sanfu region (三輔; around present-day Xi'an, Shaanxi). For his merits, Wuniuyu was granted the title of General Who Stabilises the South, and his peerage was promoted to Duke of Xincheng.

After the fall of the Xia capital, Tongwan in 428, Wuniuyu was further promoted to Garrison Commander of Puban. At the time, revolts broke out in the commanderies of Hongnong, Henan and Shangdang, so Wuniuyu led his army and quelled them. He was then transferred to Garrison Commander of Hulao and given the title of General of the Henan Army. Soon, he was promoted to Chief Controller military affairs in the two provinces of Yan and Xiang, General Who Guards the South and Commander of Fangtou. He also served as a high-ranking official in the outer capital, earning great prestige for his fair judgments and sentencing.

Wuniuyu died in an unknown year at the age of 75. He was bestowed a coffin, a set of court robes, and a set of noble outer garments. Emperor Taiwu deeply mourned his death and posthumously granted him the title of Grand Commandant.
