= Xin Maojiang =

Chinese general and politician

- Traditional Chinese: 辛茂將
- Simplified Chinese: 辛茂将
Transcriptions
Standard Mandarin
- Hanyu Pinyin: Xīn Màojiāng
- Wade–Giles: Hsin Mao-chiang

Xin Maojiang (died 3 January 660) was a Chinese general and politician of the Tang dynasty, serving as chancellor for about a year during the reign of Emperor Gaozong.

== Background ==
Despite Xin Maojiang's high status, little is firmly established about his background or career except for the years that he served as chancellor—as, unusual for a chancellor, he did not have a biography in either the Old Book of Tang or the New Book of Tang. (The table of chancellors family trees in the New Book of Tang gave his grandfather's name as Xin Zheng (辛政) and father's name as Xin Zhao (辛肇), but did not give any office titles for them, implicitly indicating that they were not governmental officials.) Little is known about Xin Maojiang's career prior to his becoming chancellor in 658.

== Service under Emperor Gaozong ==
As of 658, during the reign of Emperor Gaozong, Xin Maojiang was serving as the chief judge of the supreme court, when he was made Palace Attendant, the head of the Chancellery and a default chancellor. In summer 659, he and fellow chancellor Xu Jingzong were put in charge of an investigation of an alleged treason plot by the low level officials Wei Jifang (韋季方) and Li Chao (李巢), although it was Xu, an ally of Emperor Gaozong's powerful wife Empress Wu (later known as Wu Zetian), who spearheaded the investigation who ultimately convinced Emperor Gaozong that his uncle and chancellor Zhangsun Wuji, who had implicitly disapproved of Empress Wu's ascension (replacing Emperor Gaozong's first wife Empress Wang) in 655 by refusing to concur in the decision, was part of the plot. As a result of further investigations ordered by Emperor Gaozong (which not only Xin and Xu, but also Li Ji, Ren Yaxiang, and Lu Chengqing were involved in), Zhangsun was first exiled and then forced to commit suicide. Xin himself died around new year 660, and if he was given a posthumous name or noble title, neither is recorded in history.
