= Ren Yaxiang =

Tang dynasty general (died 662)

Ren Yaxiang (Chinese: 任雅相; died March 9, 662) was a Chinese military general and politician during the Tang dynasty, serving as chancellor during the reign of Emperor Gaozong.

== Background ==
Despite Ren Yaxiang's high status, little is firmly established about his background or career except for the years that he served as chancellor—as, unusual for a chancellor, he did not have a biography in either the Old Book of Tang or the New Book of Tang. It is known that he was from Weinan.

== Service under Emperor Gaozong ==
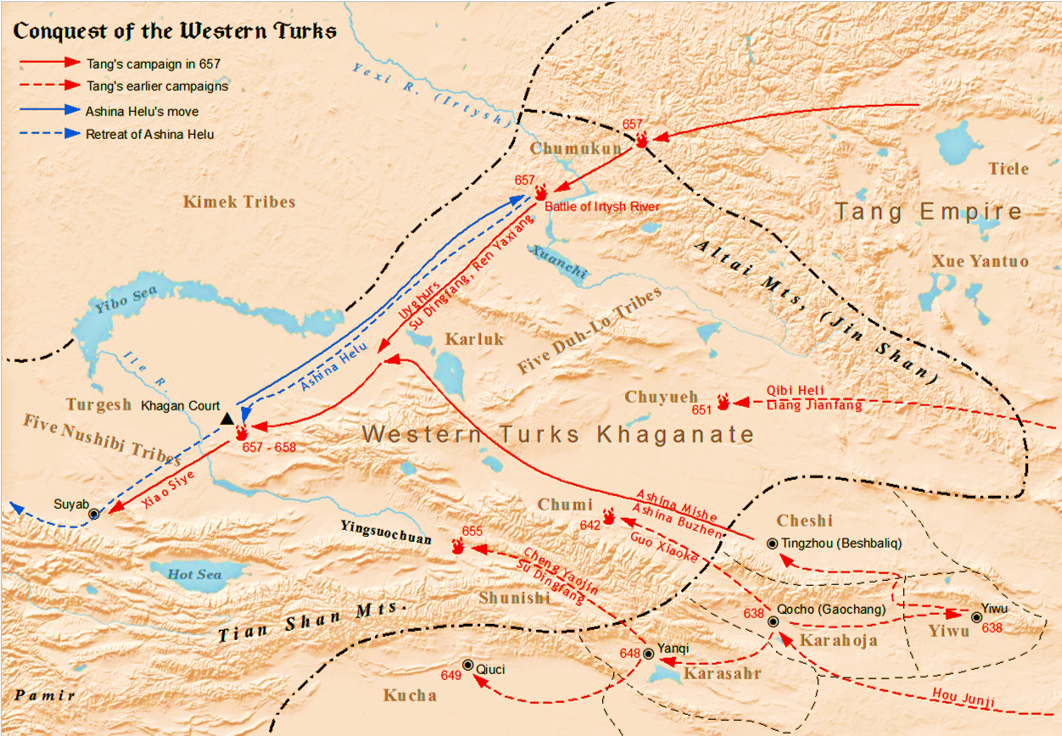
Ren Yaxiang's campaign against Western Turks with Su Dingfang

As of 657, during the reign of Emperor Gaozong, Ren Yaxiang was serving as Protector General of Yanran (燕然, headquartered in modern Bayan Nur, Inner Mongolia), when he was made a deputy to the general Su Dingfang in Su's campaign against Western Tujue's Shabuolüe Khan Ashina Helu (阿史那賀魯). He later participated in Su's battles against Ashina Helu and was a participant in the victories, which ultimately resulted in Ashina Helu's capture by another deputy of Su, Xiao Siye (蕭嗣業).

As of 659, Ren was serving as minister of defense, when he was given the designation of Canzhi Zhengshi (參知政事), making him a chancellor de facto. Later that year, when the former chancellor and Emperor Gaozong's uncle Zhangsun Wuji, who had already been exiled on suspicion of treason, was accused of further plotting, Ren, along with fellow chancellors Li Ji, Xu Jingzong, Xin Maojiang, and Lu Chengqing were put in charge of the investigation (although it was Xu, who was an ally of Emperor Gaozong's powerful wife Empress Wu (later known as Wu Zetian), who drove the investigation), which resulted in Zhangsun's forced suicide.

In 661, when Emperor Gaozong launched a major campaign against Goguryeo, Ren was one of generals commissioned with a major part of the force, along with Su, Xiao, and Qibi Heli (契苾何力). He died in spring 662, while still serving on the campaign against Goguryeo.

It was said that during Ren's service as major general, he never promoted his friends or relatives, but rather, when there were positions to be filled, would always request the proper agencies to fill them. Explaining his actions, he said, "Offices, no matter great or small, are all offices of the state. How can I use them to satisfy my own desires?" It was therefore said that within his army, rewards and punishments were fair, and that the people admired Ren for his fairness.

== Notes and references ==
- Zizhi Tongjian, vol. 200.
