= Luu (disambiguation) =

Luu is a Vietnamese surname.

Luu or LUU may also refer to:

- Lu (surname 魯), a Chinese surname also spelled Luu in the uncommon Gwoyeu Romatzyh system
- Leeds University Union, the representative body for the students at the University of Leeds, England
- Yakkha language (ISO 639: luu), a Sino-Tibetan language spoken in Nepal
- Laura Airport (IATA: LUU), an airport in Queensland, Australia
