= Yuan (surname 元) =

Chinese family name

Yuán is the 91st name on the Hundred Family Surnames poem. The ruling family of Northern Wei changed their surname from Tuoba (拓跋) to Yuan during the Change of Xianbei names to Han names. According to a 2013 study, it was the 384th-most common surname, shared by 92,000 people or 0.0069% of the population, with the province with the most being Henan.

== Notable people ==
- Yuan Zai (元載) (713–777), courtesy name Gongfu (公輔), formally Duke Huang of Yingchuan (潁川荒公) and then Duke Chengzong of Yingchuan (潁川成縱公), Duke Zhong of Yingchuan (潁川忠公), was an official of the Chinese Tang Dynasty
- Yuan Haowen (Chinese: 元好問; pinyin: Yuán Hàowèn; Wade–Giles: Yüan Hao-wên) also known as Yuan Yishan (遺山/遗山) or “Yuan of Yi Mountain” (1190–1257) was a poet from Xinzhou, in what is now Shanxi province
