= Luò (surname) =

Luo
Other names
- Variant forms: Luo (Mandarin); Loc, Lock, Lok or Locke (Cantonese)

Luò (traditional Chinese: 駱; simplified Chinese: 骆) is a Chinese surname, also spelled Lo in Wade–Giles romanization. It is rendered Loc, Lock, Lok or Locke in Cantonese.

According to a 2013 study it was the 163rd most common surname, shared by 960,000 people or 0.073% of the population, with Guangdong province having the most.

In Japan, the name 駱 is pronounced as かわらげ Kawarage. In Vietnamese 駱 is pronounced Lạc.

It means ‘a white horse with a black mane’ in archaic Chinese.

== Origins ==
- From the personal name Luo, the style name of a prince in Qi.
- from the name of Da Luo (大駱), a descendant of an official of the Shang dynasty. His eldest son, Cheng, established the Da Luo (大駱) state in an unknown location in northwest China named after his father. After it was annexed by an ethnic group during the reign of King Li of Zhou, people from the state adopted Luo as their surname.
- from the personal name Luo (駱), the given name of a royal member in Zheng (located in part of present-day Shaanxi and Henan provinces) during the Spring and Autumn period
- from the Tuo Luo Ba family (佗駱拔, also written as 他駱拔,他駱 伏, 地駱拔) from the Xianbei people in who changed their original surname during the Northern Wei dynasty
- family name of the Tuyuhun ethnic group, originating in the Five Dynasties and Ten Kingdoms period

== Notable people ==
=== 駱 ===
- Luo Binwang, Chinese poet of the Tang Dynasty
- Gary Locke (born 1950, ancestry Taishan, Guangdong), American politician, former United States Ambassador to China
- Luo Huining (骆惠宁; born 1954), senior member of the Chinese Communist Party
- Felix Lok, Hong Kong actor
- Wayne Lo (born 1974), a Taiwanese-American murderer
- Loh Kean Yew (骆建佑; born 1997), Singaporean badminton player
- Liqun Luo (骆利群; born 1966), neuroscientist in the Department of Biology at Stanford University
- Zhe-Xi Luo (骆泽喜), Chinese-born American paleontologist
- Luo Xiaojuan (骆晓娟, Luò Xiǎojuān, born 1984), Chinese épée fencer
- Luo Ying (骆赢; born 1991), Chinese badminton player
- Luo Xiaojuan (骆晓娟, born 1984), Chinese épée fencer
- Luo Jiacheng (骆嘉诚; born 1995), Chinese footballer currently playing as a midfielder for Kunshan
