= Loi Wai Long =

Macau footballer

Personal information
- Full name: Loi Wai Long
- Date of birth: September 27, 1989 (age 37)
- Place of birth: Macau
- Position: Defender

Senior career*
Years	Team	Apps	(Gls)
2007–2008	CD Heng Tai		
2010–	CD Monte Carlo		

International career^{‡}
2011–	Macau	2	(0)
Chinese name
Traditional Chinese	雷偉隆
Hanyu Pinyin	Léi Wěilóng
Yale Romanization	Lèuih Wáih-lùhng
Jyutping	Leoi4 Wai5-lung4
- * Club domestic league appearances and goals ‡ National team caps and goals as of 16 February 2013

Loi Wai Long is a Macau footballer who plays as a defender for the club CD Monte Carlo. He is the elder brother of Loi Wai Hong.
