= Yu (surname 于) =

Chinese family name

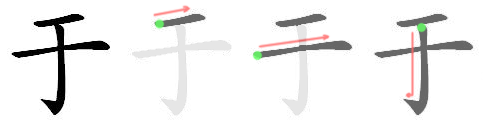
The character Yu with stroke order

Yu (Chinese: 于; pinyin: Yú; Jyutping: jyu4, jyu1) is a Chinese family name. According to the 2006 census of People's Republic of China, it ranks 38th nationally. In 2019 it was the 41st most common surname in mainland China. The name is transliterated as Vu in Vietnamese but is very rare in Vietnam. It is the 82nd name on the Hundred Family Surnames poem.

Note that even though the literary usage of the character 於 was simplified to 于 in simplified Chinese, the surname usages of 於 was unchanged, so both are recognized as distinct surnames in both simplified and traditional Chinese.

於 is the 203rd name on the Hundred Family Surnames. 375th-most common name shared by 0.0074% of the population or 99,000 people, with the province with the most being Jiangsu.

== Distribution ==
Of the top 30 cities in China, 于 ranked 9th most common in the cities of both Changchun and Harbin.

== History ==
The Yu (于) surname originated from the surname Ji (姬). According to history records, after Zhou Wu Wang (surname Ji) overthrew the Shang dynasty, he created many dukes. He gave his second son Yu Shu (邘叔) the Yu kingdom (邘国, in present Qinyang in Henan), whose descendants then acquired the surname Yu (于). The Yu lived in Kaifeng and Chenliu areas in Henan for a long period of time, becoming prominent families there. After the Tang (618-907AD) and Song (960-1127 AD) dynasties, Yu families started to move to Huiji (now in Shaoxing, Zhejiang Province).

== Notable people ==
=== 于 ===
- Yu Jin (于禁) military general under the warlord Cao Cao in the late Eastern Han dynasty
- Kaila Yu (于麗萍) Taiwanese American nude model and pop singer
- Ronny Yu (于仁泰) Chinese director, producer, and movie writer
- Yu Qian (于谦) Chinese Defence Minister of the Ming dynasty
- Yu So Chow (于素秋) Chinese actress
- Yu Lidi (于栗磾) a general of the Chinese/Xianbei dynasty, Northern Wei also known as Wuniuyu Lidi (勿忸于栗磾) and Duke of Xincheng (新城公)
- Yu Zhong (于忠) an official of the Chinese/Xianbei dynasty, Northern Wei also known as Wuniuyu Deng (勿忸于登) and Duke Wujing of Lingshou (靈壽武敬公)
- Yu Chenghui (于承惠), veteran Chinese martial artist, action choreographer and actor
- Yu Pinqing (于品卿), Vice-chairman of the Mongolian United Autonomous Government
- Yu Menglong (于朦胧, born 1988), also known as Alan Yu, is a Chinese actor, singer and music video director
- Kelly Yu Wenwen (于文文, born 1989) is a Chinese Canadian singer and actress.
- Yu Rongguang (Chinese: 于荣光; born 30 August 1958), also known as Ringo Yu, is a Chinese actor and martial artist who started his career in Hong Kong
- Yu Zheng (Chinese: 于正; pinyin: Yú Zhèng; born 28 February 1978) is a Chinese screenwriter and producer who is noted for Palace, which earned him a Best
- Yu Xiaoguang (Chinese: 于晓光; born 16 May 1981), also known as Ethan Yu, is a Chinese composer and actor. Yu is a former swimmer and sprint canoer. In 2006
- Yu Wenxia (Chinese: 于文霞; pinyin: Yú Wénxiá; born 6 August 1989) is a Chinese actress, television host, singer, model and beauty queen. She won Miss World
- Yi Yu (Chinese: 于怡), Chinese statistician
- Yu Zhongfu (Chinese: 于忠福; born July 1956) is a general of the People's Liberation Army Air Force (PLAAF) of China. Having served in the PLAAF for more
- Yu Zhong (于忠) (452–518), né Wuniuyu Qiannian (勿忸于千年), courtesy name Sixian (思賢), formally Duke Wujing of Lingshou (靈壽武敬公), was an official of the Northern Wei dynasty.
- Yu Zidi (于子迪; born 2012), is a Chinese swimmer.
- Yu Dabao (于大宝; pinyin: Yú Dàbǎo; born 18 April 1988) is a Chinese professional footballer who plays for Beijing Guoan in the Chinese Super League

=== 於 ===
- Yu Lihua (Chinese: 於梨華, 1929 – 2020) was a Chinese writer who authored over thirty works - novels, short stories, newspaper articles
- Yu Zhiying (Chinese: 於之莹; born 1997) is a Chinese professional go player
