= Lu Chengqing =

Tang dynasty official (595-670)

Lu Chengqing (Chinese: 盧承慶; 595–670), courtesy name Ziyu (子餘), formally Duke Ding of Fanyang (范陽定公), was a Chinese politician during the Tang dynasty, serving as chancellor during the reign of Emperor Gaozong.

== Background ==
Lu Chengqing was born in 595, during the reign of Emperor Wen of Sui. He was from "The elder house of northern ancestry" (北祖大房) of the prominent Lu clan of Fanyang. His grandfather Lu Sidao was an important official during the Sui dynasty. Late in the reign of Emperor Wen's son Emperor Yang, Lu Chengqing's father Lu Chisong (盧赤松) was serving as the magistrate of Hedong County (河東, in modern Yuncheng, Shanxi), when the general Li Yuan rebelled against Emperor Yang's rule at Taiyuan. Lu Chisong, who had previously known Li Yuan, surrendered as soon as Li Yuan's forces arrived and served on Li Yuan's staff. After Li Yuan established the Tang dynasty as its Emperor Gaozu, he created Lu Chisong the Duke of Fanyang. Lu Chengqing was said to be handsome and attentive to his appearance, but also knowledgeable and capable. When he was young, Lu Chisong died, and so he inherited the title of Duke of Fanyang.

== During Emperor Taizong's reign ==
Early in the reign of Emperor Gaozu's son and successor Emperor Taizong, Lu Chengqing was serving as the census officer for the commandant at Qin Prefecture (秦州, roughly modern Tianshui, Gansu), when he had an opportunity to report to Emperor Taizong the status of military affairs west of the Yellow River (i.e., in modern central Gansu). Emperor Taizong was impressed by the clarity of his report, and promoted him to be a low-level official at the ministry of civil service. He was later promoted to by the deputy minister of census. On one occasion, when Emperor Taizong asked about historical population counts, Lu discussed historical population counts all the way from the Xia dynasty and Shang dynasty, down to Tang's immediate predecessors Northern Zhou and Sui. Emperor Taizong was impressed, and soon made him the deputy minister of defense but further also made him in charge of civil service matters. Lu initially declined, stating, "Civil service matters should be in the hands of the minister of civil service, and for me to handle them would be to exceed my authorities." Emperor Taizong insisted, stating, "I trust you. Why do you not trust yourself?" He later also served as deputy secretary general of the capital prefecture, Yong Prefecture (雍州, roughly modern Xi'an, Shaanxi), and secretary general of the executive bureau of government (尚書省, Shangshu Sheng).

== During Emperor Gaozong's reign ==
Early in the reign of Emperor Taizong's son and successor Emperor Gaozong, who became emperor in 649 following Emperor Taizong's death, for reasons unknown, it was said that the powerful chancellor Chu Suiliang wrongly accused Lu Chengqing of faults. Lu was demoted to be the secretary general to the commandant at Yi Prefecture (益州, roughly modern Chengdu, Sichuan). Thereafter, Chu further accused Lu of misconduct while serving as the deputy secretary general at Yong Prefecture, and Lu was further demoted to be the military advisor to the prefect of Jian Prefecture (簡州, roughly modern Ziyang, Sichuan). After about a year, he was then made the secretary general of Hong Prefecture (洪州, roughly modern Nanchang, Jiangxi). On one occasion, when Emperor Gaozong was set to visit warm springs in Ru Prefecture (汝州, roughly modern Pingdingshan, Henan), he promoted Lu to be the prefect of Ru Prefecture, and soon recalled him to the capital to serve as director of vassal affairs. In 657, when the general Su Dingfang destroyed Western Tujue and captured its Shabuolüe Khan Ashina Helu (阿史那賀魯), it was Lu that Emperor Gaozong sent to Western Tujue lands to divide the lands between two Western Tujue princes loyal to Tang, Ashina Mishe (阿史那彌射), who was created the Xinxiwang Khan, and Ashina Buzhen (阿史那步真), who was created the Jiwangjue Khan. Emperor Gaozong further ordered Lu, along with Ashina Mishe and Ashina Buzhen, to grant the various tribal chiefs appropriate official titles.

As of 659, Lu was serving as the minister of treasury, when he was given the designation Canzhi Zhengshi (參知政事), making him a chancellor de facto. Later that year, when the former chancellor and Emperor Gaozong's uncle Zhangsun Wuji, who had already been exiled on suspicion of treason, was accused of further plotting, Lu, along with fellow chancellors Li Ji, Xu Jingzong, Xin Maojiang, and Ren Yaxiang were put in charge of the investigation (although it was Xu, who was an ally of Emperor Gaozong's powerful wife Empress Wu (later known as Wu Zetian), who drove the investigation), which resulted in Zhangsun's forced suicide. Yet later that year, Lu was given the designation of Tong Zhongshu Menxia Sanpin (同中書門下三品), a more honored designation for a chancellor de facto. However, in 660, he was accused of mishandling the ministry of treasury, and he was removed from his offices, and further was sent to Run Prefecture (潤州, roughly modern Zhenjiang, Jiangsu) to be its prefect. He was subsequently made the secretary general of Yong Prefecture and given the honorific title Yinqing Guanglu Daifu (銀青光祿大夫). In 669, he was made the minister of justice. He soon requested retirement on account of old age, and Emperor Gaozong agreed, further giving him the honorific title of Jinzi Guanglu Daifu (金紫光祿大夫).

Lu died in 670 and was buried with honors. Prior to his death, he gave this order to his sons:

Death and life are but part of the natural law, just like there are sunrise and sunset. After I die, bury me in my usual clothes. When you sacrifice to me, use usual foods and not large animals. Make my tomb just high enough to be recognizable, and not excessively large. Bury me as soon as it is appropriate, and do not use diviners to figure out which day is lucky. Use only pottery and lacquer items for my burial items. Bury me in only a coffin, not a second-layer outer coffin. The tombstone should just have my office titles and the years, not an exaggerated text.

== Family ==
=== Younger Brothers ===
- Lu Cheng'en (盧承恩)
- Lu Chengti (盧承悌)
- Lu Chengji (盧承基)
- Lu Chengye (盧承業)
- Lu Chengtai (盧承泰)
- Lu Chengli (盧承禮)
- Lu Chengfu (盧承福)

=== Sons ===
- According to New Book of Tang vol. 73, Lu Chengqing only had a son named Lu Xu (盧諝), who would serve as director of ministry of personnel (吏部郎中). Lu Xu had two sons: Lu Yun (盧鄖), prefect of Chu (滁州); Lu Yuan (盧垣), whose son Lu Youlin (盧幼臨) would serve as director of ministry of justice (刑部郎中).
