= Lei (surname) =

- Lei surname in regular script
- Pronunciation: Léi (Mandarin); Lûi (Hokkien)
- Language: Chinese

Origin
- Language: Chinese
- Origin: China
- Meaning: Thunder

Other names
- Variant forms: Lei (Mandarin); Lui, Leoi, Lei, Loi (Cantonese); Louie, Loui, Lui, Lei (Taishanese); Looi, Lui (Hokkien, Teochew, Hakka, Hainanese, Fuzhounese); Lūi (Gan)
- Derivatives: No, Ro (Korean); Lôi (Vietnamese)

Lei is the pinyin romanization of the Chinese surname 雷 (Léi). It is the 69th name on the Hundred Family Surnames poem.

Additionally, the very common Chinese surname Li (李) is pronounced Lei in Standard Cantonese, and is sometimes romanized as "Lei", particularly among the Macanese.

== Romanization ==
The surname is also romanized as Lui or Looi in Hokkien and Teochew; Lui, Looi, or Loi in Cantonese; Louie or Louis in Taishanese; Lūi in Gan.

Sino-Xenic pronunciations include Lôi in Vietnamese; Roe (뢰) or Noe (뇌) in Korean; and Rai in Japanese.

== Distribution ==
雷 is the 79th-most-common surname in mainland China but not included among the 100 most common surnames on Taiwan.

In the United States, Lei is an uncommon surname, ranking 14,849th during the 1990 census and 6,583rd during the year 2000 census. In order, "Roe", "Louis", "Noe", "Louie", and "Lui" were all more common than the pinyin name; Loi and Rai were quite uncommon; and Leoi was held by fewer than 100 US residents and left unlisted by the Census Bureau.

In Canada, Lei and Lui were among the 200 most common peculiarly Chinese-Canadian surnames found in a 2010 study by Baiju Shah & al, which data-mined the Registered Persons Database of Canadian health card recipients in the province of Ontario. Rai was found, but among the most common surnames of the Indian-Canadian community.

== Origin ==
雷 is the Chinese character for "thunder".

In Old Chinese, its pronunciation has been reconstructed as *C.rˤuj; and in Middle Chinese, as Lwoj.

== Persons with the surname ==
- Lei Toby (born 1994), Australian Rugby League Player Sydney Roosters & Hong Kong & Investment Banker
- Lei Chen (1897–1979), Taiwanese politician
- Lei Feng (1940–1962), Chinese soldier
- Lei Jiayin (born 1983), Chinese actor
- Lei Jieqiong (1905–2011), Chinese sociologist, activist, and politician
- Lei Jun (born 1969), Chinese billionaire entrepreneur, founder and CEO of Xiaomi
- Lei Sheng (born 1984), Chinese foil fencer
- Lei Tingjie (born 1997), Chinese chess player
- Lei Yanjun a.k.a. "Clifford Louie" (1914–1999), Chinese-American pilot and military officer in the Republic of China
- Lei Yixin (born 1954), Chinese sculptor
- Lei Zhengfu (born 1958), Chinese politician
- Lei Yan (born 1980), Chinese singer
- Lei Yingchuan (1957–1979), Chinese soldier
- Simon Lui Yu Yang (雷宇揚; 1964–2026), Hong Kong actor
- Simon Lui Zhaoheng (雷兆恆; born 1981), Singaporean academic and professor
- Lwi Kian Keong (born 1975), Malaysian politician

== See also ==
- The Hundred Family Surnames
- List of common Chinese surnames
