= Steven Gwon Sheng Louie =

American physicist

Steven Gwon Sheng Louie (26 March 1949, Taishan, Guangdong, China) is a computational condensed-matter physicist. He is a professor of physics at the University of California, Berkeley and senior faculty scientist in the Materials Sciences Division at Lawrence Berkeley National Laboratory, where his research focuses on nanoscience. He is also scientific director of the Theory of Nanostructured Materials Facility at the Molecular Foundry.

He was born in Taishan, Guangdong province, China in 1949 and moved to San Francisco when he was 10. His Chinese name is 雷干城 (pinyin: Léi Gānchéng). He received his PhD degree in 1976 from Berkeley, working with Professor Marvin L. Cohen.

== Honors ==
- 1986 Fellow of the American Physical Society
- 1996 Aneesur Rahman Prize for Computational Physics (American Physical Society)
- 1999 Davisson-Germer Prize in Surface Physics (American Physical Society)
- 2003 Richard P. Feynman Prize in Molecular Nanotechnology (Foresight Institute)
- 2005 Elected to the National Academy of Sciences
- 2009 Elected to the American Academy of Arts and Sciences
- 2015 Materials Theory Award (Materials Research Society)
- 2021 Elected as a Foreign Member of the Chinese Academy of Sciences
- 2025 Elected to the European Academy of Sciences and Arts
- 2025 Mildred Dresselhaus Prize in Nanoscience or Nanomaterials (American Physical Society)
