= Lu Huaishen =

Lu Huaishen (Chinese: 盧懷慎; died December 11, 716), posthumous name Count Wencheng of Yuyang (魚陽文成伯), was an official of the Tang and Wu Zhou dynasties of China. He served as a chancellor during the reign of Emperor Xuanzong. He was known for his honesty as an official, but was criticized both in his time and posterity for not making decisions of his own and simply yielding to his colleague Yao Chong.

== Background ==
It is not known when Lu Huaishen was born. He was from the "Third House of Northern Ancestry" (北祖第三房) of the prominent Lu clan of Fanyang. During Tang dynasty, Lu Huaishen's grandfather Lu Zhe (盧悊) served as the magistrate of Lingchang County (靈昌, in modern Anyang, Henan), and thus relocated his family to Lingchang. Lu Huaishen's father Lu Ting (盧挺) served as an official at Tan Prefecture (roughly modern Changsha, Hunan).

Lu Huaishen was said to be highly intelligent as a child, and he impressed his father's friend, the imperial censor (御史) Han Siyan (韓思彥). It was said that he was careful with his behavior when he was young, and after he passed the imperial examinations, he served as Jiancha Yushi (監察御史), a low-level imperial censor, probably during Wu Zetian's reign.

== During Emperor Zhongzong's second reign ==
In 705, Wu Zetian was overthrown in a coup by her chancellor Zhang Jianzhi, and her son Li Xian the Crown Prince, a former emperor, returned to the throne (as Emperor Zhongzong). His reign was one where the civil service system was heavily influenced by powerful individuals, and Lu Huaishen, who served as a chief deputy censor (御史中丞, Yushi Zhongcheng) during this time, made repeated petitions for civil service reforms, which Emperor Zhongzong did not accept. In 706, when Emperor Zhongzong sent officials to examine the 10 circuits the realm was divided into, Lu was one of the officials sent. Lu was eventually promoted to be Huangmen Shilang (黃門侍郎), the deputy head of the examination bureau of government (門下省, Menxia Sheng), and he was created the Count of Yuyang (渔阳伯).

== During Emperor Ruizong's second reign ==
In 710, Emperor Zhongzong died suddenly—a death that traditional historians believed was a poisoning by his powerful wife Empress Wei and daughter Li Guo'er the Princess Anle. Emperor Zhongzong's son by a concubine, Li Chongmao the Prince of Wen, was made emperor (as Emperor Shang), with Empress Wei serving as empress dowager and regent. A month later, Emperor Zhongzong's sister Princess Taiping and nephew Li Longji the Prince of Linzi rose in rebellion (唐隆之变, Tanglong incident) and killed Empress Dowager Wei and Li Guo'er. They supported Li Longji's father Li Dan the Prince of Xiang and younger brother of Li Xian, himself a former emperor, and Li Dan returned to the throne (as Emperor Ruizong). Lu was made deputy minister of defense (兵部侍郎, Bingbu Shilang), serving under the minister Yao Yuanzhi, and it was said that the military promotion system was reformed during this time under Yao, him, and fellow deputy minister Lu Xiangxian.

== During Emperor Xuanzong's reign ==
In 712, Emperor Ruizong passed the throne to Li Longji, who took the throne as Emperor Xuanzong. Around this time, Lu Huaishen was again Huangmen Shilang, and he, along with Wei Zhigu, were in charge of selecting officials at the eastern capital Luoyang. In 713, after Yao Yuanzhi (by this point using the name Yao Chong) became chancellor, Yao managed to have fellow chancellors Zhang Shuo and Liu Youqiu removed from chancellor positions. In their stead, Lu was given the designation Tong Ziwei Huangmen Pingzhangshi (同紫微黃門平章事), making him a chancellor de facto. In 714, he was made Huangmen Jian (黃門監), the head of the examination bureau (which by this point had been renamed Huangmen Sheng (黃門省)) and a post considered one for a chancellor. It was said that as Lu believed himself to be not as capable as Yao, he always yielded to Yao's opinion—and that, on one occasion, when Yao was on leave due to the death of one of his sons, many important matters stacked up because Lu did not know how to rule on them and was forced to inform Emperor Xuanzong of this. Emperor Xuanzong responded, "I give important matters to Yao Chong, and I put you in a position that can be eliminated." The people at the time satirized the situation by referring to Lu as "the chancellor who just ate as the secondary guest" (伴食宰相, Banshi Zaixiang). However, he was credited, along with Yao, with reforming the civil service system and the criminal justice system, to eliminate corruption and unfairness.

In 715, he was, in addition to Huangmen Jian, given the additional office as minister of civil service affairs (吏部尚書, Libu Shangshu). It was said that he was careful and frugal, and that he spent his salaries on helping others—so much so that even his family at times went hungry, and his house was in disrepair. Later in 715, when there was a major locust infestation, Yao advocated a campaign of extermination, which Lu initially opposed, believing that this would bring discord in the cosmos, but Yao persisted and was able to get the extermination campaign carried out. When Emperor Xuanzong wanted a scholar to assist him in his studies, Lu recommended Ma Huaisu (馬懷素) the minister of worship.

In 716, when Guo Qianguan (郭乾瓘) the commander (jiedushi) of Longyou Circuit (隴右, headquartered in modern Haidong Prefecture, Qinghai), petitioned to have eight of his servants, whom he cited for contributions in a military campaign, made generals, Emperor Xuanzong was initially set to approve the commission. Lu, however, opposed it, pointing out that having servants promoted to such high positions was against regulations, and Emperor Xuanzong agreed and stopped the commissions.

Later in 716, Lu grew ill and requested to resign. His resignation was approved, but he died the same day. Before his death, he wrote a petition recommending a number of officials who had been previously demoted because of minor offenses—Song Jing, Li Jie (李傑), Li Chaoyin (李朝隱), and Lu Chongyuan (盧從愿) -- be repromoted, and Emperor Xuanzong, after Lu's death, restored those officials. It was said that after his death, there was no savings at his household, and one of his old servants offered to sell himself into slavery to pay for Lu's proper burial. The imperial scholar Zhang Xing (張星) submitted a petition pointing out Lu's honesty and contributions, and Emperor Xuanzong, in response, awarded silk and grain to his household. The next year, when Emperor Xuanzong returned from a visit to Luoyang, he happened to go by Lu's house when he saw that Lu was being offered sacrifices, but the ceremony was very simple and lacking in supplies, and also that Lu's tombstone had not been properly written, he awarded Lu's family with silk and had the chancellor Su Ting write the epitaph on Lu's tombstone. Lu's sons Lu Huan (盧奐) and Lu Yi (盧弈) later served as key officials late in Emperor Xuanzong's reign, and his grandson Lu Qi served as a chancellor during the reign of Emperor Xuanzong's great-grandson Emperor Dezong.

== Posthumous fame ==
Song dynasty historian Sima Guang and Ji Bingxuan, a politician of the People's Republic of China, praised Lu Huaishen for his willingness to compromise. Sima and Ji both argue that by yielding to the authority of chancellor Yao Chong, who was more competent, Lu facilitated the works emperor Xuanzong's court. Instead of competing with Yao, Lu was aware of his limits and contributed to the well-being of the country in his own way.

== Notes and references ==
- Old Book of Tang, vol. 98.
- New Book of Tang, vol. 126.
- Zizhi Tongjian, vols. 208, 210, 211.
