= Shan (surname) =

Shan (simplified Chinese: 单; traditional Chinese: 單; pinyin: Shàn) is a Chinese surname. The origin of this surname is not clear. One explanation is that it came from Shan County in Shandong province. Another possible origin involves King Cheng of Zhou's youngest son's acquisition of the name when he was given what would become the Shan state when the enfeoffment system was enacted during the Zhou dynasty. The Shan state existed for a few hundred years before it was annexed by a stronger neighbouring state. It was located in present-day Jiyuan, Henan province. Although the surname comes from the place name, the Shan family was a branch of the royal family of the Zhou dynasty. Its ancient origin determines its rareness and not many people have the Shan surname. According to one unverifiable estimate, about 150,000 people are of the surname.

Shan could also be used to refer to the rare surname 𢒉. The rare character was unable to be rendered on a computer so people chose Xian 冼 to replace it. People from Gaozhuang Village born after the system change and people who didn't want a hassle with technology were affected. The choice was controversial as some people saw that future generations would forget their name.

Most of people of the Shan surname live in Shandong, Henan and Hebei. However, some people bearing the Shan surname can be found in Taiwan and overseas Chinese communities throughout the world.

Some Mandarin-speaking peoples adopted "Shan" as their surname; its pronunciation in Cantonese is "Seen"（the Cantonese pronunciation is as same as the word "善”，which means kind in english） and often transliterated as "Sin". Some Manchu and Hui people choose "Shan" as their family name, but their population is small. Majority of the Shan are Han Chinese and they can trace their origin to the Zhou dynasty.

The character 单/單 is also pronounced pinyin: dān when not a surname.

== Notable people with the surname Shan ==
- Shan Xiongxin (單雄信; 581–621), a general of the Transition from Sui to Tang period.
- Shan Zhongsheng (單仲升), who lived in the Yuan dynasty. He is known for his filial piety.
- Pal Sinn (單立文, Shan Liwen; born 1959), a Hong Kong singer and actor.
- Shan Tianfang (單田芳; 1934–2018), a pingshu performer.
- Sin Chung-kai (單仲偕, Shan Zhongkai; born 1960), a Hong Kong politician.
- Zen Wai-chu (單慧珠; Shan Huizhu), a Hong Kong film director.
- Shan Zhiqiang (單之薔), former editor-in-chief of National Geographic in China.
- Paul Shan Kuo-hsi (單國璽, Shan Guoxi; 1923–2012), a Taiwanese bishop.
- Shan Fuliang (單富良), a history professor at the Grand Valley State University and former president of the Chinese Historians in the United States (CHUS).

== Fictional characters with the surname ==
- Shan-Yu, the leader of the Huns and the main antagonist and character in the 1998 Walt Disney Animation Studios Princess animated film Mulan
- Shan Tinggui (單廷珪), a fictional character and one of the 108 heroes in the classical novel Water Margin.
- The Shan family, a fictional family in the Star Wars Legends continuity
  - Bastila Shan, a Jedi who appears in the Star Wars: Knights of the Old Republic video game duology
  - Satele Shan, another Jedi and descendant of Bastila, appearing in the MMORPG Star Wars: The Old Republic
