= Lu (surname 陸) =

Chinese surname with character 陆/陸 (pinyin: Lù)

Lù (陆/陸)
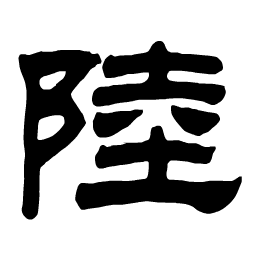
- Pronunciation: Lù (Mandarin); Luk (Cantonese); Lek (Teochew)
- Language: Chinese

Origin
- Language: Old Chinese

Other names
- Variant forms: Luk, Lek, Leck, Leok, Loke, Look, Luke, Loh
- Derivatives: Lục, Lu (Vietnamese), Yuk (Korean), Lek (Thai)

Lu is the pinyin and Wade–Giles romanization of the Chinese surname written 陆 in simplified character and 陸 in traditional character. It is also spelled Luk or Loke according to the Hong Kong Cantonese pronunciation. Lu 陆 is the 61st most common surname in China, shared by 4.2 million people. Most people with the surname live in southern China; 44% live in just two provinces: Jiangsu and Guangxi. Lu 陸 is listed 198th in the Song dynasty classic text Hundred Family Surnames.

== Demographics ==
As of 2013, Lu 陆 is the 61st most common surname in China. It is shared by 4.2 million people, or 0.33% of the Chinese population. Lu 陆 is predominantly a southern surname. Jiangsu province has the highest number of Lu's, accounting for 23% of the national total. Guangxi is a close second, with 21%. Guangdong, Shanghai, Zhejiang, Guizhou, and Anhui, all southern provinces, account for another 33%. Lu 陆 is the 6th most common surname in Guangxi's capital and largest city of Nanning and the 10th most common name in Shanghai.

== Origins ==
According to tradition, there are three main sources of the Lu 陆 surname:

1. From Luzhong (陆终), a great-great-grandson of the legendary emperor Zhuanxu. Luzhong's father Wuhui (吴回) was put in charge of fire by Emperor Ku and given the title of Zhu Rong. Luzhong's clan migrated to Pinglu County, Shanxi, and later moved to Pinglu of Shandong, in present-day Wenshang County.

2. From Luhun (陆浑), a tribe of the Rong nomads who established a state in modern Song County, Henan. In 525 BC, Luhun was annexed by the State of Jin, a major power during the Spring and Autumn period. Many of the Luhun people adopted Lu as their surname.

3. From the Tian (Chen) lineage of the Gui clan (妫), the ruling family of the State of Chen during the Spring and Autumn period. Chen Wan (later called Tian Wan), a prince of Chen, escaped to the State of Qi after losing a power struggle in his home state. Tian Wan's descendants prospered in Qi and eventually usurped the throne of the kingdom, which became known as Tian Qi. During the Warring States period, King Xuan of Qi enfeoffed his youngest son Tian Tong at Lu 陆 (in modern Laoling, Shandong), which was named after a branch of the Luzhong clan. Tian Tong's descendants adopted Lu as their surname.

== Later adoption ==
During the Xianbei Northern Wei dynasty, Emperor Xiaowen (reigned 467–499 AD) implemented a drastic policy of sinicization, ordering his own people to adopt Chinese surnames. The Bulugu (步陆孤) tribe of Xianbei adopted Lu as their surname. The Xianbei people have since completely assimilated into the Han Chinese. The Xianbei Lu later became highly prosperous. Out of the four most prominent Lu 陆 clans in history, which were based in the commanderies of Henan, Henei, Pingyuan, and Wu, two (Henan and Henei) traced their ancestry to the Bulugu tribe.

== Notable people ==
- Lu Gu (陸賈; 240–170 BC), Western Han politician and Confucian scholar
- Lu Xun (Three Kingdoms) (陸遜; 183–245), Eastern Wu general and politician
- Lu Mao (陸瑁; died 239), Eastern Wu politician, Lu Xun's younger brother
- Lu Ji (Gongji) (陸績; 187–219), Eastern Wu official, one of The Twenty-four Filial Exemplars
- Lu Kai (陸凱; 198–269), Eastern Wu politician
- Lu Kang (Three Kingdoms) (陸抗; 226–274), Eastern Wu general, Lu Xun's son
- Lu Ji (Shiheng) (陸機; 261–303), Eastern Wu and Western Jin writer and politician, son of Lu Kang
- Lu Dunxin (陸敦信), Tang dynasty chancellor
- Lu Xiangxian (陸象先; 665–736), Tang dynasty chancellor
- Lu Yu (陸羽; 733–804), Tang dynasty writer, author of The Classic of Tea
- Lu Zhi (Tang dynasty) (陸贄; 754–805), Tang dynasty chancellor
- Lu Yi (陸扆; 847–905), Tang dynasty chancellor
- Lu Guimeng (陸龜蒙; died 881), Tang dynasty poet
- Lu You (陸游; 1125–1209), Southern Song dynasty poet
- Lu Jiuyuan (陸九淵; 1139–1192), Southern Song philosopher
- Lu Xiufu (陸秀夫; 1236–1279), Southern Song chancellor and patriot
- Lu Rong (陸容; 1436–1494), Ming dynasty official and scholar
- Lu Cai (陸采; 1497–1537), Ming dynasty playwright
- Imperial Noble Consort Qinggong, or Lady Lu (1724–1774) imperial consort from the Qing dynasty
- Lu Jianying (陸建瀛; died 1853), Qing dynasty governor
- Loke Yew (陸佑; Lu You; 1845–1917), Malayan businessman and philanthropist
- Lu Rongting (陸榮廷; 1856–1927), Qing dynasty general, and warlord in the Republican period
- Lu Haodong (陸皓東; 1868–1895), late Qing dynasty revolutionary
- Look Tin Eli (陸潤卿, aka Look Tin Sing, Luk Tin-Sun; 1870–1919), successful businessman in San Francisco
- Lu Zhengxiang (陸徵祥; 1871–1949), twice served as Premier of Taiwan
- Lu Zongyu (陸宗輿; 1876–1941), diplomat
- Lu Ruiguang (陆瑞光; 1901–1937), revolutionary
- Lu Xiaoman (陆小曼; 1903–1965), painter
- Keye Luke (陸錫麒; 1904–1991), American actor
- Lu Dingyi (陆定一; 1906–1996), politician
- Loke Wan Tho (陆运涛; Lu Yuntao; 1915–1964), founder of the Cathay Organisation
- Wing Luke (陸榮昌; 1925–1965), American politician
- Lu Jiaxi (陆家羲; 1935–1983), mathematician
- Lu Xiaoya (陸小雅; born 1941), actor, scriptwriter, and director
- Lu Youquan (陆有铨; 1943–2019), education scholar
- Lu Bing (陆兵; born 1944), politician
- Lu Hao (陆浩; born 1947), Communist Party official and administrator
- Christine Loh (陸恭蕙; Lu Gonghui; born 1956), Hong Kong legislator
- Lu Yi-ching (陸弈靜; Lu Yijing; born 1960), Taiwanese actress
- Yadong Luo (陆亚东; Lu Yadong; born 1963), Chinese-American international business professor, scholar and author
- Qi Lu (computer scientist) (陆奇; Lu Qi; born 1961), computer programmer and executive
- Lu Hao (born 1967) (陆昊; born 1967), Governor of Heilongjiang province
- Lu Chuan (陆川; born 1971), filmmaker and screenwriter
- Lu Yi (actor) (陆毅; born 1976), actor and singer
- Lu Li (陆莉; born 1976), gymnast
- Loke Siew Fook or Anthony Loke (陆兆福; born 1977), Malaysian politician
- Luk Koon Pong (陸冠邦; Lu Guanbang; born 1978), Hong Kong football player
- Lu Bofei (陆博飞; born 1979), football player
- Sharon Luk (陸詩韻; Luk Sze-wan; born 1980), Hong Kong actress
- Lu Feng (footballer) (陆峰; born 1981), football player
- Lu Yong (陆永; born 1986), weightlifter
- Michael Luk (陸志豪; Lu Zhihao; born 1986), Hong Kong-born Canadian football player
- Lu Chunlong (陆春龙; born 1989), gymnast
- Victoria Loke (陆詠怡; born 1992), Singaporean actress
- Lu Ting (陆婷; born 1992), Chinese singer, actress, and member of Chinese idol group SNH48
- Marie Lu, (陸希未; born 1984), Chinese-American author
