= Lue railway station =

Former railway station in New South Wales, Australia

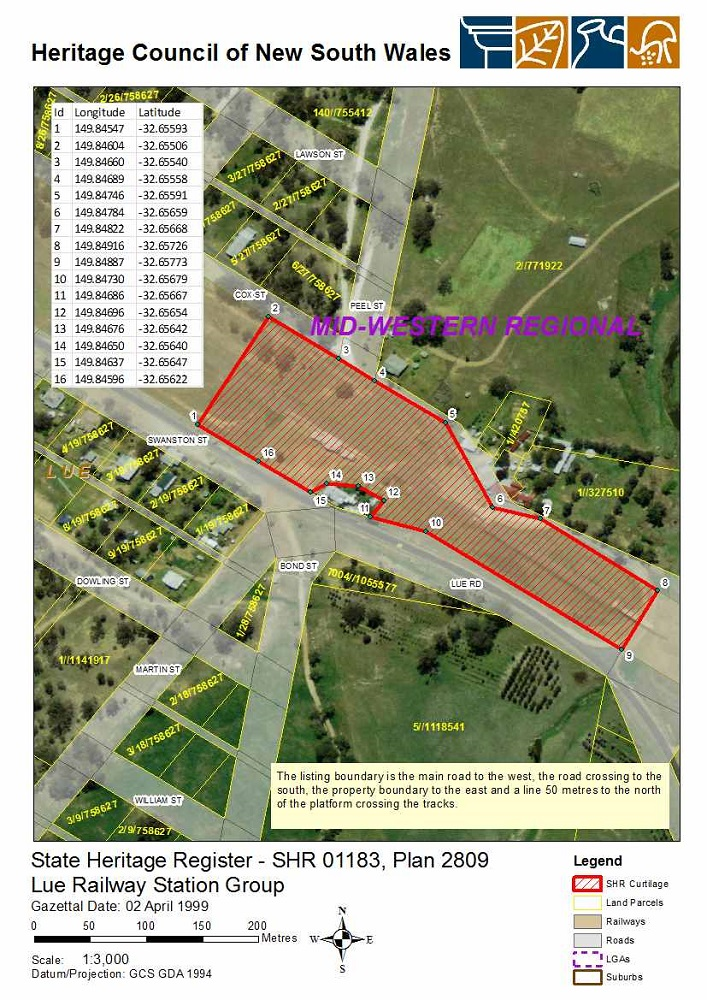
- Heritage boundaries

- Location within New South Wales Location within Australia
- 32.6554°S 149.8456°E
- Location: Wallerawang-Gwabegar railway, Lue, Mid-Western Regional Council, New South Wales, Australia

Site notes
- Owner: Transport Asset Holding Entity

New South Wales Heritage Register
- Official name: Lue Railway Station group
- Type: state heritage (complex / group)
- Designated: 2 April 1999
- Reference no.: 1183
- Type: Railway Platform/ Station
- Category: Transport - Rail

Lue railway station is a heritage-listed former railway station on the Gwabegar railway line at Lue, Mid-Western Regional Council, New South Wales, Australia. It was added to the New South Wales State Heritage Register on 2 April 1999.

== History ==
Lue railway station opened on 10 September 1884 along with the extension of the railway from Rylstone to Mudgee. Passenger services were suspended from 2 December 1985 and the station formally closed from 18 March 1986, although freight services along the section of line continued until 1992. The line through Lue reopened for freight services on 2 September 2000; although the station itself was repainted by locals in preparation, it remained closed and boarded up, and all services on the section of line were suspended again on 30 June 2007.

== Description ==
The station complex consists of a brick station building in a type 4 standard roadside third-class design with a brick platform, completed in 1884, and a concrete panel signal box in a type 5 design, completed in 1920.

The station formerly had a dock platform on the down end for unloading wagons and a loop line siding opposite the station for stockyard purposes.

== Heritage listing ==
Lue is an excellent small third class standard country station group with the main elements of station and residence intact. It is well sited and prominent from the main Mudgee road forming a significant element in the landscape and the understanding of the railways operation in the area. The buildings are of high quality and are good representative examples of their type. They indicate the importance of the location in the past for freight and passenger traffic and form an important link between the large Rylstone railway station and Mudgee railway station complexes, illustrating the range of sizes of buildings used at locations of varying importance. It is also in contrast to the smaller but similar design used at Capertee on the same section of line.

Lue railway station was listed on the New South Wales State Heritage Register on 2 April 1999 having satisfied the following criteria.

The place possesses uncommon, rare or endangered aspects of the cultural or natural history of New South Wales.

This item is assessed as historically rare. This item is assessed as arch. rare. This item is assessed as socially rare.
