= Lei Zhengfu =

Chinese politician

- 雷政富
- Born: July 1958 (age 67); Changshou County, Chongqing, China
- Occupation: Politician
- Criminal charge: Bribery
- Criminal penalty: Sentenced to 13 years

Lei Zhengfu (Chinese: 雷政富; pinyin: Léi Zhèngfù; born July 1958) is a former Chinese politician who served as Communist Party Secretary of Beibei District, Chongqing municipality. He was dismissed from his position a few days after a sex video recorded in 2007 became popular online via the popular microblog service Sina Weibo.

On November 20, 2012, a series of hotel room sex screenshots titled "Lei, the secretary who accepts sex bribes", were published on a personal website called "Civil Supervision". Lei Zhengfu was the Beibei District of Chongqing Party Secretary at the time. A few hours later, these screenshots started to go viral through microblogs. Sixty-three hours after the screenshots first went online, on November 23, Chongqing Municipal People's Government information office official made an announcement that the government had proved the male shown in the video was Lei, who will be removed from his position. This case is believed to be a result of “Network supervision by public opinion".

== Timeline ==
After the conclusion of the 18th Party Congress in China, on November 20, 2012, Zhu Ruifeng posted the screen shot on his website “Civil Supervision”; Xu Jiguang, a former investigative journalist later posted it on his personal microblog. Because of the popularity of microblogs in China, people started to pay attention; the number of hits to the Civil Supervision blog dramatically increased, reaching more than 20 million.

This phenomenon drew the attention of other media, and they began to interview Lei, who commented that the “promiscuous video is deceitful”. On November 23, the press office of the Chongqing municipal government issued a microblog stating that the Chongqing Municipal Commission for Discipline Inspection, in charge of enforcing party discipline, had taken note of the content of the video and was verifying its authenticity. On November 23, an official at the press office made an announcement on microblog, saying that the government had verified that the male shown in the video was Lei himself, who will be removed from his position.

Overall, from the release of the screenshot on the Civil Supervision Website to the final decision of removing of Lei Zhengfu from his official position took only 63 hours. And it is believed to be one of the quickest responses of an investigation into official abuse.

This scandal has exposed not only the corruption of Lei Zhengfu, but also the builder who sent girls as 'presents' to this official. This video was made by the mistress of the official, who was sent by a builder. Lei Zhengfu had the official power to sign the lease. So in order to get the land lease contract, the builder sent girl to him, and trained the girl to secretly shoot the sex video. The builder used the video to blackmail Lei. After taping this video, instead of threatening Lei, the builder made friends with him.

In 2009, the property developer let others use this video to threaten Lei, who confessed his “romantic relation” to his supervisor. After the investigation, both the mistress and builder were arrested under the “Sike Seal Crime”. Lei was protected and was promoted few months later to be the Beibei District Party Secretary. During those three years, the video was kept secret.

== Result ==
Lei was sentenced to 13 years in jail for taking more than 3.1 million yuan ($500,000) in bribes, and was incarcerated at Jiulong Prison of Chongqing until his release on January 25, 2024.

== Social media ==
In this “63 anti-corruption”, the power of social media is embraced by many media analysts. Before the Lei scandal, there had been similar scandals with investigations ranging from one month to half a year before punishment occurred. However, this time, within less than three days, a corrupt official was removed and under official investigation.

Media experts believe that the internet and especially social media have become an important tool in the fight against Chinese official corruption.

== See also ==
- Corruption in the People's Republic of China
- Sextortion
