= Van Looy =

Van Looy is a Dutch toponymic surname. Notable people with the surname include:

- Bent Van Looy (born 1976), Belgian pop singer and songwriter
- Erik Van Looy (born 1962), Belgian film director
- Frans Van Looy (1950–2019), Belgian cyclist
- Jacobus van Looy (1855–1930), Dutch painter and writer
- Lucas Van Looy (born 1941), Belgian Catholic bishop
- Rik Van Looy (1933–2024), Belgian cyclist
- Sander van Looy (born 1997), Dutch football defender

== See also ==
- Van Loo, Dutch surname with a similar origin
