= Lou (surname 娄) =

Chinese family name

Lou (娄/婁)
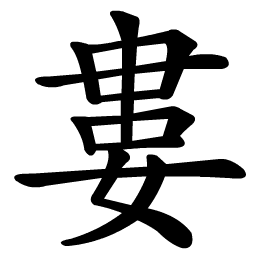
- Pronunciation: Lóu (Mandarin)
- Language: Chinese

Origin
- Language: Old Chinese

Lóu is the pinyin romanization of the Chinese surname written 娄 in simplified character and 婁 in traditional character. It is the 229th most common surname in China, shared by approximately 350,000 people. Lou 娄 is listed 139th in the Song dynasty classic text Hundred Family Surnames.

== Demographics ==
As of 2008, Lou 娄 is the 229th most common surname in China, with a population of approximately 350,000, or 0.028% of the total Chinese population. Guizhou province has the largest number of people with the surname, accounting for 23% of the total. It is followed by Shandong, Henan, and Hebei provinces, which account for another 33% of Lous.

== Origins ==
According to tradition, there are two main sources of the Lou 娄 surname:

1. From the State of Qǐ (杞). King Wu of Zhou enfeoffed Duke Donglou at Qi (modern Qi County, Kaifeng, Henan). The state was later moved to Shandong and destroyed by King Hui of Chu. The nobles of Qi were then enfeoffed at Lou (in modern Zhucheng, Shandong), and their descendants adopted Lou as their surname. This source of Lou began around 400 BC, and is a branch of Si, the ducal surname of Qi.

2. From the state of Zhulou, also called Zhu or Zou, in modern Zou County, Shandong. During the middle Warring States period, the state was annexed by King Xuan of Chu. The people of the state adopted Zhu, Zou, or Lou as their surnames. This source of Lou began around 300 BC, and is a branch of Cao, the surname of the ruling clan of Zhulou.

== Later adoption ==
During the Eastern Han dynasty, there was a people in the Min Mountains called Lou. They later mixed with the Han Chinese and adopted Lou as their surname. This is the main source of the Lou surname in Guizhou and Hunan provinces.

During the Xianbei Northern Wei dynasty, Emperor Xiaowen (reigned 467–499 AD) implemented a drastic policy of sinicization, ordering his own people to adopt Chinese surnames. The Pilou 匹娄, Yilou 伊娄, and Yinalou 乙那娄 tribes of Xianbei adopted Lou 娄 as their surname. This is the main source of the Lou surname in Henan province.

== Prominent clans ==
The most prominent clan of the Lou 娄 surname is that of the Qiao Commandery (谯郡, present-day Bozhou, Anhui), which was founded by Lou Shide, a famous chancellor of the Tang dynasty. His younger brother was also a high-ranking official, serving as the prefect of Dai Prefecture.

The Shanghai Library has in its collection five genealogy books of Lou-surnamed lineages. Nine other genealogy books are known to be in the collection of other institutions in China and the United States.

== Notable people ==
- Lou Jing (婁敬; fl. 200 BC), renamed Liu Jing after successfully recommending the removal of the Han capital from Luoyang to Chang'an, Han dynasty official and proponent of the heqin policy
- Lou Zhaojun (婁昭君; 501–562), Empress Dowager of the Northern Qi dynasty, of Xianbei ethnicity
- Lou Shide (婁師德; 630–699), Tang dynasty chancellor
- Lou Qinjian (娄勤俭; born 1956), governor of Shaanxi province
- Lou Ye (娄烨; born 1965), "sixth-generation" film director
- Lou Zhenggang (婁正綱; born 1966), artist
- Lou Yixiao (娄艺潇; born 1988), actress
- Lou Jing (娄婧; born 1989), African American-Chinese talent show contestant
