= Lou Jing =

Chinese soldier, advisor, and noble (fl. 200 BC)

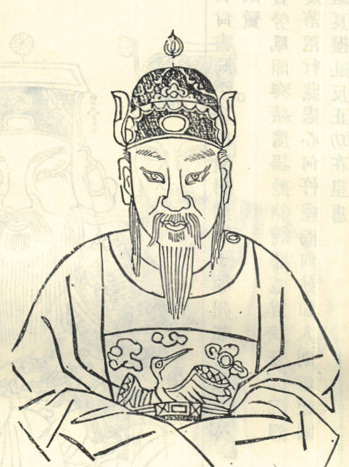
- Qing-era portrait of Lou Jing in hanfu with a mandarin square and guan
- Traditional Chinese: 婁敬
- Simplified Chinese: 娄敬
Transcriptions
Standard Mandarin
- Hanyu Pinyin: Lóu Jìng
- Wade–Giles: Lou Ching

Liu Jing
- Traditional Chinese: 劉敬
- Simplified Chinese: 刘敬
Transcriptions
Standard Mandarin
- Hanyu Pinyin: Liú Jìng
- Wade–Giles: Liu Ching

Lord Fengchun
- Chinese: 奉春君
Transcriptions
Standard Mandarin
- Hanyu Pinyin: Fèngchūn Jūn
- Wade–Giles: Fêng-ch'un Chün

Marquis of Jianxin
- Chinese: 建信侯
Transcriptions
Standard Mandarin
- Hanyu Pinyin: Jiànxìn Hóu
- Wade–Giles: Chien-hsin Hou

The Western Han and its vassal kingdoms c. 195 BC. The Xiongnu inhabited the eastern expanse of the Eurasian steppe to the empire's northwest.

Lou Jing (fl. 200 BC), also known as Liu Jing, was a soldier, advisor, noble, and diplomat under the early Western Han dynasty.

== Life ==
Lou Jing was a native of Qi, present-day Shandong, who served as a soldier during the Chu–Han Contention following the Fall of Qin. Immediately after the establishment of the Han dynasty in 202 BC, he was assigned to garrison duty in Longxi in eastern Gansu. When passing Luoyang, he saw his countryman General Yu, put down his cart, and requested an audience with the emperor Liu Bang (posthumously known as the Han Emperor Gaozu). Appearing before the emperor in his coarse clothes, he politely remonstrated him on the inappropriateness of restoring Luoyang as his capital, owing both to the enduring legacy of Eastern Zhou weakness and its relative exposure to attack. Many of Liu Bang's ministers, being eastern Chinese themselves, responded with arguments for the suitability of Luoyang. When the general Zhang Liang affirmed Lou's complaints with his own criticism, however, Liu Bang ordered the removal of the Han court to the Guanzhong Region. The city that grew up around his initial palace at Changle became known as Chang'an.

Lou Jing was promoted to the aristocracy with the title Lord Fengchun, granted use of the imperial surname Liu, and subsequently served as an imperial advisor.

During the rebellion of Han Xin, Lou Jing dissented from the analysis of the other envoys to the Xiongnu, arguing that they were hiding their strength and that the Han should avoid conflict with them. The emperor initially imprisoned him at Guanwu in annoyance, only to free him and apologize after the near disastrous 200 BC Battle of Baideng in northern Shanxi. Ten of the envoys were executed and Lou Jing was created Marquis of Jianxin.

Subsequently, Lou Jing was credited as establishing the Han policy of heqin ("marriage alliance") with the Xiongnu after he proposed wedding Liu Bang's eldest daughter to the Xiongnu chief Modu Chanyu rather than continue needless war with the nomadic tribes of the steppe to China's northwest. The Empress Lü was able to prevent the departure of her own children, but the emperor sent other members of his family rather than imposters as a good-faith measure during a treaty negotiated by Lou in 198 BC.

He also advised the emperor to limit the danger of the former ruling houses of the Warring States by settling their primary heirs in Chang'an, away from their independent power bases. Calling this "a policy of strengthening the root while weakening the branches" (強本弱末之術, qiáng běn ruò mò zhī shù), he also felt it would help protect the new capital against further incursion by the Xiongnu. Liu Bei adopted the proposal, moving around 100,000 of the eastern elite to the Guanzhong Region.

== Works ==
The bibliography section of the Book of Han lists Lou Jing as the author of a lost work called the Liu Jing, three chapters long.
