= Wonci Lui =

American actress (1930–2023)

- Born: July 3, 1930
- Died: June 16, 2023 (aged 92); Honolulu, Hawaii, U.S.
- Spouse: Thomas Yee

Yul Wonci Lui (July 3, 1930 – June 16, 2023) was an American actress and dancer of Chinese ancestry. She performed in Kismet, as an Arabian dancer in the number "Not Since Ninevah." She performed in the Rodgers and Hammerstein production Flower Drum Song from 1958 to 1960, as well as various productions of The King and I. Lui died in Honolulu, Hawaii on June 16, 2023, at the age of 92.
