= Okcheon Yuk clan =

Korean clan from North Chungcheong Province

- Country: Korea
- Current region: Okcheon County
- Founder: Yuk Bo
- Connected members: Yuk Young-soo; Yook Sung-jae

Okcheon Yuk clan (Korean: 옥천 육씨; Hanja: 沃川 陸氏) is a Korean clan. Their Bon-gwan is in Okcheon County, North Chungcheong Province. According to research done in 2015, Okcheon Yuk clan members numbered 22,593. Their founder was Yuk Bo, who was from Zhejiang. He was settled and naturalized in Silla from the Tang dynasty in 927.

== See also ==
- Korean clan names of foreign origin
