= Lue, New South Wales =

Lue
- Town
- Coordinates: 32°40′0″S 149°51′0″E
- Country: Australia
- State: New South Wales
- LGA: Mid-Western Regional Council
- Location: 265 km (165 mi) NW of Sydney; 125 km (78 mi) N of Bathurst, New South Wales; 28 km (17 mi) E of Mudgee

Government
  - State electorate: Bathurst, Orange, Upper Hunter
  - Federal division: Parkes

Population
  - Total: 216 (2021 census)
- Postcode: 2850

Lue is a small village in New South Wales, Australia. At the 2021 census, Lue had a population of 216.

The town's name comes from the Wiradjuri word Loowee, meaning chain of waterholes.

Lue is located on the now-closed Gwabegar railway line between the larger towns of Rylstone and Mudgee, about 20 kilometres (12 mi) south-east of Mudgee. It is not on the main road, but the NSW TrainLink bus services from Gulgong detours several times a week to service Lue.

Lue was prosperous after the opening of the railway to Mudgee in 1884, but declined from the 1930s. In 1921, leases taken up at the locality of Barigan and plans made to erect oil share retorts there; the oil that would have been produced was planned to be pumped through a pipeline to Lue railway station.

Lue Hotel and Lue Pottery are businesses still in operation. The Lue railway station still exists and is heritage listed.

A few kilometres from Lue on the Mudgee Road lies the historic Havilah homestead with its adjoining Havilah Memorial Church.

== School ==
- Lue Public School

== Churches ==
- Our Lady of Lourdes Catholic Church
- St Luke's Anglican Church

== Heritage listings ==
Lue has a number of heritage-listed sites, including:

- Wallerawang-Gwabegar railway: Lue railway station
