= Lu (surname 盧) =

Chinese surname with character 卢/盧 (pinyin: Lú)

Lú (盧/卢)
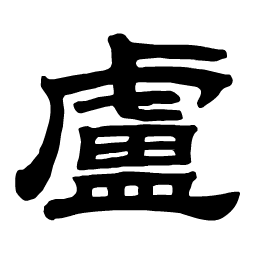
- Pronunciation: Lú (Mandarin); Lo (Cantonese)
- Language: Chinese

Origin
- Language: Old Chinese
- Origin: City of Lu, State of Qi

Other names
- Derivatives: Lư/Lô (Vietnamese); Roh/Noh/Ro/No (Korean)

Lú is the pinyin romanization of the Chinese surname written 盧 in traditional character and 卢 in simplified character. It is also spelled Lo or Loh according to the Cantonese pronunciation, and often spelt Law in Singapore. Lu 盧 is the 52nd most common surname in China, shared by 5.6 million people, or 0.475% of the Chinese population as of 2002. It is especially common in Guangdong, Guangxi, Hainan, and Hebei provinces. Lu 盧 is listed 167th in the Song dynasty classic text Hundred Family Surnames.

In 2019 it was the 50th most common surname in mainland China.

== Origins ==
According to the Tang dynasty genealogy text Yuanhe Xing Zuan, the surname Lu 盧 originated in the State of Qi during the Spring and Autumn period, and descended from Gao Xi (高傒). Gao Xi was the grandson of Prince Gao, who was a son of Duke Wen of Qi (reigned 815–804 BC) and a descendant of Lü Shang, the founder of Qi. When the Qi ruler Wuzhi was murdered in 685 BC, Gao Xi, then prime minister of Qi, helped to install Prince Xiaobai on the throne, to be known as Duke Huan of Qi, one of the Five Hegemons of the Spring and Autumn period. In gratitude, Duke Huan enfeoffed Gao Xi at the city of Lu 盧 (in modern Changqing District, Shandong province), and many of Gao's descendants adopted Lu 盧 as their surname. This is the main origin of the surname, and Gao Xi is regarded as the founding ancestor of the Lu 盧 surname.

According to the Song dynasty encyclopedia Tongzhi, there was a second source of the Lu 盧 surname from the State of Qi. A branch of Duke Huan of Qi's descendants had the surname Lupu (盧蒲), which was later shortened to Lu.

A separate source of Lu was the minor state of Luzi 廬子 or Lu 廬 (in modern Anhui province) during the Spring and Autumn period. The descendants of Jili (戢黎), a nobleman of Lu, adopted the name of their state as their surname. Lu 廬 was later simplified to Lu 盧.

== Distribution ==
Of the top 30 cities in China, 卢 ranked 9th most common in the city of Nanning.

== Later adoption ==
During the Xianbei Northern Wei dynasty, Emperor Xiaowen (reigned 467–499 AD) implemented a drastic policy of sinicization, ordering his own people to adopt Chinese surnames. The Tufulu (吐伏盧) and Molu (莫盧) clans of Xianbei adopted Lu as their surname. The Xianbei people have since completely assimilated into the Han Chinese.

According to the Book of Sui, Zhangchou Taiyi (章仇太翼), a native of Hejian Commandery (in modern Cangzhou, Hebei) was a famous scholar of the time. Emperor Yang of Sui granted him the surname Lu 盧. Zhangchou subsequently became known as Lu Taiyi, and was the ancestor of the prosperous Hejian Lu clan.

== Lu clan of Fanyang ==
In the fourth century BC, the throne of the Qi state was usurped by the Tian clan. Many aristocratic clans that descended from the old ruling house of Jiang (姜), including Lu, fled the state and dispersed all over China. During the Qin dynasty, the erudite Lu Ao (盧敖) settled in Fanyang Commandery (modern Beijing). The Fanyang Lu clan later became exceedingly prosperous. During the Jin dynasty (266–420), the Fanyang Lu, together with the Cui clan of Boling, the Wang clan of Taiyuan, the Zheng clan of Xingyang, and the Li clan of Zhao, were considered the five most prominent clans in China (海內五大望族). During the Tang dynasty, eight chancellors were surnamed Lu 盧, including several from Fanyang.

During the Tang dynasty the Li clan of Zhao 趙郡李氏, the Cui clan of Boling, the Cui clan of Qinghe, the Lu clan of Fanyang, the Zheng clan of Xingyang 滎陽鄭氏, the Wang clan of Taiyuan 太原王氏, and the Li clan of Longxi 隴西李氏 were the seven noble clans between whom marriage was banned by law. Their status as "Seven Great surnames" became known during Gaozong's rule.

== Notable people ==
- Lu Wan (盧綰; 256–194 BC), Western Han dynasty general
- Lu Zhi (盧植; died 192 AD), Eastern Han dynasty politician
- Lu Sidao (盧思道; 531–582), Sui dynasty poet
- Lu Chengqing (盧承慶; 595–670), Tang dynasty chancellor
- Lu Zhaolin (盧照鄰; ca. 634 – ca. 686) Tang dynasty poet
- Lu Huaishen (盧懷慎; died 716), Tang dynasty chancellor
- Lu Qi (盧杞; died 785), Tang dynasty chancellor
- Lu Lun (盧綸; 739–799), Tang dynasty poet
- Lu Han (盧翰; fl. 8th century), Tang dynasty chancellor
- Lu Tong (盧仝; died 835), Tang dynasty poet
- Lu Shang (盧商; 789–859), Tang dynasty chancellor
- Lu Xi (盧攜; died 881), Tang dynasty chancellor
- Lu Zhi (盧摯; 1243–1315), Yuan dynasty poet
- Lu Xiangsheng (盧象昇; 1600–1639), Ming dynasty general of Tianxiong Army
- Lu Kun (盧坤; 1772–1835), Qing dynasty viceroy of Huguang and Liangguang
- Lu Muzhen (盧慕貞; 1867–1952), Sun Yat-sen's first wife
- Lu Yongxiang (盧永祥; 1867–1933), warlord
- C. T. Loo (盧芹齋, Lu Qinzhai; 1880–1957), art dealer
- Lu Han (盧漢; 1895–1974), Kuomintang general
- Lu Jiaxi (chemist) (卢嘉锡; 1915–2001), chemist, President of the Chinese Academy of Sciences
- Lisa Lu (盧燕; Lu Yan; born 1927), actress
- Lu Yen (盧炎; Lu Yan; 1930–2008), Taiwanese composer
- Lu Yonggen ( 卢永根; 1930–2019), plant geneticist, President of South China Agricultural University
- Lu Ruihua (卢瑞华; 1938–2025), Governor of Guangdong province
- Lo Hoi-pang (盧海鵬; Lu Haipeng; born 1941), Hong Kong actor
- Lu Hsiu-yi (盧修一; Liu Xiuyi; 1941–1998), Taiwanese politician
- Lowell Lo (盧冠廷; Lu Guanting; born 1950), Hong Kong musician
- Anna Lo (盧曼華; Lo Manwah; born 1950), Hong Kong-born Northern Ireland politician
- Lu Zhangong (卢展工; born 1952), party chief of Fujian and Henan provinces
- Ken Lo (盧惠光; Lu Huiguang; born 1959), Hong Kong actor and martial artist
- Money Lo (盧敏儀, born 1960), a Hong Kong actress
- Lu Shiow-yen (盧秀燕, born 1961), a Taiwanese politician and former television presenter
- Ed Lu (盧傑; Lu Jie; born 1963), Chinese American physicist, NASA astronaut of the International Space Station
- Lu Shaye (卢沙野; born 1964), diplomat
- Calvin Lo (盧啟賢), Hong Kong businessman
- Chris Lu (盧沛寧; Lu Peining; born 1966), Chinese-American politician
- Candy Lo (盧巧音; Lu Qiaoyin; born 1974), Hong Kong singer and actress
- Monica Lo (卢淑仪; Lu Shuyi; born 1978), Hong Kong–based Canadian actress and model
- Lu Rui En (卢瑞恩; born 1981), Singaporean actress and singer
- Lu Yen-Hsun (盧彥勳; Lu Yanxun; born 1983), Taiwanese tennis player
- Lo Kwan Yee (盧均宜; Lu Junyi; born 1984), Hong Kong football player
- Lo Chun Kit (盧俊傑; Lu Junjie; born 1985), Hong Kong football player
- Lu Ying-chi (盧映錡; born 1985), Taiwanese weightlifter
- Crowd Lu (盧廣仲; Lu Guangzhong; born 1985), Taiwanese singer-songwriter
- Lu Lin (卢琳; born 1985), football player
- Ellen Joyce Loo (盧凱彤; Lu Kaitong; 1986–2018), Hong Kong–based Canadian singer-songwriter
- Lu Lan (卢兰; born 1987), badminton player
- Lu Junyi (盧俊義), fictional character in the novel Water Margin
- Anson Lo (盧瀚霆; born 1995), Hong Kong singer, dancer and actor
- Lu Yuxiao (盧昱曉; born 1999), Chinese actress

== Notable Korean people with the 盧 surname ==
- Lho Shin-yong (盧信永; 1930–2019), 18th Prime Minister of South Korea
- Roh Tae-woo (盧泰愚; 1932–2021), former South Korean president
- Ro Jai-bong (盧在鳳; 1936–2024), 22nd Prime Minister of South Korea
- Roh Moo-hyun (盧武鉉; 1946–2009), former South Korean president
