= Lo (given name) =

The name Lo can be used as a shortened form of a number of names, such as Laura, Lauren, Dolores, Sloane, Olivia, Lucia, Lois, Lola, Loretta, Lorena or Loleriana. People named "Lo" include:

- Lô Borges (1952–2025), a Brazilian singer-songwriter and guitarist
- Lo Bosworth (born 1986), an American television personality
- Lo Boutwell (1892–1969), a professional football player, played in the National Football League during 1922 and 1923
- Lo La Chapelle (1888–1966), a Dutch footballer, played club football for amateur side HVV Den Haag
- Lo Spagna (died 1529), a painter of the High-Renaissance, active in central Italy
- Lo-ruhamah, the first daughter of the prophet Hosea and his wife Gomer in the Book of Hosea (1:6–8)

== See also ==
- L. O. Wenckebach (1895–1962), a Dutch sculptor, painter, and medallist
