= Louie (surname) =

Louie is a romanization of the Chinese surname Lei (雷), often used among speakers of Cantonese or Southern Min dialects

- Alexina Louie (born 1949), Canadian composer
- Brandt C. Louie (born 1943), Canadian accountant and businessman
- Bryce Louie (born 2002), American fencer
- Clarence Louie (born 1960), Canadian First Nations leader and businessman
- David M. Louie (born 1951), American attorney, former Attorney General of Hawaii
- David Wong Louie (1954-2018), American novelist, short story writer and essayist.
- Gilman Louie (born 1960), American game designer and venture capitalist
- Janis Louie (born 1971), chemistry professor working at the University of Utah
- Juliette Louie (born 1994), Miss Hong Kong 2017
- "Lakewood" Louie, American poker player best known for his success at the World Series of Poker in the late 1970s and early 1980s
- Steven Gwon Sheng Louie (born 1949), Canadian Chinese physicist
