= Lu Cai =

Chinese playwright

Lu Cai (Chinese: 陆采; 1497–1537) was a Ming dynasty Chinese playwright. He wrote five chuanqi plays; only Romance of the Bright Pearl (《明珠记》), Romance of homesickness (《怀乡记》) and Romance of the Southwest Chamber (《南西厢记》) have survived.
