= Lou (surname 楼) =

Chinese family name

Lou (楼/樓)
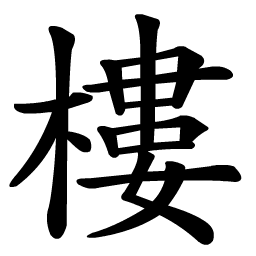
- Pronunciation: Lóu (Mandarin)
- Language: Chinese

Origin
- Language: Old Chinese

Lóu is the pinyin romanization of the Chinese surname written 楼 in simplified character and 樓 in traditional character. It is the 269th most common surname in China, shared by approximately 220,000 people. Lou 楼 is not listed in the Song dynasty classic text Hundred Family Surnames.

== Demographics ==
As of 2008, there are approximately 220,000 people surnamed Lou 楼, or 0.018% of the total Chinese population, making it the 269th most common surname in China. Distribution of the surname is highly uneven; the coastal province of Zhejiang in eastern China has the highest concentration of the surname, followed by Shanghai, Guangxi, and Jiangxi. As early as the Song dynasty (960–1279), when there were approximately 70,000 people surnamed Lou 楼, Zhejiang already had a high concentration of the surname. After the Mongol invasion of China and the short-lived Yuan dynasty, by the Ming dynasty the Lou-surnamed population declined to 32,000, still highly concentrated in Zhejiang.

== Origins ==
According to tradition, there are two main sources of the Lou 楼 surname:

1. From the State of Qǐ (杞) during the Zhou dynasty. King Wu of Zhou enfeoffed Duke Donglou at Qi (in modern Qi County, Kaifeng, Henan province). Duke Donglou's son and successor was Duke Xilou. The state was later moved to Shandong and destroyed by King Hui of Chu. Some descendants of dukes Donglou and Xilou adopted Lou 楼, the second character in their names, as their surname. This source of Lou began around 800 BC, and is a branch of Si, the ducal surname of Qi.

2. From the State of Jin during the Spring and Autumn period. Zhao Ying (赵婴), a son of the powerful minister Zhao Cui (趙衰; died 622 BC), was enfeoffed at the settlement of Lou 楼 (in modern Yonghe County, Shanxi province). Zhao Ying was thereafter also called Lou Ying, and his descendants adopted Lou 楼 as their surname. As the Zhao clan was a branch of the ancient surname of Ying, this source of Lou is a sublineage of Ying. It branched off the Zhao surname about 2,600 years ago.

== Later adoption ==
During the Xianbei Northern Wei dynasty, Emperor Xiaowen (reigned 467–499 AD) implemented a drastic policy of sinicization, ordering his own people to adopt Han surnames. The Gailou 盖楼 and Helou 贺楼 tribes of Xianbei adopted Lou 楼 as their surname.

== Ningbo Lou clan ==
One of the most prominent clans of the Lou surname is that of Ningbo, a major port city of Zhejiang. It is often called the Mingzhou or Siming Lou clan from the old names of Ningbo. This lineage of Lous rose to prominence during the Song dynasty, and produced a large number of jinshi degree holders, who had the right to hold office in the central government. The highest-ranking of them was Lou Yue (樓鑰; 1137–1213), one of the most respected scholars and government officials of his time.

== Notable people ==
- Lou Huan (楼缓; fl. 3rd century BC), Warring States period diplomat and Prime Minister of the state of Qin
- Lou Xuan (樓玄; fl. 3rd century AD), government minister of the Eastern Wu
- Lou Yue (樓鑰; 1137–1213), Song dynasty scholar and government official
- Lou Zhicen (楼之岑; 1920–1995), biologist, member of the Chinese Academy of Engineering
- Lou Jiwei (楼继伟; born 1950), Finance Minister of China, former Vice Governor of Guizhou
- Billy Lau or Lou Nanguang (樓南光; born 1954), Hong Kong actor
- Lou Yangsheng (楼阳生; born 1959), deputy Communist Party Chief of Shanxi province
- Lou Yun (楼云; born 1964), gymnast, Olympic champion
- Lou Yaping (樓亞萍; born 1971), Olympic swimmer
