= Loi Wai Hong =

Macau footballer

Personal information
- Full name: Loi Wai Hong
- Date of birth: 17 January 1992 (age 34)
- Place of birth: Macau
- Height: 1.69 m (5 ft 7 in)
- Position: Midfielder

Team information
- Current team: Benfica de Macau

Senior career*
Years	Team	Apps	(Gls)
2008–2012	MFA Development		
2013	G.D. Lam Pak	9	(1)
2016	Hang Sai		
2017–	Benfica de Macau		

International career^{‡}
2009–2012	Macau	14	(1)
Chinese name
Traditional Chinese	雷偉洪
Hanyu Pinyin	Léi Wěihóng
Yale Romanization	Lèuih Wáih-hùhng
Jyutping	Leoi4 Wai5-hung4
- * Club domestic league appearances and goals as of 6 June 2018 ‡ National team caps and goals as of 6 June 2018

Loi Wai Hong is a footballer from Macau who plays as a midfielder for Benfica de Macau.
