= Lü (state) =

Lü 呂
- Capital: West of Nanyang, Henan
- Religion: Chinese folk religion, ancestor worship, Taoism
- Government: Monarchy
- Currency: Chinese coin
- ISO 3166 code: LU
Preceded by	Succeeded by
Zhou dynasty	State of Chu

Lü (simplified Chinese: 吕; traditional Chinese: 呂; pinyin: Lǚ) was a Zhou dynasty vassal state in present-day central China in the early years of the Spring and Autumn period (722–481 BC).

== Origin ==
As the rulers of the four states of Qi, Xu, Shen and Lü all had the surname Jiang (姜), they claimed a common ancestry.

== See also ==
- Lü (surname)
