= Lu (surname 鹿) =

Lù (鹿)
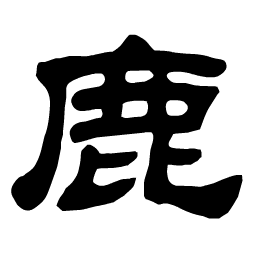
- Pronunciation: Lù (Mandarin); Luk (Cantonese)
- Language: Chinese

Origin
- Language: Old Chinese

Lu (Chinese: 鹿; pinyin: Lù) is a Chinese surname. It is also spelled Luk according to the Cantonese pronunciation. Lu (鹿) is a relatively uncommon name that is not listed in the Song dynasty classic text Hundred Family Surnames.

== Origin ==
According to the second-century Eastern Han text Fengsu Tongyi, Lu (鹿) originated from Ji (姬), the royal surname of the Zhou dynasty. After the Zhou conquered the Shang dynasty in 11th century BC, Kang Shu, a son of King Wen of Zhou and younger brother of King Wu of Zhou, was enfeoffed at the capital region of Shang, establishing the State of Wey. A descendant of Kang Shu was enfeoffed at Wulu (五鹿, northeast of modern Puyang, Henan), and this branch of the Wey royal house adopted Wulu as their surname, later shortened to Lu (鹿). Kang Shu is generally revered as the founding ancestor of the Lu (鹿) surname.

== Xianbei adoption ==
During the Xianbei Northern Wei dynasty, Emperor Xiaowen (reigned 467–499 AD) implemented a drastic policy of sinicization, ordering his own people to adopt Chinese surnames. The Aluhuan (阿鹿桓) clan of Xianbei adopted Lu (鹿) as their surname.

== Notable people ==
- Lu Yanhong (鹿晏弘; died 886), Tang dynasty warlord
- Lu Shanji (鹿善繼; 1575–1636), Ming dynasty politician, ethnic Mongol
- Lu You (鹿祐), Qing dynasty politician
- Lu Chuanlin (鹿傳霖; 1836–1910), Qing dynasty minister and governor of several provinces
- Lu Zhonglin (鹿钟麟; 1884–1966), Kuomintang general of the northwestern army
- Lu Tianji (鹿田计; born 1929), former member of the Central Committee of the Chinese Communist Party
- Lu Xinshe (鹿心社; born 1956), governor of Jiangxi province
- Lu Han (鹿晗; born 1990), singer and actor, ex-member of the Korean-Chinese boy band EXO
- Lu Yiwen (鹿译文; born 1996), member of the Chinese women's water polo national team
- Luh Dun-jin, Deputy Minister of the Directorate-General of Budget, Accounting and Statistics of the Republic of China
