= Simon Lui (professor) =

- Chinese: 雷兆恆
- Born: August 21, 1981 (age 43); Hong Kong
- Occupation(s): Adjunct Professor, Singapore University of Technology and Design
- Website: Simon Lui

Simon Lui (Chinese: 雷兆恆) is a computer music researcher. Lui is currently an adjunct professor in the Singapore University of Technology and Design. Simon was a Visiting Assistant Professor in the Massachusetts Institute of Technology in 2012-2013, and a Marie Curie Fellow in 2011.

Lui is one of the earliest iPhone and iPad app developers worldwide, especially well known for mobile game development. He is one of the pioneers in developing iPhone app Hong Kong, and a well-reputed gadget specialist. Lui has published seven apps since 2008, including several best-selling apps in Southern Asia, as well as Canada's iPhone/iPad app store; his story was reported by CNN International. Lui is currently focusing on mobile app research and education.

Lui is also a violinist, erhuist, guitarist, beatboxer, and music arranger. He was the concert master of the Hong Kong Youth Strings and Hong Kong Stage Ensemble. Lui is the founder of Girl's and Boys A'Cappella - the champion of the 2005 Hong Kong ICMA Singing Contest (group). Lui has been involved in hundreds of pop music concert, classical performance, game music production and CD recordings. Simon is a member of the Composers and Authors Society of Hong Kong (CASH).
