= Lu (surname 路) =

Chinese family name

Lù (路)
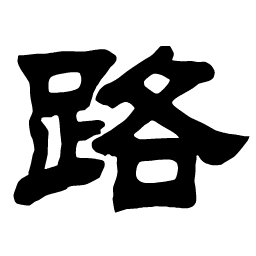
- Pronunciation: Lù (Mandarin); Lo (Cantonese)
- Language: Chinese

Origin
- Language: Old Chinese
- Origin: Lushi state
- Meaning: "road"

Lu (Chinese: 路; pinyin: Lù) is a Chinese surname. It is also spelled Lo according to the Cantonese pronunciation. Lu 路 is listed 138th in the Song dynasty classic text Hundred Family Surnames. Lu 路 is the 116th most common surname in China, with a total population of 2.35 million.

== Demographics and distribution ==
As of 2013, Lu 路 is the 116th most common surname in China, shared by 2.35 million people, or 0.18% of the Chinese population. It is distributed widely across China, but the provinces of Hebei, Shandong, Anhui, and Henan have especially high concentrations of it; the four provinces account for 70% of the total population with the surname.

== Origins ==
According to the ninth-century Tang dynasty text Yuanhe Xing Zuan, the Lu 路 surname originated from the Red Di state of Lushi (潞氏 or 路氏), also called Lu, which was named after the river Lu (present-day Zhuozhang River, a tributary of the Zhang River). In 594 BC Lushi was conquered by Duke Jing, the ruler of the State of Jin, a major power of the Spring and Autumn period. The people of Lu/Lushi subsequently adopted Lu 路 as their surname.

Another origin of Lu 路 is the Western Zhou dynasty (1046–771 BC) government office of luzheng (路正), which was responsible for managing roads and transportation (Lu 路 means road in Chinese). Some descendants of people who held the office adopted Lu as their surname.

A third, legendary origin of Lu 路 is from Xuanyuan (玄元), a son of Emperor Zhi and grandson of Emperor Ku. He was enfeoffed as Marquis of Luzhong (路中侯) by Emperor Yao, and his descendants adopted Lu (from Luzhong) as their surname.

== Later adoption ==
During the Xianbei Northern Wei dynasty, Emperor Xiaowen (reigned 467–499 AD) implemented a drastic policy of sinicization, ordering his own people to adopt Chinese surnames. The Moluzhen (没路真) tribe of Xianbei adopted Lu 路 as their surname.

Some of the Dong people, an ethnic minority group of China, have also adopted Lu 路 as their surname.

== Notable people ==
- Lu Bode (路博德; fl. 119–109 BC), Western Han general, conqueror of Nanyue and Hainan
- Lu Wenshu (路温舒), Western Han scholar
- Lu Huinan (路惠男; 412–466), empress dowager of the Liu Song dynasty
- Empress Lu, consort of Emperor Qianfei of Liu Song, niece of Lu Huinan
- Lu Sui (路隨; 776–835), Tang dynasty chancellor
- Lu Yan (路巖; 829–874), Tang dynasty chancellor
- Lu Zhongyi (路中一; 1849–1925), religious leader
- Lu Yongxiang (路甬祥; born 1942), former president of the Chinese Academy of Sciences
- Lu Yao (路遥; 1949–1992), writer
- Ping Lu (路平; Lu Ping; born 1953), Taiwanese writer
- Lu Xuechang (路学长; 1964–2014), film director
- Jozie Lu (路嘉欣; Lu Jiaxin; born 1979), Taiwanese actress and singer
- Lu Jiang (路姜; born 1981), football player
- Cuicui Lu (路 翠翠; born 1986), Chinese physicist
- Lu Chen (路晨; born 1987), actress
- Johnny Lu (路斯明), born Johnny Chen, Taiwanese-American actor
