= Lu (surname 蘆) =

Chinese family name

Lú (芦/蘆)
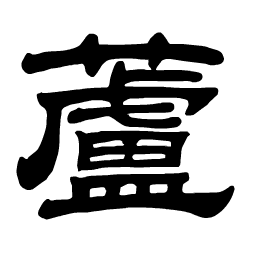
- Pronunciation: Lú (Mandarin); Lo (Cantonese)
- Language: Chinese

Origin
- Language: Middle Chinese
- Meaning: Reed

Lú is the pinyin romanization of the Chinese surname written 芦 in simplified character and 蘆 in traditional character. It is also spelled Lo according to the Cantonese pronunciation. Lu 芦 is the 140th most common surname in China, with a population of 980,000. A relatively new surname, it is not listed in the Song dynasty classic text Hundred Family Surnames.

== Demographics ==
As of 2008, Lu 蘆 is the 140th most common surname in China, shared by 980,000 people, or 0.079% of the Chinese population. It is concentrated in the provinces of Anhui, Hubei, Hebei, and Henan, which altogether account for 43% of the total, including 17% in Anhui alone.

== Origins ==
Lu 蘆 is a relatively new surname by Chinese standard, with a history of about 1,500 years. It was first recorded during the Xianbei Northern Wei dynasty, when Emperor Xiaowen (reigned 467–499 AD) implemented a drastic policy of sinicization, ordering his own people to adopt Chinese-style surnames. The Molu (莫蘆) tribe of Xianbei adopted Lu 蘆 as their surname. During the Ming and Qing dynasties, many people of the Zhuang, Yao, and Miao ethnicities in southern China also adopted the surname.

== Notable people ==
- Lu Di (芦荻; 1931–2015), Peking University professor, animal rights activist
- Lu Xiumei (芦秀梅; 1957–2012), soprano singer
- Lu Xin (芦欣; born 1974), football player
- Lu Qiang (芦强; born 1989), football player
- Lu Zheyu (芦哲宇; born 1989), football player
- Lu Di (蘆笛), writer
- Lu Weiqi (蘆葦琪), TV presenter
