= Lu Sidao =

Chinese poet

Lu Sidao (Chinese: 盧思道; c.535 – 586), courtesy name Zixing (子行), was a Chinese poet of the Sui dynasty. He was from Fanyang Commandery which is now part of modern Beijing.
