= Lu (surname 魯) =

Chinese family name

魯
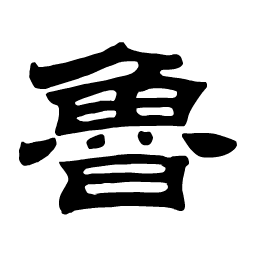
- Pronunciation: [lù] (Mandarin); [lɔw˩˧] (Cantonese)
- Language: Chinese

Origin
- Language: Old Chinese
- Origin: State of Lu

The Chinese surname 魯 (simplified: 鲁; pinyin: lǔ; Jyutping: lou^{5}) is listed 49th in the Song dynasty classic text Hundred Family Surnames. As of 2008, 魯 is the 115th most common surname in China.

== Origin ==
According to several ancient genealogy texts including the Tang dynasty Yuanhe Xing Zuan, Xing Pu (姓譜), and Xingshi Kaolue (姓氏考略), the surname 魯 originated from the ancient State of Lu, which was founded by Bo Qin, son of the Duke of Zhou, during the 11th century BC. During the Warring States period, Lu was conquered in 256 BC by the state of Chu, one of seven major powers of the period. Many of Lu's people subsequently adopted the name of their former state as a surname. It is considered a derivative of Ji (姬), the royal surname of the Zhou royal family.

== Notable people ==
- Lu Ban (507–440 BC), carpenter, engineer and inventor of the state of Lu
- Lu Su (172–217), politician and diplomat serving under Sun Quan of Eastern Wu
- Lu Xun (1881–1936), one of Republican China's most influential writers
- Lu Diping (1887–1935), Kuomintang general and provincial governor
- Lu Gwei-djen (1904–1991), academic and wife of Joseph Needham
- Lu Dadong (1915–1998), politician, Communist Party chief of Chongqing and governor of Sichuan
- Lu Min (1926–2000), Korean War flying ace
- Lu Ping (1927–2015), politician and diplomat
- Lu Guanqiu (1945–2017), entrepreneur, one of the wealthiest people in China
- Lu Zhishen, a character in the classic novel Water Margin

== See also ==
- Meng (surname).
