= Lü (surname) =

Lǚ 吕/呂
- Pronunciation: lǚ (Mandarin) leui (Cantonese)
- Language: Chinese

Origin
- Language: Old Chinese
- Origin: Lü (state)

Other names
- Variant forms: Lữ (Vietnamese), Lu, Lv, Lyu, Lui

Lü
- Simplified Chinese: 吕
- Traditional Chinese: 呂
Transcriptions
Standard Mandarin
- Hanyu Pinyin: Lǚ
- Wade–Giles: Lü^{3}
- Yale Romanization: Lyǔ
Yue: Cantonese
- Jyutping: Leoi^{5}

Lü (Mandarin: [ly˨˩˦]) is the pinyin (Lǚ with the tone diacritic) and Wade–Giles romanisation of a Chinese surname, most commonly 吕 (simplified Chinese) and 呂 (traditional Chinese).

== Romanization ==
Lü is the standard pinyin spelling of the Chinese character 吕/呂. When input of the umlaut is not possible, the surname is commonly romanized as Lu or Lv (v is the pinyin input shorthand for ü). On 31 October 2011, the National Standardization Committee of China issued The Chinese phonetic alphabet spelling rules for Chinese names, which stipulates that Lü may be spelled Lyu in such situations, for example in passports. The rule came into effect on 1 February 2012. The spelling of "Lyǔ" is also the spelling used in Yale romanization of Mandarin. In Cantonese the name is commonly romanized as Lui.

== Possible characters ==
=== 吕/呂 ===
吕/呂 is the 47th most common surname in China, shared by 5.6 million people, or 0.47% of the Chinese population as of 2002. It is especially common in Shandong and Henan provinces.

The surname originated from the ancient State of Lü. Lü Shang (fl. 11th century BC), the founder of the State of Qi, was the first person known to have the surname.

It is 22nd on the Hundred Family Surnames, contained in the verse 何呂施張 (He Lü Shi Zhang).

==== Jiang clan ====
The surname Lü originated from the Jiang 姜 clan, which is said to have descended from the legendary Yan Emperor. According to the Tang dynasty genealogy text Yuanhe Xing Zuan, a branch of the Jiang clan was enfeoffed at the State of Lü by Yu the Great, the legendary founder of the Xia dynasty.

The Jiang clan was a close ally and frequent marriage partner of the Ji clan, which conquered the Shang dynasty to establish the Zhou dynasty in 1046/45 BC. Lü Shang, also known as Jiang Ziya, is the first person known to have the surname. A member of the Lü lineage of the Jiang clan, he was a top general who led the Zhou army to defeat the Shang at the Battle of Muye. Another important general during the battle, Lü Ta, was also from the Lü lineage of the Jiang clan. After the establishment of Zhou, Lü Shang was enfeoffed at the State of Qi in modern Shandong province, which later became one of the major states of the Spring and Autumn and Warring States periods. Lü Shang, posthumously named Duke Tai of Qi, is considered an original ancestor of the Lü surname.

During the Western Zhou period, the State of Lü was near the Zhou court in modern Shaanxi. Inscriptions on many excavated bronzes from the period show that the Lü lineage played an active role in the Zhou court. Several people named Lü, including Lü Xing, Lü Gang, Lü Bo, and Lü Fuyu, were recorded to have participated in military campaigns, sometimes accompanying the Zhou king. During the late Western Zhou, the state moved to the Nanyang basin, in present-day southern Henan. During the Spring and Autumn period, Lü was annexed by the State of Chu, a rising power in the south. Many people of Lü adopted their former state's name as their surname.

==== Ji clan ====
A different, later origin of Lü was from the Wei (魏) lineage of the Ji (姬) surname. During the Spring and Autumn period, Prince Chong'er was exiled from the Jin and one of his followers was Wei Wuzi (魏武子). Chong'er ascended the throne of Jin in 636 BC and became the Hegemon of China. Wei Wuzi's son Wei Qi (魏锜) was given the fiefs of Lü and Chu (厨). Many of his descendants changed their surname to Lü.

==== Later adoption ====
During the Xianbei Northern Wei dynasty, Emperor Xiaowen (reigned 467–499 AD) implemented a drastic policy of sinicization, ordering his own people to adopt Chinese surnames. The Chilü (叱吕) clan of Xianbei adopted Lü as their surname. The Xianbei people have since been assimilated by the Han Chinese.

People from many other ethnic minorities in China have also adopted Lü as their surname, including the Manchu, Li, Tu, Mongols, Tujia, and the Koreans.

=== 闾 ===
闾/閭 is a somewhat rare surname that means neighborhood, hamlet, gate of a lane, or alley.

== Notable people ==
- Lü Shang (11th century BC), Zhou dynasty general and founder of the State of Qi
- Duke Ding of Qi (Lü Ji; c. 10th century BC), second recorded ruler of Qi
- Lü Buwei (291?–235 BC), Chancellor of Qin, sponsored the creation of the Lüshi Chunqiu
- Empress Lü (241–180 BC), wife of Emperor Gaozu, effective ruler of the Han dynasty after the death of her husband
- Empress Lü (Houshao) (died c. 180 BC), wife of Emperor Houshao of Han
- Mother Lü (died 18 AD), rebel leader against the Xin dynasty
- Lü Bu (died 199), Eastern Han dynasty warlord
- Lü Meng (178–220), Eastern Wu military general
- Lü Dai (161–256), Eastern Wu military general
- Lü Fan (died 228), Eastern Wu official
- Lü Yi (died 238), Eastern Wu official
- Lü Yi (died 251), Shu Han official
- Lü Guang (337–400), founding emperor of Later Liang of the Sixteen Kingdoms
- Lü Shao (died 400), third son of Lü Guang, emperor of Later Liang
- Lü Zuan (died 401), first son of Lü Guang, emperor of Later Liang
- Lü Long (died 416), nephew of Lü Guang, last emperor of Later Liang
- Lü Yin (712–762), Tang dynasty chancellor
- Lü Dongbin (796–?), Tang dynasty scholar revered as one of the Eight Immortals
- Lü Mengzheng (吕蒙正; 946–1011), Song dynasty chancellor
- Lü Tiancheng (1580–1618), playwright and poet
- Lü Liuliang (1629–1683), poet and scholar
- Lü Bicheng (1883−1943), woman writer and activist
- Lü Simian (1884–1957), prominent historian
- Lü Shuxiang (1904–1998), linguist, a founder of modern Chinese linguistic studies
- Lü Zhengcao (1905–2009), People's Liberation Army general, Minister of Railways of China
- Lu Yudai (吕毓岱) Chuanyin (1927–2023) Guru Yang Mulia dari Asosiasi Buddhis Tiongkok
- Lü Peijian (born 1928), former Governor of the People's Bank of China and Auditor General of the National Audit Office
- Lu Liang-Huan (1936–2022), golfer
- Chuan Leekpai (born 1938), Chinese name Lü Jiwen, 20th Prime Minister of Thailand
- Annette Lu (born 1944), former Vice President of the Republic of China (Taiwan)
- Lü Fuyuan (1945–2004), Minister of Commerce of China
- Lü Zushan (born 1946), former Governor of Zhejiang province
- Jiang Rong (born 1946), real name Lü Jiamin, best-selling novelist
- Lü Xiwen (born 1955), former deputy party chief of Beijing
- Lu Kuo-hua (born 1956), Magistrate of Yilan County (2005–2009)
- Ray Lui (born 1956), Vietnam-born Hong Kong actor
- Roy Leu, Vice Minister of Overseas Community Affairs Council of the Republic of China
- Lü Yue (born 1957), cinematographer and film director
- Lü Liping (born 1960), actress
- Lü Qin (born 1962), xiangqi master
- David Lui Fong (呂方; born 1963), Hong Kong singer and actor
- Lü Junchang (1965–2018), palaeontologist
- Lü Wei (1966–1990), Chinese diver
- Lü Lin (born 1969), table tennis player, Olympic champion
- Anthony Ler Wee Teang (吕伟添; 1967–2002), better known as Anthony Ler, a Singaporean convicted murderer
- Lü Yan (born 1981), model and fashion designer
- Lü Wei (born 1983), Chinese female softball player
- Lü Jie (born 1984), model and actress
- Lü Xiaojun (born 1984), weightlifter, Olympic champion and world record holder
- Lü Jianjun (born 1985), professional football player
- Lü Wei (born 1986), Chinese-Canadian racing driver
- Lü Wei (born 1989), Chinese male footballer
- Lu Chia-pin (born 1990), Taiwanese badminton player
- Lü Yongdi (born 1993), Chinese footballer
- Lü Chuanzan (1932–2018), politician
- Taixu (born Lü Pèilín, 1890–1947), Buddhist master
- Lui Tuck Yew (吕德耀; born 1961), former Singaporean rear-admiral and politician; current Singaporean ambassador
