= Income =

Wealth gained over a given time period

Income is the consumption and saving opportunity gained by an entity within a specified timeframe, which is generally expressed in monetary terms. Income is difficult to define conceptually and the definition may be different across fields. For example, a person's income in an economic sense may be different from their income as defined by law.

An extremely important definition of income is Haig–Simons income, which defines income as Consumption + Change in net worth and is widely used in economics.

For households and individuals in the United States, income is defined by tax law as a sum that includes any wage, salary, profit, interest payment, rent, or other form of earnings received in a calendar year. Discretionary income is often defined as gross income minus taxes and other deductions (such as mandatory pension contributions), and is widely used as a basis to compare the welfare of taxpayers.

In the field of public economics, the concept may comprise the accumulation of both monetary and non-monetary consumption ability, with the former (monetary) being used as a proxy for total income.

For a firm, gross income can be defined as sum of all revenue minus the cost of goods sold. Net income nets out expenses: net income equals revenue minus cost of goods sold, expenses, depreciation, interest, and taxes.

== Economic definitions ==
=== Full and Haig–Simons income ===
"Full income" refers to the accumulation of both the monetary and the non-monetary consumption-ability of any given entity, such as a person or a household. According to what the economist Nicholas Barr describes as the "classical definition of income" (the 1938 Haig–Simons definition): "income may be defined as the... sum of (1) the market value of rights exercised in consumption and (2) the change in the value of the store of property rights..." Since the consumption potential of non-monetary goods, such as leisure, cannot be measured, monetary income may be thought of as a proxy for full income. As such, however, it is criticized for being unreliable, i.e. failing to accurately reflect affluence (and thus the consumption opportunities) of any given agent.

It omits the utility a person may derive from non-monetary income and, on a macroeconomic level, fails to accurately chart social welfare. According to Barr, "in practice money income as a proportion of total income varies widely and unsystematically. Non-observability of full income prevents a complete characterization of the individual opportunity set, forcing us to use the unreliable yardstick of money income.

=== Factor income ===
In economics, factor income is the return accruing for a person, or a nation, derived from the "factors of production": rental income, wages generated by labor, the interest created by capital, and profits from entrepreneurial ventures.

In consumer theory 'income' is another name for the "budget constraint", an amount $Y$ to be spent on different goods x and y in quantities $x$ and $y$ at prices $P_x$ and $P_y$. The basic equation for this is

$$Y=P_x \cdot x + P_y \cdot y$$

This equation implies two things. First buying one more unit of good x implies buying $\frac{P_x}{P_y}$ less units of good y. So, $\frac{P_x}{P_y}$ is the relative price of a unit of x as to the number of units given up in y. Second, if the price of x falls for a fixed $Y$ and fixed $P_y,$ then its relative price falls. The usual hypothesis, the law of demand, is that the quantity demanded of x would increase at the lower price. The analysis can be generalized to more than two goods.

The theoretical generalization to more than one period is a multi-period wealth and income constraint. For example, the same person can gain more productive skills or acquire more productive income-earning assets to earn a higher income. In the multi-period case, something might also happen to the economy beyond the control of the individual to reduce (or increase) the flow of income. Changing measured income and its relation to consumption over time might be modeled accordingly, such as in the permanent income hypothesis.

== Legal definitions ==
=== Definitions under the Internal Revenue Code ===
Except as otherwise provided in this subtitle, gross income means all income from whatever source derived, including (but not limited to) the following items: (1) Compensation for services, including fees, commissions, fringe benefits, and similar items; (2) Gross income derived from business; (3) Gains derived from dealings in property; (4) Interest; (5) Rents; (6) Royalties; (7) Dividends; (8) Annuities; (9) Income from life insurance and endowment contracts; (10) Pensions; (11) Income from discharge of indebtedness; (12) Distributive share of partnership gross income; (13) Income in respect of a decedent; and (14) Income from an interest in an estate or trust.

26 U.S. Code § 61 - Gross income defined. There are also some statutory exclusions from income.

=== Definition under US Case law ===
Income is an "undeniable accessions to wealth, clearly realized, and over which the taxpayer has complete dominion." Commentators say that this is a pretty good definition of income.

Taxable income is usually lower than Haig-Simons income. This is because unrealized appreciation (e.g., the increase in the value of stock over the course of a year) is economic income but not taxable income, and because there are many statutory exclusions from taxable income, including workman's compensation, SSI, gifts, child support, and in-kind government transfers.

== Accounting definitions ==
The International Accounting Standards Board (IASB) uses the following definition: "Income is increases in economic benefits during the accounting period in the form of inflows or enhancements of assets or decreases of liabilities that result in increases in equity, other than those relating to contributions from equity participants." [F.70] (IFRS Framework).

Previously the IFRS conceptual framework (4.29) stated: "The definition of income encompasses both revenue and gains. Revenue arises in the course of the ordinary activities of an entity and is referred to by a variety of different names including sales, fees, interest, dividends, royalties and rent. 4.30: Gains represent other items that meet the definition of income and may, or may not, arise in the course of the ordinary activities of an entity. Gains represent increases in economic benefits and as such are no different in nature from revenue. Hence, they are not regarded as constituting a separate element in this Conceptual Framework."

The current IFRS conceptual framework (4.68) no longer draws a distinction between revenue and gains. Nevertheless, the distinction continues to be drawn at the standard and reporting levels. For example, IFRS 9.5.7.1 states: "A gain or loss on a financial asset or financial liability that is measured at fair value shall be recognised in profit or loss ..." while the IASB defined IFRS XBRL taxonomy includes OtherGainsLosses, GainsLossesOnNetMonetaryPosition and similar items.

US GAAP does not define income but does define comprehensive income (CON 8.4.E75): Comprehensive income is the change in equity of a business entity during a period from transactions and other events and circumstances from nonowner sources. It includes all changes in equity during a period except those resulting from investments by owners and distributions to owners.

According to John Hicks' definitions, income "is the maximum amount which can be spent during a period if there is to be an expectation of maintaining intact, the capital value of prospective receipts (in money terms)".

== "Nonincome" ==
=== Debt ===
Borrowing or repaying money is not income under any definition, for either the borrower or the lender. Interest and forgiveness of debt are income.

=== Psychic income ===
"Non-monetary joy," such as watching a sunset or having sex, simply is not income. Similarly, nonmonetary suffering, such as heartbreak or labor, are not negative income. This may seem trivial, but the non-inclusion of psychic income has important effects on economics and tax policy. It encourages people to find happiness in nonmonetary, nontaxable ways and means that reported income may overstate or understate the well-being of a given individual.

== Income growth ==
Income per capita has been increasing steadily in most countries. Many factors contribute to people having a higher income, including education, globalisation and favorable political circumstances such as economic freedom and peace. Increases in income also tend to lead to people choosing to work fewer hours. Developed countries (defined as countries with a "developed economy") have higher incomes as opposed to developing countries tending to have lower incomes.

=== Factors contributing to higher income ===
Education has a positive effect on the level of income. Education increases the skills of the workforce, which in turn increases its productivity (and thus higher wages). Gary Becker developed a Human Capital Theory, which emphasizes that investment in education and training lead to efficiency gains, and by extension to economic growth.

Globalization can increase incomes by integrating markets, and allowing individuals greater possibilities of income increases through efficient allocation of resources and expanding existing wealth.

Generally, countries more open to trade have higher incomes. And while globalization tends to increase average income in a country, it does so unequally. Sachs and Warner claim, that "countries with open economies will converge to the same level of income, although admittedly it will take a long time."

== Income inequality ==
Income inequality is the extent to which income is distributed in an uneven manner. It can be measured by various methods, including the Lorenz curve and the Gini coefficient. Many economists argue that certain amounts of inequality are necessary and desirable but that excessive inequality leads to efficiency problems and social injustice. Thereby necessitating initiatives like the United Nations Sustainable Development Goal 10 aimed at reducing inequality.

== National Income ==
National income, measured by statistics such as net national income (NNI), measures the total income of individuals, corporations, and government in the economy. For more information see Measures of national income and output.

The total output of an economy equals its total income. From this viewpoint, GDP can be an indicator and measurement of national income since it measures a nation's total production of goods and services produced within the borders of one country and its total income simultaneously. GDP is measured through factors of production (inputs) and the production function (the ability to turn inputs into outputs). One important note in this is income distribution working through the factor market and how national income is divided among these factors. For this examination, the Neoclassical theory of distribution and factor prices is the modern theory to look into.

== Basic income ==
Basic income models advocate for a regular, and usually unconditional, receipt of money from the public institution. There are many basic income models, with the most famous being Universal Basic Income.

=== Universal Basic Income ===
Universal Basic Income is a periodic receival of cash given to individuals on universal and unconditional basis. Unlike other programs like the Food Stamp Program, UBI provides eligible recipients with cash instead of coupons. Instead of households, it is paid to all individuals without requiring means test and regardless of employment status.

The proponents of UBI argue, that basic income is needed for social protection, mitigating automation and labour market disruptions. Opponents argue that UBI, in addition to being costly, will distort incentives for individuals to work. They might argue that there are other and more cost-effective policies that can tackle problems raised by the proponents of UBI. These policies include for example negative income tax.

== Income in philosophy and ethics ==
Throughout history, many have written about the impact of income on morality and society. Saint Paul wrote 'For the love of money is a root of all kinds of evil:' (1 Timothy 6:10 (ASV)).

Some scholars have come to the conclusion that material progress and prosperity, as manifested in continuous income growth at both the individual and the national level, provide the indispensable foundation for sustaining any kind of morality. This argument was explicitly given by Adam Smith in his Theory of Moral Sentiments, and has more recently been developed by Harvard economist Benjamin Friedman in his book The Moral Consequences of Economic Growth.

== Income and health ==
National homicide rates are generally lower in countries with higher gross national income (GNI) per person.

Homicide rates show a stronger correlation with median personal income than for gross national income per person, as GNI is skewed toward extremely wealthy individual persons.

A landmark systematic review from Harvard University researchers in the Cochrane Collaboration found that income given in the form of unconditional cash transfers leads to reductions in disease, improvements in food security and dietary diversity, increases in children's school attendance, decreases in extreme poverty, and higher health care spending.

The Health Foundation published an analysis where people on the lower income spectrum were more likely to describe their health negatively. Higher income was associated with self-reported better health. Another study found that "an increase in household income of £1,000 is associated with a 3.6 month increase in life expectancy for both men and women."

A study by a Professor of Epidemiology Michael G Marmot found argues that there are two ways which could explain a positive correlation between income and health: the ability to afford goods and services necessary for biological survival, and the ability to influence life circumstances.

Russell Ecob and George Davey Smith found that there is a relationship between income and a number of health measures. Greater household equivalised income is associated with better health indicators such as height, waist–hip ratio, respiratory function, malaise, limiting long-term illness.

== History ==
Income is conventionally denoted by "Y" in economics. John Hicks used "I" for income, but Keynes wrote to him in 1937, "after trying both, I believe it is easier to use Y for income and I for investment." Some consider Y as an alternative letter for the phoneme I in languages like Spanish, although Y as the "Greek I" was actually pronounced like the modern German ü or the phonetic /y/.

== See also ==
- Citizen's dividend
- Comprehensive income
- Decoupling of wages from productivity
- Disposable household and per capita income
- Income tax
- List of countries by GNI (nominal) per capita
- List of countries by GNI (PPP) per capita
- Median income
- Minimum wage
  - Guaranteed minimum income
- Personal income
- Real income
- Revenue
- Social dividend
- Universal basic income
- Unpaid work
