= Gross national income =

Total domestic and foreign economic output

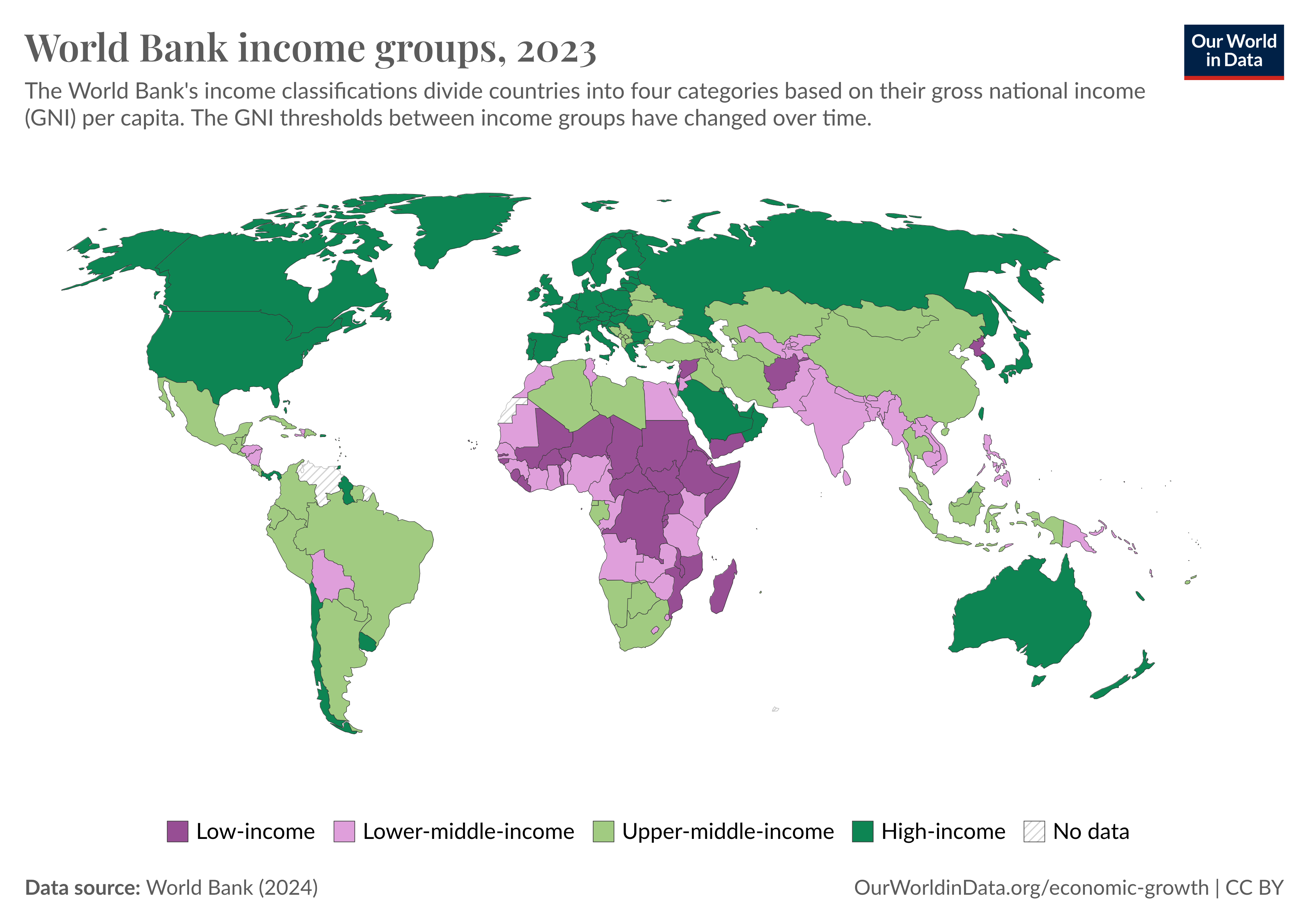
Map of countries by income groups, based on their gross national income (GNI) per capita, 2023, according to World Bank

Gross national income (GNI), formerly known as gross national product (GNP), is the total amount of factor incomes earned by the residents of a country. It is equal to gross domestic product (GDP), plus factor incomes received from non-residents by residents, minus factor income paid by residents to non-residents.

In contrast to GDP, GNI is not a concept of value added, but a concept of income. GNI is the basis of calculation of the largest part of contributions to the Budget of the European Union. In February 2017, Ireland's GDP became so distorted from the base erosion and profit shifting ("BEPS") tax planning tools of U.S. multinationals, that the Central Bank of Ireland replaced Irish GDP with a new metric, Irish Modified GNI (or "GNI*"). In 2017, Irish GDP was 127% of Irish GNI and 162% of Irish Modified GNI.

GNI contrast with net national income : NNI = GNI - Depreciation

The Atlas method can be applied to correct for fluctuating exchange rates.

== Comparison of GNI and GDP ==
$\mathrm{GNI} = \mathrm{GDP} + \text{Money flowing from foreign countries} - \text{Money flowing to foreign countries}$

Comparison of GNI (Atlas method). GNI and GDP 2025 World Bank (millions of current US$)
Country	GNI (Atlas method)		GNI		GDP
Country	a	a - c	b	b - c	c
United States	30352333.8	−466392.3	29194127.0	164165.0	27360935.0
China	20015542.8	1104478.2	18615022.9	−131070.1	17794782.0
Germany	5026012.3	646932.4	4847009.0	203987.2	4212945.2
Japan	4730424.84	103052.1	4290008.0	178408.2	4456081.0
India	4036219.0	80317.8	3853338.9	−52097.4	3549918.9
United Kingdom	3790859.1	−73042.8	3659245.4	−43335.4	3340032.4
France	3341656.4	41559.7	3221122.9	47987.2	3030904.1
Italy	2479102.4	−10266.3	2374544.0	−3942.8	2254851.2
Canada	2349971.0	22547.1	2210877.7	−30699.9	2140085.6
Russia	2329665.53	63336.6	2145349.9	−27001.6	2021421.5
Brazil	2245438.9	−2108530.0	2112836.2	−63108.6	2173665.7
South Korea	1958041.5	122682.9	1902456.7	31909.8	1712792.9
Spain	1832028.26	−41827.8	1805281.8	−71320.8	1723827.2
Mexico	1811632.4	−1674500.0	1721317.2	−10836.8	1580694.7
Australia	1770610.6	−234550.7	1695733.1	−44175.4	1788886.8
Indonesia	1463075.8	−18582.8	1359439.6	−35304.8	1371171.2
Turkey	1399760.9	−33335.0	1343248.7	−6673.3	1118124.7
Saudi Arabia	1333696.98	−7726.9	1245906.1	5835.5	1067582.9
Netherlands	1239617.9	−114010.1	1204132.0	−11213.0	1108022.4
Switzerland	1003145.	−42808.3	897366.8	−27647.8	884940.4
Poland	929793.0	−87547.1	887015.3	−34122.6	811229.1
Belgium	710506.4	651342.4	682334.1	23537.2	593267.7
Argentina	671607.6	12471.7	630512.1	13803.3	632216.6
Sweden	667681.4	−56481.4	625195.0	−14253.3	640591.4
Israel	568737.5	80024.9	568335.7	20147.1	485513.3
Philippines	566821.5	26956.3	535825.3	−922.2	509901.5
United Arab Emirates	566397.9	604.3	533758.6	−12024.2	514945.0
Austria	555765.6	13974.2	521766.4	−919.6	504173.5
Thailand	550619.2	−13102.9	510441.3	−1590.5	516034.1
Norway	546004.2	59019.8	505791.6	48008.2	437146.4
Vietnam	490164.5	56516.6	454873.5	17458.1	437415.3
Singapore	439247.2	43321.1	378607.7	−17318.4	395926.1
Bangladesh	436283.0	32084.2	418427.5	14228.7	404198.8
Ireland	432496.7	69681.8	355832.5	−6982.4	362815.0
Hong Kong	423058.9	−122570.6	421766.9	−123862.6	545629.5
Denmark	417722.2	−83705.3	420675.1	−80752.4	501427.5
Malaysia	417389.0	15884.5	401036.3	−468.3	401504.5
Iran	415973.1	33918.5	416242.1	34187.5	382054.6
Colombia	412944.1	−16772.8	407254.0	−22463.0	429717.0
South Africa	410754.5	11105.6	387578.2	−12070.6	399648.8
Egypt	407575.9	29794.3	372625.7	−5155.9	377781.6
Romania	360729.3	22360.9	332603.5	−5765.0	338368.5
Pakistan	357640.3	−5899.9	361333.8	−2206.4	363540.2
Czech Republic	317743.0	−33259.6	341578.5	−9424.1	351002.6
Chile	310627.6	−24905.7	318450.1	−17083.2	335533.3
Finland	298118.3	−2068.9	299653.1	−534.1	300187.2
Czech Republic	294826.0	−36032.4	315842.0	−15016.4	330858.3
Portugal	276490.3	−10589.7	281729.0	−5351.1	287080.0
Iraq	254601.2	3758.4	252096.7	1253.9	250842.8
New Zealand	253873.8	408.1	247095.5	−6370.2	253465.7
Peru	240295.2	−27308.1	253910.6	−13692.7	267603.2
Greece	233934.8	−4271.5	236451.9	−1754.4	238206.3
Algeria	226263.4	−13636.1	236495.6	−3403.9	239899.5
Kazakhstan	217777.6	−43643.6	235418.9	−26002.2	261421.1
Kuwait	198885.2	37113.0	194323.8	32551.6	161772.2
Hungary	190073.7	−22315.2	206408.0	−5980.9	212388.9
Ukraine	174919.0	−3838.0	184268.0	5511.0	178757.0
Ethiopia	142605.3	−21092.6	163284.5	−413.4	163697.9
Morocco	142288.8	1179.4	138989.9	−2119.5	141109.4
Slovakia	123675.8	−9117.8	129363.5	−3430.1	132793.6
Ecuador	118390.5	−454.4	116176.1	−2668.7	118844.8
Kenya	116406.4	8965.9	105674.4	−1766.1	107440.6
Dominican Republic	109970.1	−11474.2	116006.7	−5437.6	121444.3
Oman	100047.1	−8145.4	100551.0	−7641.5	108192.5
Guatemala	98164.7	−3885.8	100245.8	−1804.7	102050.5
Bulgaria	92955.1	−8629.3	98154.8	−3429.6	101584.4
Uzbekistan	86005.4	−4883.8	90128.1	−761.0	90889.1
Puerto Rico	80926.1	−36976.2	81550.7	−36351.6	117902.3
Panama	80479.7	−2902.7	80057.3	−3325.1	83382.4
Ghana	79823.5	3453.1	75420.4	−950.0	76370.4
Croatia	79658.8	−3030.0	82762.1	73.3	82688.8
Tanzania	79293.0	134.8	77758.4	−1399.9	79158.3
Angola	78319.3	−6403.7	77036.1	−7686.8	84723.0
Sri Lanka	77922.9	−6434.0	81623.4	−2733.4	84356.9
Ivory Coast	77059.7	−1729.1	75606.1	−3182.7	78788.8
Costa Rica	72207.0	−14291.0	79835.0	−6662.9	86497.9
Belarus	71440.1	−417.3	69257.3	−2600.1	71857.4
Lithuania	71291.2	−6545.2	75164.4	−2672.0	77836.4
Azerbaijan	67529.1	−4827.1	69157.1	−3199.1	72356.2
Democratic Republic of the Congo	67082.2	699.0	64288.3	−2095.0	66383.3
Uruguay	66854.0	−10386.8	71856.3	−5384.6	77240.8
Serbia	66392.7	−8794.5	71011.8	−4175.3	75187.1
Myanmar	65964.1	1149.1	63663.6	−1151.4	64815.0
Slovenia	64938.3	−3278.5	67196.3	−1020.5	68216.8
Turkmenistan	59682.1	−205.2	59381.9	−505.5	59887.3
Luxembourg	59083.3	−26671.7	58922.1	−26832.9	85755.0
Libya	52179.3	1687.6	50562.0	70.3	50491.7
Jordan	50512.7	−301.0	50351.8	−461.8	50813.6
Sudan	47595.1	−61731.9	108427.0	−900.0	109327.0
Uganda	47399.0	−1873.9	48300.2	−972.7	49272.9
Cameroon	47320.1	−625.5	46953.4	−992.1	47945.5
Tunisia	46907.4	−1622.2	47219.7	−1309.9	48529.6
Bolivia	44649.2	−1200.7	44844.2	−1005.6	45849.8
Paraguay	42537.6	−418.6	41585.0	−1371.3	42956.3
Nepal	42332.9	1424.8	41385.1	477.0	40908.1
Bahrain	42014.0	−1191.0	40659.8	−2545.2	43205.0
Latvia	41337.1	−2290.0	42515.0	−1112.1	43627.1
Estonia	37217.0	−3527.9	39377.3	−1367.6	40744.8
Iceland	31424.8	404.8	31707.5	687.5	31020.0
El Salvador	31320.4	−2695.2	31874.0	−2141.6	34015.6
Honduras	30718.6	−3681.9	31872.8	−2527.7	34400.5
Cambodia	30702.3	−1070.5	30819.4	−953.4	31772.8
Senegal	29421.1	−1592.9	29981.0	−1033.0	31014.0
Papua New Guinea	29337.9	−1594.6	29106.1	−1826.4	30932.5
Zimbabwe	29075.3	2537.0	26187.2	−351.0	26538.3
Cyprus	28780.3	−3449.3	28974.2	−3255.4	32229.6
Trinidad and Tobago	27538.8	−601.2	27093.9	−1046.0	28139.9
Zambia	27196.3	−966.3	27020.1	−1142.6	28162.6
Bosnia and Herzegovina	26211.2	−843.7	26986.0	−68.9	27054.9
Georgia	25119.5	−5416.0	28505.4	−2030.1	30535.5
Palestine	21800.7	4404.4	20858.3	3462.0	17396.3
Albania	20773.7	−2204.0	22674.9	−302.8	22977.7
Haiti	20425.7	574.8	19855.1	4.3	19850.8
Botswana	20389.2	993.5	19153.4	−242.4	19395.8
Armenia	20363.8	−3848.4	23567.1	−645.0	24212.1
Mali	20055.6	−849.3	19940.5	−964.4	20904.9
Benin	19699.6	26.3	19549.8	−123.5	19673.3
Burkina Faso	19697.5	−627.1	19484.8	−839.9	20324.6
Gabon	19393.8	−1122.4	18421.3	−2094.9	20516.1
Guinea	19271.1	−4341.2	21019.3	−2593.0	23612.3
Malta	18940.1	−2016.9	19088.4	−1868.6	20957.0
Mozambique	17880.1	−2744.5	18787.4	−1837.2	20624.6
Jamaica	17385.2	−2038.1	18894.1	−529.2	19423.4
Mongolia	17068.9	−2803.3	17982.8	−1889.4	19872.2
Guyana	16572.5	−213.8	15206.3	−1580.0	16786.3
Niger	16303.3	−515.9	16182.4	−636.8	16819.2
Laos	16195.4	352.2	14685.7	−1157.5	15843.2
Nicaragua	16015.9	−1813.4	16935.0	−894.2	17829.2
Madagascar	15926.5	−105.2	15703.0	−328.7	16031.7
Brunei	15825.3	697.0	15322.3	194.0	15128.3
Moldova	15192.2	−1347.2	16749.2	209.8	16539.4
Republic of the Congo	15080.9	−240.2	14485.8	−835.3	15321.1
Tajikistan	14584.5	2523.9	15143.8	3083.1	12060.6
Mauritius	14539.1	141.9	14752.7	355.6	14397.1
North Macedonia	13879.1	−882.2	13952.0	−809.2	14761.2
Rwanda	13853.0	−244.7	13817.6	−280.1	14097.8
Malawi	13395.3	−689.1	13726.2	−358.2	14084.3
Bahamas	13200.7	−1137.8	13626.7	−711.8	14338.5
Chad	12999.9	−149.4	12956.6	−192.7	13149.3
Namibia	12676.7	325.6	11781.6	−569.4	12351.0
Kyrgyzstan	12065.6	−1922.0	13295.7	−691.9	13987.6
Somalia	11137.4	−542.4	11635.8	−44.0	11679.8
Kosovo	10505.2	66.9	10636.2	197.8	10438.4
Mauritania	10453.5	1.0	10443.3	−9.3	10452.6
Togo	9323.2	151.9	9210.7	39.4	9171.3
Equatorial Guinea	8988.7	−3128.2	8682.0	−3435.0	12116.9
Montenegro	7088.6	−315.9	7477.5	72.9	7404.5
Barbados	6000.8	−392.7	6126.6	−267.0	6393.6
Maldives	5745.3	−854.7	5777.2	−822.8	6600.0
Fiji	5221.7	−273.1	5113.3	−381.5	5494.8
Sierra Leone	4921.8	1111.9	4395.3	585.5	3809.8
Eswatini	4674.2	76.3	4289.4	−308.5	4597.9
Liberia	3950.9	−381.1	4058.0	−274.0	4332.0
Djibouti	3921.8	−176.8	4006.5	−92.0	4098.5
Suriname	3342.8	−439.6	3474.5	−307.9	3782.4
Burundi	3032.6	390.4	2648.0	5.8	2642.2
Belize	2955.1	−326.4	3170.4	−111.1	3281.5
Timor-Leste	2904.9	661.8	2581.3	338.2	2243.1
Central African Republic	2710.7	155.2	2706.5	151.0	2555.5
Lesotho	2700.2	654.2	2393.9	347.9	2046.0
Cape Verde	2561.8	−25.4	2577.5	−9.8	2587.3
Gambia	2308.4	−31.5	2309.3	−30.6	2339.9
Saint Lucia	2235.6	−284.4	2304.5	−215.4	2519.9
Seychelles	2029.0	−112.5	2124.7	−16.8	2141.5
Guinea-Bissau	1943.5	−23.0	1993.6	27.1	1966.5
Antigua and Barbuda	1884.7	−148.4	1940.1	−93.0	2033.1
Solomon Islands	1680.0	48.7	1656.4	25.1	1631.3
Comoros	1362.9	10.5	1355.2	2.8	1352.4
Grenada	1236.5	−83.9	1237.4	−82.9	1320.3
Vanuatu	1224.7	98.4	1281.0	154.7	1126.3
Turks and Caicos Islands	1224.0	−178.1	1342.5	−59.6	1402.1
Saint Vincent and the Grenadines	1043.8	−22.2	1058.6	−7.4	1066.0
Saint Kitts and Nevis	1020.9	−56.1	1049.2	−27.8	1077.0
Samoa	908.2	−25.9	922.4	−11.7	934.1
Dominica	651.2	−2.8	655.8	1.8	654.0
São Tomé and Príncipe	573.9	−29.4	610.8	7.5	603.2
Kiribati	497.8	218.8	467.5	188.5	279.0
Federated States of Micronesia	478.6	18.6	504.3	44.3	460.0
Marshall Islands	318.0	34.0	324.8	40.8	284.0
Nauru	282.3	128.2	262.4	108.3	154.1
Palau	257.3	−5.8	269.8	6.7	263.0
Tuvalu	86.0	23.8	84.2	21.9	62.3

=== Lists of GNI per capita ===
- List of countries by GNI (real) per capita
- List of countries by GNI (nominal) per capita
- List of countries by GNI (PPP) per capita
- List of countries by GNI per capita growth

== History and name change ==
The modern concept of GNP, along with GDP, was first developed by Simon Kuznets for a 1934 U.S. Congress report. Countries like the US and the UK originally preferred GNP as a measure of economic activity while other like Norway preferred GDP. Over time economists settled on using GDP, the US switched to using GDP in 1991.

GNP was defined in the United Nations' 1953 System of National Accounts (SNA) as:

"the market value of product before deduction of provisions of consumption of fixed capital, attributable to factors of production supplied by normal residents of the given country"

Despite framing GNP as a concept of production, the attribution of the value was defined by the income earned by the owner of the factor of production.

In the 1993 revision to the SNA, the GNP definition was reframed from the point of view of the residents receiving income rather than the point of view of the factor of production. To reflect this, GNP was renamed GNI; the "national" part was kept as it is embedded in economic usage, even though the same concept of residence is used to define both GDP and GNI.

GNP continues to be used in the National income and product accounts to refer to GNI calculated for expenditure data.

== Type of income included in GNI ==
GNI includes the salaries and wages of cross-border commuters and seasonal workers working overseas but does not include remittance sent by workers to their families overseas. This explains why France GNI is higher than its GDP as a lot of French residents work in Luxembourg, Monaco, or Switzerland. In comparison, India GNI is lower than its GDP despite being the larger receiver of remittances.

GNI also includes the propriety income: rent, interest, and "profit". The "profit" included both distributed income of corporations (dividends) and reinvested earnings on foreign direct investment, those are profit retained by the corporation. Like in the IMF balance of payments manual they are treated as if they were distributed to foreign direct investors in proportion to their ownership of the equity of the enterprise and then reinvested by them using additions in equity.

The GNI of EU countries also included subsidies received from the EU and excluded tariffs as the EU receives those.

GNI contrasts with Gross national disposable income which includes all current transfer income like international cooperation and remittance.

== GNI (Atlas method) PPP ==
PPP – millions of international dollars (top 15)

Rank	2023		2022		2021		2020		2019		2018		2017		2016		2015		2014		2013	
1	China	34,388,534	China	31,576,043	China	28,620,862	China	25,044,516	China	24,232,656	China	22,355,235	China	20,567,696	China	19,169,812	United States	18,608,138	United States	17,984,237	United States	17,140,708
2	United States	27,525,100	United States	25,926,000	United States	23,777,600	United States	21,479,588	United States	21,760,847	United States	20,883,383	United States	19,837,150	United States	18,983,369	China	18,129,539	China	17,445,351	China	16,241,642
3	India	14,324,038	India	12,858,238	India	11,250,341	India	9,639,773	India	9,837,436	India	9,131,972	India	8,264,362	India	7,706,181	India	7,120,994	India	6,732,248	India	6,416,831
4	Japan	6,554,254	Japan	6,254,021	Japan	5,866,681	Japan	5,554,842	Japan	5,616,185	Japan	5,548,453	Japan	5,456,930	Japan	5,338,419	Japan	5,404,453	Japan	5,221,591	Japan	5,194,308
5	Russia	6,366,121	Russia	5,884,375	Russia	5,598,676	Germany	4,952,942	Germany	5,021,459	Germany	4,730,328	Germany	4,491,248	Germany	4,268,496	Germany	3,977,709	Germany	3,883,390	Germany	3,712,582
6	Germany	6,092,387	Germany	5,799,414	Germany	5,351,636	Russia	4,542,377	Russia	4,434,791	Russia	4,128,705	Russia	3,705,398	Russia	3,440,587	Russia	3,428,610	Russia	3,639,325	Russia	3,611,853
7	Brazil	4,325,589	Brazil	4,055,711	France	3,728,403	France	3,370,362	France	3,527,047	France	3,197,838	France	3,050,429	France	2,924,693	Brazil	2,932,875	Brazil	3,107,798	Brazil	3,077,182
8	France	4,235,079	France	3,984,079	Brazil	3,669,595	Brazil	3,289,682	United Kingdom	3,332,513	Brazil	3,098,566	United Kingdom	3,009,162	Brazil	2,846,198	France	2,777,205	France	2,719,730	France	2,666,952
9	Indonesia	4,221,517	Indonesia	3,870,444	United Kingdom	3,561,213	United Kingdom	3,151,687	Brazil	3,244,271	United Kingdom	3,087,113	Brazil	2,924,571	United Kingdom	2,824,431	United Kingdom	2,706,923	United Kingdom	2,619,025	United Kingdom	2,516,787
10	United Kingdom	3,974,003	United Kingdom	3,866,883	Indonesia	3,434,771	Indonesia	3,134,896	Indonesia	3,166,892	Indonesia	2,978,437	Indonesia	2,766,769	Indonesia	2,628,825	Indonesia	2,538,121	Indonesia	2,518,157	Indonesia	2,448,797
11	Turkey	3,729,107	Italy	3,324,775	Italy	2,988,508	Italy	2,660,830	Italy	2,797,692	Italy	2,629,049	Italy	2,531,220	Italy	2,427,622	Mexico	2,251,300	Mexico	2,200,816	Italy	2,183,587
12	Italy	3,446,469	Turkey	3,227,873	Turkey	2,627,527	Mexico	2,375,085	Mexico	2,564,439	Mexico	2,538,888	Mexico	2,464,263	Mexico	2,393,565	Italy	2,225,429	Italy	2,200,447	Mexico	2,088,045
13	Mexico	3,207,460	Mexico	2,972,064	Mexico	2,608,640	Turkey	2,362,958	Turkey	2,313,729	Turkey	2,271,021	Turkey	2,235,991	Turkey	2,094,056	Turkey	1,999,739	Turkey	1,844,207	South Korea	1,737,910
14	South Korea	2,846,253	South Korea	2,706,619	South Korea	2,542,823	South Korea	2,360,461	South Korea	2,290,264	South Korea	2,229,385	South Korea	2,112,226	South Korea	2,034,378	South Korea	1,939,637	South Korea	1,801,276	Saudi Arabia	1,730,115
15	Spain	2,535,604	Canada	2,384,385	Canada	2,114,747	Spain	1,850,441	Spain	2,065,307	Spain	1,908,195	Spain	1,843,464	Spain	1,738,407	Spain	1,621,469	Saudi Arabia	1,777,122	Turkey	1,688,340

== Gross national product ==
Gross national product (GNP) is the market value of all the goods and services produced in one year by labor and property supplied by the citizens of a country. Unlike gross domestic product (GDP), which defines production based on the geographical location of production, GNP indicates allocated production based on location of ownership. In fact it calculates income by the location of ownership and residence, and so its name is also the less ambiguous gross national income.

GNP is an economic statistic that is equal to GDP plus any income earned by residents from overseas investments minus income earned within the domestic economy by overseas residents.

GNP does not distinguish between qualitative improvements in the state of the technical arts (e.g., increasing computer processing speeds), and quantitative increases in goods (e.g., number of computers produced), and considers both to be forms of "economic growth".

When a country's capital or labour resources are employed outside its borders, or when a foreign firm is operating in its territory, GDP and GNP can produce different measures of total output. In 2009 for instance, the United States estimated its GDP at $14.119 trillion, and its GNP at $14.265 trillion.

The term gross national income (GNI) has gradually replaced the Gross national product (GNP) in international statistics. While being conceptually identical, the precise calculation method has evolved at the same time as the name change.

=== Use of GNP ===
The United States used GNP as its primary measure of total economic activity until 1991, when it began to use GDP. In making the switch, the Bureau of Economic Analysis (BEA) noted both that GDP provided an easier comparison of other measures of economic activity in the United States and that "virtually all other countries have already adopted GDP as their primary measure of production". Many economists have questioned how meaningful GNP or GDP is as a measure of a nation's economic well-being, as it does not count most unpaid work and counts much economic activity that is unproductive or actually destructive.

=== GNI vs GDP ===
While GDP measures the market value of all final goods and services produced in a given country, GNI measures income generated by the country's citizens, regardless of the geographic location of the income. In many states, those two figures are close, as the difference between income received by the country versus payments made to the rest of the world is not significant. According to the World Bank, the GNI of the US in 2016 was 1.5% higher than GDP.

In developing countries, on the other hand, the difference might be significant due to a large amount of foreign aid and capital inflow. In 2016, the GNI of Armenia was 4.45% higher than GDP. Based on the OECD reports, in 2015 alone, Armenia has received a total of US$409 million development assistance. Over the past 25 years, USAID has provided more than one billion USD to improve the living of the people in Armenia. GNI equals GDP plus wages, salaries, and property income of the country's residents earned abroad that also constitutes the higher GNI figure. According to the UN report on migration from Armenia in 2015–17, every year around 15–20 thousand people leave Armenia permanently, and roughly 47% of those are working migrants that leave the country to earn income and sustain the families left in Armenia. In 2016 Armenian residents received in a total of around $150 million remittances. Armenia's GNI, measured in US dollars, amounted to US$13.5 billion in 2021, according to the National Statistical Office. This is an 8.23% increase over the prior year. GNI in USD terms in Armenia has historically ranged from a record high of US$13.8 billion in 2019 to a record low of US$1.06 billion in 1992. Regarding interest rates on GNI expressed in USD, Armenia is ranked 119th out of the 155 monitored nations.

=== Lists of GNI per capita ===
- List of countries by GNI (nominal) per capita
- List of countries by GNI (real) per capita
- List of countries by GNI (PPP) per capita
- List of countries by GNI per capita growth

== See also ==
- Household income
- Net national income
- Measures of national income and output
- Gross national income in the European Union
- Gross world product
- National average salary
- Gross domestic product
- Irish modified GNI (or GNI*)
- List of U.S. states by adjusted per capita personal income (2022)
- List of sovereign states in Europe by GNI (PPP) per capita
- High-income economy
