= Atlas method =

Method of estimating size of economies

The World Bank has used the Atlas method since 1993 to estimate the economic size of countries based on their gross national income (GNI) in U.S. dollars and List of countries by GNI (real) per capita.

To convert a country's GNI from its local currency to U.S. dollars, the Atlas method uses a conversion factor that averages exchange rates over three years. This helps reduce the effect of temporary exchange rate changes. Additionally, it adjusts for differences in inflation rates between the country (using its GDP deflator) and several developed countries (using a weighted average of their GDP deflators in Special Drawing Rights, or SDR, terms). The converted GNI in U.S. dollars is then divided by the country's midyear population to determine GNI per capita.

The World Bank prefers the Atlas method for comparing the economic sizes of countries. It is used to categorize countries into low, middle, and high-income groups and to determine their eligibility for loans. This method helps avoid abrupt changes in country classification due to short-term economic fluctuations.

Comparison of GNI (Atlas method) and GNI 2016 World Bank (millions of current US$)
No.	Country	GNI (Atlas method)	GNI	Difference
1	United States	18,357,322	18,968,714	-611,392
2	China	11,374,227	11,154,194	220,033
3	Japan	4,816,892	5,096,371	-279,479
4	Germany	3,624,638	3,536,579	88,058
5	United Kingdom	2,778,488	2,587,657	190,831
6	France	2,590,030	2,504,684	85,346
7	India	2,212,306	2,235,524	-23,218
8	Italy	1,923,095	1,863,085	60,011
9	Brazil	1,835,993	1,758,527	77,466
10	Canada	1,584,177	1,508,495	75,682

== See also ==
- List of countries by GNI (nominal) per capita
- High-income economy
