= LRD =

LRD can stand for:

== Places ==
- Laredo International Airport (IATA airport code LRD), Laredo, Webb County, Texas, USA
  - Laredo Air Force Base
- Light Rail Depot stop, Hong Kong
- Little Red Dot, Singapore's nickname
- London Road (Guildford) railway station (National Rail station code LRD), Surrey, England, UK

== Groups, organizations ==
- Great Lakes and Ohio River Division (LRD) of the United States Army Corps of Engineers
- Labour Research Department, a British organisation
- Laird plc (stock ticker LRD), a British electronics and tech company
- Lansing Roller Derby, Lansing, Michigan, USA; a roller derby league
- Llanelly Railway and Dock Company (LR&D), a British railroad company

=== Music groups ===
- Les Rallizes Dénudés, Japan
- Les Rythmes Digitales, England

== Research and development ==
- Literature-based discovery (LBD) or literature-related discovery (LRD), a form of knowledge extraction and automated hypothesis generation
- Long-range dependency (LRD), in statistics
- Large deviations (lrd), in probability theory; see catalog of articles in probability theory
- Left–right discrimination (LRD) in body relative direction
- Lifestyle-related diseases (LRD) in lifestyle medicine

== Other uses ==
- Landing and Recovery Director
- DNAH11 or "lrd" (genetics), the gene encoding for 'left-right dynein'
- Liberian dollar (ISO 4217 currency code LRD), a currency in Liberia
- Little red dot (cosmological object), a type of cosmological object
- L-rd, an alternate spelling of "Lord" in English in Judaism
- Anti-Money Laundering Act (Switzerland) (Italian: Legge federale relativa alla lotta contro il riciclaggio di denaro e il finanziamento del terrorismo; "LRD")

== See also ==
- Lord (disambiguation)
- IRD (disambiguation)
