= Per capita income =

Average income of an economy

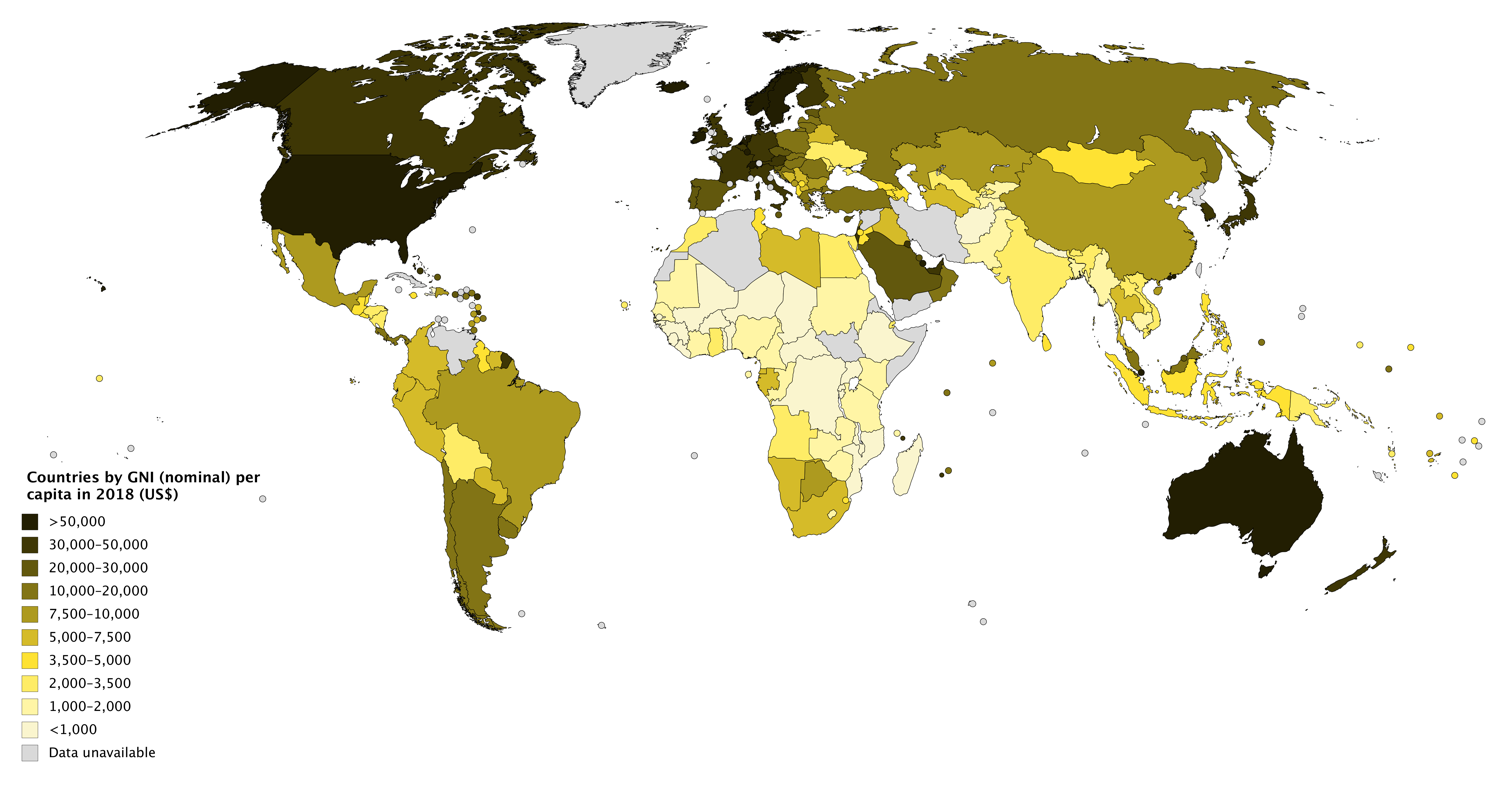
Nominal gross national income per capita as of 2018, according to the World Bank

Per capita income (PCI) or average income measures the average income earned per person in a given area (city, region, country, etc.) in a specified year.

In many countries, per capita income is determined using regular population surveys, such as the American Community Survey. This allows the calculation of per capita income for both the country as a whole and specific regions or demographic groups. However, comparing per capita income across different countries is often difficult, since methodologies, definitions and data quality can vary greatly. Since the 1990s, the OECD has conducted regular surveys among its 38 member countries using a standardized methodology and set of questions.

Per capita income is often used to measure a sector's average income and compare the wealth of different populations. Per capita income is also often used to measure a country's standard of living. When used to compare income levels of different countries, it is usually expressed using a commonly used international currency, such as the euro or United States dollar. It is one of the three components of the Human Development Index of a country.

== Limitations ==
While per capita income can be useful for many economic studies, it is important to keep in mind its limitations.

- Comparisons of per capita income over time need to consider inflation. Without adjusting for inflation, figures tend to overstate the effects of economic growth.
- International comparisons can be distorted by cost of living differences not reflected in exchange rates. Where the objective is to compare living standards between countries, adjusting for differences in purchasing power parity will more accurately reflect what people are actually able to buy with their money.
- It is a mean value and does not reflect income distribution. If a country's income distribution is skewed, a small wealthy class can increase per capita income substantially while the majority of the population has no change in income. In this respect, median income is more useful when measuring of prosperity than per capita income, as it is less influenced by outliers.
- Non-monetary activity, such as barter or services provided within the family, is usually not counted. The importance of these services varies widely among economies.
- Per capita income does not consider whether income is invested in factors likely to improve the area's development, such as health, education, or infrastructure.

== See also ==
- Household income
- List of countries by average wage
- List of countries by GDP (nominal) per capita—GDP at market or government official exchange rates per inhabitant
- List of countries by GDP (PPP) per capita—GDP calculated at purchasing power parity (PPP) exchange per inhabitant
- List of countries by GNI (nominal) per capita
- List of countries by GNI (PPP) per capita
- Real income
- List of countries by GNI per capita growth
- List of countries by income inequality
- Total personal income
- List of U.S. states by adjusted per capita personal income (2022)
