= Virus Pathogen Database and Analysis Resource =

VIPR BRC
- VIPR logo
- Website: www.viprbrc.org

The Virus Pathogen Database and Analysis Resource (ViPR) is an integrative and comprehensive publicly available database and analysis resource to search, analyze, visualize, save and share data for viral pathogens in the U.S. National Institute of Allergy and Infectious Diseases (NIAID) Category A-C Priority Pathogen lists for biodefense research, and other viral pathogens causing emerging/reemerging infectious diseases. ViPR is one of the five Bioinformatics Resource Centers (BRC) funded by NIAID, a component of the National Institutes of Health (NIH), which is an agency of the United States Department of Health and Human Services.

== Virus families covered in ViPR ==
The ViPR database includes genomes from these viral families: Arenaviridae, Bunyaviridae, Caliciviridae, Coronaviridae, Filoviridae, Flaviviridae, Hepeviridae, Herpesviridae, Paramyxoviridae, Picornaviridae, Poxviridae, Reoviridae, Rhabdoviridae, and Togaviridae.

== Data types in ViPR ==
- Genomes
- Genome annotations
- Genes & proteins
- Predicted protein domains and motifs
- Immune epitopes
- Sequence Features
- Orthologous protein clusters
- 3D protein structure
- Clinical metadata
- Host factor data

== Analysis and visualization tools in ViPR ==
- BLAST: provides a variety of custom ViPR databases to identify the most related sequence(s)
- Short Peptide Search: allows users to find any peptide sequence using exact, fuzzy, or pattern matching
- Sequence Variation Analysis ([Single-nucleotide polymorphism] SNP): calculates sequence variation existing in the specified sequences
- Metadata-driven Comparative Analysis Tool for Sequences (Meta-CATS): an automated comparative statistical analysis to identify positions throughout a multiple sequence alignment that significantly differ between groups of sequences possessing specific phenotypic characteristic
- Multiple Sequence Alignment: aligns small genomes, gene/protein sequences or large viral genome sequences using one of several algorithm best-suited for the specific job submission
- Sequence Alignment Visualization: uses JalView for sequence alignment visualization
- Phylogenetic Tree Generation: calculates a tree using one of several available algorithms and evolutionary models
- Phylogenetic Tree Visualization: allows the color-coded display of strain metadata on a tree using the Archaeopteryx viewer
- GBrowse: provides genome browsing capability for large DNA viral genomes (Herpesviridae and Poxviridae) with integration of ViPR Sequence Features for Vaccinia virus
- Sequence Feature Variant Type (SFVT) analysis: provides a centralized repository of functional regions and automatically calculates all observed sequence variation within each defined region
- 3D Protein Structure Visualization: integrates PDB protein structure files with ViPR Sequence Features when applicable and provides an interactive 3D protein structure viewer using Jmol
- Genome Annotator (GATU): allows users to annotate new genome sequences provided by the user
- Genotype Determination and Recombination Detection: predicts the genotype for user-provided sequences and identifies possible sites of recombination for viruses in the family Flaviviridae
- PCR Primer Design: allows the user to automatically predict ideal primers based on a sequence and specified parameters
- ReadSeq: converts between various sequence formats
- Sequence Feature Submission Tool: allows users to define a Sequence Feature by filling out a webform
- External Analysis Tools: displays a list and description of third-party tools for more specialized analyses
- Personal Workbench to save and share data and analysis
