= List of countries by GNI (PPP) per capita =

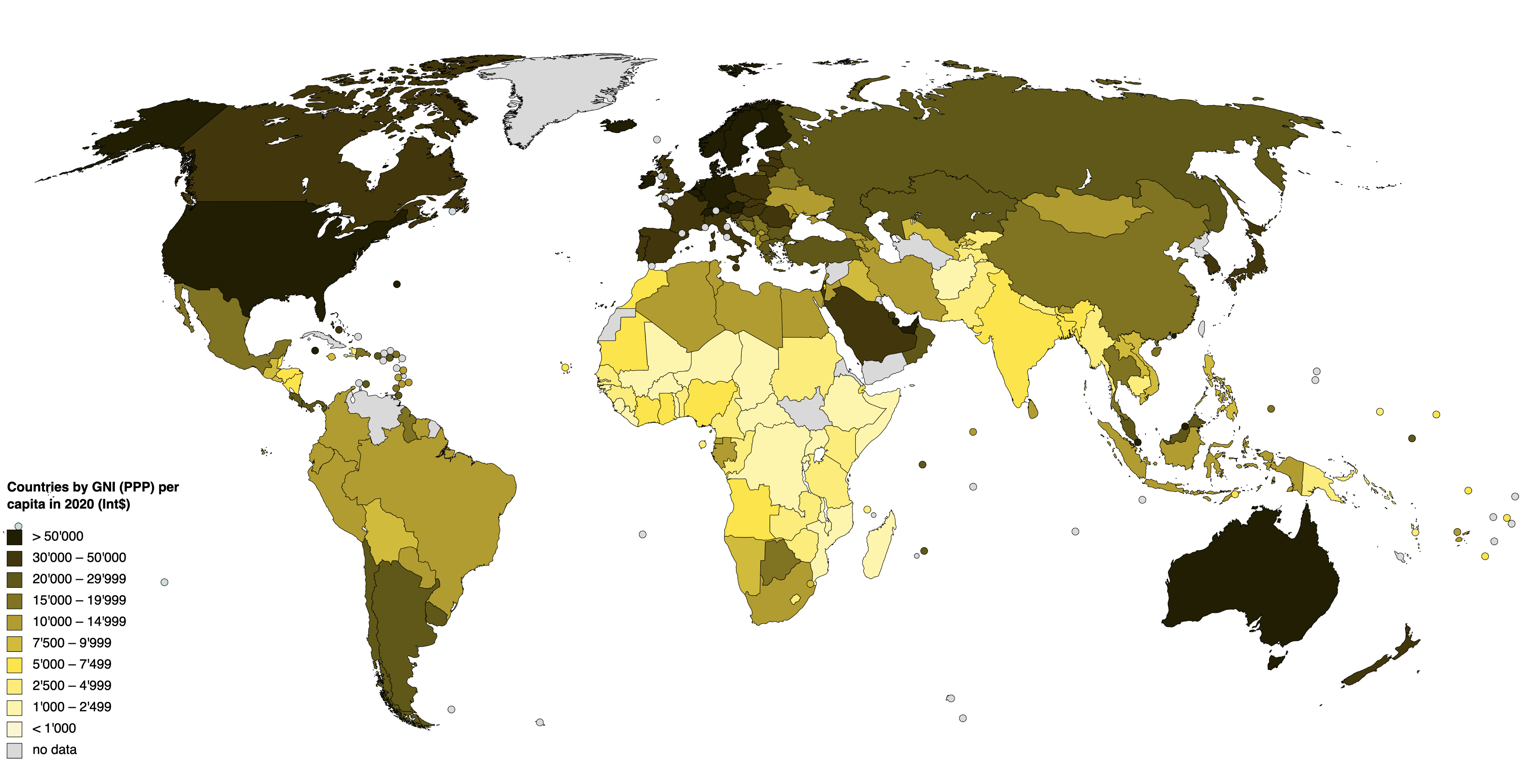
Countries by GNI (PPP) per capita in 2016

This article includes a list of countries by their gross national income (GNI) per capita at purchasing power parity (PPP) in 2023–24, as reported by the World Bank. Further down is a list from the World Inequality Database.

== Definitions ==
According to the International Comparison Program, World Bank:

"GNI is the sum of value added by all resident producers plus any product taxes (less subsidies) not included in the valuation of output plus net receipts of primary income (compensation of employees and property income) from abroad."

"PPP conversion factor is a spatial price deflator and currency converter that eliminates the effects of the differences in price levels between countries. Typically, higher income countries have higher price levels, while lower income countries have lower price levels (Balassa–Samuelson effect). Market exchange rate-based cross-country comparisons of GDP at its expenditure components reflect both differences in economic outputs (volumes) and prices. Given the differences in price levels, the size of higher income countries is inflated, while the size of lower income countries is depressed in the comparison. PPP-based cross-country comparisons of GDP at its expenditure components only reflect differences in economic outputs (volume), as PPPs control for price level differences between the countries. Hence, the comparison reflects the real size of the countries."

== Country or dependency ==
By country or dependency (2023–24)
Country / dependency	GNI PPP per capita (Int$) (Current)	2000	2010	2020	Growth rate	Absolute growth
Bermuda (UK)	129,100	–	72,190	88,330	3.78%	4,258.170
Singapore	126,190	43,510	74,590	87,750	4.46%	5,294.466
Qatar	121,930	81,730	128,290	81,400	1.64%	1,916.668
Macau (CN)	113,320	31,740	88,060	67,970	3.88%	2,839.384
Luxembourg	107,100	48,770	61,400	85,800	3.10%	3,053.190
Norway	105,770	36,480	58,850	69,890	4.87%	5,298.073
Ireland	99,180	26,340	36,320	73,470	5.91%	5,830.215
Brunei	92,750	66,220	78,220	72,820	1.22%	1,068.110
Switzerland	91,100	39,020	57,260	70,510	3.70%	3,332.960
United States	85,980	36,810	49,090	64,790	3.55%	2,917.745
Faroe Islands (DK)	83,290	–	40,420	63,410	4.69%	3,692.906
Hong Kong (CN)	82,320	28,450	50,240	61,580	4.48%	3,489.024
Netherlands	83,040	31,680	44,640	59,070	4.03%	3,094.450
Denmark	82,240	28,010	43,700	64,600	4.63%	3,675.757
Iceland	81,740	28,840	33,710	57,640	4.50%	3,568.050
United Arab Emirates	81,530	102,160	67,750	65,800	−0.86%	−720.250
Andorra	76,090	–	–	58,660	5.93%	4,452.837
Germany	74,880	27,050	39,730	59,560	4.69%	3,415.996
Sweden	74,150	29,640	43,360	59,780	4.00%	2,919.600
Belgium	73,470	28,500	40,440	56,330	4.11%	2,958.789
Austria	71,860	29,120	42,350	59,220	4.11%	3,021.672
San Marino	71,860	–	–	50,960	5.16%	3,045.432
Saudi Arabia	71,730	38,270	49,340	40,430	1.61%	890.169
Australia	68,800	25,780	37,840	52,840	4.21%	2,786.294
Cayman Islands (UK)	68,800	–	62,800	46,070	−0.36%	−216.432
Finland	64,540	26,620	39,450	54,540	3.95%	2,565.130
Canada	64,470	28,590	39,310	48,240	3.33%	2,021.310
Kuwait	63,270	69,840	81,320	46,650	−0.13%	−88.049
France	62,590	26,500	36,730	49,880	3.98%	2,528.301
Bahrain	62,230	38,390	43,510	47,790	1.97%	1,183.773
Malta	61,320	17,670	27,240	41,650	5.21%	2,963.448
Italy	60,490	26,970	35,080	44,770	3.44%	2,017.560
United Kingdom	60,090	26,600	36,500	46,980	3.46%	2,011.644
South Korea	59,750	18,410	31,780	45,540	4.88%	2,685.952
Spain	56,590	21,430	31,220	39,070	3.97%	2,091.074
Slovenia	55,850	17,960	27,450	41,820	4.91%	2,657.783
Israel	55,250	24,170	28,830	40,670	3.50%	1,866.900
Japan	55,120	27,680	36,280	43,990	2.83%	1,489.712
Cyprus	54,660	19,460	33,030	39,810	4.31%	2,212.323
Czechia	54,230	15,920	25,790	41,730	5.23%	2,686.651
New Zealand	53,670	20,280	29,660	44,410	4.24%	2,236.600
Lithuania	53,070	8,300	19,960	39,980	8.13%	4,073.130
Guyana	52,290	5,760	9,390	16,540	9.86%	4,935.916
Sint Maarten (NL)	51,990	–	36,170	38,540	2.45%	1,157.625
Portugal	49,720	18,570	26,390	35,320	4.20%	2,009.700
Croatia	49,000	10,470	19,400	31,300	6.64%	3,051.080
Poland	48,850	10,630	20,190	34,940	6.71%	3,179.198
Estonia	48,250	9,070	20,450	39,490	7.45%	3,527.575
Aruba (NL)	47,960	30,320	32,280	29,630	1.67%	729.289
Romania	47,590	5,810	17,150	33,780	9.48%	4,419.576
Russian Federation	46,780	6,650	19,860	30,750	8.51%	3,702.701
Hungary	46,400	11,170	20,720	34,190	6.21%	2,772.765
Slovak Republic	46,110	11,330	24,870	34,700	6.02%	2,618.700
Turkey	44,600	9,360	17,200	28,340	6.93%	3,028.410
Latvia	43,040	8,030	17,880	33,730	7.39%	3,060.938
Greece	43,030	19,650	27,290	28,970	3.24%	1,324.512
Bahamas	39,550	25,320	28,980	24,100	1.26%	425.754
Bulgaria	39,420	6,270	14,640	24,850	8.07%	3,016.566
Oman	39,340	38,100	50,340	32,550	0.35%	144.480
Panama	39,260	8,360	14,600	25,890	6.82%	2,599.102
Kazakhstan	37,590	7,240	16,710	27,510	7.15%	2,532.530
Malaysia	37,450	11,980	19,510	27,480	4.92%	1,777.104
Turks and Caicos Islands (UK)	37,440	–	–	16,520	1.32%	313.632
Trinidad and Tobago	36,580	12,760	27,360	22,760	3.85%	1,170.400
Mauritius	35,100	9,110	15,910	22,340	5.35%	1,617.305
St. Kitts and Nevis	34,460	14,090	22,540	26,170	3.71%	1,207.234
Uruguay	34,170	10,810	17,060	24,170	4.79%	1,517.951
Montenegro	34,130	6,310	13,540	21,340	7.24%	2,282.048
Puerto Rico (US)	34,060	15,400	20,220	25,140	3.37%	1,111.763
Curaçao (NL)	33,300	–	25,860	21,950	1.10%	324.170
Chile	32,850	9,140	16,930	23,860	5.54%	1,750.086
Belarus	32,300	5,780	15,050	23,860	7.37%	2,184.468
Seychelles	32,180	13,930	17,940	29,950	3.74%	1,213.256
Antigua and Barbuda	30,350	18,240	22,610	22,070	2.24%	679.840
Serbia	30,210	6,020	12,520	19,450	6.55%	1,695.140
Argentina	29,800	11,240	17,450	21,700	4.16%	1,194.336
Costa Rica	27,880	7,440	12,340	20,450	5.56%	1,434.480
China	26,920	2,880	9,220	17,750	9.73%	2,372.174
Albania	26,490	3,980	9,530	14,200	7.52%	1,587.472
Georgia	26,200	3,200	7,580	16,000	8.96%	2,064.384
Dominican Republic	26,050	6,420	10,910	18,160	5.99%	1,465.154
North Macedonia	25,180	6,040	11,830	19,200	6.09%	1,431.759
Mexico	25,030	11,550	15,890	18,850	3.41%	851.477
St. Lucia	24,840	8,820	12,380	14,470	4.25%	976.650
Azerbaijan	24,220	3,320	13,800	15,070	8.70%	1,969.680
Thailand	23,960	7,140	12,450	18,780	5.19%	1,187.472
Barbados	23,850	12,630	16,190	14,480	1.69%	313.495
Maldives	23,400	8,110	11,240	12,020	4.38%	951.336
Bosnia and Herzegovina	22,910	4,520	9,240	16,180	7.29%	1,661.391
Armenia	22,020	2,650	7,700	15,280	9.73%	2,183.412
Nauru	21,970	4,970	6,650	15,360	6.59%	1,421.463
Brazil	21,590	8,740	13,820	15,430	3.66%	731.634
Dominica	21,410	5,850	10,130	12,960	4.92%	868.380
St. Vincent and the Grenadines	21,150	6,180	10,440	15,120	5.18%	1,022.532
Colombia	21,420	6,610	10,460	15,280	5.24%	1,122.408
Turkmenistan	21,020	4,070	8,680	–	7.77%	1,310.022
Botswana	20,570	8,360	11,660	14,220	3.67%	702.438
Gabon	20,400	11,430	12,240	13,860	2.40%	473.040
Suriname	20,000	7,210	12,820	14,360	4.38%	846.654
Iran	19,820	10,890	18,350	14,160	2.18%	390.220
Ukraine	18,560	3,990	8,240	16,060	6.91%	1,282.496
Moldova	18,710	3,170	6,790	13,990	7.74%	1,362.240
Palau	18,320	9,200	13,190	18,030	2.95%	529.230
Kosovo	18,290	–	7,280	10,790	5.73%	877.263
Egypt	18,320	5,610	8,850	15,040	5.20%	935.480
Grenada	18,220	6,830	9,600	12,590	3.92%	648.760
Paraguay	17,930	6,040	10,270	13,790	4.58%	774.478
Algeria	17,290	8,800	14,330	12,640	2.85%	478.515
Mongolia	17,000	3,630	7,020	12,520	6.77%	1,109.603
Peru	16,780	4,890	8,960	12,060	5.25%	832.650
Venezuela	-	11,490	16,380	–	3.60%	610.560
Indonesia	16,010	4,370	8,210	11,530	5.57%	847.197
Vietnam	15,850	2,520	5,220	11,280	7.87%	1,133.280
Ecuador	15,410	5,300	8,890	11,100	4.78%	741.378
Libya	15,400	19,680	30,250	16,470	0.00%	0.000
Bhutan	15,320	3,100	6,700	11,710	7.18%	1,022.432
Sri Lanka	15,240	4,420	8,230	12,590	5.14%	719.086
South Africa	15,150	7,980	12,520	12,850	2.97%	464.211
Iraq	14,530	10,470	12,240	10,360	1.28%	179.712
Fiji	14,490	5,790	7,290	10,460	3.91%	547.400
Tunisia	14,230	5,940	9,960	11,350	3.57%	475.167
Guatemala	14,170	4,700	6,450	11,070	4.80%	663.360
Belize	13,760	7,180	8,870	9,270	2.85%	390.735
Lebanon	12,490	8,100	14,640	15,850	1.99%	248.551
Philippines	13,300	3,760	6,210	8,850	5.15%	614.910
Jamaica	12,690	6,200	7,820	8,730	2.59%	289.044
Bolivia	12,620	3,270	4,850	8,120	5.20%	545.480
El Salvador	12,420	4,320	6,020	8,790	4.45%	522.875
Equatorial Guinea	12,330	5,210	16,690	11,080	4.20%	563.640
Uzbekistan	12,000	2,620	5,560	7,540	5.83%	562.012
Namibia	11,300	5,150	8,130	10,210	3.81%	463.677
India	11,000	2,070	4,170	6,900	7.10%	712.130
Cabo Verde	11,000	3,020	5,670	5,930	4.89%	442.545
Eswatini	10,950	4,690	7,140	8,200	3.76%	411.720
Jordan	10,360	6,080	9,840	9,500	2.34%	242.424
Morocco	10,260	3,840	6,760	7,610	4.06%	389.760
Bangladesh	10,060	1,620	3,100	6,870	7.96%	750.628
Marshall Islands	9,680	3,040	4,130	7,160	4.61%	395.077
Angola	9,460	2,790	5,950	5,880	4.28%	312.868
Laos	9,160	1,720	3,540	7,470	7.27%	628.128
Nigeria	8,850	–	4,380	5,440	3.10%	192.200
Samoa	8,620	2,850	5,030	6,140	3.72%	245.520
Tonga	8,400	3,520	4,610	7,230	3.54%	267.624
Tuvalu	8,320	3,920	4,750	6,540	3.03%	236.037
Nicaragua	8,270	2,640	3,850	5,690	4.73%	361.372
Djibouti	8,030	–	–	5,500	6.28%	442.112
Cambodia	7,910	1,040	2,330	4,320	7.48%	408.408
Kyrgyz Republic	7,900	1,750	2,890	5,130	6.04%	407.700
Ghana	7,720	2,280	3,790	6,060	5.23%	385.451
Cote d'Ivoire	7,480	1,880	2,460	5,800	6.19%	463.012
Mauritania	7,300	2,250	3,110	5,800	5.01%	347.193
Tajikistan	7,100	0,990	2,840	4,360	8.44%	538.472
Honduras	6,900	2,480	3,550	5,000	4.40%	293.920
Kenya	6,540	1,880	2,320	4,730	5.34%	332.148
Republic of the Congo	6,340	2,700	4,790	4,790	3.93%	257.415
Sao Tome and Principe	6,240	1,680	2,850	5,170	5.80%	356.120
Pakistan	6,100	2,520	3,810	5,130	3.93%	240.123
Kiribati	6,060	2,550	2,500	4,610	3.71%	218.890
Myanmar	5,890	0,940	3,320	5,590	8.23%	477.340
Zimbabwe	5,870	1,740	1,660	2,730	3.51%	135.135
Nepal	5,830	1,320	2,170	4,230	6.18%	323.832
Cameroon	5,270	1,970	2,860	4,230	4.37%	230.299
Timor-Leste	5,040	1,770	7,340	8,420	5.36%	315.168
Senegal	4,920	1,990	2,660	3,770	3.78%	176.526
Micronesia	4,690	2,450	3,240	4,110	2.80%	129.360
Palestine	4,600	3,090	4,360	6,910	3.66%	258.396
Papua New Guinea	4,580	2,120	2,720	3,810	3.16%	137.144
Syria	4480	–	–	3,370	−3.38%	−93.964
Benin	4,390	1,720	2,290	3,320	3.98%	167.956
Vanuatu	4,140	2,040	2,570	3,330	2.71%	102.167
Guinea	4,130	1,190	1,620	3,050	5.34%	210.396
Tanzania	4,130	1,150	2,020	3,190	5.45%	212.550
Comoros	3,860	1,820	2,370	3,260	3.32%	128.152
Zambia	3,850	1,660	2,930	3,090	3.85%	152.460
Rwanda	3,620	0,610	1,300	2,220	7.60%	250.040
Lesotho	3,580	1,630	2,730	3,030	3.07%	100.389
Sierra Leone	3,490	0,660	1,140	1,560	5.23%	111.399
Gambia	3,430	1,660	2,210	2,440	2.78%	86.736
Togo	3,380	1,330	1,570	2,430	3.85%	122.045
Ethiopia	3,280	0,470	1,010	2,430	8.55%	265.050
Mali	3,230	1,090	1,660	2,250	3.85%	100.100
Uganda	3,190	1,110	2,060	2,480	4.48%	136.192
Haiti	3,190	2,210	2,690	3,090	1.70%	55.420
Guinea-Bissau	3,140	0,980	1,370	2,120	4.45%	118.815
Yemen (2013)	3,020	2,540	3,670	–	1.99%	65.272
Burkina Faso	2,720	0,900	1,410	2,290	4.74%	123.714
Chad	2,710	0,760	1,770	1,600	4.16%	80.704
Solomon Islands	2,680	1,530	2,050	2,650	3.09%	95.172
Afghanistan	2,210	0,810	1,770	2,590	4.43%	93.030
Sudan	2,050	2,590	3,680	3,330	0.80%	24.880
Niger	2,030	0,790	1,110	1,400	3.52%	61.600
Madagascar	1,830	1,230	1,470	1,490	1.77%	32.568
Malawi	1,830	0,980	1,450	1,520	2.73%	49.686
DR Congo	1,760	0,420	590	1,140	6.04%	97.848
Liberia	1,750	0,860	900	1,530	3.01%	51.170
Eritrea (2011)	1,720	1,460	1,480	–	0.89%	90.160
Somalia	1,630	0,460	820	1,560	5.60%	14.329
Mozambique	1,520	0,470	970	1,370	5.21%	78.671
Central African Republic	1,340	0,640	910	1,060	2.77%	33.240
Burundi	1,200	0,540	630	820	2.49%	23.655

== World regions or income levels ==
By world region or income level (2023)
World region	GNI PPP per capita (Int$)	2000	2010	2020	Growth rate
North America	79,894	36,003	48,126	63,091	3.53%
High income	63,398	25,053	37,058	49,497	4.12%
Europe & Central Asia	49,423	15,839	25,958	37,457	5.07%
East Asia & Pacific	25,049	5,731	11,771	19,059	6.62%
World	22,855	7,981	12,816	17,656	4.68%
Upper middle income	22,816	5,086	10,905	16,889	6.74%
Latin America & Caribbean	21,121	8,505	12,965	15,979	4.03%
Middle East & North Africa	20,625	11,391	16,932	16,262	2.62%
Middle income	15,724	3,786	7,646	11,761	6.39%
South Asia	9,291	2,076	4,013	6,624	6.73%
Lower middle income	9,196	2,336	4,321	6,895	6.14%
Sub−Saharan Africa	4,713	2,077	3,145	3,918	3.63%
Low income	2,355	929	1,493	2,020	4.13%

== Other country groups ==
By other country group (2023)
Country group	GNI PPP per capita (Int$)	2000	2010	2020	Growth rate
Euro area	62,766	25,050	35,647	49,365	4.07%
European Union	60,260	21,985	32,808	47,020	4.48%
OECD members	59,083	24,771	34,650	46,344	3.85%
Central Europe and the Baltics	46,609	9,865	20,123	34,835	6.98%
Other small states	30,303	11,507	18,254	23,793	4.30%
Caribbean small states	28,910	9,998	14,054	15,897	4.72%
Small states	27,122	10,225	15,794	20,250	4.33%
Arab World	17,736	10,033	14,564	14,195	2.51%
Pacific island small states	7,990	3,778	4,783	6,435	3.31%
Fragile and conflict affected situations	5,539	2,666	4,055	4,956	3.23%
Africa Western and Central	5,239	–	3,303	4,421	3.69%
Africa Eastern and Southern	4,355	2,050	3,038	3,575	3.33%
Least developed countries: UN classification	4,197	1,240	2,212	3,420	5.45%
Heavily indebted poor countries (HIPC)	3,344	1,239	1,916	2,742	4.41%

== List from World Inequality Database (2024 data) ==
	Location	GNI per capita (Euro PPP)	Share bottom 50%	Share top 10%	Share top 1%
1	Monaco	187,454.65	18.49%	35.67%	11.50%
2	Liechtenstein	186,564.30	18.49%	35.67%	11.50%
3	Luxembourg	179,213.19	20.46%	32.61%	10.23%
4	Guernsey	143,661.90	18.49%	35.67%	11.50%
5	Jersey	143,105.02	18.49%	35.67%	11.50%
6	Bermuda	143,005.77	16.12%	48.41%	16.03%
7	Singapore	122,549.25	18.47%	45.27%	13.90%
8	Cayman Islands	121,816.28	14.06%	48.57%	21.20%
9	Other North America (MER)	108,080.79	9.53%	52.41%	19.81%
10	Other North America (PPP)	108,080.77	13.03%	50.52%	17.73%
11	Anguilla	101,855.76	14.06%	48.57%	21.20%
12	Gibraltar	96,666.05	18.49%	35.67%	11.50%
13	Macao	95,632.04	14.84%	41.42%	13.92%
14	Isle of Man	90,457.62	18.49%	35.67%	11.50%
15	Norway	87,036.74	25.84%	29.90%	9.29%
16	Qatar	82,832.27	10.60%	56.37%	24.19%
17	Brunei Darussalam	73,311.89	21.54%	35.61%	12.77%
18	Montserrat	70,077.63	14.06%	48.57%	21.20%
19	Guyana	69,901.21	10.11%	52.12%	21.97%
20	Faroe Islands	66,829.25			
21	Channel Islands	66,739.13			
22	Ireland	66,130.72	21.35%	36.03%	12.65%
23	Denmark	63,220.58	22.85%	32.87%	12.23%
24	Greenland	63,112.92	16.12%	48.41%	16.03%
25	USA	62,212.05	13.44%	46.76%	20.73%
26	Hong Kong	61,791.98	13.71%	48.11%	17.82%
27	Switzerland	61,540.85	24.26%	30.96%	10.16%
28	United Arab Emirates	61,346.32	13.89%	48.66%	16.01%
29	North America (PPP)	60,829.31	13.64%	46.32%	20.57%
30	North America (MER)	60,829.29	13.45%	46.70%	20.67%
31	Taiwan	59,024.77	11.79%	48.12%	19.33%
32	North America & Oceania (PPP)	58,773.32	13.09%	46.58%	20.34%
33	North America & Oceania (MER)	58,773.31	13.01%	47.20%	20.73%
34	Iceland	57,261.23	27.68%	27.21%	7.76%
35	Sweden	57,047.67	25.37%	28.61%	9.39%
36	Netherlands	56,237.16	21.97%	29.96%	7.03%
37	Saudi Arabia	55,660.67	11.66%	51.46%	22.90%
38	Andorra	55,394.39	18.49%	35.67%	11.50%
39	Australia	52,733.22	17.11%	35.16%	10.95%
40	Belgium	52,526.14	21.36%	32.51%	8.58%
41	Israel	50,602.61	14.35%	48.60%	16.70%
42	British Virgin Islands	49,760.99	14.06%	48.57%	21.20%
43	US Virgin Islands	49,750.11			
44	Kuwait	49,741.61	18.61%	44.15%	17.24%
45	Germany	49,570.27	19.12%	37.49%	13.25%
46	Austria	49,511.21	24.58%	31.18%	8.74%
47	Canada	49,211.37	16.86%	33.52%	9.45%
48	Other Western Europe (PPP)	48,669.91	20.04%	35.56%	10.97%
49	Other Western Europe (MER)	48,669.90	17.39%	37.66%	11.51%
50	San Marino	48,551.77	18.49%	35.67%	11.50%
51	Bahrain	48,122.09	11.46%	57.06%	25.28%
52	France	47,519.96	20.38%	34.00%	11.80%
53	United Kingdom	46,907.77	21.45%	35.76%	12.91%
54	Malta	46,083.46	20.66%	34.96%	10.91%
55	Finland	45,285.35	24.20%	30.10%	9.24%
56	Europe (PPP)	43,346.35	19.43%	36.10%	12.06%
57	Europe (MER)	43,346.32	17.24%	37.80%	12.46%
58	Mauritius	40,424.25	15.99%	46.74%	15.67%
59	New Zealand	40,167.46	21.12%	34.70%	11.98%
60	Oceania (PPP)	39,946.99	10.40%	40.96%	12.94%
61	Oceania (MER)	39,946.99	9.51%	41.74%	13.15%
62	Italy	39,087.11	21.70%	32.24%	9.08%
63	Lithuania	39,015.69	7.67%	42.94%	12.43%
64	Puerto Rico	38,496.48	14.06%	48.57%	21.20%
65	Sint Maarten (Dutch part)	38,140.93	14.06%	48.57%	21.20%
66	Korea	38,108.04	18.38%	37.41%	13.98%
67	Spain	37,917.35	22.60%	33.44%	11.93%
68	Aruba	37,880.00	14.06%	48.57%	21.20%
69	Slovenia	36,981.51	24.23%	29.16%	7.82%
70	Panama	36,621.30	10.11%	52.12%	21.97%
71	Japan	36,498.98	18.56%	43.31%	12.59%
72	Kazakhstan	36,314.66	18.40%	40.24%	14.53%
73	Russian Federation	35,842.92	15.68%	50.77%	23.76%
74	Czech Republic	34,819.61	28.10%	28.02%	9.74%
75	Poland	34,668.17	19.50%	37.64%	15.11%
76	Estonia	33,195.48	17.87%	40.59%	16.74%
77	New Caledonia	32,948.64	16.12%	48.41%	16.03%
78	Romania	32,357.40	15.40%	41.12%	14.47%
79	Croatia	32,279.72	19.65%	34.48%	9.57%
80	Portugal	32,125.33	20.95%	35.21%	10.30%
81	Oman	31,638.64	9.57%	55.95%	19.81%
82	Turkey	31,605.25	15.18%	53.27%	21.23%
83	Slovakia	31,603.99	26.11%	26.20%	7.36%
84	Malaysia	31,347.85	20.80%	35.82%	12.74%
85	Greece	31,285.95	20.76%	33.27%	11.37%
86	Hungary	30,639.69	23.03%	32.79%	11.41%
87	Eastern Europe (MER)	30,434.43	17.47%	37.64%	13.59%
88	Eastern Europe (PPP)	30,434.41	18.22%	37.55%	13.68%
89	Bahamas	29,944.41	10.11%	52.12%	21.97%
90	Cyprus	29,940.56	22.72%	32.00%	7.84%
91	Saint Kitts and Nevis	29,303.73	14.06%	48.57%	21.20%
92	Uruguay	29,180.22	14.49%	46.55%	21.35%
93	Latvia	28,388.13	18.36%	35.04%	9.23%
94	Barbados	28,236.35	14.06%	48.57%	21.20%
95	Russia & Central Asia (PPP)	26,889.05	13.92%	50.29%	22.83%
96	Russia & Central Asia (MER)	26,889.03	12.97%	51.36%	23.37%
97	Trinidad and Tobago	25,928.45	10.11%	52.12%	21.97%
98	Dominican Republic	25,656.00	11.42%	44.69%	16.87%
99	Seychelles	25,306.54	18.47%	38.14%	8.67%
100	Antigua and Barbuda	25,222.76	14.06%	48.57%	21.20%
101	Bulgaria	24,932.43	17.31%	43.83%	18.04%
102	Argentina	24,742.15	12.21%	45.11%	18.10%
103	Montenegro	24,534.85	15.91%	35.09%	9.13%
104	Chile	24,365.84	8.18%	59.47%	26.71%
105	Costa Rica	24,187.92	8.92%	49.74%	18.14%
106	Nauru	23,467.46	16.12%	48.41%	16.03%
107	French Polynesia	23,083.70	16.12%	48.41%	16.03%
108	Turkmenistan	22,026.56	13.02%	48.36%	19.29%
109	MENA (MER)	21,946.89	7.65%	63.61%	27.45%
110	MENA (PPP)	21,946.86	10.63%	56.85%	23.56%
111	Belarus	21,458.05	25.45%	31.55%	9.25%
112	Egypt	21,437.98	17.98%	47.88%	18.58%
113	East Asia (MER)	21,418.10	12.36%	46.05%	17.92%
114	East Asia (PPP)	21,418.06	12.86%	45.59%	17.31%
115	Georgia	20,786.76	14.43%	48.73%	20.98%
116	Azerbaijan	20,755.16	23.40%	36.75%	13.45%
117	World (PPP)	20,192.13	8.50%	53.24%	20.53%
118	World (MER)	20,192.11	4.70%	63.03%	24.68%
119	Cuba	20,176.60	12.63%	45.57%	19.09%
120	Turks and Caicos Islands	20,104.84	14.06%	48.57%	21.20%
121	Curacao	20,090.53	14.06%	48.57%	21.20%
122	Mexico	19,940.18	7.69%	59.07%	25.57%
123	Mongolia	19,426.06	16.45%	42.15%	15.77%
124	Saint Lucia	19,286.58	14.06%	48.57%	21.20%
125	Other South & Southeast Asia (PPP)	19,242.92	7.57%	57.52%	23.71%
126	Other South & Southeast Asia (MER)	19,242.86	4.79%	68.90%	32.41%
127	Gabon	18,933.15	15.36%	42.84%	10.90%
128	Serbia	18,882.04	16.93%	40.32%	16.16%
129	Maldives	18,803.19	19.90%	38.63%	12.79%
130	China	18,757.19	13.74%	43.34%	15.72%
131	Equatorial Guinea	18,632.13	15.01%	44.77%	11.86%
132	Botswana	18,586.75	8.14%	60.27%	23.15%
133	Other East Asia (MER)	18,540.64	0.08%	78.82%	32.56%
134	Other East Asia (PPP)	18,540.64	2.50%	70.82%	28.74%
135	North Macedonia	18,449.61	21.29%	30.39%	8.19%
136	Armenia	17,876.63	20.91%	38.47%	14.57%
137	Saint Vincent and the Grenadines	17,809.12	14.06%	48.57%	21.20%
138	Latin America (MER)	17,685.95	7.55%	58.74%	25.21%
139	Latin America (PPP)	17,685.88	7.93%	57.76%	24.63%
140	Dominica	17,638.45	14.06%	48.57%	21.20%
141	Suriname	17,596.68	10.11%	52.12%	21.97%
142	Brazil	17,078.72	9.26%	59.12%	26.50%
143	Paraguay	16,960.25	10.11%	52.12%	21.97%
144	Bosnia and Herzegovina	16,940.31	18.66%	34.44%	9.88%
145	Colombia	16,905.79	6.61%	59.94%	22.45%
146	Other Russia & Central Asia (MER)	16,859.44	15.66%	45.40%	16.53%
147	Other Russia & Central Asia (PPP)	16,859.42	16.77%	43.02%	15.26%
148	Thailand	16,526.35	11.09%	52.10%	19.74%
149	Other MENA (PPP)	16,232.08	4.77%	67.03%	31.91%
150	Other MENA (MER)	16,232.07	3.88%	69.98%	31.40%
151	Palau	16,154.41	16.12%	48.41%	16.03%
152	Iraq	15,853.54	6.77%	70.65%	44.48%
153	Albania	15,332.92	17.74%	34.38%	9.32%
154	Peru	15,265.26	9.54%	58.10%	27.61%
155	Kosovo	14,929.03	18.24%	33.33%	9.65%
156	Algeria	14,893.24	18.08%	48.73%	22.61%
157	Guatemala	14,729.02	10.11%	52.12%	21.97%
158	Other Latin America (PPP)	14,638.99	6.75%	55.98%	23.99%
159	Other Latin America (MER)	14,638.93	6.16%	59.30%	25.48%
160	Grenada	14,548.86	14.06%	48.57%	21.20%
161	Bhutan	14,523.37	16.50%	41.41%	13.76%
162	Fiji	13,797.51	16.12%	48.41%	16.03%
163	Libya	13,796.15	16.55%	46.41%	16.49%
164	Sri Lanka	13,773.85	15.67%	48.11%	20.11%
165	Ecuador	13,729.27	11.18%	45.05%	17.83%
166	Ukraine	13,693.65	25.40%	31.88%	8.99%
167	South Africa	13,350.83	5.58%	66.33%	21.86%
168	Bonaire	13,323.16	14.06%	48.57%	21.20%
169	Viet Nam	13,310.04	15.78%	43.15%	15.52%
170	Namibia	12,940.90	6.88%	63.97%	21.50%
171	Indonesia	12,663.05	13.66%	46.21%	17.60%
172	Belize	12,588.33	10.11%	52.12%	21.97%
173	Iran	12,313.62	17.94%	45.92%	16.30%
174	Moldova	12,312.97	17.23%	37.33%	12.45%
175	Tunisia	12,134.02	12.93%	52.38%	22.27%
176	El Salvador	12,017.32	10.50%	44.13%	16.73%
177	Swaziland	11,758.08	8.38%	59.54%	19.22%
178	Tuvalu	11,572.30	16.12%	48.41%	16.03%
179	Marshall Islands	11,543.79	16.12%	48.41%	16.03%
180	Philippines	11,518.13	15.85%	44.60%	16.33%
181	Bolivia	11,253.54	10.11%	52.12%	21.97%
182	Jordan	11,230.28	15.96%	48.72%	17.50%
183	Tonga	11,181.49	16.12%	48.41%	16.03%
184	Lebanon	10,989.49	11.33%	49.47%	19.88%
185	South & Southeast Asia (MER)	10,597.72	12.64%	56.96%	23.69%
186	South & Southeast Asia (PPP)	10,597.67	13.62%	55.06%	21.38%
187	Morocco	10,399.04	15.49%	47.58%	13.26%
188	Angola	10,306.94	9.51%	57.71%	25.84%
189	Cabo Verde	10,231.71	13.26%	48.59%	13.77%
190	Samoa	9,995.64	16.12%	48.41%	16.03%
191	Bangladesh	9,943.06	19.05%	41.39%	15.77%
192	Lao PDR	9,815.99	14.24%	47.55%	19.40%
193	Cote d’Ivoire	9,809.22	16.65%	43.63%	11.95%
194	Jamaica	9,598.74	10.11%	52.12%	21.97%
195	Mauritania	9,571.10	18.38%	39.29%	9.80%
196	Ghana	9,316.08	12.84%	48.55%	15.12%
197	Uzbekistan	9,313.78	15.83%	44.88%	16.41%
198	India	9,287.30	15.02%	57.68%	22.60%
199	Kyrgyzstan	8,845.01	18.92%	42.20%	17.65%
200	Nicaragua	8,804.46	10.11%	52.12%	21.97%
201	Nigeria	8,701.78	17.32%	41.76%	12.11%
202	Other North America & Oceania (PPP)	8,351.67	9.69%	57.34%	25.65%
203	Other North America & Oceania (MER)	8,351.66	8.17%	64.91%	33.17%
204	Sao Tome and Principe	8,120.15	14.08%	50.00%	15.79%
205	Tajikistan	8,079.14	16.92%	41.51%	14.28%
206	Pakistan	8,074.64	19.41%	41.72%	16.23%
207	Djibouti	7,823.13	13.80%	49.15%	15.73%
208	Cambodia	7,782.29	14.19%	45.23%	18.08%
209	Kenya	7,686.92	15.46%	46.56%	13.60%
210	Honduras	7,485.22	10.11%	52.12%	21.97%
211	Cameroon	7,253.88	13.22%	47.14%	13.14%
212	Other Oceania (PPP)	7,183.01	11.13%	51.93%	20.92%
213	Other Oceania (MER)	7,183.00	10.28%	56.47%	23.14%
214	Congo (Republic)	6,973.17	10.48%	55.58%	20.39%
215	Palestine	6,824.46	10.95%	51.09%	16.11%
216	Zanzibar	6,252.25			
217	Kiribati	6,246.66	16.12%	48.41%	16.03%
218	Nepal	6,199.60	18.53%	40.56%	13.42%
219	Sub-Saharan Africa (MER)	6,168.16	10.77%	55.27%	22.12%
220	Sub-Saharan Africa (PPP)	6,168.11	10.56%	53.49%	19.86%
221	Timor-Leste	5,892.92	18.71%	40.24%	14.88%
222	Senegal	5,765.38	16.23%	45.07%	12.88%
223	Zambia	5,753.88	9.34%	55.90%	17.94%
224	Benin	5,687.48	17.05%	43.00%	12.64%
225	Myanmar	5,383.18	17.73%	42.04%	16.31%
226	Papua New Guinea	5,301.34	13.74%	45.84%	16.21%
227	Micronesia	5,281.95	16.12%	48.41%	16.03%
228	Other Sub-Saharan Africa (MER)	5,268.01	10.35%	55.41%	21.01%
229	Other Sub-Saharan Africa (PPP)	5,267.93	10.34%	54.99%	20.69%
230	Comoros	5,245.73	11.97%	49.93%	14.06%
231	Vanuatu	5,213.18	16.12%	48.41%	16.03%
232	Ethiopia	5,021.21	18.80%	39.76%	10.27%
233	Tanzania	4,880.63	14.09%	50.69%	17.91%
234	Uganda	4,718.86	13.15%	52.48%	21.18%
235	Syrian Arab Republic	4,712.64	11.77%	55.15%	21.37%
236	Rwanda	4,647.26	14.66%	51.46%	18.67%
237	Guinea	4,513.44	19.67%	37.23%	8.55%
238	Gambia	4,418.76	14.94%	47.41%	15.82%
239	Lesotho	4,285.37	11.96%	49.13%	14.34%
240	Sierra Leone	4,239.27	16.36%	46.24%	14.78%
241	Togo	4,192.01	15.40%	45.94%	13.89%
242	Zimbabwe	4,014.81	9.96%	58.48%	20.90%
243	Mali	3,980.42	16.41%	44.24%	11.93%
244	Burkina Faso	3,840.82	15.61%	46.86%	14.52%
245	Haiti	3,545.17	10.11%	52.12%	21.97%
246	Chad	3,464.99	15.74%	45.73%	12.63%
247	Afghanistan	3,399.89	19.92%	39.94%	14.69%
248	Solomon Islands	3,324.97	16.12%	48.41%	16.03%
249	Guinea-Bissau	3,205.14	17.46%	41.39%	10.85%
250	Niger	3,129.34	17.80%	44.38%	13.86%
251	Eritrea	2,979.66	18.80%	39.76%	10.27%
252	Venezuela	2,850.50	10.11%	52.12%	21.97%
253	South Sudan	2,613.11	12.55%	49.65%	15.41%
254	Liberia	2,591.92	16.64%	42.62%	12.02%
255	DR Congo	2,347.84	12.36%	53.48%	19.26%
256	Madagascar	2,329.83	15.96%	46.18%	13.79%
257	North Korea	2,296.03	15.12%	42.67%	14.76%
258	Malawi	2,281.88	15.07%	47.81%	15.02%
259	Somalia	2,249.43	15.22%	47.59%	15.31%
260	Central African Republic	2,078.77	12.98%	49.91%	15.44%
261	Mozambique	2,040.03	10.51%	58.95%	22.55%
262	Yemen	1,494.66	10.16%	59.09%	24.87%
263	Burundi	1,393.65	15.59%	46.44%	14.29%
264	Sudan	1,122.28	17.09%	44.33%	15.12%

== See also ==
- List of countries by GNI (real) per capita
- List of countries by GNI (nominal) per capita
- List of countries by GNI per capita growth
- List of sovereign states in Europe by GNI (PPP) per capita
- World Bank high−income economy
