= IRD =

IRD or Ird may refer to the following:

- ʿIrd, a part of the honor codes of the Bedouin for women
- Ird, alternate name of Arad, Iran, a city in Fars Province
- Ishwardi Airport (IATA airport code)
- Kaarel Ird (1909–1986), Estonian theatre leader, director and actor

As an initialism, IRD may refer to:

- Illinois Refining Division, a division of Marathon Petroleum located in Robinson, Illinois.
- Income in respect of a decedent
- Influenza Research Database, a publicly available database and analysis resource for influenza virus research
- Inland Revenue Department (disambiguation), in some countries
- Integrated receiver/decoder
- Research Institute for Development (French: Institut de recherche pour le développement), a scientific institution dedicated to the development of tropical countries
- Intelligent Resource Director, on IBM mainframes
- International Relief and Development Inc., a USAID grantee
- Internet radio device
- Institute on Religion and Democracy, a conservative Christian organization
- Information Research Department, a former department of the British Foreign Office
- "Image Replacement Document", another name for substitute check as defined in the Check Clearing for the 21st Century Act (Check 21)
- Interest rate derivative, a financial instrument
- Interest rate differential, weighs the contrast in interest rates between two similar interest-bearing assets
- Ice rafting debris
- International Road Dynamics
- Inherited Retina#Diseases and disorders
