= List of countries by GNI (nominal) per capita =

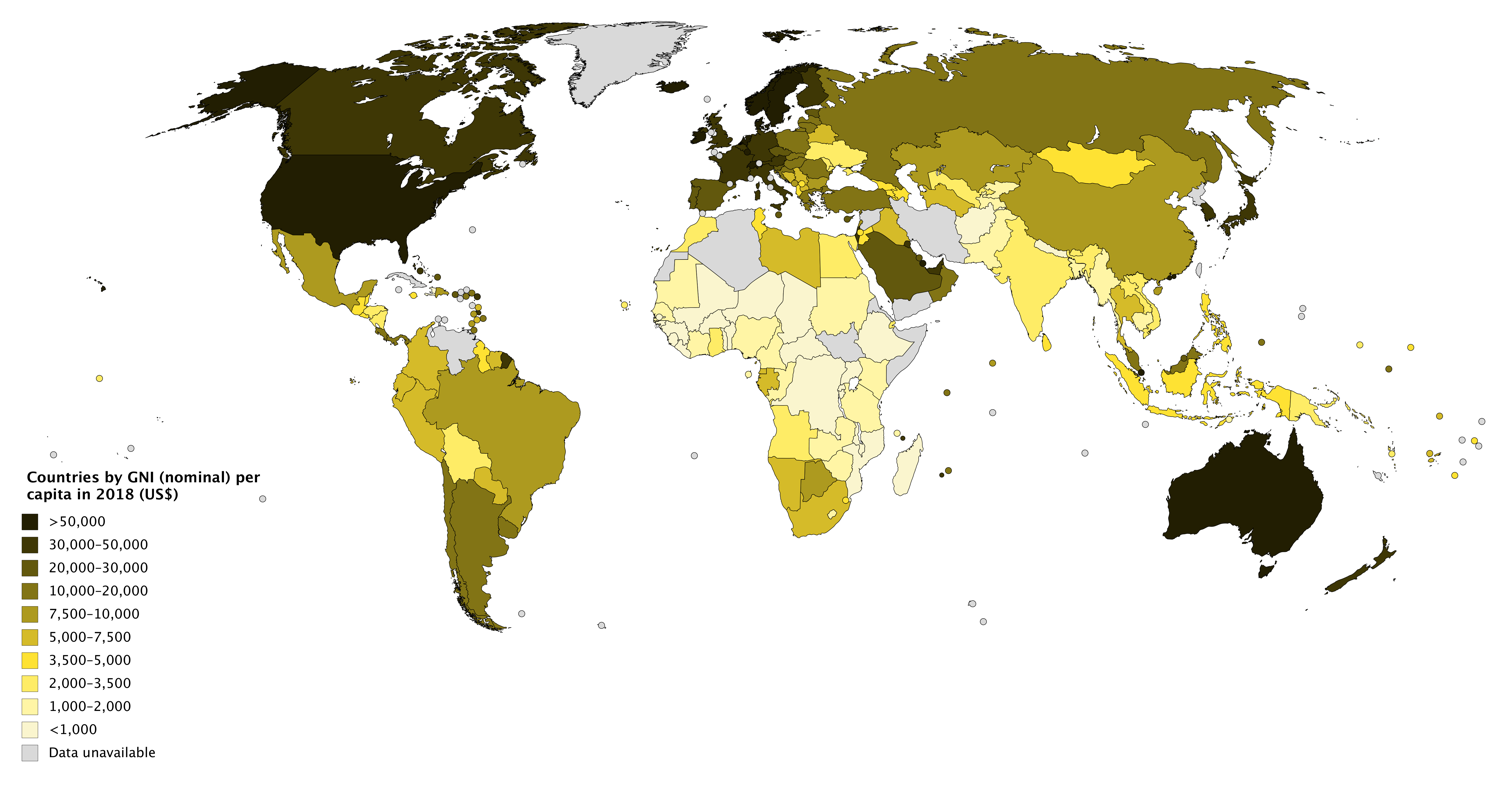
Countries by nominal GNI per capita according to the Atlas method (2018)

This is a list of countries by gross national income per capita in 2025 at nominal values, according to the Atlas method, an indicator of income developed by the World Bank. GNI per capita is the gross national income divided by the midyear population. GNI is the sum of value added by all resident producers plus any product taxes (less subsidies) not included in the valuation of output plus net receipts of primary income (compensation of employees and property income) from abroad.

Knowing a country's GNI per capita is a good first step toward understanding the country's economic strengths and needs, but does not take into account income distribution. A country's GNI per capita tends to be closely linked with other indicators that measure the social, economic, and environmental well-being of the country and its people. The GNI per capita at Purchasing power parity are shown at list of countries by GNI (PPP) per capita. Change of GNI per capita with time are at list of countries by GNI per capita growth. It also changes the gross national income and List of countries by GNI (real) per capita

== List of countries and dependencies ==
All data is in U.S. dollars. Rankings shown are those given by the World Bank. Non-sovereign entities or other special groupings are marked in italics.

† Although their GNI per capita exceeds the World Bank's 2025 high-income threshold (US$14,375), the World Bank continues to classify Turkey and Argentina as upper-middle-income economies due to the limitations of the Atlas method in classifying countries experiencing persistent high inflation.

	Country	GNI per capita (US$)	Year
	High Income Economies		2025
1	Liechtenstein	174971	2023
–	Bermuda (UK)	139,370	2024
2	Switzerland	110,330	2025
3	Norway	97,310	2025
4	Luxembourg	95,720	2025
5	Iceland	89,220	2025
6	United States	88,810	2025
7	Ireland	87,360	2025
–	Isle of Man (UK)	87,030	2023
–	Cayman Islands (UK)	81,920	2024
8	Singapore	81,760	2025
9	Denmark	77,190	2025
10	Qatar	74,330	2025
–	Faroe Islands (Denmark)	73,120	2024
–	Macau (China)	69,920	2024
11	Netherlands	68,530	2025
12	Australia	64,120	2025
13	Sweden	63,010	2025
–	Hong Kong (China)	62,500	2025
14	Austria	60,360	2025
15	Germany	60,200	2025
16	Belgium	59,500	2025
17	Canada	56,420	2025
18	Israel	56,180	2025
19	Finland	55,250	2025
20	United Kingdom	54,550	2025
21	San Marino	53,910	2023
22	Andorra	53,230	2025
23	United Arab Emirates	51,550	2024
24	France	48,630	2025
25	New Zealand	46,630	2025
26	Italy	42,080	2025
27	Malta	41,440	2025
28	Kuwait	41,110	2024
–	Taiwan	39,730	2025
–	Sint Maarten (Netherlands)	38,950	2024
29	Japan	38,340	2025
30	South Korea	37,880	2025
31	Spain	37,120	2025
32	Bahamas	37,020	2024
–	Turks and Caicos Islands (UK)	36,760	2024
33	Cyprus	36,110	2025
34	Saudi Arabia	36,070	2025
35	Slovenia	35,520	2025
–	Aruba (Netherlands)	35,200	2024
–	Greenland (Denmark)	34,800	2007
36	Brunei	34,790	2025
37	Czech Republic	32,960	2025
38	Estonia	32,310	2025
39	Lithuania	30,500	2025
–	New Caledonia (France)	30,070	2024
40	Portugal	29,930	2025
41	Bahrain	28,790	2025
42	Guyana	28,470	2025
–	Puerto Rico (US)	27,320	2025
43	Barbados	27,080	2025
44	Slovakia	26,410	2025
45	Poland	25,520	2025
46	Greece	25,360	2025
46	Croatia	25,360	2025
48	Latvia	24,980	2025
49	Saint Kitts and Nevis	24,530	2025
–	French Polynesia (France)	24,100	2024
50	Uruguay	24,020	2025
51	Hungary	23,850	2025
52	Antigua and Barbuda	23,790	2025
–	Curaçao (Netherlands)	22,570	2024
53	Nauru	20,690	2025
54	Romania	20,190	2025
55	Palau	19,890	2025
56	Oman	19,520	2024
57	Seychelles	19,200	2025
58	Panama	19,140	2025
59	Trinidad and Tobago	18,550	2025
60	Costa Rica	17,930	2025
61	Bulgaria	17,780	2025
62	Chile	16,960	2025
63	Turkey† (upper middle-income) (Note: Although Turkey and Argentina's GNI per capita exceeds the World Bank's 2025 high-income threshold, the World Bank continues to classify them as upper-middle-income economies due to the limitations of the Atlas method in classifying countries experiencing persistent high inflation.)	16,300	2025
64	Russia	15,960	2025
65	Argentina† (upper middle-income)	14,650	2025
	Upper Middle-Income Economies	14,375	2025
–	World	14,244	2025
66	China	14,230	2025
67	Montenegro	14,150	2025
68	Mauritius	14,040	2025
69	Kazakhstan	13,740	2025
70	Mexico	13,730	2025
71	Serbia	13,480	2025
72	Saint Lucia	13,410	2025
73	Maldives	12,950	2025
74	Malaysia	12,380	2025
75	Albania	12,060	2025
76	Saint Vincent and the Grenadines	12,000	2025
77	Grenada	11,660	2025
78	Dominica	10,690	2025
79	Dominican Republic	10,620	2025
80	Brazil	10,550	2025
81	Bosnia and Herzegovina	9,940	2025
82	Marshall Islands	9,710	2025
83	North Macedonia	9,490	2025
84	Belarus	9,160	2025
85	Armenia	9,020	2025
86	Cuba	9,010	2019
87	Georgia	8,990	2025
88	Tuvalu	8,770	2023
89	Peru	8,430	2025
90	Gabon	8,090	2025
91	Moldova	8,050	2025
92	Colombia	7,900	2025
93	Jamaica	7,790	2025
94	Kosovo	7,760	2025
95	Thailand	7,690	2025
96	Belize	7,530	2025
97	Botswana	7,390	2025
98	Azerbaijan	7,360	2025
99	Libya	7,250	2025
100	Ecuador	6,890	2025
101	Tonga	6,840	2025
102	Paraguay	6,750	2025
103	Guatemala	6,360	2025
104	Turkmenistan	6,340	2025
105	South Africa	6,270	2025
106	Fiji	6,230	2025
107	Mongolia	6,210	2025
108	Suriname	6,140	2025
109	Equatorial Guinea	5,890	2025
110	Algeria	5,850	2025
111	Iraq	5,690	2025
112	Samoa	5,640	2025
113	Cabo Verde	5,590	2025
114	Ukraine	5,510	2025
115	El Salvador	5,410	2025
116	Jordan	5,260	2025
117	Indonesia	5,120	2025
118	Vietnam	4,970	2025
119	Philippines	4,850	2025
120	Micronesia	4,760	2025
121	Sri Lanka	4,670	2025
122	Iran	4,650	2025
	Lower Middle-Income Economies	4,635	2025
123	Bolivia	4,420	2025
124	Vanuatu	4,410	2025
125	Morocco	4,360	2025
126	Namibia	4,340	2025
127	Bhutan	4,310	2025
128	Tunisia	4,300	2025
129	Djibouti	3,960	2025
130	Kiribati	3,930	2025
131	Venezuela	3,860	2025
132	Sao Tome and Principe	3,800	2025
133	Eswatini	3,730	2025
134	Uzbekistan	3,670	2025
135	Lebanon	3,560	2024
136	Honduras	3,270	2025
137	Egypt	3,260	2025
138	Palestine	3,250	2025
139	Papua New Guinea	2,890	2025
140	Angola	2,860	2025
141	Nicaragua	2,850	2025
142	Bangladesh	2,840	2025
143	Kyrgyzstan	2,800	2025
144	Ivory Coast	2,780	2025
145	India	2,760	2025
146	Cambodia	2,750	2025
147	Zimbabwe	2,660	2025
148	Ghana	2,630	2025
149	Republic of the Congo	2,280	2025
150	Mauritania	2,210	2025
151	Kenya	2,200	2025
152	Laos	2,150	2025
153	Tajikistan	2,080	2025
154	Solomon Islands	2,020	2025
155	Haiti	2,010	2025
156	Comoros	1,950	2025
157	Cameroon	1,860	2025
158	Senegal	1,780	2025
159	Guinea	1,730	2025
160	Benin	1,600	2025
161	Nepal	1,570	2025
162	Timor-Leste	1,510	2025
163	Pakistan	1,500	2025
164	Nigeria	1,360	2025
165	Togo	1,350	2025
166	Myanmar	1,320	2025
167	Lesotho	1,280	2025
168	Tanzania	1,270	2025
169	Zambia	1,200	2025
	Low Income Economies	1,175	2025
170	Rwanda	1,150	2025
171	Mali	1,120	2025
171	Uganda	1,120	2025
173	Ethiopia	1,110	2025
174	Guinea-Bissau	1,090	2025
175	Burkina Faso	980	2025
176	Chad	970	2025
177	Eritrea	960	2024
178	The Gambia	930	2025
179	Sudan	900	2025
180	Sierra Leone	830	2025
180	Syria	830	2024
180	Liberia	830	2025
183	Niger	750	2025
184	DR Congo	720	2025
185	North Korea	650	2024
186	Somalia	640	2025
187	Malawi	600	2025
188	Mozambique	570	2025
189	Central African Republic	560	2025
189	Madagascar	560	2025
191	Yemen	470	2024
192	Afghanistan	390	2024
193	South Sudan	350	2024
194	Burundi	240	2025

== No data ==
High-income group
American Samoa (US)
British Virgin Islands (UK)
Gibraltar (UK)
Guam (US)
Monaco
Northern Mariana Islands (US)
Saint Martin (France)
U.S. Virgin Islands (US)
Not Classified
Cook Islands (New Zealand)

== See also ==
- Gross national income
- List of countries by GNI (real) per capita
- List of sovereign states in Europe by GNI (nominal) per capita
- National average salary
- Median income
- High-income economy
- List of countries by wealth per adult
