= Sequence feature variant type =

Mutation of a given sequence feature in a protein

The Sequence Feature Variant Type (SFVT) refers to the defined sequence variation (mutation) of a given sequence feature in a protein. Consider a protein, its amino acid sequence determines its structure and function. Some regions of the sequence are primarily related to the protein folding, thus the structure, while other regions are related to the protein function, such as an enzyme catalytic site. Across many related species, regions in a corresponding protein would remain conserved from species to species, while the exact amino acid at each location might, and often does, change. To clearly illustrate both the conserved nature of the functional regions and the precise change in the actual amino acid, the Sequence Feature Variant Type is defined.

== Sequence Feature ==
A sequence feature is basically a collection of amino acids within a protein, where the collection may be a continuous range or some discrete residues. Most sequence features are from experimental results, but there are some that are from computational analysis.

== Sequence Feature Variant Type ==
For each sequence feature, the variations exist between many proteins from different related species. The variant types define the exact amino acid at each location for a feature. The larger the mutation at each location for a feature, the larger its number of variant types. For a given protein, once its amino acid sequence is determined, its sequence feature variant type is determined.

== Application ==
SFVTs can be used to study the protein functions across many related species. Such studies have been carried out on several human pathogens.

SFVTs are also available on Influenza Research Database for flu proteins and on Virus Pathogen Database and Analysis Resource for Dengue virus.
