= Influenza Research Database =

Public research database

- Influenza Research Database

Coverage
- Disciplines: Public database and tools

Links
- Website: www.fludb.org

The Influenza Research Database (IRD) is an integrative and comprehensive publicly available database and analysis resource to search, analyze, visualize, save and share data for influenza virus research. IRD is one of the five Bioinformatics Resource Centers (BRC) funded by the National Institute of Allergy and Infectious Diseases (NIAID), a component of the National Institutes of Health (NIH), which is an agency of the United States Department of Health and Human Services.

== Data types in IRD ==
- Segment, protein, and strain data
- Animal surveillance data
- Human clinical data
- Experimentally determined and predicted immune epitopes
- Sequence Features
- Predicted protein domains and motifs
- Gene Ontology annotations
- Computed sequence conservation score
- Clade classification for highly-pathogenic avian influenza H5N1 HA sequences
- 3D protein structures
- PCR primer data curated from literature
- Experiment data from laboratory experiments and clinical trials
- Phenotypic characteristic data curated from literature
- Serology data
- Host factor data

== Analysis and visualization tools in IRD ==
- BLAST: provides custom IRD databases to identify the most related sequence(s)
- Short Peptide Search: allows users to find peptide sequences in target proteins
- Identify Point Mutations: identifies influenza proteins having particular amino acids at user-specified positions
- Multiple sequence alignment: allows users to align segment/protein sequences using MUSCLE
- Sequence Alignment Visualization: uses JalView for sequence alignment visualization
- Phylogenetic tree construction: calculates a tree using various algorithms and evolutionary models
- Phylogenetic Tree Visualization: allows the color-coded display of strain metadata on a tree generated with one of several available algorithms and/or evolutionary models and viewed with Archaeopteryx
- 3D Protein Structure Visualization: integrates PDB protein structure files with sequence conservation score and IRD Sequence Features and provides an interactive 3D protein structure viewer using Jmol
- Sequence Feature Variant Type (SFVT) analysis: provides a centralized repository of functional regions and automatically calculates all observed sequence variation within each defined region
- Metadata-driven Comparative Analysis Tool for Sequences (Meta-CATS): an automated comparative statistical analysis to identify positions that significantly differ between user-defined sequence groups
- Sequence Variation Analysis (SNP): pre-computed sequence variation analysis in all IRD sequences; also allows users to calculate the extent of sequence variation in user-specified sequences
- PCR Primers/Probes: provides a repository of commonly used primers for influenza virus identification, and calculates the polymorphisms of all related IRD sequences at the primer positions
- PCR Primer Design: allows PCR primer design for IRD and user-provided sequences
- Sequence annotation: determines the user-provided nucleotide sequence's influenza type, segment number and subtype (for segments 4 and 6), and translates the nucleotide sequence
- HPAI H5N1 Clade Classification: predicts the clade of highly pathogenic H5 HA sequences
- ReadSeq: converts between various sequence formats
- Data Submission Tool: allows users to submit influenza sequences, Sequence Features, and experimental data online
- External Analysis Tools: displays a list and description of third-party tools for more specialized analyses
- Personal Workbench to save and share data and analysis
