= List of countries by GNI per capita growth =

Annual real GNI per capita growth in % last reported as of 2024: below -4 -4 to -3.1 -3 to -2.1 -2 to -1.1 -1 to -0.1 / 0 to 0.9 1 to 1.9 2 to 3.9 4 to 5.9 above 5.9 no data

This is a list of countries by gross national income (GNI) per capita growth. This list is not to be confused with GDP per capita growth, GNI per capita or per capita income growth.

The rate of annual GNI per capita growth according to the World Bank for the most recent available year is shown in the table below. These values of GNI per capita growth are corrected for inflation, but not adjusted for purchasing power parity.

The growth of GNI can show high variance between years for some countries. Some countries might misreport their GNI per capita growth, which can be corrected in later revisions.

== List ==
GNI per capita growth (annual %)
Country	Growth	Year
Afghanistan	3.6	2023
Albania	7.0	2024
Algeria	−0.6	2024
Angola	3.4	2024
Argentina	−4.1	2024
Armenia	0.5	2024
Australia	−1.4	2024
Austria	−1.5	2024
Azerbaijan	−5.2	2012
Bahamas	3.2	2024
Bahrain	0.5	2024
Bangladesh	3.3	2024
Belarus	5.0	2024
Belgium	0.6	2024
Belize	2.5	2024
Benin	5.1	2024
Bermuda	7.1	2024
Bhutan	3.9	2023
Bolivia	−1.0	2024
Bosnia and Herzegovina	5.0	2024
Botswana	−1.4	2023
Brazil	2.2	2024
Brunei Darussalam	1.4	2024
Bulgaria	3.0	2024
Burkina Faso	−5.1	2022
Burundi	−0.2	2023
Cabo Verde	9.3	2024
Cambodia	2.2	2024
Cameroon	2.2	2024
Canada	−1.4	2024
Central African Republic	−1.7	2024
Chad	−1.5	2024
Chile	3.0	2024
China	3.1	2022
Colombia	1.4	2024
Comoros	1.4	2024
DR Congo	18.9	2024
Republic of the Congo	−2.5	2024
Costa Rica	3.8	2024
Ivory Coast	2.6	2024
Croatia	5.7	2024
Cuba	0.1	2019
Cyprus	2.4	2024
Czech Republic	2.1	2024
Denmark	2.0	2024
Djibouti	11.2	2024
Dominican Republic	3.0	2024
Ecuador	−0.1	2024
Egypt	−1.1	2024
El Salvador	1.5	2024
Equatorial Guinea	−3.6	2024
Estonia	0.5	2023
Eswatini	−1.0	2024
Ethiopia	8.4	2024
Finland	−0.9	2024
France	0.6	2024
Gabon	2.5	2024
The Gambia	7.2	2024
Georgia	13.2	2024
Germany	−0.1	2024
Ghana	8.8	2024
Greece	2.9	2024
Guatemala	4.0	2024
Guinea	5.1	2024
Guinea-Bissau	5.1	2024
Haiti	−3.7	2024
Honduras	1.0	2024
Hong Kong	5.0	2024
Hungary	−0.3	2024
India	5.5	2024
Indonesia	4.0	2024
Iran	−0.6	2024
Iraq	−5.4	2024
Ireland	2.7	2024
Isle of Man	−2.6	2022
Israel	0.5	2024
Italy	1.5	2024
Jamaica	1.9	2019
Japan	3.0	2023
Kazakhstan	5.3	2024
Kenya	3.1	2024
South Korea	3.9	2024
Kosovo	11.6	2024
Kuwait	−12.6	2023
Kyrgyzstan	13.1	2024
Laos	11.9	2016
Latvia	1.9	2024
Lebanon	4.1	2023
Lesotho	0.2	2023
Libya	9.7	2024
Lithuania	4.5	2024
Luxembourg	−3.3	2024
Macau	50.5	2023
Madagascar	0.0	2024
Malawi	−0.2	2023
Malaysia	3.4	2024
Maldives	11.0	2024
Mali	2.6	2024
Malta	3.7	2024
Marshall Islands	7.2	2024
Mauritania	5.0	2024
Mauritius	4.5	2024
Mexico	0.4	2024
Moldova	5.9	2024
Mongolia	2.7	2024
Montenegro	2.1	2024
Morocco	5.0	2024
Mozambique	−3.7	2024
Namibia	4.1	2024
Nepal	4.2	2024
Netherlands	0.9	2024
New Zealand	−2.4	2023
Nicaragua	5.8	2024
Niger	8.6	2024
North Macedonia	4.0	2024
Norway	24.9	2022
Oman	−3.5	2024
Pakistan	2.4	2024
Palau	0.7	2023
Panama	1.4	2024
Papua New Guinea	0.4	2004
Paraguay	1.4	2024
Peru	4.8	2024
Philippines	6.8	2024
Poland	3.7	2024
Portugal	3.2	2024
Puerto Rico	4.2	2023
Qatar	−17.9	2020
Romania	3.7	2024
Russia	4.7	2023
Rwanda	11.6	2024
Samoa	7.7	2024
San Marino	0.0	2023
Saudi Arabia	−4.8	2024
Senegal	7.5	2024
Serbia	4.9	2024
Seychelles	5.5	2023
Sierra Leone	−2.6	2024
Singapore	4.1	2024
Slovakia	2.9	2024
Slovenia	2.3	2024
Solomon Islands	2.7	2024
Somalia	1.9	2024
South Africa	−1.4	2024
South Sudan	−15.3	2015
Spain	2.8	2024
Sri Lanka	7.8	2024
Sudan	−18.5	2024
Sweden	0.7	2024
Switzerland	−2.3	2023
Tajikistan	−9.8	2023
Tanzania	3.3	2024
East Timor	−9.7	2024
Togo	4.3	2022
Tonga	3.5	2023
Tunisia	5.0	2024
Uganda	−0.1	2024
Ukraine	2.6	2024
United Arab Emirates	3.7	2023
United Kingdom	1.9	2024
United States	0.9	2023
Uruguay	2.7	2024
Vanuatu	−4.6	2022
Venezuela	4.2	2024
Vietnam	7.2	2024
Palestine	-35.0	2024
Zimbabwe	0.3	2024

== See also ==
- National average salary
- Disposable household and per capita income
- Median income
- Net national income
- Income distribution
- List of countries by income equality
