= High-income economy =

Income classification for countries

Map of world economies based on the World Bank income classification for the 2027 fiscal year

World bank income groups

A high-income economy is defined as a country or territory with a gross national income (GNI) per capita, calculated using the World Bank's Atlas method, exceeding the annual threshold, which for the fiscal year 2027 (based on 2025 data) is $14,375. As of the 2026 classification, approximately 87 economies fall into this category, including major industrialized nations such as the United States, Germany, and Japan, alongside smaller entities such as Andorra, Bahrain, and certain Caribbean islands reliant on tourism or resource exports.

Several institutions, such as the Central Intelligence Agency (CIA) or International Monetary Fund (IMF), take factors other than high per capita income into account when classifying countries as "developed" or "advanced economies". According to the United Nations, for example, some high-income countries may also be developing countries. The GCC countries, for example, are classified as developing high-income countries. Thus, a high-income country may be classified as either developed or developing. Although Vatican City is a sovereign state, it is not classified by the World Bank under this definition.

== List of high-income economies (for 2027 fiscal year) ==
According to the World Bank the following 87 countries (including territories) are classified as "high-income economies". In brackets are the year(s) during which they held such classification; classifying began in 1987. As of the 2027 fiscal year, high-income economies are those that had a GNI per capita of $14,375 or more in 2025.

=== High income UN members ===
- Andorra (1990–present)
- Antigua and Barbuda (2002, 2005–08, 2012–present)
- Australia (1987–present)
- Austria (1987–present)
- The Bahamas (1987–present)
- Bahrain (1987–89, 2001–present)
- Barbados (1989, 2000, 2002, 2006–present)
- Belgium (1987–present)
- Brunei (1987, 1990–present)
- Bulgaria (2023–present)
- Canada (1987–present)
- Chile (2012–present)
- Costa Rica (2024–present)
- Croatia (2008–15, 2017–present)
- Cyprus (1988–present)
- Czech Republic (2006–present)
- Denmark (1987–present)
- Estonia (2006–present)
- Finland (1987–present)
- France (1987–present)
- Germany (1987–present)
- Greece (1996–present)
- Guyana (2022–present)
- Hungary (2007–11, 2014–present)
- Iceland (1987–present)
- Ireland (1987–present)
- Israel (1987–present)
- Italy (1987–present)
- Japan (1987–present)
- Kuwait (1987–present)
- Latvia (2009, 2012–present)
- Liechtenstein (1994–present)
- Lithuania (2012–present)
- Luxembourg (1987–present)
- Malta (1989, 1998, 2000, 2002–present)
- Monaco (1994–present)
- Nauru (2015, 2019–present)
- Netherlands (1987–present)
- New Zealand (1987–present)
- Norway (1987–present)
- Oman (2007–present)
- Palau (2016–20, 2023–present)
- Panama (2017–19, 2021–present)
- Poland (2009–present)
- Portugal (1994–present)
- Qatar (1987–present)
- Romania (2019, 2021–present)
- Russia (2012–14, 2023–present)
- Saint Kitts and Nevis (2011–present)
- San Marino (1991–93, 2000–present)
- Saudi Arabia (1987–89, 2004–present)
- Seychelles (2014–present)
- Singapore (1987–present)
- Slovakia (2007–present)
- Slovenia (1997–present)
- South Korea (1995–97, 2001–present)
- Spain (1987–present)
- Sweden (1987–present)
- Switzerland (1987–present)
- Trinidad and Tobago (2006–present)
- United Arab Emirates (1987–present)
- United Kingdom (1987–present)
- United States (1987–present)
- Uruguay (2012–present)

=== High income non-UN members ===
- American Samoa (1987–89, 2022–present)
- Aruba (1987–90, 1994–present)
- Bermuda (1987–present)
- British Virgin Islands (2015–present)
- Cayman Islands (1993–present)
- (Guernsey) / (Jersey) Channel Islands (1987–present)
- Curaçao (1994–present)^{a}
- Faroe Islands (1987–present)
- French Polynesia (1990–present)
- Gibraltar (2009–10, 2015–present)
- Greenland (1987–present)
- Guam (1987–89, 1995–present)
- Hong Kong (1987–present)
- Isle of Man (1987–89, 2002–present)
- Macau (1994–present)
- New Caledonia (1995–present)
- Northern Mariana Islands (1995–2001, 2007–present)
- Puerto Rico (1989, 2002–present)
- Saint Martin (2010–present)
- Sint Maarten (1994–present)^{a}
- Taiwan (1987–present)
- Turks and Caicos Islands (2009–present)
- U.S. Virgin Islands (1987–present)

=== Former high-income economies ===
The year(s) during which they held such classification is/are shown in parentheses.

- Argentina (2014, 2017)
- Equatorial Guinea (2007–14)
- Mauritius (2019)
- Mayotte (1990)
- Netherlands Antilles (1994–2009)^{b}
- Venezuela (2014)

^{a} Between 1994 and 2009, as a part of the Netherlands Antilles. ^{b} Dissolved on 10 October 2010. Succeeded by Curaçao and Sint Maarten.

== Historical thresholds ==
The high-income threshold was originally set in 1989 at US$6,000 in 1987 prices. Thresholds for subsequent years were adjusted taking into account the average inflation in the G-5 countries (the United States, the United Kingdom, Japan, Germany, and France), and from 2001, that of Japan, the United Kingdom, the United States, and the eurozone. Thus, the thresholds remain constant in real terms over time. To ensure no country falls right on the threshold, country data are rounded to the nearest 10 and income thresholds are rounded to the nearest 5.

The following table shows the high-income threshold from 1987 onwards. Countries with a GNI per capita (calculated using the Atlas method) above this threshold are classified by the World Bank as "high-income economies".

Year	GNI per capita (US$)	Date of classification
1987	6,000	October 2, 1988
1988	6,000	September 13, 1989
1989	6,000	August 29, 1990
1990	7,620	September 11, 1991
1991	7,910	August 24, 1992
1992	8,355	September 9, 1993
1993	8,625	September 2, 1994
1994	8,955	June 8, 1995
1995	9,385	June 3, 1996
1996	9,645	July 1, 1997
1997	9,655	July 1, 1998
1998	9,360	July 1, 1999
1999	9,265	July 1, 2000
2000	9,265	July 1, 2001
2001	9,205	July 1, 2002
2002	9,075	July 1, 2003
2003	9,385	July 1, 2004
2004	10,065	July 1, 2005
2005	10,725	July 1, 2006
2006	11,115	July 1, 2007
2007	11,455	July 1, 2008
2008	11,905	July 1, 2009
2009	12,195	July 1, 2010
2010	12,275	July 1, 2011
2011	12,475	July 1, 2012
2012	12,615	July 1, 2013
2013	12,745	July 1, 2014
2014	12,735	July 1, 2015
2015	12,475	July 1, 2016
2016	12,236	July 1, 2017
2017	12,056	July 1, 2018
2018	12,376	July 1, 2019
2019	12,536	July 1, 2020
2020	12,696	July 1, 2021
2021	13,205	July 1, 2022
2022	13,845	July 1, 2023
2023	14,005	July 1, 2024
2024	13,935	July 1, 2025
2025	14,375	July 1, 2026

== See also ==
- Developed country
- Developing country
- Least developed countries
- Median income
- Global North and Global South
