= Bioinformatics Resource Centers =

Research centers

The Bioinformatics Resource Centers (BRCs) are a group of five Internet-based research centers established in 2004 and funded by NIAID (the National Institute of Allergy and Infectious Diseases.) The BRCs were formed in response to the threats posed by emerging and re-emerging pathogens, particularly Centers for Disease Control and Prevention (CDC) Category A, B, and C pathogens, and their potential use in bioterrorism. The intention of NIAID in funding these bioinformatics centers is to assist researchers involved in the experimental characterization of such pathogens and the formation of drugs, vaccines, or diagnostic tools to combat them.

The main goals of the BRCs are as follows:

1) To create comprehensive databases of reliable, up-to-date bioinformatic data (genetic, proteomic, biochemical, or microbiological) related to the pathogens of interest;
2) To provide researchers with easy access to this data through Internet-based search and data retrieval user interfaces;
3) To provide researchers with relevant, state-of-the art computational tools for bioinformatic analysis of these data.

Currently there are two BRC contracts awarded, one for bacteria and viruses, and the other for vectors, Eukaryotic protozoan and fungal pathogens and host response to pathogen infections.

Bioinformatics Resource Centers
| Name | Acrono name | Contributing organization(s) | Organisms covered | Example organisms (CDC Category) |
|---|---|---|---|---|
| Eukaryotic Pathogen, Vector and Host Informatics Resources | VEuPathDB | University of Pennsylvania University of Notre Dame; University of Georgia; Imperial College of London; EBI-ENSEMBL | All relevant pathogenic protozoa, fungi, vectors of pathogens and selected host organisms. In addition, important non-pathogenic organisms are included for phylogenetic inferences. | Crithidia (Other) Cryptosporidium (B); Encephalitozoon (Group I); Entamoeba (B); Enterocytozoon (Group I); Giardia (B); Leishmania (Other); Neospora (Other); Plasmodium (Other); Theileria (Other); Toxoplasma (B); Trichomonas (Other); Trypanosoma (Other) Anopheles gambiae (Other); Anopheles species (x16) (Other); Aedes aegypti (Other); Biomphalaria glabrata (Other); Culex quinquefasciatus (Other); Glossina species (x5) (Other); Ixodes scapularis (Other); Lutzomyia longipalpis (Other); Musca domestica (Other); Pediculus humanus (Other); Phlebotomus papatasi (Other) |
| Bacterial and Viral Bioinformatics Resource Center | BV-BRC | J. Craig Venter Institute University of Chicago | All pathogenic bacteria and viruses | Influenza Virus (flu) (C) Arenaviridae (A); Bunyaviridae (A); Filoviridae (A); Flaviviridae (A); Poxviridae (A); Caliciviridae (B); Togaviridae (B); Hepatitis A virus (B); Coronaviridae (C); Paramyxoviridae (C); Lyssavirus (C); Hepatitis E Herpesviridae; Reoviridae Bacillus (A); Bartonella (Group I); Borrelia (Group I); Brucella (B); Burkholderia (B); Campylobacter (B); Chlamydophila (B); Clostridium (A); Coxiella (B); Ehrlichia (Group I); Escherichia (B); Francisella (A); Helicobacter (Group I); Listeria (B); Mycobacterium (C); Rickettsia (B, C); Salmonella (B); Shigella (B); Staphylococcus (B); Vibrio (B); Yersinia (A, B); Other Bacteria |

== See also ==
- National Institutes of Health
- National Institute of Allergy and Infectious Diseases
- Bioinformatics
- Categories of biological agents
