= Income in respect of a decedent =

Type of taxable income

As defined by Title 26 of the United States Code of Federal Regulations § 1.642(c)-5 and the Internal Revenue Code section 691, the income in respect of a decedent (IRD) is "all income the decedent would have received had death not occurred that wasn't properly includible on the final tax return". It is payable to decedent’s estate, trusts, or individual beneficiaries after decedent's death. These are includible in the decedent’s estate for federal estate tax purposes and is often a reason of misunderstanding or oversight.

Common IRD assets are IRA bequests.
