= Net national income =

Measure of economic activity

In national income accounting, net national income (NNI) is Gross national income (GNI) minus depreciation. Net national income encompasses the income of households, businesses, and the government. Net national income is defined as gross domestic product plus net receipts of wages, salaries and property income from abroad, minus the depreciation of fixed capital assets (dwellings, buildings, machinery, transport equipment and physical infrastructure) through wear and tear and obsolescence.

It can be expressed as

$$\mathrm{NNI} = \mathrm{C} + \mathrm{I} + \mathrm{G} + \mathrm{NX} + \left[{\text{Net Foreign} \atop \text{Factor Income}}\right] - \left[{\text{Indirect} \atop \text{Taxes}}\right] - \left[{\text{Manufactured Capital} \atop \text{Depreciation}}\right]$$

where C denotes consumption, I denotes investment, G denotes government spending, and NX represents net exports (exports minus imports: X – M).

This formula uses the expenditure method of national income accounting.

When net national income is adjusted for natural resource depletion, it is called Adjusted Net National Income, expressed as

$$\mathrm{NNI}^* = \mathrm{NNI} - \left[{\text{Natural Resource} \atop \text{Depletion}}\right]$$

Natural resources are non-critical natural capital such as minerals. NNI* does not take critical natural capital into account. Examples are air, water, land, etc.

For reference, capital (K) is divided into four categories:

- $K_m$ : manufactured capital (machines, factories, etc.)
- $K_h$ : human capital (workers' skills)
- $K_n$ : non-critical natural capital (minerals)
- $K_h*$ : critical natural capital (air, water)

== See also ==
- National Income Accounting
- Gross domestic income
- Gross domestic product
