= National average salary =

Labor statistic

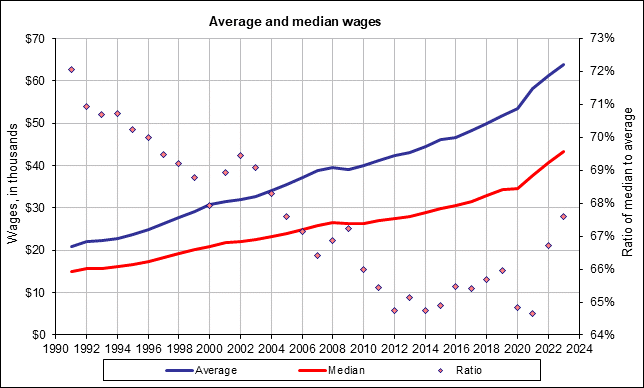
National average and median salary in the United States from 1990 to 2024 in thousands of dollars

The national average salary (or national average wage) is the mean salary for the working population of a nation. It is calculated by summing all the annual salaries of all persons in work (surveyed) and dividing the total by the number of workers (surveyed). It is not the same as the Gross domestic product (GDP) per capita, which is calculated by dividing the GDP by the total population of a country, including the unemployed and those not in the workforce (e.g. retired people, children, students, etc.). It can be useful in understanding economic conditions, and to employers and employees in negotiating salaries. The national median salary is usually significantly less than the national average salary because the distribution of workers by salary is skewed.

== Examples of usage ==
- The United States Social Security Administration calculates a "national average wage index", used to index past wages of workers by multiplying them by the ratio of the current wage index to the wage index at the time the wages were earned, for the purposes of benefit calculations. The wage index is updated every year by multiplying it by the percentage the US national average wage has changed that year.

== Statistics ==
- List of countries by average wage
- List of countries in Europe by average wage

== See also ==
- Median income
