= Real income =

Income adjusted for inflation

Real income is the income of individuals or nations after adjusting for inflation. It is calculated by dividing nominal income by the price level. Real variables such as real income and real GDP are variables that are measured in physical units, while nominal variables such as nominal income and nominal GDP are measured in monetary units. Therefore, real income is a more useful indicator of well-being since it measures the amount of goods and services that can be purchased with the income. Growth of real income is related to real gross national income per capita growth.

According to the classical dichotomy theory, real variables and nominal variables are separate in the long run, so they are not influenced by each other. In other words, if the nominal starting income was 100 and there was 10% inflation (general rise in prices, for example, what cost 10 now costs 11), then with nominal income of still 100, one can buy roughly 9% less; so if nominal income was not adjusted for inflation (did not rise by 10%), real income has dropped by approximately 9%. But if the classical dichotomy holds, nominal income will eventually go up by 10%, leaving real income unchanged from its original value.

== Real gross national income per capita by country ==
The real gross national income (GNI) per capita in constant 2015 USD according to the World Bank is shown for last available year:

Country	GNI per capita (constant 2015 USD)	Year
Liechtenstein	137,688.9	2015
Bermuda	119,539.7	2024
Norway	104,870.8	2025
Switzerland	85,646.1	2024
Isle of Man	81,295.1	2015
Luxembourg	70,610.5	2025
United States	67,190.8	2025
Ireland	67,924.4	2025
Singapore	64,996.3	2025
Macau	64,641.6	2024
Denmark	62,544.0	2015
Australia	62,326.9	2024
Iceland	58,380.9	2024
Sweden	56,459.3	2015
Faroe Islands	54,063.0	2015
Hong Kong	51,697.3	2025
Qatar	51,506.8	2024
Netherlands	51,094.3	2024
United Arab Emirates	50,109.6	2025
United Kingdom	47,436.2	2024
Germany	45,964.4	2024
Canada	45,752.5	2025
Cayman Islands	45,310.1	2024
Finland	45,195.5	2024
Belgium	44,601.5	2025
Austria	44,384.8	2025
Israel	42,710.5	2025
New Zealand	41,481.0	2025
France	39,871.0	2024
Japan	39,758.4	2025
South Korea	37,860.0	2025
Saint Martin	36,729.6	2025
Italy	34,912.0	2025
Kuwait	34,174.4	2024
New Caledonia	32,605.3	2015
Malta	32,16.6	2025
The Bahamas	31,544.6	2024
Brunei	31,132.9	2025
Cyprus	29,271.5	2025
Spain	29,932.5	2024
Turks and Caicos Islands	27,735.9	2025
Bahrain	26,622.3	2024
Saudi Arabia	26,411.5	2025
Aruba	26,301.9	2015
Slovenia	25,828.6	2024
Portugal	23,290.3	2025
Greece	21,337.3	2024
French Polynesia	21,131.3	2015
Estonia	19,965.4	2024
Denmark	62,544.0	2025
Estonia	3,761.3	2025
Czech Republic	19,821.4	2024
Trinidad and Tobago	19,709.7	2015
Puerto Rico	19,688.5	2015
Barbados	19,666.2	2015
Uruguay	19,156.2	2025
Curacao	19,082.1	2015
Lithuania	18,159.2	2024
Slovakia	17,968.0	2024
Oman	17,900.1	2024
Poland	17,890.6	2025
Latvia	16,917.0	2024
Seychelles	16,471.2	2023
Panama	16,231.9	2024
Hungary	15,881.0	2024
Chile	15,550.1	2025
Antigua and Barbuda	15,132.1	2015
Costa Rica	14,132.0	2025
Romania	14,071.7	2025
Palau	13,634.2	2024
Argentina	13,362.2	2025
Kazakhstan	12,014.5	2024
Malaysia	12,014.0	2025
Mauritius	11,463.3	2025
Turkey	10,940.9	2015
Bulgaria	10,881.5	2025
Nauru	10,641.1	2015
Mexico	10,450.3	2025
Montenegro	10,000.4	2025
Russia	9,995.9	2023
Brazil	9,491.1	2025
Saint Lucia	9,476.2	2015
Gabon	8,890.7	2025
Dominican Republic	8,835.5	2025
Suriname	8,790.6	2015
Serbia	8,721.4	2025
Cuba	8,184.4	2019
China	8,137.1	2015
Dominica	7,968.8	2015
Maldives	7,906.9	2024
Grenada	7,679.1	2015
Libya	7,454.7	2025
Belarus	7,314.8	2025
Peru	7,241.6	2024
Colombia	7,202.2	2025
Marshall Islands	7,184.5	2024
Saint Vincent and the Grenadines	7,169.7	2015
Bosnia and Herzegovina	7,117.1	2025
Paraguay	6,889.2	2025
North Macedonia	6,863.5	2025
Albania	6,816.7	2024
Georgia	6,755.0	2025
Botswana	6,662.5	2024
Ecuador	6,242.2	2025
Mongolia	6,164.4	2025
Belize	6,018.1	2024
Kosovo	5,855.6	2025
South Africa	5,784.6	2025
Equatorial Guinea	5,686.4	2025
Guyana	5,673.0	2015
Armenia	5,533.4	2025
Iraq	5,473.4	2024
Tonga	5,427.9	2024
Turkmenistan	5,422.6	2015
Thailand	5,395.4	2015
Samoa	5,370.3	2025
Azerbaijan	5,324.6	2015
Tuvalu	5,192.5	2015
Jamaica	5,182.3	2015
Iran	5,001.9	2024
Algeria	5,000.8	2025
Cabo Verde	4,855.6	2025
Guatemala	4,819.4	2025
Fiji	4,788.0	2015
Lebanon	4,702.1	2024
Philippines	4,647.7	2025
Namibia	4,420.0	2025
Moldova	4,404.8	2025
Jordan	4,396.2	2015
Indonesia	4,381.6	2025
Sri Lanka	4,297.9	2025
El Salvador	4,277.9	2025
Vietnam	4,205.7	2025
Tunisia	4,087.6	2025
Egypt	3,840.6	2025
Morocco	3,764.8	2025
Djibouti	3,761.2	2025
Micronesia	3,419.2	2015
Kiribati	3,386.2	2024
Bhutan	3,350.0	2024
Vanuatu	3,258.9	2024
Uzbekistan	3,219.3	2015
Angola	3,189.6	2024
Eswatini	3,161.7	2024
Bolivia	3,038.0	2024
Ukraine	2,916.2	2025
Nigeria	2,519.1	2015
India	2,488.1	2020
Nicaragua	2,488.1	2025
Ivory Coast	2,470.7	2025
Honduras	2,423.4	2025
Papua New Guinea	2,322.3	2015
Cambodia	2,299.0	2025
Laos	2,267.1	2016
Ghana	2,175.8	2024
Mauritania	2,094.2	2025
Kyrgyzstan	2,069.1	2025
Kenya	1,904.8	2025
Solomon Islands	1,895.9	2024
Pakistan	1,753.3	2025
Sao Tome and Principe	1,745.0	2025
Senegal	1,576.3	2025
Tajikistan	1,527.7	2024
Cameroon	1,482.3	2025
Comoros	1,468.0	2025
Benin	1,376.2	2025
Congo Republic	1,375.4	2025
Zimbabwe	1,371.8	2024
Nepal	1,306.6	2025
Bangladesh	1,303.9	2015
East Timor	1,286.8	2024
Zambia	1,270.4	2015
Haiti	1,267.7	2025
Sudan	1,263.3	2015
Lesotho	1,249.9	2023
Tanzania	1,177.8	2025
Venezuela	1,137.6	2025
Myanmar	1,125.5	2015
Sierra Leone	1,124.7	2025
Guinea	1,121.1	2025
Togo	1,010.6	2023
Rwanda	1,08.7	2025
Yemen	991.4	2018
Mali	979.5	2025
Ethiopia	972.4	2025
Uganda	948.0	2025
South Sudan	947.4	2015
Burkina Faso	885.5	2025
Chad	855.8	2025
Guinea Bissau	818.0	2025
Syria	815.8	2015
The Gambia	727.8	2025
Liberia	632.5	2015
Niger	609.5	2025
Afghanistan	569.0	2015
Mozambique	551.0	2025
Malawi	526.7	2015
Central African Republic	498.7	2025
Somalia	480.7	2025
Democratic Republic of Congo	473.0	2025
Madagascar	453.4	2025
Burundi	254.4	2015
