= Korean nationalist historiography =

Pro-Korean view of history

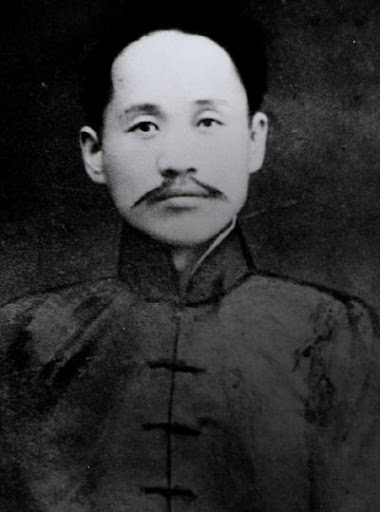
Shin Chaeho (1880–1936), the earliest proponent of Korea's nationalist historiography

Korean nationalist historiography (Korean: 민족사학; Hanja: 民族史學) is a way of writing Korean history that centers on the Korean minjok, an ethnically defined Korean nation. This form of Nationalist historiography arose in the early twentieth century among Korean intellectuals aiming to foster national consciousness to achieve Korean independence from Japanese domination. Its first proponent was journalist and independence activist Shin Chaeho (1880–1936). In his polemical New Reading of History (Doksa Sillon), which was published in 1908 three years after Korea became a Japanese protectorate, Shin proclaimed that Korean history was the history of the Korean minjok, a distinct race descended from the god Dangun that had once controlled not only the Korean peninsula but also large parts of Manchuria. Nationalist historians made expansive claims to the territory of these ancient Korean kingdoms, by which the present state of the minjok was to be judged.

Shin and other Korean intellectuals like Park Eun-sik (1859–1925) and Choe Nam-seon (1890–1957) continued to develop these themes in the 1910s and 1920s. They rejected two prior ways of representing the past: the Confucian historiography of Joseon Korea's scholar-bureaucrats, which they blamed for perpetuating a servile worldview centered around China, and Japanese colonial historiography, which portrayed Korea as historically dependent and culturally backward.

The work of these prewar nationalist historians has shaped postwar historiography in both North and South Korea. Despite ideological differences between the two regimes, the dominant historiography in both countries since the 1960s has continued to reflect nationalist themes, and this common historical outlook is the basis for talks about Korean unification. In the process of trying to reject Japanese colonial scholarship, Korean nationalist historians have adopted many of its premises. Shin Chaeho's irredentist claims over Manchuria, however, have not made it into the mainstream.

Korean nationalist historiography was welcomed by both the left and right sides of South Korea in the 20th century, but in the 21st century, the Korean nationalist historiography was increasingly associated with leftist nationalism, which was critical of anti-communist conservatism.

== Historical context ==
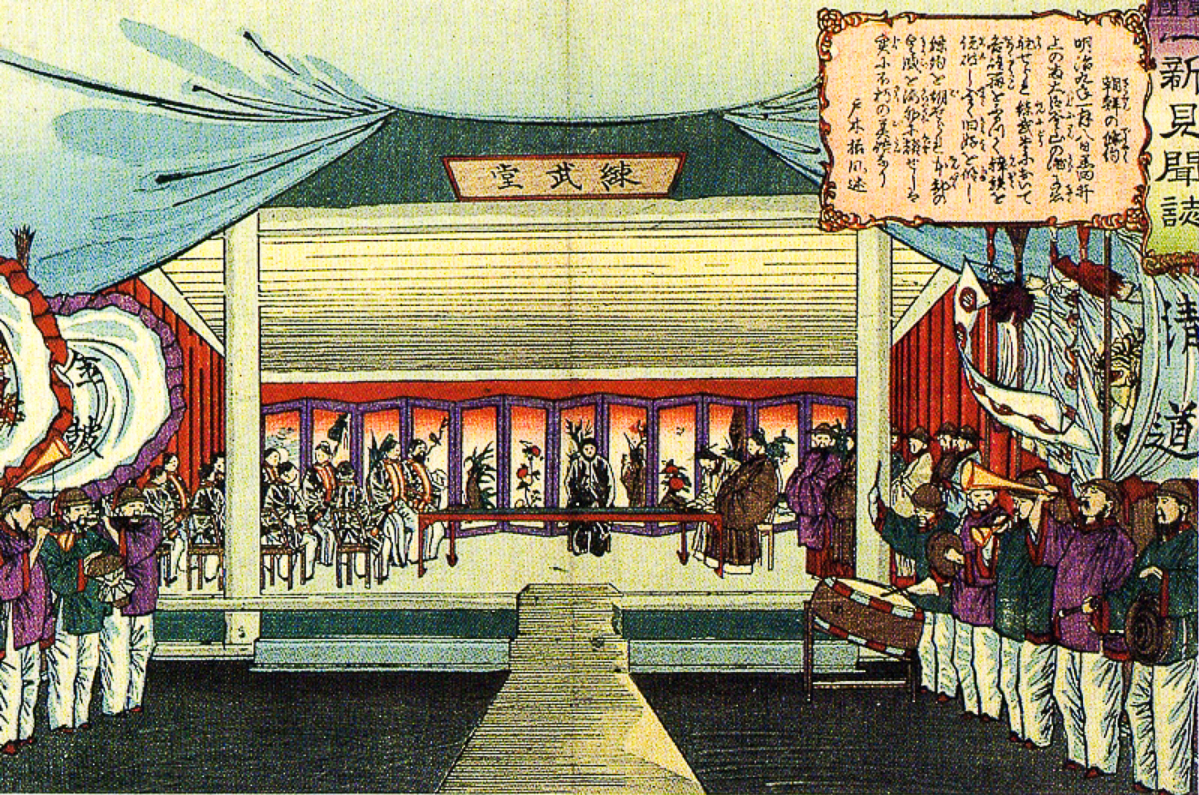
A Japanese depiction of the signing of the Ganghwa Treaty (1876) between Meiji Japan and Joseon Korea, which opened Korea to foreign trade.

The late nineteenth century was a time of domestic crises and external threats for Joseon Korea (1392–1910). Starting in the 1860s, a series of rebellions caused by excessive taxation and misgovernment threatened the reigning dynasty, while foreign powers — mostly western countries, but also Meiji Japan — used military force to try to open Korea to trade. The Japan–Korea Treaty of 1876 opened three Korean ports to commerce and granted Japanese merchants extraterritoriality in these ports. This unequal treaty prompted even more foreign interventions, as it turned Korea into a target of rivalry between imperialist powers. One crucial issue was whether Korea was a sovereign state or a Chinese dependency. Joseon was a tributary of the Ming (1368–1644) and subsequently the Qing (1644–1911), obliging tribute missions and ritual subordination of the Korean king to the Chinese emperor, yet Korea maintained independent domestic and foreign policy, an ambiguity frustrating western powers.

To appease tensions, China and Japan signed the Convention of Tientsin (1882), in which both parties agreed not to send more troops to Korea. In 1884, however, Korean reformers supported by Japanese legation guards tried to depose King Gojong (r. 1863–1907), but Chinese troops stationed in Korea intervened quickly to foil the coup. Ten years later, the Donghak Peasant Rebellion exploded and once again put the Joseon regime in difficulty. King Gojong asked China to send troops to help repress it, but Japan, under the pretext of protecting its interests in the peninsula, sent even more. In July 1894 Japanese forces seized the Korean king and forced him to establish a cabinet that implemented extensive institutional reforms. One of these reforms consisted in establishing the Bureau of History (Pyeonsaguk 編史局), which would play a role in later controversies over history. Japan's attack on Chinese forces a few days later started the Sino-Japanese War, which was fought over who would control the Korean peninsula. The war ended with a resounding Japanese victory confirmed by the Treaty of Shimonoseki (1895), which forced China to recognize the independence of Joseon Korea. But Korea's escape from the China-centered world order simply cleared the way for Japanese imperialist domination.

== History of Korean nationalist historiography ==
=== Precursors (before 1895) ===
During the later half of the Joseon dynasty (1392–1897), many scholars became disenchanted with Sinocentrism and became more conscious of Korea's uniqueness and independence. This trend became known as the silhak ("pragmatic learning") movement. The most important pre-1895 precursor to the rise of nationalist historiography was the erosion of Sinocentrism during the silhak movement.

Non-Sinocentric historiographical ideas began to arise in the works of the scholars Hong Tae-yong (1731–1783), Yi Chong-hwi (1731–1786), Pak Chiwŏn (1737–1805), Yu Deuk-gong (1749–1807), Chŏng Yagyong (1762–1836), and Yi Kyu-gyŏng (李圭景, 1788–1856). Hong Tae-yong rejected the sacrosanct idea of Sinocentrism that China was superior to all other nations, and argued that all nations were equals. Hong's contemporary Chong Yag-yong argued that any nation excelling in culture could define itself as the "center", and further argued that because Korea had already reached this level of cultural development, it could therefore be called the "center". He also emphasized the importance of additional education in Korean texts such as Samguk Sagi (12th century) rather than the Chinese Classics alone. Park Ji-won lamented that the prevailing Korean historians of his day were beholden to Zhu Xi's Neo-Confucian framework, which placed China at the center of the international system. He provided a fresh perspective on the historical territory of Korea as extending beyond the Yalu river into Manchuria. Yi Kyu-gyŏng appealed to intellectuals to write a comprehensive history of Korea within the interpretative framework of independent national identity.

The most representative silhak historiographical work is Yi Ik's (1681–1763) Dongsa Gangmok ("Essentials of the History of the Eastern Country"), which although written in a neo-Confucian framework, demonstrates a more critical than apologetic tone towards the early Joseon dynasty and its establishment.

=== 1895–1945 ===
==== 1895–1905 ====
Contemporary Korean historians trace the roots of nationalist historiography to the Korean independence movement, which emerged in response to the rise of Japanese influence in Korea after Japan's victory in the Sino-Japanese War (1894–1895). Starting in 1895, Korean newspapers started to foster new ways of imagining Korea. In 1896 Seo Jae-pil (1864–1951) and Yun Chi-ho (1864–1945) founded the bilingual (English-Korean) Tongnip Sinmun (the Independent), which was the first Korean newspaper to be published in Hangul. Seo and Yun, who had both come into contact with ideas of "nation" and "independence" during their studies in the United States, tried to promote national consciousness among Koreans, partly through historical education. In 1899 the newspaper translated into vernacular Korean an essay "On Patriotism" that Chinese journalist and historian Liang Qichao had recently published in Japan. But such calls for "Korean political unity and racial solidarity" in turn-of-the-century newspapers were censored by Japanese colonial authorities. The Tongnip Sinmun was thus forced to close later in 1899. Japanese authorities also suppressed private schools that tried to promote patriotism through the teaching of Korean history, language, and customs.

Social Darwinist ideas of struggle between races were also among the new intellectual currents influencing Koreans at the time. They were introduced to Korea in the 1880s by intellectuals who had traveled or studied in Japan. Their first two proponents were Yu Kil-chun (1856–1914) and Yun Chi-ho (1864–1945), who had both been to Japan in the spring of 1881 as members of Eo Yun-jung's (어윤중, 魚允中; 1848–1896) Courtiers' Observation Mission (조사 시찰단, 朝士視察團), which the Korean royal court had dispatched to observe the Meiji reforms. Yun mentioned ideas on the Korean "race" in editorials published in Tongnip Sinmun, but not enough to disseminate these ideas widely. Indeed, until the imposition of a Japanese protectorate on Korea in 1905, the Pan-Asianist view that Koreans and Japanese, as members of the "yellow race," were allies in a struggle against the "white race," was more salient in Korean newspapers than portrayals of Koreans as racially distinct from the Japanese.

==== Japanese colonial historiography ====
Mainstream Japanese historiography arose out of a fusion of Western historiography, as introduced by the German Ludwig Riess in 1887, and the Chinese scholarly tradition of evidential research (kaozheng 考證 or kōshōgaku 考證學), which had been established in Japan since the Edo period (1603–1868). The field of Japanese East Asian historiography (Tōyōshi), led by Shiratori Kurakichi 白鳥庫吉 (1865–1942), largely embraced negative, orientalist Western views of China and Korea, setting Japan apart from both Asia and the West while asserting its equality with the West. What Korean historians refer to as Japanese "colonial historiography" can be traced to Tokyo Imperial University's 1890 history of Japan, the Kokushi gan 國史眼, which argued for a common ancestry to Koreans and Japanese (Nissen dōsoron). Based on the Kojiki and Nihon Shoki chronicles, the Kokushi gan asserted that the legendary figures Susanoo, the brother of Emperor Jimmu, and Empress Jingū had ruled or invaded Silla (Korea). Such views of Korea's historical subjugation to Japan became widely accepted in Japanese scholarship, and integral to Japan's national history, as it was presented in other books of Japan's Meiji era (1868–1912), such as Ōtori Keisuke's Chōsen kibun 朝鮮紀聞 (1885), and Hayashi Taisuke's 林泰輔 Chōsenshi 朝鮮史 (1892), made similar arguments. Another theme in Japanese historical scholarship on Korea was Korea's backwardness, which was first argued by the economist Tokuzō Fukuda in 1902, who said that Joseon was equivalent to Japan in the Heian period (794–1185).

From the time of the Japan–Korea Treaty of 1876, the Empire of Japan became increasingly involved in Korean affairs. After the Russo-Japanese War in 1905 opened Manchuria (northeast China) to Japanese colonization, Japan began promoting the idea of a joint and inseparable "Manchurian-Korean history" (Mansenshi 滿鮮史). In this theory of Manchurian-Korean history, developed by Inaba Iwakachi in the 1920s and 1930s, Korea was subjected to various forces of heteronomy in politics and economics, and thus lacked "independence and originality". Official imperial involvement in Korean historiography began in 1915, through the Chungch'uwon office. Saitō Makoto, the Japanese Governor-General of Korea, targeted Korean ethnic nationalist historians (minjok sahakka) such as Shin Chae-ho, Choe Nam-seon, and Yi Gwangsu, as part of a "cultural containment" policy since the March 1st demonstrations for independence in 1919. The Governor-General's education office published a 35-volume work called Chōsenjin, which argued that Koreans should be assimilated to Japan; Japanese intellectuals proposed refashioning Korean names to Japanese style to serve this end. In 1922, the Governor-General established a committee which compiled a 35-volume "History of Chosŏn" (Chosenshi). The Chosenshi was mostly composed of extracts from Chinese, Japanese, and Korean historical sources, and was used as a primary source for historical works on Korea in the Japanese period. Japanese administrators also surveyed artifacts of historical value on the Korean Peninsula (koseki chosa jigyo 古蹟調查事業) and sought to disprove the popular belief in the Dangun figure of Korean culture. A popular portrayal of Koreans in Japanese historiography was that of the sadaejuui, or as being extremely servile to foreign powers, particularly China.

==== Shin Chaeho and Korean nationalist historiography ====
The polemicist Shin Chaeho (1880–1936) found both Confucian historiography and Japanese colonial scholarship unsatisfactory on political, rather than academic, grounds, and proposed instead the Korean "race" (minjok) as an alternative subject of analysis. Shin believed that Koreans of his time had a "slavish mentality" as a result of centuries of historical, political, and cultural dependence on China, and he prescribed as a cure an identification with the Korean nation and the state, so that this community could be goaded to collective political activism.

In both North and South Korea, Shin Chaeho is credited as the first historian to make the Korean ethnicity the center of Korean historiography, the Koreanist Charles K. Armstrong notes that Shin is "considered the father of modern Korean historiography. He received a typical Confucian education, but left Joseon for China after the Japan–Korea Annexation Treaty in 1910. Inspired by his visits to the Goguryeo ruins and Mount Baekdu (Changbai) on the Chinese side of the border, he published Korean nationalist tracts in exile until his death in 1936.

Among the new intellectual currents influencing Koreans during Japanese rule, a version of Social Darwinism promulgated by the Chinese historian Liang Qichao was influential among nationalist journalist-historians like Shin Chaeho, Choe Nam-seon, and Park Eun-sik. Liang taught that the world was divided between peoples who were expansionist and influential, such as the Anglo-Saxons and Germans, and those peoples who were weak and insignificant. The themes of struggle for existence (saengjŏn kyŏngjaeng), survival of the fittest (yangyuk kangsik) and natural selection (ch'ŏntaek) inspired not only Shin's own historical views, but also those the Korean "self-strengthening movement" (chagang undong), which operated in similar terms to that in China and in Japan. Shin was also influenced by Liang's "Methods for the Study of Chinese History" (Zhongguo lishi yangjiufa, 1922), from which many of Shin's methods derive. He wrote his own history of Korea which broke from Confucian tradition, whose purveyors he decried as "effete" and disconnected from Korea's "manly" tradition going back to the ancient "Korean" expansionist kingdom of Goguryeo. Shin felt that Confucian historiography, and especially that of Kim Pusik and his alleged pro-Silla bias, suppressed a valid Korean claim to Manchurian territory, which not only had Goguryeo possessed, but Shin conceived as a central stage of Korean history, and a measure of the minjok's strength. Moreover, it was the act of writing history that caused Koreans not to rise up and conquer Manchuria again, according to Shin, resulting in a "great country becoming a small country, a great people becoming a small people". Yet he also criticized the shin sach'e textbooks after the Confucians, who nonetheless treated Japan sympathetically, translated Japanese historical works, and reflected the Japanese worldview. He also criticized Pan-Asianism as a guise for Japanese expansionism and regarded East Asia as a mere geographic unit, rather than a basis for solidarity. As a result, his new history focused on both "national struggle" rather than on the rise and fall of political dynasties, and emphasizing Korea's separateness from China and Japan, as he argued that historiography "should promote national spirit and independence". The fellow historians Park Eun-sik (1859–1925) and Chang Chi-yŏng likewise attempted to rectify the "slave literary culture" (noyejŏk munhwa sasang) of the yangban to reflect historical Korea's supposed martial tradition.

After the Japanese annexation, some Korean intellectuals chose to retreat into a life of glorifying Korea's cultural expanse in the past, rather than active collaboration or open resistance with the new authorities. Choe Nam-seon, the founder of the Association for Korea's Glorious Literature (Chosŏn Kwangmunhoe) and Park Eun-sik were representative of a new school of historians called the nationalist historians (Minjok sahakka), who bemoaned the decline of the Joseon dynasty and aimed to raise national consciousness to achieve Korean independence. Despite their designation as historians, many prominent figures in the movement did not have formal historical training, made extreme claims that "had little chance to withstand the rigorous test of objective historical criticism", and saw history as a political weapon to serve the aims of achieving Korean independence. Shin Chaeho often revised existing history and mythology to support his ideal of historical Korean autonomy, and where he could not find it, or where there were contradictions, blamed it on "lost" or "falsified" records, a technique which he accused Kim Pusik of. These historians preferred the folkloric Samguk Yusa as a source over the court-sanctioned Samguk Sagi, blaming the sagi's compiler for distorting Korean history to Confucian and sadaejuui (pro-China) ends. Choe's historical research, which he believed should not be unbiased, was motivated by the desire to refute Japanese kokugaku scholarship that emphasized those periods where Korea was under foreign domination. Among nationalist scholars, Shin chose to adapt techniques of that Japanese scholarship, including the use of the derogatory exonym Shina to debase China. An Hwak (安廓), another Korean nationalist, inverted Japanese historiographical tropes, such as by arguing that the supposed factionalism of the late Joseon was an embryonic form of modern party politics. In 1914, Kim Kyo-hŏn (金教獻) wrote the first nationalist history of Korea, from Dangun to the late Joseon, called "A Popular History of the God Tan'gun" (Shindan minsa 神檀民史). Because of Japanese censorship, the writing of nationalist histories was conflated with anti-colonial resistance.

Korean historians charge Japanese colonialist historiography of four main distortions: of giving a leading role to Chinese, Manchurian, and Japanese actors in the history of Korea (t'ayulsŏngron); of portraying Korean society as stagnant and even pre-feudal (chŏngch'esŏngron); of documenting factionalism within Korean political culture (tangp'asŏng-ron); and of alleging common Korean and Japanese ancestry (ilsŏn tongjoron) in order to justify the Japanese colonization of Korea. Yi Ki-baek summarizes Japanese colonialist historiography as stemming from the assumptions of "stagnation, nondevelopment, peninsula particularism, and unoriginality".

After Shin's death, historians who wrote in his tradition would be called "New Nationalists" (shin minjokchuŭi) of the "Korean Studies" movement. In the 1930s, alternative schools emerged, including Marxist historiography and a Western-based, scientific approach (Chindan hakhoe). The scholars from the Chindan hakhoe (Chindan Academic Society), including Yi Pyŏng-do, Yi Sang-baek, Kim Sang-gi, and Kim Sŏk-hyŏng, were trained at universities in Japan or at Keijō Imperial University in Seoul and published in Japanese journals, following objective Rankean ideas that challenged Japanese colonial historiography. On the other hand, the New Nationalists included figures such as Chŏng In-bo (鄭寅普) and An Chae-hong (安在鴻), the first of which had a classical Chinese education, rather than at a social science department at a university in Korea or Japan. They emphasized "independent self-spirit" (chashim), in contrast to neo-Confucian and Western-style scholarship, which represented for Chŏng a "dependent spirit (t'ashim).

=== After World War II ===
The surrender of Japan at the end of World War II handed Korea its independence, but the peninsula was immediately divided into ideologically opposed regimes in North and South Korea. At first, Marxist historians focusing on class analysis dominated historical writing in the north, whereas Syngman Rhee's staunchly anti-Communist government (1948–1960) also made the notion of minjok less central to historiography in the south. In North Korea class analysis was displaced by nationalist analysis in the 1950s, soon after the Korean War. In South Korea, the fall of the Rhee regime in 1960 and the anti-Japan protests triggered by the normalization of diplomatic ties with Japan in 1965 also reinstated the minjok as a "unifying framework" for developing an anti-colonial historiography. Since then, historical studies in both North and South have displayed a "pervasive and intense nationalistic tone" despite ideological differences between the two countries. This shared historical outlook has served as a backdrop to North Korea–South Korea relations, as in June 2000 when both Korean heads of state stated that Korean unification was a historical imperative.

==== North Korea ====
After independence in 1945, the "far more militant" nationalist tone in North Korean historical scholarship, as compared to South Korean historiography, allows such scholarship to be categorized as nationalist, rather than Marxist. The North Korean leader Kim Il Sung commissioned historians as propagandists to glorify the ancient Goguryeo kingdom's feats against Tang dynasty China, as well as the more recent anti-Japanese struggle in northeast China (Manchuria). Kim was part of the Northeast Anti-Japanese United Army led by the Chinese Communist Party, of which he was a member, but this history was later replaced with his unverifiable claim to have led a "Korean People's Revolutionary Army" (Chosŏn inmin hyŏngmyŏnggun), the details of which strike a similarity to the Northeast Anti-Japanese People's Revolutionary Army which was led by a Chinese. North Korean history of Kim Il Sung's exploits in Manchurian exile contain omissions, implausibilities, and forgeries, as well as a subtext of wandering and salvation (of the minjok) that has been compared with Christian and Greek mythology. According to Gi-Wook Shin, Kim Jong Il's "blood-based nationalism" is descended from the ideas of the historians Shin Chaeho, Yi Gwangsu, and Choe Nam-seon.

There are likewise similarities—although unacknowledged because of the Kim personality cult— between Kim's emphasis juche (chuch'e) self-reliance ideology and Shin's idea of "autonomous spirit" (chuch'e ŭi chŏngsin) and denigration of servile sadaejuui. It is also from these concepts where Inter-Korean charges and countercharges of "dependence" originate. The geographical location of Kim's government in northern Korea has helped it to promote nationalist histories featuring Goguryeo and other Manchurian states to shore up its own legitimacy. The most authoritative history in North Korea, the Chosŏn t'ongsa (1977 edition) justifies its disproportionate treatment of Goguryeo, especially relative to the traditionally-venerated contemporaneous Silla, "because the Korean people were strongest under the [Goguryeo] rules".

The Chosŏn t'ongsa also challenges the traditional view of "Unified Silla" as having unified Korea, stating that the regime only "the southern part of the national land", and that by allying with Tang dynasty China, it "brought in the foreign enemies and... committed a serious crime before the Korean people". As a result of the Goguryeo–Tang War, it continues, Korea "lost no small amount of territory to the aggressors", referring to the lands occupied by Balhae after the collapse of Goguryeo, although North Korea considers Balhae to be Korean. Since the 1950s, North Korean historiography has abandoned class analysis in favor of nationalistic categories, in accordance with the leading juche ideology. Before then, North Korean scholarship concerned itself with fitting Marxist historiography to Korean history, but in 1966, the North Korean dean of historians deemed one controversy on how to reconcile Marxist historiography with national history as a task more relevant to Slavs and Germans than to Koreans. North Korean historiography began to take a more nationalistic aspects and took Manchuria as its geographical center; and important historical controversies began to be settled without debate or discussion. In contrast to the Communist Manifesto, which begins "The history of all hitherto existing society is the history of class struggles", a standard North Korean history text reads, "Human history is a history of struggle of the people for Chajusŏng [autonomy or independence]". According to Charles K. Armstrong, this conception of history is more similar to Shin Chaeho's conception of the "I" versus the "non-I" than to Marxism.

This history writing denied the influences of Chinese civilization on Korea, and called for a correction of ancient Korean history based on the juche ideology of self-reliance. North Korean historiography on modern Korea has mostly featured unverifiable claims about the heroic nationalist acts of the Kim Il Sung family, such as that one of Kim's ancestors led a mob to burn an American naval ship in 1866. In North Korean historiography, this attack marks the beginning of Korean modern history (kŭndaesa). Mount Baekdu, which is almost always juxtaposed with Kim's son Kim Jong Il, has been increasingly featured in North Korean "mythography" since the 1960s, and more rapidly since the 1970s, associating the leader with Dangun, the supposed progenitor of the Korean race. However, it has also been used to praise the silhak reformist Chŏng Tasan as a patriot in the North, because Tasan wanted to end Joseon's participation in the Imperial Chinese tributary system. Tasan himself was an advocate of a "people-oriented" (minbon) theory of history. A 1970 speech by Kim's son Kim Jong Il to the Workers' Party of Korea emphasized that "we should ensure that things of the past are shown or taught to our people so as to contribute to their education in socialist patriotism" (sahoe chuŭi chŏk aeguk chuŭi).

==== South Korea ====
Korean nationalist historiography has dominated the field of Korean studies in the Republic of Korea (South Korea) since 1945. From 1945 to the late 1960s, South Korean national historiography began to move away from biographies of heroic figures in the Korean independence movement towards analyzing nationalist incidents such as the March 1st Movement. Still, South Korean nationalist historiography aims to refute what historian Lee Ki-baek called a "colonial view of Korean history", to which Japanese and foreign scholars supposedly still subscribed. One such "colonial view" was that the Goryeo dynasty (918–1392) was stagnant, which nationalist historians studied Goryeo institutions to try to refute with evidence of dynamism and change. But there are more than twice the number of articles and monographs on the Joseon than there are for Goryeo, since South Korean historians assume that there was a potential fundamental, irreversible change from traditionalism to modernism during that time. This change, so say historians like Choe Yŏng-hŭi, which inhibited by the various Japanese invasions from the 16th century and ultimate annexation, which they blame for social instability and armed banditry. Kim Chol-choon, writing in 1970, evaluated the state of South Korean historiography as lacking a "critical spirit". In 1978, nationalist historian Kang Man'gil challenged the existing periodization of South Korean history into "colonial" and "postliberation" blocs, instead suggesting that the second half of the 20th century should be characterized as one of "division", preceding the creation of a unified, ethnic Korean state. His attack on the "colonial" Korean historiography proposed a new "self-determining historiography" (chuch'ejŏk sagwan). Since the 1970s, fringe elements in the South Korean historical community have also tried to resurrect Shin's irredentist focus on Manchuria. The normalization of China–South Korea relations and visits to Koreans in China have increased interest in the region, although efforts at "Recovering the Ancient Lands", as one irredentist author puts it, are marginal in the public sphere.

The official History of the Republic of Korea portrayed the Korean people as center-stage in their own "liberation" against a small number of collaborators, giving the Allies of World War II a peripheral role. Authoritarian governments in South Korea interfered heavily in historical scholarship, "aggravat[ing] the traditionally conformist nature of established scholarship" by making such topics as the popularity of Communism in 1930s and 1940s Korea taboo. Since the democratization of South Korea in 1987, scholars continue to publish nationalist histories, and the hegemonic portrayal of Japanese rule as oppressive to Korean culture has not changed, although a few Korean scholars have questioned the "collaboration-resistance" dichotomy. From the 1980s to Kim Dae-jung's presidency in 1998, most South Korean historians of collaborationism agreed with the idea that "the nation's history was kidnapped" at independence "by a clique of pro-Japanese stooges", who were shielded by the United States Army Military Government in Korea and Syngman Rhee from the Anti-Traitors Investigation Committee. Recent political campaigns such as the establishment of a presidential commission in 2005 to identify and shame collaborators have entrenched national history as the dominant form of historiography. The state retains the most powerful purveyor of historical memory in South Korea, launching for example a campaign in 2010 to "remember with the people the proud history of establishing simultaneously national sovereignty, democracy and economic development, something unique in the world", a self-legitimizing narrative that excludes the history of the Korean War and Korean democracy activists against the South Korean state. However, some historians of the South Korean New Right, such as Lee Young-hoon, are challenging the nation-centered history by proposing a state-centered history which promotes patriotic pride (aegukshim, 愛國心) for South Korea's economic accomplishments rather than shame for the failure of unifying Koreans. Im Chihyŏn is another contemporary advocate, though of different ideological background, for the "democratization" (minjuhwa 民主化) of historiography by its liberation from the "monolithic nation" paradigm. He is critical, however, of South Korea's democratic governments' efforts to reconcile (kwagŏ ch’ŏngsan) the state's past of White Terror.

Postcolonial South Korean nationalist historians also sought to divide Koreans during the Japanese administration into categories of self-serving collaborator or self-sacrificing nationalist resisters. The first major challenge to the hegemonic state-endorsed, nationalist historiography came not from a Korean but from the American Bruce Cumings, who wrote the 1981 book Origins of the Korean War. Cumings recalled facing heavy resistance to his revisionist historiography including, "that the mere mention of the idea that Japan somehow 'modernized' Korea calls forth indignant denials, raw emotions, and the sense of mayhem having just been, or about to be committed."

== Themes ==
The writings of Shin Chaeho outlined the themes for later nationalist historiography, including the ancientness and distinctiveness of Koreans; the long history of Koreans warding off "foreign aggression"; and the portrayal of Koreans "as an essential part of world history".

=== The Korean minjok ===
The main goal of Korean nationalist historiography (minjok sahak) in South Korea since 1945 was to write "a new racial history of Korean independence" that would refute earlier Japanese scholarship on Korea (Ilchesagwan). The idea of a Korean race, or people, entered into Korean vocabulary in the late 1890s with the word minjok. Prior to the 19th century, according to Carter Eckert, "there was little, if any, feeling of loyalty toward the abstract concept of 'Korea' as a nation-state, or toward fellow inhabitants of the peninsula as 'Koreans'". Loyalty to village, family, and king took precedence for ordinary people, while Korean elites considered themselves as members of a "cosmopolitan civilization centered on China".

The coming of the nation state system to East Asia, during which Korea was corporated into Meiji Japan, prompted Korean activists to "redefine Korea in terms of internal homogeneity and external autonomy". In Shin Chaeho's 1908 essay Doksa Sillon ("A new way of reading history"), Shin equated Korean history (kuksa) with that of the Korean nation (minjoksa), attempting to redirect people's loyalties to that category which he asserted always existed in history. For example, Shin asserted that Myocheong's rebellion (1135–1136) against Goryeo which was crushed by Kim Pusik as a "nationalist" rebellion. Myocheong had demanded that Goryeo move its capital north to sŏgyŏng (modern Pyongyang) and take a more aggressive stance against the Liao and Jin dynasties to the north, which Kim felt would undermine the security of the Goryeo state. Shin's later work, from the Chosŏn sanggo munhwasa, showed more critical evaluation of primary sources, using methods from archaeology, epigraphy, and comparative linguistics, and relying less on Daejonggyo (Dangun-worship) scripture.

==== Ancientness and Inner Asian connection ====
Nationalist historiography considers the Yemaek the beginning of the "unity of race, culture, and statehood in the prehistoric Korean peninsula", overlooking the presence of the contemporary Upper Xiajiadian culture (1000–600 BCE) and Lower Xiajiadian culture (2200–1600 BCE) in Liaodong. Following the Japanese colonial paradigm of indigenism, Korean nationalist historiography asserts more and more ancient origins for Koreans in order to prove Korean cultural legitimacy. Such a search for "the racial origins" of Koreans mirrors the Japanese concept of kokutai ("national essence"), which was part of kokugaku scholarship. For Shin, the search for an ideal time in antiquity was not to when there was Confucian peace and stability—as in Chinese historiography's valorization of Emperors Yao and Shun—but when the Korean minjok controlled the most territory. The retro-projection of 20th century concepts of race and ethnicity onto ancient Korea has resulted in a "complex jumble of contradictory narratives filled with Tan'gun fiction, competing dynastic myths, and hypothetical invasions of tribes, as well as unaccountable archaeological data... [that] has rendered it virtually impossible to distinguish fact from fiction in studies on ancient Korea." Nationalism has so pervaded mainstream historical scholarship in South Korea that Chinese characters, used exclusively to write the Korean language until recently, are relegated to footnotes in academic journals or excluded completely. Historical periodization in North Korea is concerned with proving the "superiority and advancedness" of Korean civilization by "pushing the beginning of each historical stage as far back as possible".

Korean nationalist historiography is connected with "popular archaeology" in South Korea, where television archaeologists competing for ratings make ever more-expansive claims to the limits of ancient Korea. For example, in 1993 the Korea Daily sponsored a trip of archaeologist Son Bo-gi of Yonsei University to Ulan Bator, Mongolia where Son claimed that he discovered a new Goguryeo stone fortress which proved that Goguryeo extended beyond the Greater Khingan range. Korean Bronze Age art has been connected by popular archaeologists, for example, to that of the Scythians, supposedly proving the "arrival of a superior northern race" into the Korean peninsula. Korean journalists and researchers also regularly travel along Silk Road sites in Central Asia searching for Korea's "Altaic roots". Choe Nam-seon, writing in the territorial tradition of Shin Chae-ho, argued that Korea was the center of the Purham culture which extended deep into Central Asia. According to Choe, the world was divided into Indo-European, Chinese, and "Părk" cultures (Purham munhwa kwŏn), the last of whom was a Korean Shinto-like religion that spread from the Black Sea through the Caspian Sea, Tian Shan, the Altai Mountains, down through Korea, Japan, and Okinawa. Choe alleged that Dangun was universally worshiped within this super-culture. However, according to Chizuko Allen, Choe did not examine the local cultures of any countries besides Korea, China, and Japan, and based this theory on phonetic similarities of geographical features. Choe's Purham culture theory has since been adopted by the independence activist and "Korean Studies movement" leader An Chae-hong.

==== Revised Korean founding myth ====
Around the mid-Joseon dynasty, the established view among historians traced Korean origins to Chinese refugees, considering Korean history that of a long series of kingdoms connected with China. As such, the Gija Joseon and Silla states were valorized, while the Gojoseon and Goguryeo states were not considered as important. According to this view, the first state in Korea, Gija Joseon, was founded by Jizi in 1122 BCE, who was a disgruntled Chinese advisor to the Shang dynasty. The story of how he brought poetry, music, medicine, trade, and a political system to the Korean peninsula was conceived similarly to the proposed Founding of Rome by the Trojan refugee Aeneas. But by the 1930s, under the influence of Shin Chaeho's histories, the Jizi Korean founding story became less popular than that of Dangun, the son of a tiger and a bear – the latter being common in Japanese folklore – who brought civilization to the Korean peninsula. Shin and the other historians who promulgated this myth had been influenced by Daejonggyo, a new religious movement which worshipped Dangun, but attacked pre-annexation textbook narratives of Dangun which portrayed him as the brother of the Japanese god Susanoo. To Shin, Dangun was both the founder of the Korean minjok and the first Korean state (kuk), and thus the necessary starting point for Korean history. In response to a challenge by the Japanese scholars Shiratori Kurakichi and Imanishi Ryū of Dangun as a fabrication by the author of the Samguk yusa, nationalist historian Choe Nam-seon attacked Japanese mythology as being built upon fabrications.

By focusing on a mythological god which founded a "sacred race" (shinsŏng chongjok), Korean nationalist historiography seeks to portray ancient Korea as a golden age of "gods and heroes" where Korea's cultural achievements rivaled those of China and Japan. Accordingly, Shin Chaeho elevated Dangun to play a similar role as did the Yellow Emperor in China and which Amaterasu does in Japan. Choe Nam-seon, according to his Purham culture theory, places Dangun even above the Chinese and Japanese emperors, because those rulers were supposedly Shamanistic rulers of the ancient Korean "Părk" tradition. The Dangun story also lends credence to claims that Korean heritage is over 5000 years old. According to Hyung Il Pai, the popularity of Dangun studies can be said to "reflect the progressively ultra-nationalistic trend in Korean historical and archaeological scholarship today". Shin Chaeho named Mount Changbai (Baekdu in Korean) on the Sino-Korean border as a part of Korean heritage, by virtue of connection with the mythical Dangun. Changbai, however, was already claimed by the Manchus of China's Qing dynasty since the 17th century for their origin myth, as well as by the Mongols, and the mountains are considered sacred in Han Chinese culture as well. This nationalist identification of Changbai/Baekdu with Koreans was cemented by the operation of Korean independence movement partisans operating from the Chinese border and retroactively legitimized with reference to the history of the Gojoseon and Balhae states. The Chinese civilizational connection to ancient Korea continues to be attacked by North Korean historians, who allege that the history of Gija Joseon was "viciously distorted by the feudal ruling class, the sadaejuui followers, and the big-power chauvinists".

==== Relationship with China and Japan ====
===== Distinctiveness from =====
Korean ethnic nationalism is based on the idea that Koreans have existed as a single unique homogeneous race (tan'il minjok) since ancient times. As part of an effort to create a narrative of Korean origins free from "racial contamination" from Chinese or Japanese, racial histories of Koreans published in Korea usually begin with the line "Koreans are not Japanese". As a result, the most politically correct proposed origins of Koreans are from southern Siberia (pukpang-gye), from the "South Sea", or mythological (as in the Dangun story). The most influential articulation of these nationalist theories of origin is Kim Chŏng-hak's "History of the formation of the Korean race" (1964); others include Kim Chŏng-bae (1976, 1987, 1990), Yi Ki-baek (1977, [with Yi Ki-dong] 1983), Kim Wŏl-lyong (1970, 1986, 1989b), Yun Mu-byŏng (1987), and Yi Chong-uk (1993). According to Shin Chaeho, the Korean people were the descendants of Dangun, who merged with the Buyeo (Fuyu) people of Manchuria and ended their development as the core of the Goguryeo people.

In nationalist historiography, Korea is valorized as having an indigenous culture separate from those of China and Japan. Evidence of Chinese cultural influence on Koreans, as well as of common ancestral origins for Koreans and Japanese, is denounced as an "evil plot" of "Japanese imperialistic historiography" (Ilche sagwan) to "annihilate the Korean people" (minjok malsal). Shin Chaeho strove to make "Korea" a primary, bounded unit of East Asian history, which he believed had been distorted by Confucian historians who measured Koreans by a graduation between Chinese and barbarian. Archaeologists in both North and South Korea have claimed, contrary to earlier scholarship, that Korea experienced a Bronze Age culture separate from that of China, with artifacts resembling those in Siberia and Manchuria.

===== Superiority over =====
Korea is alternatively portrayed in nationalist historiography as being continually victimized throughout history by China and Japan, but remaining morally, racially, and culturally superior to them, since they—and more recently, Western powers—tried and "failed to suppress Korea's national spirit". Shin Chaeho's work shows the influence of Social Darwinism by portraying history as a racial struggle between the "Buyeo" (Korean) minjok with that of the Xianbei, Chinese, Mohe, and Jurchen over territory. He praised historical figures who preserved or extended "Korean" control over Manchuria, and shamed those who did not, such as Muyeol of Silla. As a result, the search for heroes of the former led his Doksa Sillon to focus more on ancient, rather than recent history. Various self-designations for Koreans in the minjok struggle include "the good race" (sŏnmin) and "the chosen or delivered people" (paedal). In postcolonial North and South Korean historiography, there is a tendency to emphasize the "superiority" (ususŏng) and "advancedness" (sŏnjinsŏng) of Korea's historical development.

Nationalist historiography celebrates various victories of "Koreans" over "foreigners" including the Goguryeo–Sui War (612), Goguryeo–Tang War (645), Goryeo–Khitan War (1018), Korean-Jurchen wars (1107), Mongol invasions of Korea (1231–73), and Japanese invasions of Korea (1592–1598). Accordingly, military heroes such as Ŭlchi Mundŏk of Goguryeo—and indeed all the generals of the Three contemporary kingdoms of Goguryeo, Baekje, and Silla—are assigned a common, "national" identity of Korean. In the words of John Duncan, however, it is "extremely unlikely" that the people of those kingdoms would identify with "a larger, 'Korean' collectivity that transcended local boundaries and state loyalties". Yi Sang-ryong, who argued that history "raised the dignity of the country and fostered patriotism" (kungmin chŏngshin) claimed that during the "northern history" of Koreans in Manchuria, from the time of Dangun to Balhae, the Sushen (Suksin) and Japanese people were subordinate to Dangun.

Shin Chaeho has also argued for the existence of monotheism in ancient Korea, elevating Koreans to the "advanced" civilizations of the Middle East; however, this theory contradicts other nationalist historiography which propose Shamanism as an ancient Korean religion, as well as that of nearly all religious historians, who say Koreans were syncretist. Na Se-jin, Korea's most quoted physical anthropologist, asserted in 1964 that Koreans are superior in "looks, brains, bravery, stature, and strength" to the Chinese and Japanese, and resemble Europeans more than "Mongoloids", reflecting nationalist historiography's fixation on prehistorical racial roots. For Shin, the founding of Korea by such an antique figure as Dangun proved that Korea was more ancient that China; that Dangun colonized China proving that Korea was superior to China; and that mythical Chinese emperors and sages were really "Korean". Shin also reconceived the "Great Plan" (Hungfan chin ch'ou 洪範九疇) given by Jizi of Gija Joseon as being made by "a man of [Joseon]", turning China into an importer of Korean civilization, opposite to the traditional view.

=== Historical territory ===
==== Owning and transcending the peninsula ====
In his seminal work Doksa Sillon, Shin Chaeho redefined the subject of Korean national history from only the Korean Peninsula both towards the outer limits of "Manchuria" and to that of the "racially defined nation" (minjok). By defining Korean history as that of the minjok, he could argue that Goguryeo, Silla, and Baekje, despite frequent wars between each other, were "of the same minjok and consequently of the same history". However, the conception of a Korean nation as being bounded by the Yalu and Tumen rivers was reinforced by Confucian histories of Joseon that did not confer legitimacy on dynasties that held such extreme northern territory. Shin Chaeho particularly resented this confinement, considering the fall of Goguryeo and the loss of "Korean" control over its extrapeninsular territory as the beginning of the minjok's decline. He wrote: "When the Korean minjok obtains Manchuria, the Korean minjok is strong and prosperous. When another [Eastern or Northern] minjok obtains Manchuria... then Korea [Han'guk] enters that... [Eastern or Northern] minjok's sphere of power.... This is an iron rule that has not changed for four thousand years", a sentiment with which a large number of contemporary Koreans agree. In this lament, Shin found common cause with Imperial Japanese historians of the Mansenshi school, who wished to portray the Korean peninsula and the Asian continent as inseparable, but with the obverse goal of undermining ideas of Korean independence. Not only did Shin, but also the fellow nationalist historian Park Eun-sik consider Manchuria the foundation on which to build a powerful "Greater Korea".

At the same time, however, nationalist historiography presupposes that any polity inhabiting the Korean peninsula was "Korean"; and that all of the inhabitants of the peninsula were unchangingly and homogeneously "Korean" for "5000 years". E. Taylor Atkins criticizes these assumptions as "no less questionable than those that Japanese colonial scholars brought", and as contributing to modern territorial disputes with China and Japan. Historical study of Jeju Island, Ulleungdo, and the Liancourt Rocks (Dokdo), commensurate with their conception as Korean since the late Joseon, served the timely needs of maritime defense.

==== Interpretation of Balhae as Korean ====
During the mid-Joseon dynasty, Pak Chiwŏn denied the fact that the Han dynasty's territories extended south of the Yalu, and criticized Kim Pusik for excluding Balhae (Bohai in Chinese) in Manchuria from the history of Korea, arguing that Balhae were "descendants" of Goguryeo. Yi Kyu-gyŏng argued that the exclusion of Balhae from Korean history was "a grave error" since "it occupied a vast area". In the Joseon dynasty's later years, an increasing number of Korean historians included Balhae as part of Korean history, despite stating that the founders of Balhae were Mohe people and were considered "them" and not "us" In the 18th century, the divide was such that the scholars Yi Ik and An Chŏngbok adamantly refused to consider Balhae part of Korean history, while Sin Kyŏngjun and Yu Deuk-gong fully incorporated it. One century later, Han Ch'iyun (韓致淪) and Han Chinsŏ (韓鎭書) would include Balhae as equal in Korean history to such uncontroversially Korean dynasties like Silla. Shin Chaeho criticized the Samguk Sagi for excluding Balhae and the Buyeo kingdom (Chinese: Fuyu, another Manchurian state) from Korean history. He interpreted Balhae's defeat by the Khitan-led Liao dynasty as having caused "half of our ancestor [Dangun]'s ancient lands... [loss] for over nine hundred years". North Korean scholars—and more recently some in the South—have recently tried to incorporate Balhae history as an integral part of Korean history by challenging the view of Unified Silla as the unification of Korea. According to this narrative, Goryeo was the first unification of Korea, since Balhae still existed while occupying former Goguryeo territory north of the Korean peninsula.

==== Denial of ancient Han dynasty presence ====
The demonization of Japanese historical and archaeological findings in Korea as imperialist forgeries owes in part to those scholars' discovery of the Lelang Commandery—by which the Han dynasty administered territory near Pyongyang—and insistence that this Chinese commandery had a major influence on the development of Korean civilization. Until the North Korean challenge, it was universally accepted that Lelang was a commandery established by Emperor Wu of Han after he defeated Gojoseon in 108 BCE. To deal with the Han dynasty tombs, North Korean scholars have reinterpreted them as the remains of Gojoseon or Goguryeo. For those artifacts that bear undeniable similarities to those found in Han China, they propose that they were introduced through trade and international contact, or were forgeries, and "should not by any means be construed as a basis to deny the Korean characteristics of the artifacts". The North Koreans also say that there were two Lelangs, and that the Han actually administered a Lelang on the Liao River on the Liaodong peninsula, while Pyongyang was an "independent Korean state" of Lelang, which existed between the 2nd century BCE until the 3rd century CE. The traditional view of Lelang, according to them, was expanded by Chinese chauvinists and Japanese imperialists.

==== Claims on Liaodong and other Chinese territories ====
Shin Chae-ho drew on irredentist themes from Imperial Japanese historiography, which argued for territorial expansion based on past control. To justify a Greater Japan, the Japanese historian Kume Kunitake criticized the notion of Japan as an island state, proposing that Japan had governed Korea and southeastern China in the past. Shin's historiography justified a Greater Korea with reference to territories Korea had supposedly held in the past, which Shin took to mean—from Baekje: western Liaodong, Shandong, Jiangsu, Zhejiang, and the surrounding areas; and from Silla: northeastern Jilin. He felt that Unified Silla, Goryeo, and Joseon were not true "unifications" of the Korean people as had been previously thought, but only "semi-" or "half-" unifications (panp'yonjok t'ongil), with a full unification yet unfulfilled since the times of Dangun. Earlier, Pak Chiwŏn argued that Liaodong and other territories above the Yalu River should be considered historical Korean territory, or else Korea would lose more territory. Yi Kyu-gyŏng believed that the Liaodong Peninsula was "irrefutably" ancient Korean territory because the Korean name for Liaodong was Samhan (Korean: 삼한; Hanja: 三韓), or "Three Korean States". Nationalist scholars asserted Korean ownership of Liaodong and the surrounding area based on the Chinese dynastic History of Liao and History of Jin. However, mainstream acceptance of claims to Manchurian territory in Korea occurred only when the Empire of Japan expanded into north and northeast China. Colonial Japanese scholars such as Iwakichi Inaba, Shiratori Kurakichi, Torii Ryūzō, Imanishi Ryū, and Ikeuchi Hiroshi declared that there was one unified "Manchurian-Korean history" (Mansen-shi).

The South Korean Yun Nae-hyŏn proposed in 1985 that Gojoseon lasted for two thousand years from before 2333 BCE, stretching from Hebei in north China to all of Korea. Important dissenters to the Liaodong-as-Korean view during Joseon included Chŏng Yagyong, who argued that Liaodong was "superfluous" to Korea's natural river borders; and Yi Ik, who regarded irredentism against China as a "greedy ambition" that could lead to trouble in the future; against the nationalist historians of 1910 who bemoaned the "loss" of Manchuria and decline of the Korean minjok, An Hwak represented a dissenting voice. The Daejonggyo cult of Dangun wrote "historical tales" (sahwa) which influenced Korean nationalist historiography of the 20th century. The pan-Dongyi pan-Northeast Asian arguments of the sahwa included the assertion that the Korean nation included "not only the Korean peninsula and Manchuria, but also northeastern China", considering the emperors of Shun, Liao, Jin, Yuan, and Qing as part of Korean history. This expanded concept of the Korean nation was included in Kim Kyo-hŏn's Korean history textbooks intended to boost the morale of military cadets studying in exile in China. According to Kim, since all these peoples who led the dynasties originated in Manchuria—unlike, say, Jizi of Gija Joseon—, they are all descendants of Dangun, and thus part of the Korean minjok's "northern" branch of history. As a result, he considered all the lands conquered by those peoples, including most lately "the land of the Han, Mongolia, the territory of the Hui, and Tibet" all the way down to Burma as included in the territory of the Korean minjok. Yi Sang-ryong made a number of arguments in common with Shin, Kim Kyohŏn and Park Eun-sik: that the Manchu people were actually Korean; that the Four Commanderies of Han were located in Liaodong and not "Korean" territory; and that some portion of Korean history should be centered in Manchuria, with the goal of creating a greater Joseon state which included the territory. Shin argued that the "trends in geographical history" portended future Korean control over former Goguryeo territories, and advocated Korean emigration to "relight" (chunggwang) the lost history of Dangun. As a result of peasant uprisings, famines, and Imperial Japanese encouragement, Korean immigration to Manchuria soared from 1860, reaching 400,000 Koreans by 1920; 900,000 by 1931, and over two million by 1945.

Korean nationalist historiography which holds the subjugation of Manchuria by Korean dynasties as glorious has clashed with contemporary Chinese nationalism, which regard the territory as a Chinese borderland (bianjiang). Chinese historians even object to the name "Manchuria", which evokes a historical independence used to justify imperial powers' attempted separation of that territory from China. Accordingly, they believe that the proper name is "China's Northeast" (dongbei). The Goguryeo controversies around 2002 reflected nationalist sentiment in both China and Korea, stimulated by state-affiliated scholars and institutes from both sides which argued about whether Goguryeo should be considered part of Chinese or Korean history.

== See also ==
- Historiography of Korea
- Little China (ideology)
- Historical negationism
- Nihonjinron
- Korean history textbook controversies
- Chinese historiography
