= Historiography of Korea =

The historiography of Korea refers to the study and methods of compiling the history of Korea. This field has evolved over time, reflecting different periods and cultural contexts. During the Joseon period, historical narratives were influenced by the royal court, emphasizing a state-centric view. However, during the Korean independence movement and the Japanese colonial period, Korean historiography shifted towards a more realistic analysis and critical thinking. Modern Korean historiography seeks to provide a multi-dimensional understanding through independent perspectives, diverse theories, and methodologies, highlighting the distinctive characteristics and significance of Korean history.

== Goryeo dynasty ==
The historical and literary activities of the Goryeo Dynasty were diverse and active, primarily focused on the use of Chinese characters. These activities gradually shifted from a China-centric perspective to a more Korea-centric approach, conscious of the nation's independence. In history, Kim Bu-sik's Samguk sagi and Ilyeon's Samguk yusa are representative works, reflecting the changing times and growing national consciousness. During this period, most activities were still predominantly based on Chinese characters.

=== Historical outlook ===
First of all, it is noteworthy that the activities in the fields of history and literature during this era were much more diverse and active than in the previous era. These activities were made possible through a deeper understanding of Chinese characters. During this time, neither Idu (吏讀), which was found in Silla's Hyangga literature, nor Hangeul, introduced after the Joseon Dynasty, was commonly used as a means of expression. Almost all activities were dominated by the use of Chinese characters, which were the primary medium of the era. The overall characteristic of historical and literary thought in this period lies in the gradual shift from a Chinese-centered perspective to a Korean-centered one, as people became increasingly aware of national independence. This change inevitably occurred due to the development of Korean society and shifts in domestic circumstances.

In terms of historical writings, Goryeo began compiling the Sillok (實錄) from the early stages of the dynasty. In addition to this project, other historical books (史書) were frequently compiled and published. Among them, Kim Bu-sik's Samguk sagi (三國史記) (comprising 50 volumes), compiled in the 23rd year of King Injong (1145), is the longest of the Korean history books still in existence. However, Samguk sagi has been criticized for largely reflecting Kim Bu-sik's Sadaejuui (事大主義), a pro-Chinese ideology. Through many passages in the Samguk sagi, Korea's historical narrative remains China-centered, leading to criticism that it lacks sufficient national independence. However, rather than placing the blame entirely on Kim Bu-sik, it is important to understand the spirit of the times. Ideologically, the deep influence of Chinese culture and its way of thinking was prevalent throughout Korean society until then. The historical thought (史學思想) seen in Samguk sagi is a product of these circumstances.

As the times changed, so too did historical thought. A significant example of this can be seen in Ilyeon (一然)'s Samguk yusa (三國遺事), compiled during the reign of King Chungnyeol (1274–1308). By this time, the conditions had changed drastically. The Song (宋) Dynasty, founded by the Han (漢) people, had collapsed, and the Mongols, a northern people, had emerged as the dominant power, exerting considerable influence on the political and ideological landscape of the Goryeo Dynasty. At this point, a Korean-centered historical narrative began to emerge. The national consciousness to protect the Korean people in the face of Mongol military and political oppression was reflected in historical descriptions. For example, the Dangun myth (creation myth of Joseon) (檀君神話), which appears at the beginning of Samguk yusa, represents efforts to reclaim national independence.

This ideological trend can be generally observed in the history and literature of the late Goryeo Dynasty. For instance, the changing spirit of the times is reflected in Lee Seung-Hyu's (李承休) Jewang ungi (帝王韻紀) and Yi Kyubo's (李奎報) Dongmyeong Wangpyeon (東明王篇). Many other historical books, such as Pyeonnyeon Tongrok (編年通錄), Gogeumrok (古今錄), and Bonjo Pyeonnyeon Gangmok (本朝編年綱目), were also published during this period. However, it is unfortunate that these works are no longer extant, making it difficult to examine their specific historical thought.

== Joseon dynasty ==
The historical ideas of the early Joseon Dynasty are particularly evident in the approach to compiling history. In the national history books of this period, Chinese-centered thinking, inherited from the Goryeo Dynasty, was predominant. However, due to the growing recognition that "the people of Joseon are well-versed in Chinese history but lack knowledge of Korean history," there was a shift toward emphasizing national history. This led to the compilation of numerous national history books and an increase in history education during this time.

In contrast, during the late Joseon Dynasty, the focus on Korean historical consciousness became much more pronounced. However, this consciousness was still heavily influenced by Confucian ideas. The desire to break away from Confucian ideals led to the compilation of numerous historical works that aimed to represent Korea's autonomous and independent historical identity. This process resulted in a more systematic understanding of Korean history, and the historical ideas of the late Joseon Dynasty came to play a significant role in shaping Korean historical thought.

=== Historical outlook of the early period ===
The historical ideas of the early Joseon Dynasty are notably reflected in the approach to history editing. During this period, the focus of national history books remained largely Chinese-centered, following the precedent set by the Goryeo Dynasty. However, as awareness grew that "the people of Joseon are well-versed in Chinese history but lack knowledge of Korean history," there was a push towards emphasizing national history. This led to the compilation of many national historical texts and an increased focus on history education.

In contrast, by the late Joseon Dynasty, there was a much stronger emphasis on Korean historical consciousness. Despite this, most of this consciousness was still rooted in Confucian ideas. Efforts were made to move away from Confucian idealism, leading to the compilation of numerous historical works aimed at representing Korea's independent historical identity. This period saw a reorganization of Korean history and its system, resulting in a significant development of historical thought.

The influence of Chinese historical texts on the compilation of Korean national history was substantial. This is evident in the preface of Dongguk Tonggam, which reflects a strong interest in Chinese historiography. After the founding of the Joseon Dynasty, the compilation of historical records such as the Annals of the Dynasty and various historical texts, including Gwanchan and Sachan works like Goryeosa and Goryeosa Jeoryo, became prominent. King Sejo's efforts to highlight Korean history and correct historical narratives are well-documented, including Seo Geo-Jeong's references to Chinese texts like Jachi Tonggam and Tonggam Gangmok by Zhu Xi (朱憙). Seo Geo-Jeong's critiques emphasized that despite the long history of Joseon, there was a lack of a comprehensive history book, which motivated the creation of works like the Dongguk Tonggam to enlighten people about Korean history.

During the early Joseon Dynasty, the historical editing consciousness was strong, with an emphasis on moral instruction and the promotion of national ethos. This is reflected in the efforts to compile various historical texts and to enhance history education. For instance, Yang Seong-Ji's selection of important historical texts during King Sejo's reign underscored the commitment to both Korean and Chinese history. The focus on Korean history became even more pronounced after events like the Imjin War and the Qing invasion of Joseon, driven by the need to assert Korean identity in the face of external pressures.

=== Historical outlook of the late period ===
A series of advanced scholars in the late Joseon Dynasty grappled with various contradictions in political and social systems. While there were notable thinkers in earlier periods, their motivations were not as pronounced as those in the late Joseon era. Some of these scholars sought solutions while in government, while others pursued their ideas in rural settings. Nonetheless, any proposed ideas were constrained by Confucian ideology (儒敎理念), which remained the standard for resolving contradictions. From the 18th century onwards, as Western studies and new perceptions of Qing dynasty culture emerged, ideas began to deviate from Confucianism. However, most remained influenced by Confucian thought. Consequently, the pursuit of a new ideal state and society often began with a critique of reality based on Confucian ideals. This critique frequently sought rationality from a historical perspective.

Pre-modern history was autonomous, and its significance was apparent. This autonomy also characterized the historical consciousness of the late Joseon Dynasty. Reality often proved unsatisfactory, particularly for those aiming to achieve Gwangjeong (匡正) by confronting contradictions. Historical research, always critical of contemporary scientific methodology, begins with a critique of inherent facts. This critical approach was also evident in the late Joseon Dynasty. Scholars of this period were independent thinkers who attempted to resolve issues from an independent perspective, diverging from traditional attitudes. This approach led to a renewed perception of Joseon's history and geography.

In Korea, historical consciousness emerged prominently during the period of national awakening. Whether or not the concept of a nation was established, it arose during a time of strong self-recognition. This phenomenon can be observed in various historical periods, such as the mid-Goryeo period during northern invasions, the early Joseon period with the establishment of new systems, and the mid-Joseon period facing invasions from the north and south. Intellectuals before and after the 18th century, who struggled with realistic contradictions before and after the Enlightenment, also exhibited this consciousness. Historical consciousness thus characterizes the times, and historical books reflecting this consciousness emerged during the late Joseon Dynasty.

Notable historians who compiled significant historical works include Ahn Jung-bok (安鼎福), author of Dongsa Gangmok (東史綱目); Lee Geung-ik (李肯翊), author of Yeongnyeosil Gisul (燃藜室記述); and Han Chi-yoon (韓致奫), author of Haedong Yeoksa (海東繹史). Influential scholars who impacted their work included Lee Ik (李瀷), Lim Sang-Deok (林象德), Yoon Seong-sang (尹衡聖), Lee Deok-mu (李德懋), Cho Gyeong-nam (趙慶男), Yoo Deuk-gong (柳得恭), Hong Yang-ho (洪良浩), Hong Seok-ju (洪奭周), and Jeong Yak-yong (丁若鏞). Most of the so-called Positive School (實學派) of the late Joseon Dynasty were historical thinkers. They studied history not merely from autonomous perspectives but engaged actively with and critiqued reality. This active historicism aimed for an objective examination of history. For instance, Han Chi-yoon's Haedong Yeoksa, which aimed to project Korean history using Chinese or Japanese sources, was comparable to Ahn Jung-bok's Dongsa Gangmok, which established an independent Korean history system, and Lee Geung-ik's Yeongnyeosil Gisul. The value of history as a science was a common goal.

History is more than just a description of facts. Each historical work of the late Joseon Dynasty had unique characteristics. For example, Dongsa Gangmok was a comprehensive history of Gangmok (綱目), Yeongnyeosil Gisul was a concise history of the end of the article, and Haedong Yeoksa was a comprehensive history of Gijeon (紀傳). Additionally, Lim Sang-Deok's Dongsa Hoegang (東史會綱) and Yoon Seong-sang's Joya Cheomjae (朝野僉載) are considered Yasa (野史), and Yoo Deuk-gong established a personal view on the history of Balhae (渤海), founded by migrants from Goguryeo. Their approach to studying and compiling history sought to uncover true historical facts rather than merely acknowledging existing ones. This pursuit of due diligence or Gujin (求眞) is evident in the Goi-pyeon (考異篇) and Haedong Yeoksa in Dongsa Gangmok, as well as in the geographical evidence in Balhaego by Yoo Deuk-gong. Their spirit aimed to systematically understand and properly reorganize Korean history, laying the foundation for the longitudinal study of history and analysis of historical facts.

The innovative perspective on Korean history pioneered by these scholars is still relevant today. They approached historical research with a scientific and objective mindset. Their methods and attitudes were further developed by scholars such as Lee Geon-chang (李建昌), Park Eun-sik (朴殷植), Shin Chae-ho (申采浩), and Jang Ji-yeon (張志淵). Additionally, scholars such as Choi Nam-seon (崔南善), Lee Neung-hwa (李能和), and Jeong In-bo (鄭寅普) also belong to this group. Thus, historical thought in the late Joseon Dynasty remains significant both in its time and as a major component of Korean historical science.

== Modern era ==
From 1890 to 1920, there was a need for historical consciousness focused on the dismantling of the feudal social system and national independence. As a result, many Koreans made significant efforts to move away from traditional historical views. For example, Kim Taek-young (金澤榮), Hyunchae (玄采), and Jang Ji-yeon (張志淵) sought to reform historical thought through Silhak (practical learning). Park Eun-sik(朴殷植) and Sin Chae-ho addressed issues that Silhak could not resolve, thereby completing modern Korean history. This process established modern Korean history on ethnic principles. Additionally, from 1930 to 1940, Jeong In-bo, Choi Nam-sun, and Paek Nam-un sought to systematize Korean history by writing various historical works based on socioeconomic history.

=== Historical outlook of the early period ===
In the 19th century, the history of Korea had two basic characteristics. One was to break down the feudal social system that had already been dismantled in the internal development of Korean history and form a new modern society. The other was the question of how to maintain national independence in response to the imperialist and colonial advancement of Western capitalist powers or the Japanese colonial era.

Therefore, historical studies of this period needed a historical consciousness to provide insight into such historical reality and cope with it. Moreover, in the period from the 1890s to the 1910s, Korean history was studied and described by Japanese scholars as modern history, in that it was carried out by the Japanese invasion of the continent. In Japan, when research on Korean history was being conducted with such aggression, history in Korea had to seek a new dimension in terms of historical consciousness and methodology of historical research. In other words, modern Korean history also needed to break away from traditional historical views and objectively grasp the development of history.

This request showed a tendency to take into account new methodologies only through the Gwangmu(光武) reform period, and the history of this period was based on Silhak(實學) and emphasized traditional ideas and culture that should inherit and develop Silhak. In this way, in the 5th year of Gwangmu (1901), Kim Taek-young(金澤榮), Hyunchae(玄采), and Jang Ji-yeon(張志淵) published or expanded practical books. In 1905, Kim Taek-young compiled Yeoksa-Jipryak(歷史輯略), and Jang Ji-yeon was also preparing the history of Korean manners and customs.

As such, historians of the reform period conducted their research on a practical basis, and the results were shown in two trends: Tongsa(通史) and special research. As Tongsa, Hwang Hyun(黃玹)'s Maecheon Yarok(梅泉野錄), Jeong Gyeo(鄭喬)'s Daehan Gyenyeonsa(大韓季年史), and Kim Taek-young's biography Yeoksa-Jipryak are representative. These authors' historical consciousness was strong, so they agreed to the reform projects of this period and showed a national consciousness that strongly resisted imperialist aggression. However, their historical descriptions were still following tradition, and their historical consciousness did not reach modernity. This point was a limitation and a task that the historical studies of this period had to overcome.

These tasks gradually found clues to solutions through translation studies of history. From the standpoint of historical history, translation can be found in a series of translation activities. He performed Manguksagi(萬國史記) and published Dongguksarak(東國史略). These translation activities were based on the common view of the literate stratum at the time that they should know how to resist imperialism, and interest in methodologies for historical descriptions also developed.

It was a series of scholars called ethnic historians who succeeded in the history of the reform period and solved the problems that could not be solved at that time. Ethnic history was developed by Park Eun-sik(朴殷植) and Sin Chae-ho. Park Eun-sik developed Korean history into modern history by inheriting the history of the Gwangmu Reform period and introducing the methodology of modern history, which was in the 1910s, and Hanguk Tongsa(韓國痛史) and "Korean Independence Movement Jihyeolsa(韓國獨立運動之血史)" are his representative works. In these books, he analyzed, criticized, and synthesized the development process of historical facts in terms of causal relations, and revealed the Japanese invasion process in detail through the methodology of modern history. He considered the soul, or spirit, as the key to maintaining the state, and called it the history of the country where the soul of the nation or state is contained. He also said that a country with a strong soul could eventually become independent even if it was temporarily merged into the powers. He believed that the Korean people were strong-spirited and was confident that Korea would also be liberated in the future. It cannot be overlooked that Park Eun-sik's historical thought and history were consistent with national consciousness and national spirit, and it was also incorporated into the enterprising reform idea that the world's culture should be opened and consumed from an independent standpoint. At the same time, his historical ideas were deeply imbued with Confucian values. Therefore, his reform ideas contained limitations that were bound to be critiqued within the historical consciousness of modern Korean history in that regard.

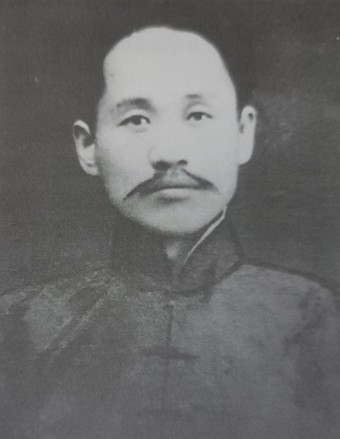
Shin Chae-ho, theoretically completed modern Korean history. And also started Korean historiographic Nationalism

It was Shin Chae-ho who inherited Park Eun-sik's history, overcame the limitations of his historical consciousness, and theoretically completed modern Korean history. His historical consciousness was thorough in the struggle against imperialism, and his ethnic consciousness was strong. His historical research was a struggle for independence in itself. It is a fact that, in the 1920s, Shin Chae-ho paid attention to history and completed modern Korean history, which is well illustrated in Joseon Sanggosa (朝鮮上古史) and other fragmentary research activities. He recognized the nature of history as a "struggle between Ah (我) and Via (非我)." Here, Ah or Via should have continuity in time, and its influence should spread socially. In addition, the struggle was such that if the spiritual sense of subjectivity for "Ah" was not established or if the environment of "Via" was not adapted to, it would result in defeat. In particular, the contradiction between "Ah" and "Via" within society is regarded as an opportunity for social development. His essential understanding of history was that he sought to develop history by grasping the causal relationship of historical facts in social phenomena, and he understood that such struggles and new cultures were created by identifying various egos of subjectivity and internally comprehending the various historical realities of each era through mutual contradictions. Shin Chae-ho's attitude toward recognizing history was in line with modern European historical thought.

Thus, from the standpoint of this historical awareness, Shin Chae-ho sought to reorganize Korean history. As part of these efforts, he criticized conventional historical books (史書) and emphasized the importance of the three major elements of history composition: time (時), earth (地), and human (人), which were often lacking in these historical texts. He also criticized these books for neglecting to thoroughly examine historical materials and failing to properly evaluate historical facts because they were based on the historical description methods of Confucius' Chunchu (春秋) or Gangmok (綱目) by Zhu Xi (朱子). Since the achievements of Korean history at that time were in such a condition, he argued that Korean history should be reorganized by critically assessing historical materials and improving the methods and perspectives of historical research and narratives.

A particularly important aspect of Shin Chae-ho's historical consciousness was his strong pride in the history and tradition of the Korean people, along with a civic modern consciousness that believed in and sought to achieve human freedom and social progress. He also emphasized the nation as the subject of history and placed the people at the forefront of historical events, which reflected his vivid modern consciousness. His perspective on Japan focused on the idea of overthrowing invaders by force and achieving the independence of the people. He described this as a revolution through violence. He also harshly criticized the two methods that had been employed thus far to build the Japanese Empire: the independence movement through diplomatic strategy and the theory of preparation. However, for him, independence did not simply mean the establishment of the Japanese Empire. His concept of independence also included the social goal of reforming the class contradictions and outdated social systems that had existed in Korean society until that time. Korea's modern history emerged from the contradictory relationships of internal social conflicts and struggles against Japan, and through this, civic awareness and solid nationalist ideals were formed.

=== Historical outlook of later period ===
Korean history was evolving into modern history through the works of Park Eun-sik (朴殷植) and Shin Chae-ho (申采浩). Their historical descriptions and consciousness during this period were significant achievements for Korean history, serving as a spiritual foundation for establishing modern Korean history. However, in the 1930s and 1940s, modern Korean history diversified. At this time, professionally trained historians emerged, displaying distinct historical perspectives in response to rapidly changing social ideologies. Alongside ethnic history, which had now developed into a new form of history rooted in orthodox traditions, socioeconomic history also emerged, attempting to systematize the entirety of history through a specific historical lens.

In the realm of ethnic history, Choi Nam-sun, who held a different position from Shin Chae-ho, lost a consistent historical spirit and reverted to encyclopedic knowledge reminiscent of the Silhak era. Choi Nam-sun's most notable contributions to Korean literary history are best represented in his thesis, Bulham Munhwaron (不咸文化論). Many historians contributed to the field of ethnic history, but Jeong In-bo (鄭寅普) played a pivotal role. His serious engagement with historical research began in the 1930s. Ahn Chai-hong (安在鴻), who authored Joseon SanggosaGam (朝鮮上古史鑑), and Mun Il-pyeong (文一平) also emerged around the same time as Jeong In-bo. Mun's Hoamjeonjip (湖岩全集) presents a new form of historical description, focusing on popularizing history and enlightening the public.

Son Jin-tae (孫晋泰) and Lee In-young (李仁榮) were active in the 1940s, carrying forward this academic tradition while attempting to challenge Japanese colonial historiography. Despite their academic achievements, few scholars subscribed to the school of national history. Nevertheless, their contributions in a short period were far from insignificant. They made significant strides in protecting the nation and promoting national spirit, establishing a historiographical framework opposed to Japanese colonial history, and laying a solid foundation for Korean history. Furthermore, their historical consciousness represented the highest level attainable during the Japanese occupation, and their historical narratives also displayed the scientific rigor of modern historiography. The level of historical narrative and consciousness reached by these ethnic historians by the 1940s was profound, and their approach to historical research remains a benchmark. They connected Korean history to world history, making efforts to study various stages of world historical development and applying those findings to Korean history.

Among their achievements was the application of the theory of social development to the systematization of Korean history. In essence, they sought to establish the subjecthood of Korean history, conscious of the balance between universality and individuality in relation to world history. Ethnic history is sometimes criticized as unscientific or simplistic, but this evaluation overlooks its core contributions, focusing instead on certain limitations. It is true that Japanese colonial historiography failed to scientifically overcome the political theories used to justify colonial policies, as well as the positivist historical evidence surrounding the Korean War and colonial history.

When discussing positivism during the Japanese colonial period, the Jin-dan Academy (震檀學會) often comes to mind, and for good reason. The Jin-dan Academy, established in 1934, represents the nature of positivism in its relationship with socioeconomic and national history. Socioeconomic historians viewed the Jin-dan Academy as an organization conducting academic activities in the manner of pure history. They criticized positivism for being a research group without a historical perspective. Although the Jin-dan Academy did not actively engage with socioeconomic historians, it tolerated such criticism. Despite this, tensions remained high between the two groups.

Next is the relationship with ethnic history. Jeong In-bo was dissatisfied with Japanese scholars, as he sought to uncover national historical truths omitted from the existing literature. Positivist historians, however, were equally unsatisfied with national historians and did not value their academic contributions. As seen in the relationship between positivism and national or socioeconomic history, positivism was not entrenched in older generations but deliberately distanced itself. Positivists attempted to understand general historical trends through specific studies, but they were criticized for lacking a cohesive view of history. Their work remained at the level of documenting individual facts without developing into a comprehensive understanding of Korean or world history.

Positivism rejected the idea that applying predetermined formulas or laws constituted a scientific method for historical research. Positivists argued that general laws of history could not be derived solely from examining all ethnic histories globally, but rather that general principles could be distilled from individual or ethnic histories. However, it is mistaken to believe that empirical research is unique to positivism or that it alone defines the foundation of historical generalization. Positivism is not history itself, but empirical historians showed little inclination to reflect on the general significance of individual facts. As a result, the unresolved issues within positivism led to confusion in modern Korean historiography.

Socioeconomic history also advanced during this period. Though called socioeconomic history, not all historians within the field shared the same approach. From the late 1920s to the 1930s, the rise of socialism and labor movements, in response to heightened colonial exploitation and economic depression, influenced the field. A defining feature of socioeconomic history was its systematic approach to studying the entire socioeconomic system, distinct from research focused on individual historical facts. Paek Nam-un (白南雲), a leading historian of this school, laid the foundation for historical materialism in Korea. He introduced the concept of historical materialism and analyzed the feudalistic aspects of the Korean peninsula.

Paek Nam-un's representative works are The History of Joseon Socio-Economy (1933) and The History of Joseon Feudal Socio-Economy·Volume I (1937). He had originally planned to complete a comprehensive history of Korean socio-economy. In his criticism of modern history, Paek rejected both nationalist views and those of Japanese historians. He viewed history as distinct from external specificity and the monistic law of history, and believed that the basis of historical development lay in the monistic law. He argued that only from this perspective could a proactive solution be found that avoided despair, despite the difficult circumstances under Japanese colonial rule. The monistic law of historical development, which he accepted as an alternative to colonial and nationalist views—what he termed the "special view"—was based on the principles of materialism.

Although he was criticized for applying this formula directly to Korean history, Paek was praised for attempting to systematize Korean history in the context of world historical development. However, questions arose regarding his interpretation of the law of development in world history. Paek argued that the development of world history was based on the European historical trajectory, as evidenced in his treatment of the "Asiatic mode of production." This issue emerged in his analysis of Asian empires, which he viewed as following a different path from Western societies. He applied this interpretation to Korean history, suggesting that Korea's feudal society had its own specificities—what he referred to as "Asian specificity." This approach was seen as a direct contradiction of his earlier adherence to a unitary law of development. It became evident that his historical framework was not inductively derived from specific research but was rather a one-sided application of this law.

Thus, the law of world history should be reconsidered from a different perspective. It is important to recognize that history is not governed by a single rule, but rather by pluralistic laws that must be interpreted with both universality and specificity in mind. Furthermore, specificity should be understood through the lens of a people's particular historical experiences. A nuanced understanding of these experiences forms the comprehensive foundation of a people's historical consciousness, leading to a more complete and diverse understanding of history.

== See also ==
- History of Korea
- Historiography
- Korean nationalist historiography
