= Jizi =

Semi-legendary ruler of Kija Chosŏn

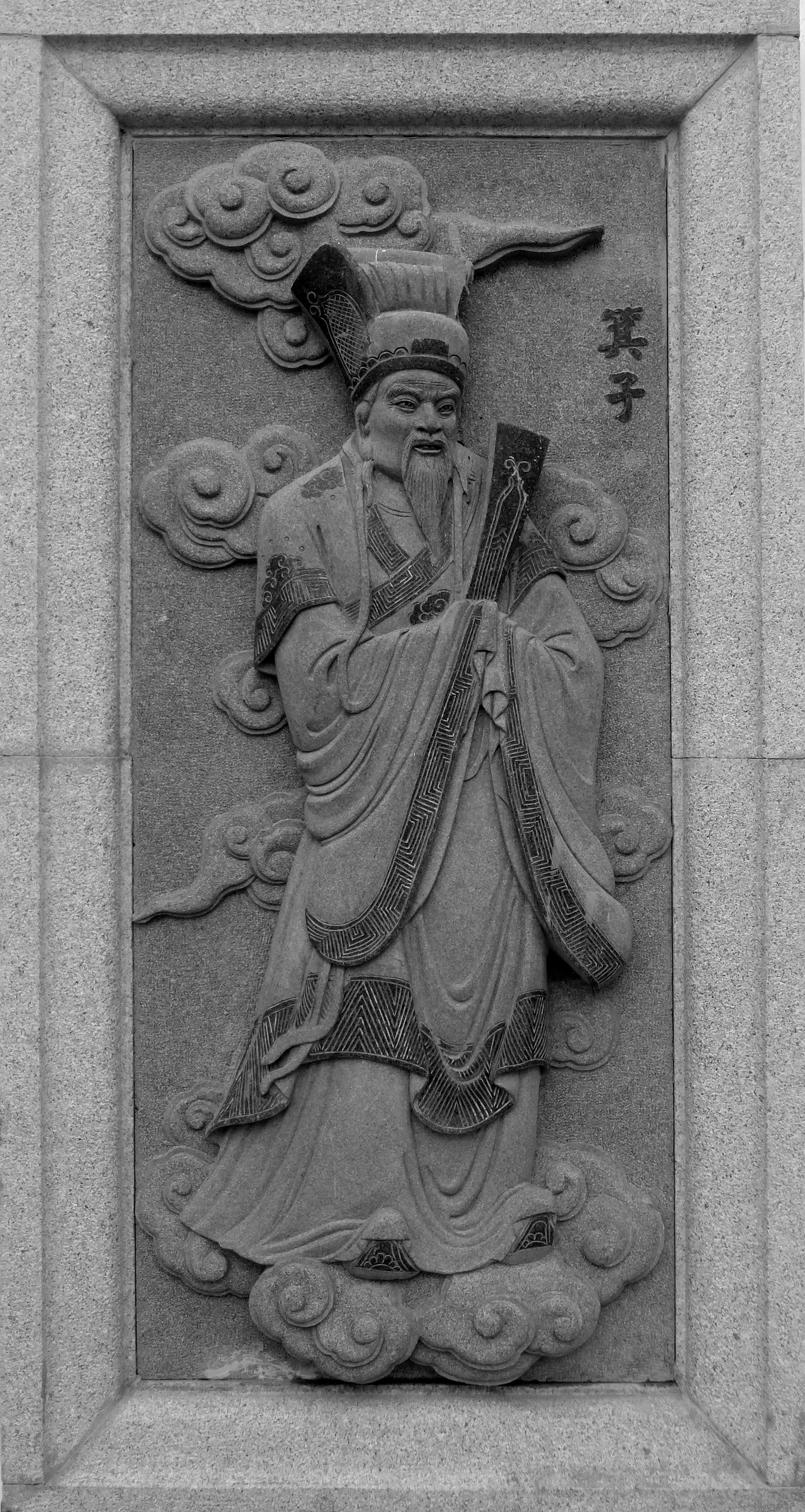
- A sculpture depicting a modern interpretation of Jizi in Perak, Malaysia

Chinese name
- Traditional Chinese: 箕子
- Simplified Chinese: 箕子
Transcriptions
Standard Mandarin
- Hanyu Pinyin: Jīzǐ
- Wade–Giles: Chi-tzu

Korean name
- Hangul: 기자
- Hanja: 箕子
Transcriptions
- Revised Romanization: Kija
- McCune–Reischauer: Kija

Jizi, Qizi, or Kizi (Chinese: 箕子; Wade–Giles: Chi-tzu) (Note: The character "zi" in "Jizi" does not mean a rank of nobility. It was Shang dynasty tradition that royal family members were called by the combination of the place at which they were enfeoffed and the suffix "zi." (Chen 2003, pp. 92–93)), called in Korean Kija (Korean: 기자; RR: Gija), was a semi-legendary Chinese sage who is said to have ruled Kija Chosŏn in the 11th century BCE. Early Chinese documents like the Book of Documents and the Bamboo Annals described him as a virtuous relative of the last king of the Shang dynasty who was punished for remonstrating with the king. After Shang was overthrown by Zhou in the 1040s BCE, he allegedly gave political advice to King Wu, the first Zhou king. Chinese texts from the Han dynasty (206 BCE – 220 CE) onwards claimed that King Wu enfeoffed Jizi as ruler of Chaoxian (朝鮮, pronounced "Chosŏn" in Korean). According to the Book of Han (1st century CE), Jizi brought agriculture, sericulture, and many other facets of Chinese civilization to Chosŏn. His family name was Zi/Ja (子) and given name was Xuyu/Suyu (胥餘; xūyú/ 胥餘, 서여 seoyeo, or 須臾; xūyú/須臾, 수유 suyu).

Kija (the Korean pronunciation of "Jizi") may have been the object of a state cult in sixth-century Goguryeo, and a mausoleum to him was established in Goryeo in 1102, but the first extant Korean text to mention Kija was the Samguk sagi (1145). Starting in the late thirteenth century, Kija was fully integrated into Korean history, being described as a successor to the descendants of Tan'gun in the state of Old Chosŏn. Following the spread of Neo-Confucianism in Korea in the fourteenth century, scholars of the Chosŏn period (est. 1392) promoted Kija as a culture hero alongside Tan'gun, with Kwŏn Kŭn's preface of Sambong chip writing,

『爰自箕子八條之敎。俗尙廉恥。文物之懿。人材之作。侔擬中夏。』

[Ever since the teaching of Kija's Eight Prohibitions, our customs have esteemed integrity and a sense of shame; the excellence of our culture and institutions and the emergence of talented people have been comparable to those of the Central States (China).]

However, with the development of radiocarbon dating and newly found excavations, modern Korean historians started to question the legitimacy of his enfeoffment as ruler of Old Chosŏn. Sin Ch'aeho (1880–1936) was the first to question the extent of Kija's cultural contributions and many followed as Kija's historical claims did not align with archeological evidence found during the time of his supposed rule. Additionally, post-war Korean scholars in both North and South Korea have strongly criticized the story of Kija's migration to Korea in the eleventh century BCE, claiming that his involvement in the history of Korea was widely exaggerated.

In recent times, both North and South Korea, and their respective historians do not officially recognize Jizi and his supposed accomplishments.

== In ancient Chinese texts ==
=== Pre-Qin sources ===
The earliest known mention of Jizi is in the "Mingyi" 明夷 hexagram of the Book of Change. According to other ancient Chinese texts like the Book of Documents, the Analects, and the Bamboo Annals, Jizi was a relative of Di Xin, the last ruler of the Shang dynasty, and one of the three wise men of Shang, along with Weizi (微子) and Bi Gan. Many identify him as Grand Tutor of the king. Jizi was either imprisoned or enslaved for remonstrating against King Zhou's misrule. (One later version states that he pretended to be mad after Bigan had been killed by King Zhou.) After Shang was overthrown by the Zhou dynasty in the mid eleventh century BCE, Jizi was released by King Wu, to whom he gave advice on how to rule the new polity. Despite his victory, King Wu did not know why the Shang state fell, and upon asking Jizi why two years later, he was too uncomfortable to say. The Bamboo Annals records Jizi attending King Wu's court during the 16th year of his reign, not long before his death.

These texts mention neither Chosŏn nor Jizi's descendants; they simply describe Jizi as a virtuous man who was trusted by King Wu of Zhou after having been mistreated by the last Shang king.

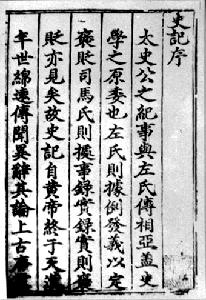
Sima Qian's Records of the Grand Historian (Shiji; ca 100 BCE) was one of the earliest works to claim that Jizi was enfeoffed by King Wu of Zhou as ruler of Chaoxian (= Chosŏn).

=== Han and later texts ===
The first texts that make an explicit connection between Jizi and Chosŏn date from the second century BCE, under the Han dynasty. The earliest known source stating that Jizi went to Chosŏn is the Shangshu dazhuan (尙書大傳), a commentary on the Book of Documents attributed to Fu Sheng of the second century BCE. In that account, King Wu enfeoffed Jizi as the ruler of Chosŏn and Jizi became the subject of King Wu. In a similar story recorded in Sima Qian's Records of the Grand Historian (or Shiji, compiled between 109 and 91 BCE), Jizi was enfeoffed by King Wu but did not become his subject. Sima Qian did not mention Jizi in his section on contemporary Chosŏn (i.e. northwestern Korea), where Wei Man's kingdom had flourished since about 194 BCE until it was conquered by the Han dynasty in 108 BCE. Thus the location of Chosŏn as in these earlier sources is not clear. Among other Han dynasty sources, the Han shi waizhuan mentions to Jizi but not his migration to Chosŏn.

The "Monograph on Geography" (Dili zhi 地理志) of the Book of Han (1st century CE) claims that Jizi had taught the people of Chosŏn agriculture, sericulture, and weaving, as well as proper ceremony. Jae-hoon Shim interprets the following sentence in that section of the Hanshu as claiming that Jizi also introduced the law of "Eight Prohibitions" (犯禁八條) in Chosŏn. The Records of Three Kingdoms (first published in the early fifth century) claims that the descendants of Jizi reigned as kings of Chosŏn for forty generations until they were overthrown by Wei Man, a man from the state of Yan, in 194 BCE.

According to his commentary to the Shiji, Du Yu (first half of the 3rd century) states that the tomb of Jizi was located in Meng Prefecture of the State of Liang (modern-day Henan). This suggests that the story of Jizi's association with Chosŏn was not necessarily prevailing although the narrative seen in the Hanshu later became common.

As historian Jae-hoon Shim concludes, only during the Han dynasty (206 BCE – 220 CE) did Jizi begin to be associated with Chosŏn, and only after the Han were his descendants identified as the Chosŏn royal family.

=== Possible Oracle Bone mentions ===
Oracle bones excavated in Yin during the 20th century led to significant development in interpretations of traditional Chinese historiography. Li Xueqin speculates that a ruler of the Qifang during the Late Shang period could be identified with Jizi on palaeographical grounds, but this has been disputed, chiefly on the basis of zi (子) being interpreted as a name, not a title.

== Interpretations ==
=== Ancient Korean accounts ===
The first extant Korean text to mention Kija (the Korean pronunciation of Jizi) was Kim Pusik's Samguk sagi (completed in 1145), which claimed that Kija had been enfeoffed in Haedong (海東: Korea) by the Zhou court, but commented that this account was uncertain because of the brevity of the sources. Only in the thirteenth century did Korean texts start to integrate Kija more fully into Korean history. The Samguk yusa (1281) explained that after being enfeoffed by King Wu of Zhou, Kija replaced Tan'gun's descendants as the ruler of Chosŏn, whereas Jewang Ungi (1287) identified Tan'gun and Kija as the first rulers of former and latter Chosŏn respectively. Most premodern Korean historians after that accepted that Kija had replaced another indigenous power (represented by Tan'gun) in Old Chosŏn.

In 1102, during the Goryeo period, King Sukjong built a mausoleum to Kija in a place near Pyongyang that had been identified as Kija's tomb.Sadang for Kija called Kijasa (箕子祠) was also built in Pyongyang. The mausoleum was rebuilt in 1324 and was repaired in 1355, but the cult of Kija spread most widely after the establishment of the Chosŏn Dynasty in 1392. Because Chosŏn's state ideology was Neo-Confucianism borrowed from China, Chosŏn intellectuals promoted Kija as a culture hero who had raised Korean civilization to the same level as China.

From the second half of the sixteenth century to the eighteenth century, Chosŏn scholars published a number of books on Kija. In 1580, Yun Tusu collated all available material on him and published his research as the Kijaji (箕子志; "Record of Kija"). On the same year, eminent scholar Yi I used Yun's book to compile the Kija Silgi (箕子實記), or True Account of Kija. Yi praised Kija for introducing agriculture, sericulture, decorum, the well-field system, and the Eight Prohibitions. Though he emphasized Kija's independence from King Wu of Zhou, Yi believed that Kija's teachings helped Korea to reach the same level of civilization as China. The cult of Kija also continued as temples which worshiped Kija portraits called Kijayeongjeon (箕子影殿), were built in the 18th century in South Pyongan Province.

Although Korean scholars became more critical of Kija's role in the eighteenth and nineteenth centuries, this account of Kija as the "bearer of civilization from China" became widely accepted, so much that by the late Chosŏn, the worship of Kija "had become an integral part of Korean cultural identity." Some Korean clans claim to be direct descendants of Kija himself.

=== Twentieth century accounts ===
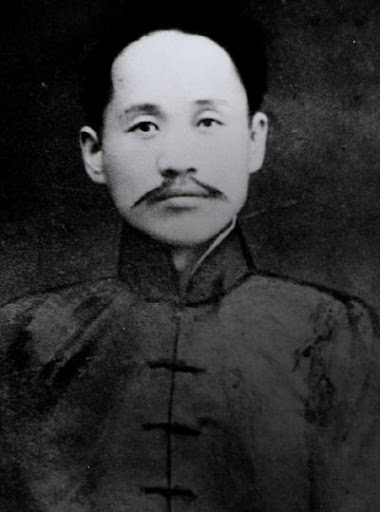
Sin Ch'aeho (1880–1936) was the first historian to question Kija's role in ancient Korea according to his New Reading of History (1908).

In the beginning of the twentieth century, Korean historians started to doubt the authenticity of his supposed influence. Sin Ch'aeho (1880–1936), a Korean independence nationalistic activist historian during the Japanese occupation, was the first to question the extent of Kija's contributions. In an essay titled Doksa Sillon ("New Reading of History"; 1908), he argued that Korean history was revolved around Tan'gun, the legendary founder of the state of Old Chosŏn. Sin dismissed Kija's contributions due to his foreign origin. Sin also argued that Kija had become a vassal of the kings of Buyeo and was only given control of a small territory.

Other historians such as Choe Nam-seon (1890–1957) and Lee Byeong-do (1896–1989) started to notice discrepancies between pre-Qin Chinese records of Jizi/Kija, and later accounts (both Chinese and Korean) of his role in Chosŏn. In 1973, archeologist Kim Cheong-bae (金貞培) denied Chinese influence on Korea because no ancient Chinese bronzes had been found on the peninsula.

In addition, Ri Chirin, a leading North Korean historian of ancient Korea, argued that the Kija legend had been forged in Han times when the Chinese started to occupy part of Chosŏn. Most North Korean scholars have followed Ri in doubting the authenticity of Kija's migration to Chosŏn.

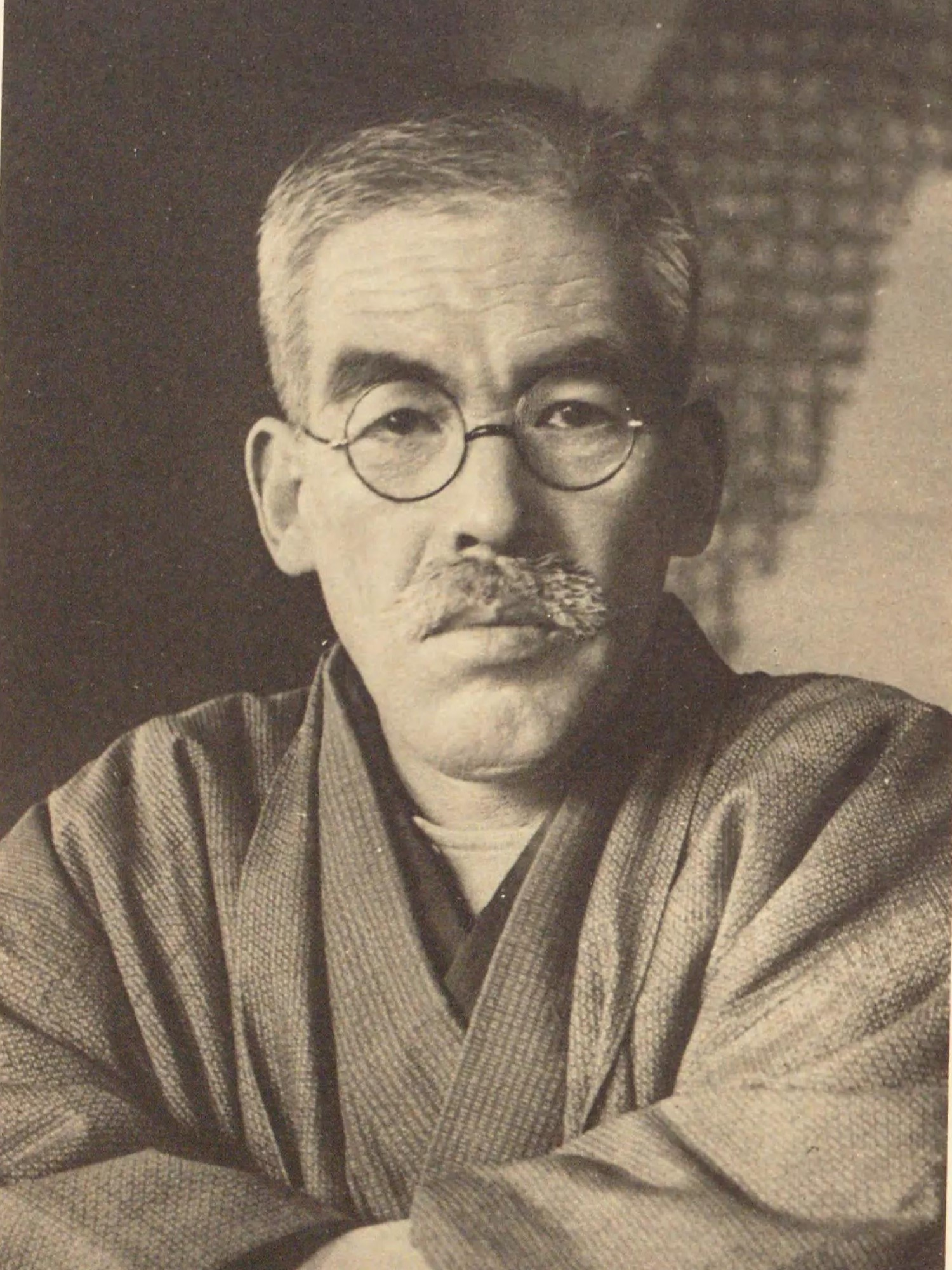
Ryū Imanishi (1875–1932), author of the Kishichōsen Densetsu Kō who also questioned the existence of Kija Chosŏn.

20th century Japanese historian and anthropologist, Ryū Imanishi (今西 龍), also stated that Kija Chosŏn was a fabrication created by the Cheongju Han Clan (alleged descendants of Jizi/Kija) of the Lelang Commandery in order to elevate their social status to that of royalty in his 1922 book, Kishichōsen Densetsu Kō (箕子朝鮮伝説考; Analysis of the legend of Kija Chosŏn). Imanishi asserted that Koreans and Jizi had no direct relations outside of unverifiable claims, and that they were not to be taken literally.

Imanishi, who is known to be the pioneer of discovering much of the remains of the Lelang Commandery in Pyongyang, emphasized in his book that though the remnants of Chinese influence (specifically Han dynasty) is clear especially in the northern regions of the peninsula, the likelihood of Kija Chosŏn's existence is improbable as actual evidence of Jizi's Shang dynasty relics are nowhere to be seen.

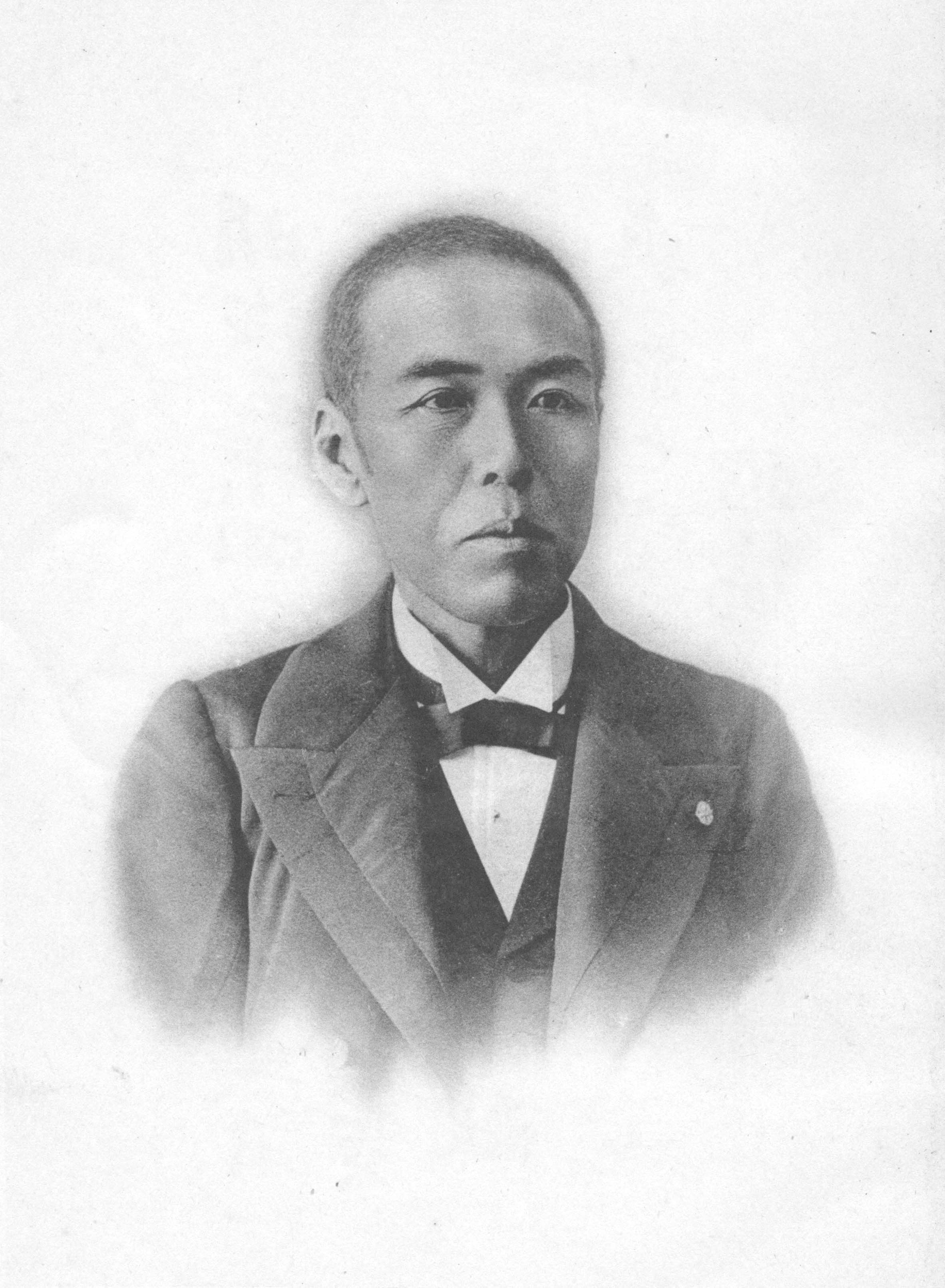
Michiyo Naka, creator of the Chōsen Koshi Kō who also rejected the existence of Kija Chosŏn alongside Tan'gun's founding myth (1851–1908)

Another 20th century Japanese historian named Naka Michiyo (那珂 通世) made a more assertive analysis, considering the stories found in the Samguk yusa to be fabricated myths made by Buddhist traditions in his Korea's Ancient History Analysis (朝鮮古史考). He discredited both founding legends of Tan'gun and Kija (Jizi) as mere "fiction (虛構)".

Different from Imanishi, who took a more archaeological approach to discerning the historicity of Kija Chosŏn, Michiyo's analysis was based on the religious climate in Goryeo dynasty when the Samguk yusa was created, criticizing the authenticity based on the dominance of Buddhism and emphasis on legends rather than historicity at the time. His conclusion was that the founding myths of ancient Korea were either highly aggrandized or were likely fabricated by foreign influence (such as Buddhism or Sinicization).

=== Modern Korean accounts ===
Modern Korean scholars also deny the existence of Kija's involvement in Kija Chosŏn for various reasons. The main reason comes from the fact that Kija Chosŏn's first introduction stems from a Chinese book called Shangshu dazhuan (尙書大傳), an interpretive work on the Book of Documents written much later by an unknown author and date of publication. Another Chinese book, the Records of the Three Kingdoms, also parrots the existence of the Kija dynasty of Chosŏn by proclaiming that Wiman overthrew King Chun, a descendant of Jizi/Kija, when he entered Korea. However, due to the nature of the books being of Chinese origin, and having no historical documents in Korea that supports the existence of Kija Chosŏn, Korean historians consider these claims as an attempt of Sinicization and do not recognize his existence, at least within the history of Korea.

Others also point to the Bamboo Annals and the Confucian Analects, which were among the first works to mention Kija, but do not mention his migration to Old Chosŏn. However, some Kija enthusiasts suggest that Kija Chosŏn may have coexisted with Tan'gun, and that Kija Chosŏn was established at the western end of Old Chosŏn. This claim is also mostly denied by modern Korean historians due to lack of archaeological evidence.

In addition, detractors of the Kija Chosŏn theory also point out that the cultural artifacts found in the region do not appear to have Chinese origins. An example of such an artifact is found in a Old Chosŏn mandolin-shaped bronze dagger. Its shape and bronze composition are different from similar artifacts found in China being described as "The detachable handle is a key feature for distinguishing Liaoning daggers from other Chinese daggers, which were typically produced in one piece."

Currently, Korean historians (from both nations) reject the previously held belief of Kija's involvement in Korea and thus many high school textbooks applied these recent studies reevaluating Kija and his influence with him now only being mentioned in a foot note. Additionally, the 7th edition of the Korean textbooks do not mention Jizi/Kija. The general consensus is that Old Chosŏn only consisted of two dynasties; one stemming from the ancient indigenous Yemaek people, and the other after Wiman naturalized and overthrew the original dynasty and became ruler which lasted until the Han dynasty subjugated it and formed the Four Commanderies of Han.

== See also ==
- Cheongju Han clan
- Haengju Ki clan
- Taewon Sunwoo clan
- Icheon Seo clan

== Notes ==
Jizi House of Gojoseon
Regnal titles
Unknown Last known title holder: Dangun	King of Gojoseon c. 1126 BC – c. 1082 BC	Unknown
