= Taein Gyeong clan =

Korean clan from North Jeolla Province

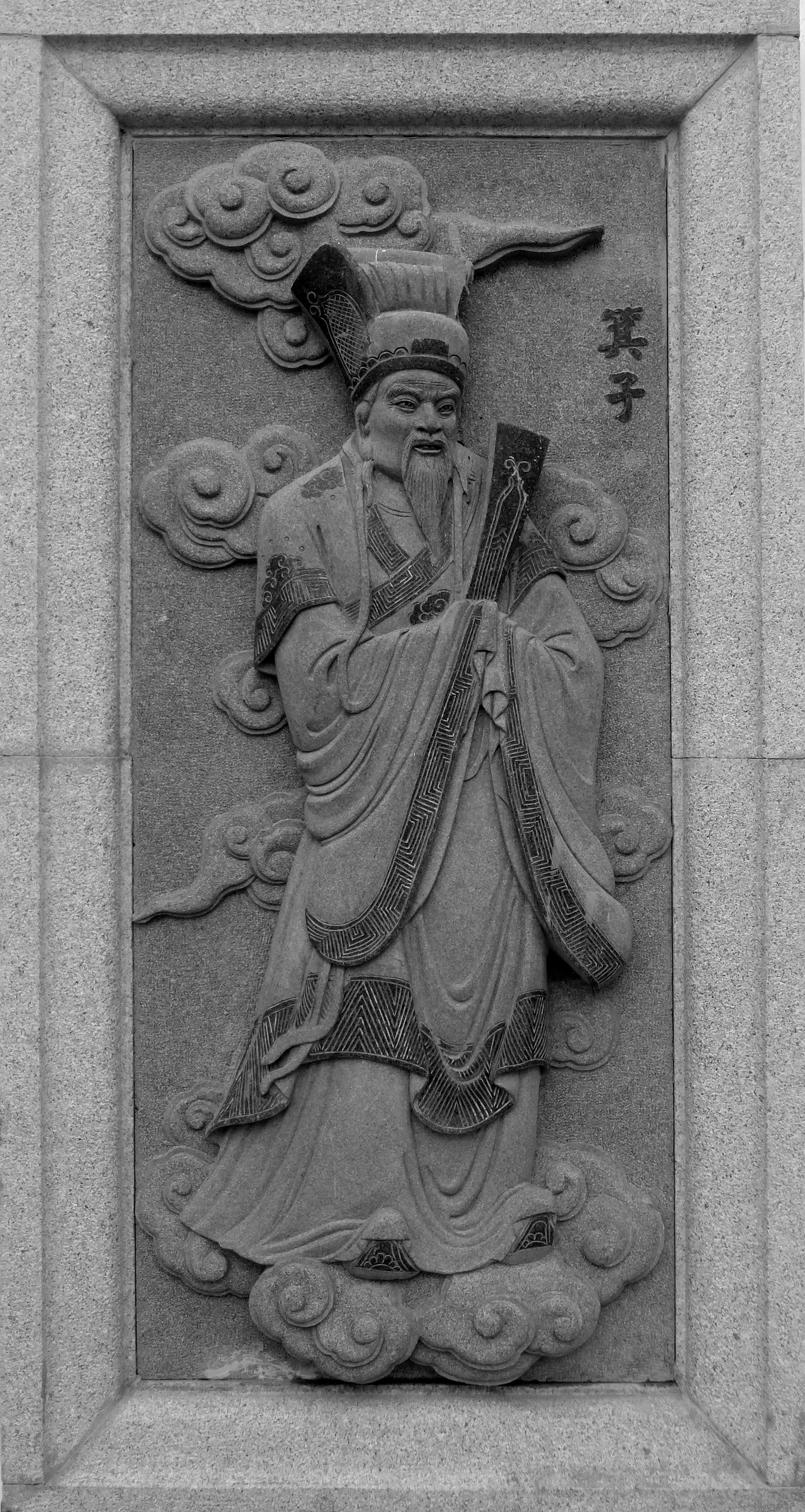
- The legendary sage, Gija
- Country: Korea
- Current region: Jeongeup
- Founder: Gyeong Yeo song
- Connected members: Kyung Soo-jin; Kyung Sung-hwan

Taein Gyeong clan (Korean: 태인 경씨; Hanja: 泰仁 景氏) is a Korean clan. Their Bon-gwan is in Jeongeup, North Jeolla Province. There are 3603 members of this clan. Their founder was Gyeong Yeo song, an aristocrat in the Shang dynasty. When Gyeong Yeo song unified Korea and founded Gija Joseon with Gija, he taught etiquette, agriculture, rice farming, sericulture, weaving and government systems to Koreans.

== See also ==
- Korean clan names of foreign origin
