= Ki-baik Lee =

South Korean historian (1924–2004)

- Hangul: 이기백
- Hanja: 李基白
- RR: I Gibaek
- MR: I Kibaek

Ki-baik Lee (Korean: 이기백; 1924–2004) was a Korean historian. He was born in Jeongju-gun, in North Pyeongan province in what is today North Korea. He graduated from the Osan School in 1941, attending Waseda University in Tokyo but ultimately graduating from Seoul National University in 1947.

Lee was a notable historian. He served as professor of history at Sogang University, Seoul. His most noted work was the New History of Korea (Kuksa Sillon, to echo Shin Chaeho's 1908 Doksa Sillon), first published in 1967 and revised thereafter. New History of Korea was published in English in translation by Edward W. Wagner. Lee was given the Inchon Award in 1990.

== Publications ==
- 한국사신론(韓國史新論) ISBN 9788933700501
- A New History of Korea (English translation)

== See also ==
- History of Korea
