= Kija's Tomb =

Lost Korean historical site

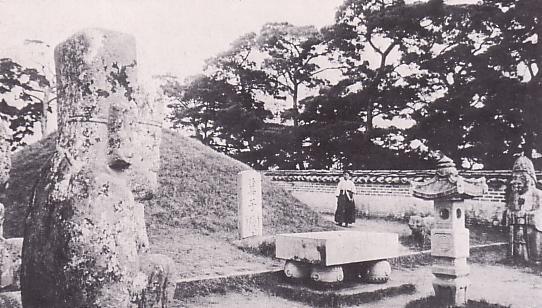

Korean name
- Hangul: 기자릉
- Hanja: 箕子陵
- RR: Gijareung
- MR: Kijarŭng

Jizi (Kija) allegedly fled the Chinese Shang dynasty to the Korean Peninsula, where he founded the dynastic state of Kija Chosŏn and eventually succeeded Dangun as king of Gojoseon. Legend says that Kija brought to the Korean people many skills from China, such as agriculture and weaving; he is also credited with founding the city of Pyongyang.

The site of Kija's burial mound was identified during the Goryeo dynasty by King Sukjong, who constructed the first mausoleum at the 1102. A memorial temple was later added and the mausoleum was enlarged and repaired in 1324 and again in 1355.

In 1570, King Seonjo of the Joseon dynasty erected a monument at the site requiring all people riding past to dismount out of respect. When Korea was under Japanese rule, the site was heavily promoted as a tourist venue by the Japanese, who tempered Korean ethnic nationalism by pointing out that the first "Korean" kingdom was founded by a foreigner.

However, the North Korean government denies Kija's existence as a fabrication of the Chinese Han dynasty historians as a propaganda to justify its rule over the Korean Peninsula, and has neglected and defaced the tomb. The tomb was allegedly excavated in the 1960s, which in turn yielded nothing but broken bricks and pottery. The current state of the tomb is unknown, though it is believed to have been destroyed shortly after its excavation. The site was purposefully excluded from the list of National Treasures of North Korea.

Despite this, it is believed the true tomb of Kija is located in China, in the Cao County.

== See also ==
- Tomb of King Tangun
- Tomb of King Tongmyong
- National Treasures of North Korea
