= Chin-Tan Hakpo =

South Korean academic journal

- Discipline: Korean studies
- Language: Korean

Publication details
- History: 1934–present
- Publisher: Chin-Tan Society (South Korea)
- Frequency: Biannually

Standard abbreviations
- ISO 4: Chin-Tan Hakpo

Indexing
- ISSN: 1013-4719

Links
- Journal homepage

The Chin-Tan Hakpo (Korean: 진단학보; Hanja: 震檀學報) is a biannual academic journal that covers Korean history. It was established in 1934 as the journal of the Chin-Tan Society, a society of Korean historians. It was the first Korean-language academic journal on Korean history. It provided a space for Korean scholars during the colonial period to publish their work in a Korean-language journal. Yi Pyong-do, a founder of the Chin-Tan Society, argued that Korea should be studied by Koreans, rather than just colonial Japanese scholars. In 1941, publishing was stopped by the Japanese colonial authorities on the basis on war-time paper shortages during World War II. Publishing was restarted after independence but stopped due to the outbreak of the Korean War. Publishing would restart in June 1955, after the end of the Korean War, with the issue of the 17th volume of the Chin-Tan Hakpo.

The journal is indexed in the Korea Citation Index.

== See also ==
- Yi Pyong-do
