= Shiratori Kurakichi =

Japanese historian and sinologist (1865–1942)

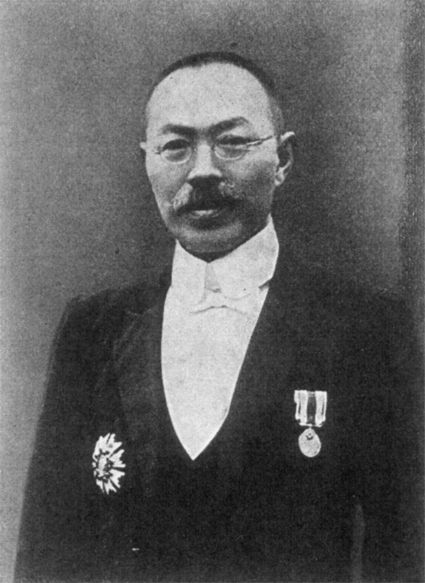
- Born: March 1, 1865; Mobara, Chiba, Japan
- Died: March 30, 1942 (aged 77); Chigasaki, Kanagawa, Japan
- Other name: 白鳥 倉吉

Shiratori Kurakichi (白鳥 庫吉, March 1, 1865 – March 30, 1942) was a Japanese historian and Sinologist who was one of the pioneers of the field of "Oriental History".

== Biography ==
Shiratori graduated from Tokyo Imperial University and joined the staff of Gakushūin University in 1890. He later returned to Tokyo Imperial University where he became a professor. Kurakichi had, at one time, studied under Ludwig Riess, who was himself a former student of Leopold von Ranke. In 1905, he founded the Asia Research Society (亜細亜学会 Ajia Gakkai).

== Writings ==
=== Japanese history ===
Beginning in 1910, Kurakichi was one of several historians who argued that the previously high value placed on female state and military leaders in Japanese history should be reduced as all of them, such as Himiko and ancient Japanese empresses, were, in Kurakichi's estimation, merely religious leaders concerned with performing rites and not leaders with actual administrative power.

=== East Asian history ===
In addition to domestic Japanese history, Kurakichi has also been identified as a leading pioneer of "oriental history" (東洋史 Tōyōshi) studies in Japan by focusing on the unique history of East Asia and Japan's place in it, such that Kurakichi and like-minded historians could "create a realm that would allow the assertion of an identity at once distinct from and equal to the West." The writer Stefan Tanaka has argued that this process involved removing the traditional stress on Chinese civilization as the centre of East Asians' understanding of their own history, and instead treating seminal Chinese icons such as Confucius as representatives of "East Asian" history more broadly. This would allow, for instance, equality between Confucian China and Confucian Japan as two parts of a shared oriental history, and so on. Furthermore, this would also allow modern East Asian history to be framed in such a way as to have Japan as the leading nation instead of China, as had been common in the past, and, by 1918, he had argued that it would be best for China to be administered by Japan. This framework would allow Japan to be seen as a culturally superior nation and thus on par with the great European powers of the day. Moreover, Kurakichi, like most Japanese nationalists of his day, equated the people with the state and believed that history should be used to bolster the state.

Kurakichi's interests stretched to include much of Asian beyond only China. Kurakichi has been identified as a pioneering Koreanist, and had been studying the historical linguistics of the Korean language and supported the Altaic hypothesis as early as 1905. He was also interested in Manchurian regional history as early as 1913, and argued for the view of Korea and Manchuria as being historically interconnected and inseparable. He wrote on the topic of the ancient Balhae state and noted the presence of both Chinese and non-Chinese sounding names in records of Balhae emissaries, interpreting this as a marker of ethnic diversity between Goguryeo Koreanic and Mohe individuals respectively.

Kurakichi had argued that the Liugui land described in ancient Chinese records was Sakhalin and that it was inhabited by Ainu people.

== Relatives ==
- Nephew:Toshio Shiratori(白鳥 敏夫) was the Japanese ambassador to Italy from 1938 to 1940, adviser to the Japanese foreign minister in 1940, and one of the 14 Class-A war criminals enshrined at Yasukuni Shrine.
