= Korean History Compilation Committee =

1925–1945 colonial historical society

Korean name
- Hangul: 조선사 편수회
- Hanja: 朝鮮史編修會
Transcriptions
- Revised Romanization: Joseonsa Pyeonsuhoe
- McCune–Reischauer: Chosŏnsa P'yŏnsuhoe

Japanese name
- Hiragana: ちょうせんしへんしゅうかい
- Kyūjitai: 朝鮮史編修會
- Shinjitai: 朝鮮史編修会
Transcriptions
- Romanization: Chōsenshi Henshūkai

The Korean History Compilation Committee (Korean: 조선사 편수회; Hanja: 朝鮮史編修會) was established in June 1925 by the Japanese government. It is also known as Korean History Compilation Society, Association of the Compilation of Korean History, Korean History Compilation Bureau or Society of Compiling Korean History.

According to Article 1 of the Regulation of Korean History Compilation Committee (朝鮮史編修会官制, 1925), "Korean History Compilation Committee was administered by the Governor General of Korea and engaged in collecting of Korean historical materials and compilation of Korean history".

A total of 975,534 yen (not adjusted for inflation) was spent, and a considerable number of books were published. The books can be categorized into Joseon History (25 volumes), History Collection (102 volumes), and Reprint of Historical Records (1623 volumes). However, no copies of the Reprint of Historical Records are known to exist today.

== Organization ==
=== Chairman ===
- Administrative official of the Governor-General of Korea

=== Advisors ===
- Gwon Jung-hyeon (권중현, 權重顯)
- Pak Yeong-hyo (박영효, 朴泳孝)
- Lee Wan-Yong (이완용, 李完用)
- Lee Yun-yong (이윤용, 李允用)
- Naitō Torajirō (內藤虎次郞)
- Hattori Unokitchi (服部宇之吉)
- Katsumi Kuroita (黒板勝美)
- Yamada Saburō (山田三良)
- Hayami Hiroshi (速水滉)

=== Committee member ===
- Eo Yunjeok (어윤적, 魚允迪)
- Yi Neunghwa (이능화, 李能和)
- Shōgo Oda (小田省吾)
- Ryū Imanishi (今西龍)

=== Commission member ===
- Choe Nam-seon (최남선, 崔南善)

=== Manager ===
- Inabe and the 3 other people.

=== Investigator ===
- Sin Seokho (신석호, 申奭鎬)
- Yi Byeongdo (이병도, 李丙燾)
- Hong Hee (홍희, 洪熹)
- Inaba Iwakichi (稲葉岩吉)
- Fujita Ryosaku (藤田亮策)
