= Chewang un'gi =

Historical poem composed by Yi Seung-hyu in 1287, in the late Goryeo period

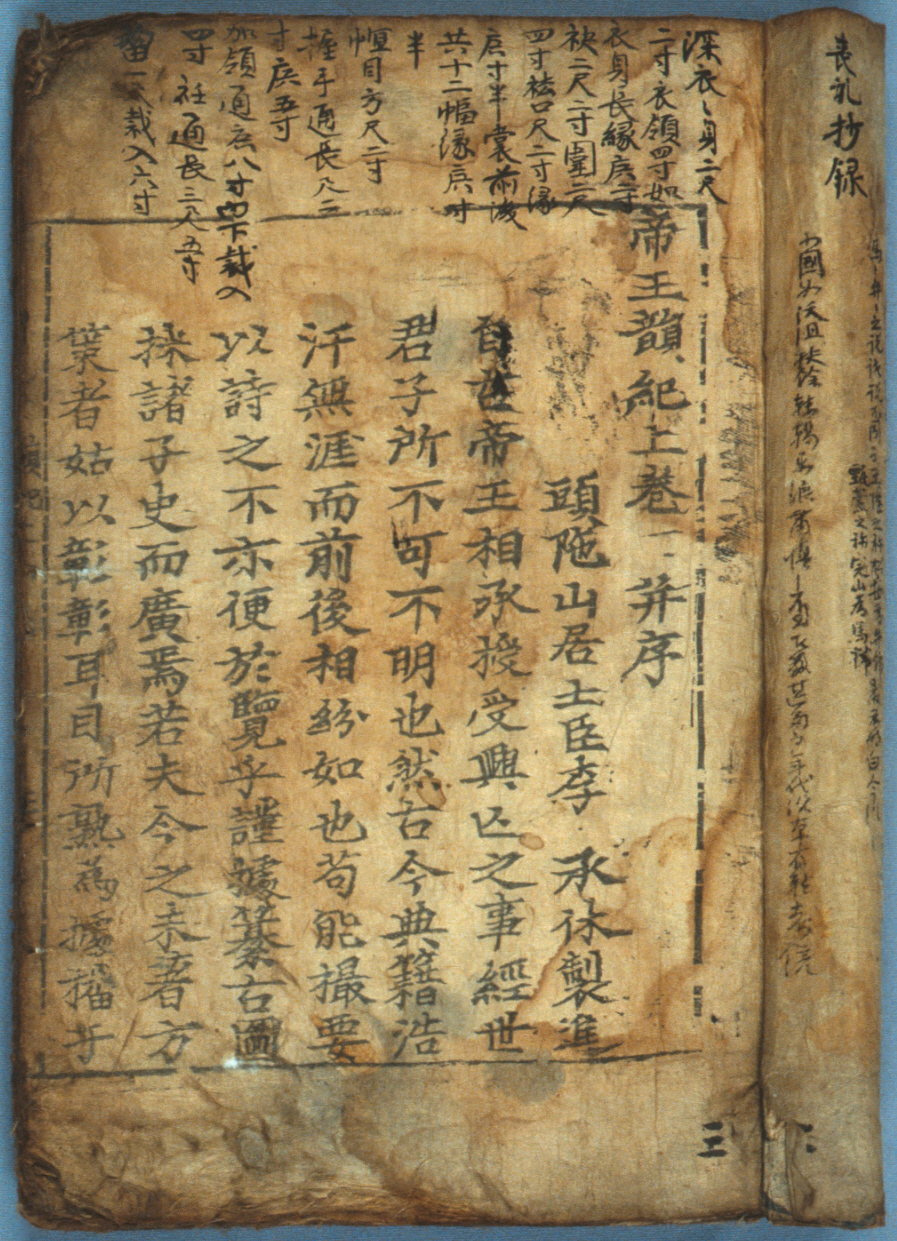

Korean name
- Hangul: 제왕운기
- Hanja: 帝王韻紀
- Revised Romanization: Jewang ungi
- McCune–Reischauer: Chewang un'gi

The Chewang un'gi (Songs of Emperors and Kings) is a historical poem composed by Yi Sŭnghyu (이승휴; 李承休) in 1287, in the late Goryeo period. Comprising two volumes, it depicts the history of Korea from Dangun to King Chungnyeol, and is the second-oldest text recounting the legend of Dangun. The title is sometimes alternatively translated Rhymed Chronicles of Emperors and Kings.

Yi composed the text after retiring from government service to the Cheoneunsa monastery on Duta-san mountain in Samcheok, in present-day Gangwon province.

The Chewang un'gi is considered important as it is the first history book to record the history of Balhae as Korean history, and has been cited by both North and South Korean scholars. According to Myungkyung University Professor Lee Sooyoung, Yi was motivated to write the Jewangungi due to both the internal political turmoil of the Goryeo court as well as the Yuan dynasty's interference in Goryeo politics during Goryeo under Mongol rule.

The first edition of the work was printed in 1295–1296 in Jinju, while Yi was still alive. Both extant texts, however, are from a revised woodcut edition printed in 1360 in Gyeongju. On April 1, 1965, the version kept in Uiwang was designated South Korean National Treasure No. 418. Another version, held at the Samseong Museum of Publishing in Seoul, was designated National Treasure No. 1091 in 1991.

== Structure ==
The Chewang un'gi consists of two volumes, both written in seven-character verse; the first deals with the history of China from the earliest years to the Jin dynasty (1115–1234), and the second covers Korean history from Dangun to King Chungnyeol. The second volume is divided into two parts, the first covering Korean history from Gojoseon to the Later Three Kingdoms period in 264 lines of seven-character verse, and second covering the Goryeo dynasty in five-character verse.

== See also ==
- Dangun
- Samguk yusa
