= Mun Il-pyeong =

Korean historian (1888–1939)

Korean name
- Hangul: 문일평
- Hanja: 文一平
- RR: Mun Ilpyeong
- MR: Mun Ilp'yŏng

Art name
- Hangul: 호암
- Hanja: 湖岩
- RR: Hoam
- MR: Hoam

Mun Il-pyeong (Korean: 문일평; 1888–1939) was a historian of the late Korean Joseon Dynasty, and an activist in the Korean independence movement during the period of Japanese rule. His art name was Ho Am.

== Early life ==
Mun Il-pyeong was born in the Uiju district of the North Pyeongan Province in the year 1888, the only son of Mun Cheon-du. He spent the majority of his early years in his home town studying Chinese literature and philosophy, until in 1905 when he left to continue his studies in Japan with colleagues such as Yi Gwangsu.

== Return to Korea ==
On his return to Korea in 1908, Mun taught at several universities, including Daesung University in Pyongyang, Yangsil University in his hometown of Uiju, and Kyeongsin Academy in Seoul. During this period, Mun participated in a secret movement (신민회) established to improve the educational system, instill nationalism, and organize nationalist movements in Korea.

== Continued study abroad ==
In 1911, Mun went to study in Japan's Waseda University, where he associated closely with An Jae-hong and Yun Hong-seob, and also with Kim Sung-soo and Chang Tŏksu who would later become founders of The Dong-A Ilbo newspaper.

The following year in 1912, Mun traveled to Shanghai China, where he resided in the French Concession area of the city. During his stay in Shanghai, Mun worked at a Chinese newspaper to which he contributed many lead articles, and also at several academies and companies in which he met and associated with Park Eun-sik, Shin Gyu-sik, and Shin Chaeho. Mun's opinions and views of the Korean people, the power of the press, revolutions, and Buddhism greatly evolved during this period.

== Nationalism and imprisonment ==
Upon his return to Korea, Mun engaged himself in nationalism and Korean independence-promoting activities among the people in the Korean independence movement. Mun was involved in the March First Movement and was one of many contributors to the Declaration of Korean Independence. Eleven days after the public reading of the Declaration of Korean Independence during the March First Movement, Mun publicly read the Declaration of Korean Independence in a loud voice and wearing a durumagi. For this he was arrested and imprisoned for 8 months.

== Later life and death ==
After his release from prison in 1920, Mun taught history at Jung-dong, Jung-ang, Baejae, and Songdo schools, and contributed articles on history to The Chosun Ilbo, Jung-wae Ilbo, and Kaebyeok, to increase national attention to history. Five years later in 1925 he again left to Japan to study history research, but returned after less than a year.

In April 1933 he became an editor of the Chosun Ilbo and focused on the popularization of history. He tried to find the essence of Korean traditional culture and spirit from history, and he continued his efforts to make the Korean people interested and aware of the importance of their history until his death in 1939 at the age of 52.

== Legacy ==
In a time when the Japanese imperialists aimed to break the Koreans' patriotism and ethnic spirit, Mun's research and efforts to spread Korean pride in their history had lasting effects on the people even after his death in the early 20th century. He helped lay the foundation of the study of Korean history by his efforts to give history meaning in addition to the study of fundamental historical fact. He also assisted in the work of organizing Korean historic records, and greatly helped in the popularization of history.

His writings dealt with various fields: nature, art, traditional activities, relics, etc. He methodically studied every field related to Korean history. Mun simplified the style of historical writings. He made the titles of history articles simple in that they aptly reflected the context, was objective, and his writings were short and easily understandable for the intention of making history more accessible to people.

Mun was especially interested in foreign policy and diplomacy of the pre-modern era. His study was not focused on finding the advantages of Korean history, but for self-examination and reflection. Like many other historians, he emphasized Joseon-sim (朝鮮心)

In 1995 the South Korean government conferred him posthumous honors, awarding him the Order of Merit for National Foundation.

== Bibliography ==
- Lee, Ki-Baik. A New History of Korea. Seoul: Ilchokak Publishers, (1984) ISBN 0-674-61575-1
- 김광남, 호암전집, 문일평의 인물평에 대하여, 역사연구 36, (1983)
- 김광남, 호암문일평의 외교인식, 역사연구 38, (1984)
