= Taehan kyenyŏnsa =

History book series about Korea

- Hangul: 대한계년사
- Hanja: 大韓季年史
- Revised Romanization: Daehan Gyenyeonsa
- McCune–Reischauer: Taehan Kyenyŏnsa

Taehan kyenyŏnsa (Korean: 대한계년사) is a book that chronicles the history of Korea during the late Joseon kingdom and Korean Empire. It covers the period between 1864 and 1910, and consists of 9 volumes. It was written by a minor government official and member of the Korean enlightenment movement, Jeong Gyo (鄭喬 1856–1925), about whom little is known. The books is chronologically ordered and much of the historical content is based upon Jeong's own experiences and eye-witness accounts, yielding up rich historical detail and anecdote not available elsewhere. It is particularly useful in its details of Korea's Independence Club.

It is currently stored in the library of Seoul National University.
