= Sindan minsa =

1904 Korean history book

Sindanminsa (Korean: 신단민사; Hanja: 神檀民史), literally "History of the Divine Tangun's People", is a Korean history book according to views of Daejongism. It covers the period from the founding of the Gojoseon through the Joseon period, and was written by Kim Gyoheon(2nd leader of religion Daejongism) in 1904.

The treatise divides Korean history into ten chronological segments: Shinshi, Gojoseon, Buyeo, Proto–Three Kingdoms period, North South States Period, Goryeo and Liao dynasty, Goryeo and Jin dynasty, Goryeo, Joseon, and Korea Empire.

== Content ==
The book covers history from the Shinshi era from 1894. The book also includes Mohe, xianbei,khitan. jurchen and Manchurian kingdoms, as it considers it part of korean history in the perspective that they were all in manchuria which was korean land in the time of Goguryeo. Here is the book contents list:

=== Volume 1 Earliest of the Ancients ===
Chapter 1 Shinshi era

Chapter 2 Baedal era(Gojoseon)

Chapter 3 Buyeo era

Chapter 4 Religion

Chapter 5 Law

chapter 6 Literature and technology

Chapter 7 Customs

=== Volume2 Ancient medieval times ===
Chapter 1 Proto–Three Kingdoms period(Yeolguksidae)

Chapter 2 Northern and Southern States period

Chapter 3 Religion

Chapter 4 Law

chapter 5 Literature and technology

Chapter 6 Customs

=== Volume 3 Early modern period. ===
Chapter 1 Goryeo and Liao dynasty period

Chapter 2 Goryeo and Jin dynasty period

Chapter 3 Goryeo period

Chapter 4 Religion

Chapter 5 Law

chapter 6 Literature and technology

Chapter 7 Customs

=== Volume 4 Modern period ===
Chapter 1 Joseon period

Chapter 2 Joseon and Qing dynasty

Chapter 3 Religion

Chapter 4 Law

chapter 5 Literature and technology

Chapter 6 Customs
