= Liuguiguo =

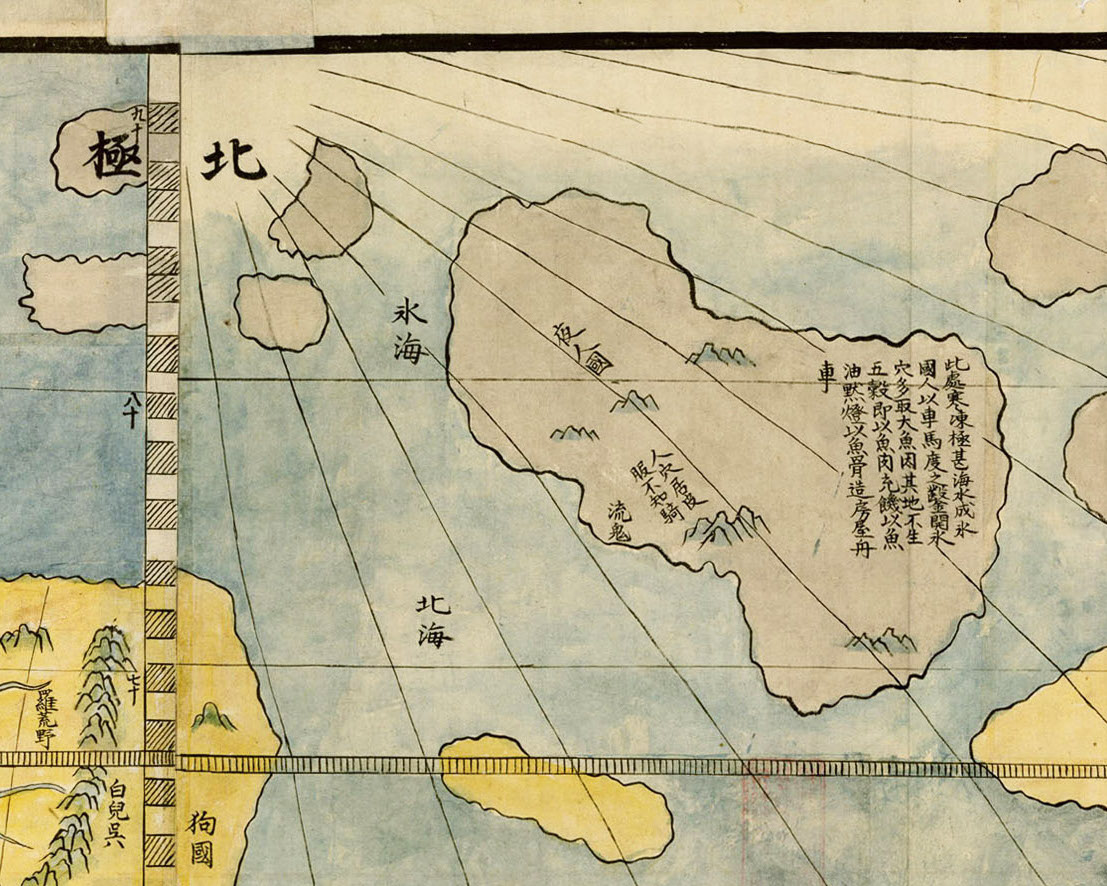
Detail of Matteo Ricci's Kunyu Wanguo Quantu showing Liugui 流鬼 on an island in the Bering Strait, with the nearby caption "the people live in caves, wear skins, and know not how to ride"「人穴居皮服不知騎」

Liuguiguo (Chinese: 流鬼國; lit. 'Land of the Floating Demons') is the toponym for the Liugui people documented in old Chinese records, including the Xin Tangshu, Zizhi Tongjian, and Wenxian Tongkao. Its location is uncertain, being placed by some in the area of Kamchatka and others beyond to the northeast. Matteo Ricci's Kunyu Wanguo Quantu depicts Luiguiguo as being located on a large island in the Bering Strait. Ricci description corresponds with what is known from these texts, both the Xin Tangshu and Zizhi Tongjian referring to furs, the former also to their inability to ride. A Liugui "tribute embassy" to the Tang in the fourteenth year of Zhenguan (640) is also documented.

== See also ==
- Okhotsk culture
