= Yi Pyong Do =

Korean historian (1896–1989)

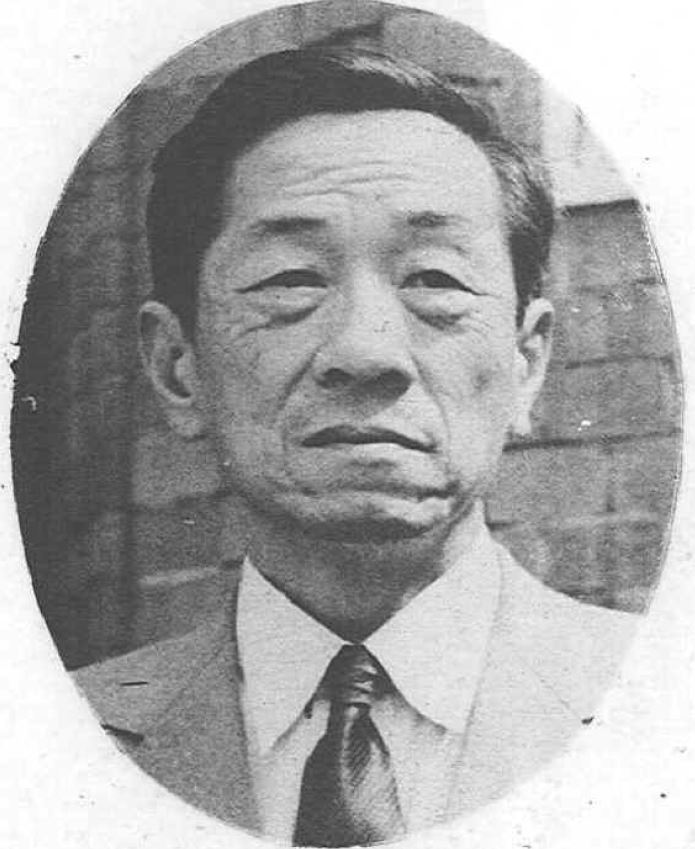
- Yi Pyong Do in 1955

Minister of Education
- In office April 28, 1960 – August 22, 1960
- Preceded by: Choi Jae-yu
- Succeeded by: Oh Cheon-seok

Personal details
- Born: April 28, 1896 Yongin, Gyeonggi Province, Joseon
- Died: August 14, 1989 (aged 93) Seoul, South Korea
- Spouse: Jo Nam-suk
- Children: 9
- Occupation: Historian

Korean name
- Hangul: 이병도
- Hanja: 李丙燾
- RR: I Byeongdo
- MR: I Pyŏngdo

Art name
- Hangul: 두계
- Hanja: 斗溪
- RR: Dugye
- MR: Tugye

Yi Pyong Do (Korean: 이병도; April 28, 1896 – August 14, 1989) was a Korean historian.

== Biography ==
He started working in Korean History Compilation Committee in 1927. In 1934, he founded the Chin-Tan Society, which would publish the first Korean-language academic journal on Korean history, the Chin-Tan Hakpo. From 1945 to 1962 he was Professor of Seoul Nation University. From 1955 to 1982 he was Committee of Korean Nation History Editor. In April 1960, he became the Minister of Education, but later resigned in August of that year.

== Japanese collaboration controversy ==
After the South Korean liberation from the Japan, there was a drive on the part of Korean historians to present a new history of Korea and it was called Hanguksa sillon. Yi Pyong Do was part of this initiative, which was viewed as new in name only because it inherited the colonialist racial perspective inherited from the Japanese scholarship.

Korean historians such as Cho Yun-jae, Son Chin-tae, and Yi In-yong, among other Chindan hakhoe historians followed another direction in their scholarship, which they also labeled "new" - the new nationalist historiography or sin-minjokjuui yoksahak. This group, specifically, excluded Yi Pyong Do due to his association with the colonial government, particularly the Chōsenshi Henshūkai, which was generally viewed as an instrument used to distort Korean history by suppressing or delegitimizing important texts such as the Samguk yusa. Some sources, however, point out that the charge could be political because the purge of collaborators became part of the post-liberation Korean politics.

Yi Pyong Do, himself, addressed the controversy by stressing that he worked for the Chōsenshi Henshūkai to prevent a Japanese distortion of Korean history, a position that echoed the same argument adopted by other historians identified with the Japanese colonial government.
