= Samseong Museum of Publishing =

Korean museum

Coordinates: 37.6086737°N 126.9570825°E

- Established: 1990
- Location: Seoul, South Korea
- Type: Private museum

The Samseong Museum of Publishing is a museum in Seoul, South Korea; it is a private museum related to printing and publishing. Located in Gugi-dong, Jongno-gu, visitors can see all manner of artifacts and historical items at the museum. It was founded in 1990 by Kim Jonggyu of the Samsung Publishing Company.

== See also ==
- List of museums in South Korea
