= Doksa Sillon =

1908 Korean history book by Shin Chaeho

- Hangul: 독사신론
- Hanja: 讀史新論
- Revised Romanization: Doksa sillon
- McCune–Reischauer: Toksa sillon

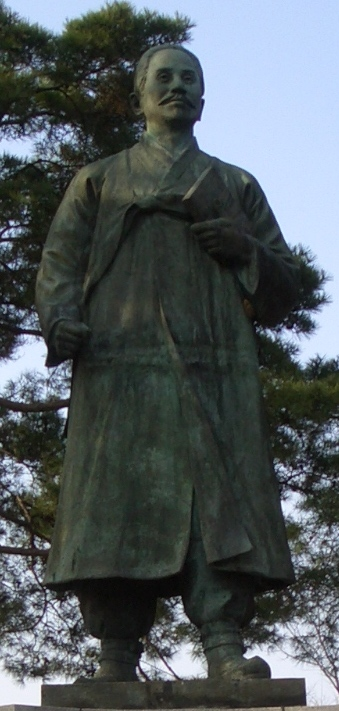
A statue of Shin Chaeho, the author of the Doksa Sillon, in Seoul Grand Park.

Doksa Sillon (Korean: 독사신론) or A New Reading of History (1908) is a book that discusses the history of Korea from the time of the mythical Dangun to the fall of the kingdom of Balhae in 926 CE. Its author––historian, essayist, and independence activist Shin Chaeho (1880–1936)––first published it as a series of articles in The Korea Daily News, of which he was the editor-in-chief.

As the first work to equate the history of Korea with the history of the Korean race (minjok), Doksa Sillon rejected the conventional Confucian histories that focused on the rise and fall of dynasties as well as the Japanese Pan-Asianist claims that Koreans, Japanese, and Chinese were all part of the "East Asian" or "yellow" race.

Influenced by Social Darwinism, Shin portrayed the Korean minjok as a warlike race (which he called "Buyeo" after the name of an ancient kingdom) that had constantly fought to preserve Korean identity but had later been weakened by Confucianized elites like the yangban of the Joseon Dynasty. Doksa Sillon was one of the earliest expressions of Korean ethnic nationalism and it laid the foundation for Korean nationalist historiography, which used the study of ancient Korea to resist Japanese colonial scholarship while Korea was under Japanese rule.

== Bibliography ==
- Em, Henry H. (1998). "Democracy and Korean Unification from a Post-Nationalist Perspective." Asea yongu 41.2: 43-74.
- Em, Henry H. (1999). "Minjok as a Modern and Democratic Construct: Sin Ch'aeho's Historiography." In Colonial Modernity in Korea, edited by Gi-wook Shin and Michael Robinson, pp. 336–61. Cambridge: Harvard University Asia Center, distributed by Harvard University Press.
- Jager, Sheila Miyoshi. (2003). Narratives of Nation-Building in Korea: A Genealogy of Patriotism. New York: M.E. Sharpe.
- Kim Bongjin. (2011). "Sin Ch'ae-ho: 'A Critique of Easternism,' 1909." In Sven Saaler and Christopher W.A. Szpilman, eds., Pan-Asianism: A Documentary History, Volume 1: 1850-1920, pp. 191–94. Plymouth, England: Rowman & Littlefield.
- Ryang, Key S. (1987). "Sin Ch'ae-ho (1880-1936) and Modern Korean Historiography." The Journal of Modern Korean Studies 3: 1-10.
- Schmid, Andre. (1997). "Rediscovering Manchuria: Sin Ch'aeho and the Politics of Territorial History in Korea." Journal of Asian Studies 56.1: 26-46.
- Schmid, Andre. (2002). Korea Between Empires, 1895-1919. New York: Columbia University Press.
- Xu, Stella Yingzi. (2007). "That glorious ancient history of our nation: The contested re-readings of 'Korea' in early Chinese historical records and their legacy in the formation of Korean-ness." PhD dissertation, Department of East Asian Languages and Culture, UCLA.
