= Ch'oe Namsŏn =

Korean historian (1890–1957)

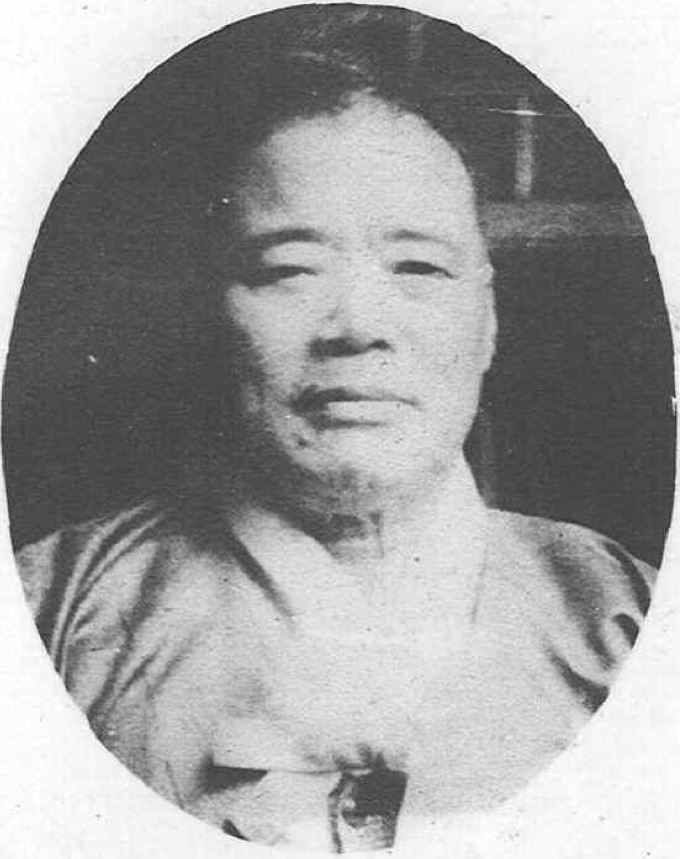

Korean name
- Hangul: 최남선
- Hanja: 崔南善
- RR: Choe Namseon
- MR: Ch'oe Namsŏn

Art name
- Hangul: 육당
- Hanja: 六堂
- RR: Yukdang
- MR: Yuktang

Courtesy name
- Hangul: 공륙
- Hanja: 公六
- RR: Gongryuk
- MR: Kongnyuk

Ch'oe Namsŏn (Korean: 최남선; April 26, 1890 – October 10, 1957), also known by the Japanese pronunciation of his name Sai Nanzen, was a Korean historian, political activist, poet, and publisher who was best remembered as a leading member of the Korean independence movement.

== Early life and education ==
He was born into a chungin (class between aristocrats and commoners) family in Seoul, Joseon. He was educated in Seoul. In 1904 he went to study in Japan, and was greatly impressed by the Meiji Restoration reforms. Upon his return to Korea, Ch'oe became active in the Patriotic Enlightenment Movement, which sought to modernize Korea.

== Career ==
Ch'oe published Korea's first successful modern magazine, Sonyŏn (소년; lit. 'Youth'), through which he sought to bring modern knowledge about the world to Korea's youth. He coined the term Hangul for the Korean alphabet and promoted it as a literary medium through his magazines. The author of the first “new-style” poem, “From the Ocean to the Youth” (해(海)에게서 소년에게, 1908), he is widely credited with pioneering modern Korean poetry. Ch'oe sought to create a new style of literary Korean that would be more accessible to ordinary people. But at the same time, he was proud of classical Korean literature and he founded the Association of Korea's Glorious Literature in 1910 that sought to encourage ordinary people to read the classics of Korean literature that until then had been mostly read by the elites. Through the work of the Chinese nationalist writer Liang Qichao, Ch'oe learned of the Western theories of Social Darwinism and the idea that history was nothing more than an endless struggle between various people to dominate each other with only the fittest surviving. Ch'oe believed that this competition would only end with Korea ruling the world. In a 1906 essay he wrote:

"How long will it take us to accomplish the goal of flying our sacred national flag above the world and having people of the five continents kneeling down before it? Exert yourselves, our youth!"

Ch'oe's magazine Sonyŏn was intended to popularize Western ideas about science and technology though a more readable Korean that would modernize the Korean nation for Social Darwinist competition for world domination. Japan's annexation of Korea in 1910 accelerated the independence movement. Influenced by Social Darwinist theories, Ch'oe urged in numerous articles that the Koreans would have to modernize in order to be strong to survive. In a 1917 article in Hwangsŏng sinmun, Ch'oe wrote:

"The modern age is the age of power in which the powerful survive while the weak perish. This competition continues until death. But why? Because the struggle to be a victor and a survivor never ends. But how? It is a competition of intelligence, physical fitness, material power, economic power, the power of idea and confidence, and of organizational power. Everywhere this competition is underway daily."

In 1919, Ch'oe, together with Ch'oe Rin, organized the March First Movement, a non-violent movement to regain Korean sovereignty and independence. For his drafting of the Korean Declaration of Independence, he was arrested by authorities and imprisoned until 1921. In 1928 he joined the Korean History Compilation Committee, which was established by the Governor-General of Chōsen and commissioned to compile the history of Korea. Here he sought to refute the Japanese imperialist interpretations of ancient Korean history by arguing that ancient Korea was not an impoverished backwater existing in the shadow of Japan, but rather the center of a vibrant civilization. Ch'oe embarked on a re-examination of Korean history. Ch'oe mostly ignored the Samguk sagi, and instead chose to draw his history from Samguk yusa, a collection of folktales, stories, and legends, previously disregarded by historians. A major theme of his scholarship was that Korea was always a major center of Asian civilization, instead being in the periphery. Ch'oe claimed in his 1926 book Treatise on Tan'gun (단군논, Tan'gunnon) that ancient Korea had outshone both Japan and China. The status of legendary Emperor Tan'gun as one of the central figures of Korean history was largely due to Ch'oe. Ch'oe did not accept the Tan'gun legend as written, but he argued that the Tan'gun story reflected the shamanistic religion of ancient Korea, and that Tan'gun was a legendary figure based on a real shaman-ruler who lived sometime in the very distant past. In addition, Ch'oe claimed that civilizations of ancient India, Greece, the Middle East, Italy, northern Europe, and the Mayas all had their origins in the ancient civilization of Korea.

In 1937, Ch'oe started to write articles supporting Japan's aggression against China. In 1939 he became a professor at the Manchukuo Jianguo University. In November 1943, Ch'oe attended the Greater East Asia Conference in Tokyo, which was intended by the Japanese government to mobilize support for the war throughout Asia for its Pan-Asian war goals. During the conference, Ch'oe delivered a speech to a group of Korean students studying in Japan calling the "Anglo-Saxon" powers Britain and America the most deadly enemies of Asians everywhere, and urged the students to do everything in their power to support the war against the "Anglo-Saxons", saying that there was no higher honor for a Korean than to die fighting for Japan's efforts to create the "Greater East Asia Co-Prosperity Sphere". During his speech, Ch'oe praised Japanese imperialism and stated that the Koreans were fortunate to be colonized by Japan. Ch'oe also claimed that originally Korean culture had been violent and militaristic much like Japanese culture, but then had gone "soft" under Chinese influence. Furthermore, Ch'oe suggested that his historical research had established that the Japanese were the descendants of immigrants from Korea, and the samurai being of Korean descent had preserved the true, violent essence of ancient Korean culture. The South Korean historian Kyung Moon Hwang wrote that there is a striking contrast between Ch'oe, the passionate patriot who penned the Declaration of Independence in 1919 vs. Ch'oe, the chinilpa collaborator of 1943 urging Korean university students to enlist in the Imperial Japanese Army and die for the Emperor of Japan. Kyung suggested that the change in Ch'oe was caused by the fact that Japan had occupied Korea in 1904 during the Russian-Japanese War and by the early 1940s, the "permanence" of Japanese rule was assumed by most Koreans as every attempt to win independence had always ended in failure. Given this situation, Koreans like Ch'oe had lost their youthful idealism and abandoned their dreams of freedom, simply hoping to reach an accommodation with the Japanese that might at least preserve some sort of Korean cultural identity.

In 1949, Syngman Rhee’s government arrested Ch'oe for collaboration with the Japanese during the colonial period, but he was released when the trial was suspended. During the Korean War, Ch'oe served on the Naval History Committee; after the war, he served on the Seoul City History Committee. He died in October 1957 after struggles with diabetes and hypertension. Ch'oe remains a deeply controversial figure in Korea today, being respected for his historical work and his efforts to create the modern Korean language while being condemned for his wartime statements supporting Japan.

== Representative works ==
In addition to a large body of historical works, Ch'oe’s writings range from poetry, song lyrics, travelogues, to literary, social, and cultural criticism. His representative books include:

- The History of Chosŏn (1931)
- The Encyclopedia of Korean History (1952)
- The Annotated Samgukyusa (1940)
- Simchun Sulle (The Pilgrimage in Search of Spring, 1925)
- Paektusan Kunchamgi (The Travels to Paektu Mountain, 1926)
- Kumkang Yechan (A Paean to Kumgang, 1928)
- Paekpal Ponnoe (One-Hundred-and-Eight Agonies, 1926)
- Kosatong (A Collection of Ancient Stories, 1943)
- Simundokpon (A Reader of Modern Writing, 1916)

== See also ==
- Korean independence movement
