= Timeline of Christian missions =

This timeline of Christian missions chronicles the global expansion of Christianity through a listing of the most significant missionary outreach events. Christian missions began from the earliest days of Christianity and its adherents believe that the mission will continue until Jesus Christ returns.

== Apostolic Age ==
Earliest dates must all be considered approximate

- 33 – Great Commission of Jesus to go and make disciples of all nations; Pentecost, a day in which 3000 Jews from a variety of Mediterranean Basin nations are converted to faith in Jesus Christ.
- 34 – In Gaza, Philip baptizes a convert, an Ethiopian who was already a Jewish proselyte.
- 34 – Saul of Tarsus is converted.
- 39 – Peter preaches to a Gentile audience in the house of Cornelius in Caesarea Maritima.
- 42 – Mark goes to Alexandria in Egypt
- 47 – Paul (also known as Saul of Tarsus) begins his first missionary journey to Western Anatolia, part of modern-day Turkey via Cyprus.
- 50 – Council of Jerusalem on admitting Gentiles into the Church
- 51 – Paul begins his second missionary journey, a trip that will take him through modern-day Turkey and on into Greece
- 52 – Thomas arrives in Malabar and Coromandel Coast in India and founds a church that subsequently becomes the Syrian Malabar Nasranis
- 54 – Paul begins his third missionary journey
- 60 – Paul sent to Rome under Roman guard, evangelizes on Malta after shipwreck

== Early Christianity ==
- 100 – First Christians are reported in Monaco, Algeria; a missionary goes to Arbela, a sacred city of the Assyrians that the Christian church is katholikos ("universal")
- 112 – Pliny the Younger reports rapid growth of Christianity in Bithynia
- 140 – Hermas writes: "The Son of God ... has been preached to the ends of the earth"
- 150 – Gospel reaches Portugal and Morocco
- 166 – Bishop Soter writes that the number of Christians has surpassed the Jews
- 174 – First Christians reported in Austria
- 177 – Churches in Lyon and Vienne (southern France) report being persecuted
- 190 – Pataenus of Alexandria goes to India in response to an appeal for Christian teachers
- 196 – In Assuristan (Parthian ruled Assyria) Bar Daisan writes of Christians among the Assyrians, Parthians, Bactrians (Kushans), and other peoples in the Persian Empire
- 197 – Tertullian writes that Christianity had penetrated all ranks of society in North Africa
- 200 – First Christians are reported in Switzerland and Belgium
- 206 – Abgar, the Syriac King of Edessa, embraces the Christian faith
- 208 – Tertullian writes that Christ has followers on the far side of the Roman wall in Britain where Roman legions have not yet penetrated
- 250 – Denis (or Denys or Dionysius) is sent from Rome along with six other missionaries to establish the church in Paris
- 270 – Death of Gregory Thaumaturgus, Christian leader in Pontus. It was said that when Gregory became "bishop" there were only 17 Christians in Pontus while at his death thirty years later there were only 17 non-Christians.
- 280 – First rural churches emerge in northern Italy; Christianity is no longer exclusively in urban areas
- 287 – Maurice from Egypt is killed at Agauno, Switzerland for refusing to sacrifice to pagan divinities
- 300 – First Christians reported in Greater Khorasan; an estimated 10% of the world's population is now Christian; parts of the Bible are available in 10 different languages
- 304 – Armenia accepts Christianity as state religion
- 306 – The first bishop of Nisibis is ordained
- 311 – The Edict of Serdica was issued in Serdica by the Roman emperor Galerius, officially ending the Diocletian persecution of Christianity in the East.
- 313 – Emperor Constantine issues Edict of Milan, legalizing Christianity in the Roman Empire
- 314 – Tiridates III of Armenia and King Urnayr of Caucasian Albania converted by Gregory the Illuminator

== Era of the seven Ecumenical Councils ==
- 327 – Georgian King Mirian III of Iberia converted by Nino
- 330 – Ethiopian King Ezana of Axum makes Christianity an official religion
- 332 – Two young Roman Christians, Frumentius and Aedesius, are the sole survivors of a ship destroyed in the Red Sea due to tensions between Rome and Aksum. They are taken as slaves to the Ethiopian capital of Axum to serve in the royal court.
- 334 – The first bishop is ordained for Merv / Transoxiana (area of modern-day Uzbekistan, Tajikistan, Turkmenistan and southwest Kazakhstan)
- 337 – Emperor Constantine baptized shortly before his death
- 341 – Ulfilas begins work with the Goths in present-day Romania
- 343 – The Council of Serdica, or Synod of Serdica (also Sardica), was a synod convened in 343 at Serdica in the civil diocese of Dacia, by Roman dominate Emperors Constans I, augustus in the West, and Constantius II, augustus in the East. It attempted to resolve the Arian controversy, and was attended by about 170 bishops. It was convened by the two augusti at the request of Pope Julius I.
- 350 – Bible is translated into the Sahidic dialect of the Egyptian Coptic language.
- 354 – Theophilus "the Indian" reports visiting Christians in India; Philostorgius mentions a community of Christians on the Socotra islands, south of Yemen in the Arabian Sea
- 364 – Conversion of Vandals to Christianity begins during reign of Emperor Valens
- 370 – Wulfila translates the Bible into Gothic, the first Bible translation done specifically for missionary purposes
- 378 – Jerome writes, "From India to Britain, all nations resound with the death and resurrection of Christ"
- 380 – Roman Emperor Theodosius I makes Christianity the official state religion
- 382 – Jerome is commissioned to translate the Gospels (and subsequently the whole Bible) into Latin.
- 386 – Augustine of Hippo converted
- 397 – Ninian evangelizes the Southern Picts of Scotland; three missionaries sent to the mountaineers in the Trento region of northern Italy are martyred
- 400 – Hayyan begins proclaiming gospel in Yemen after having been converted in Hirta on the Persian border; in starting a school for native Gothic evangelists, John Chrysostom writes, "'Go and make disciples of all nations' was not said for the Apostles only, but for us also"
- 410 – New Testament translated into Armenian
- 420 – A Pre-Islam Arabian Bedouin tribe under sheikh Peter-Aspebet is converted
- 425 – The first bishops are ordained for Herat (Afghanistan) and Samarkand (Uzbekistan)
- 432 – Patrick goes to Ireland as missionary
- 450 – First Christians reported in Liechtenstein
- 496 – Conversion of Clovis I, king of Franks in Gaul, along with 3,000 warriors
- 499 – Persian king Kavadh I, fleeing his country, meets a group of Christian missionaries going to Central Asia to preach to the Turks
- 500 – First Christians reported in North Yemen; Nairam becomes Christian center
- 508 – Philoxenus of Mabug begins translation of the Bible into Syriac
- 529 – Benedict of Nursia destroys a pagan temple at Monte Cassino (Italy) and builds a monastery
- 535 – The Hephthalite Huns – nomads living in northern China and Central Asia, who were also known as the White Huns – are taught to read and write by Church of the East missionaries.
- 542 – Julian (or Julianus) from Constantinople begins evangelizing Nubia, accompanied by an Egyptian named Theodore
- 563 – Columba sails from Ireland to Scotland where he founds an evangelistic training center on Iona
- 569 – Longinus, church leader in Nobatia, evangelizes Alodia (in what is now Sudan)
- 578 – Conversion to Christianity of An-numan III, last of Lakhmids (Pre Islam Arab prince)
- 585 – Irish missionary Columbanus arrives with twelve fellow missionaries in Brittany, France
- 592 – Death of Celtic/Irish missionary Moluag (Old Irish: Mo-Luóc)
- 596 – Gregory the Great sends Augustine and a team of missionaries to (what is now) England to reintroduce the Gospel. The missionaries settle in Canterbury and within a year baptize 10,000 people
- 600 – First Christian settlers in Andorra (between France and Spain)
- 604 – A church is reportedly planted on Thorney Island (where Westminster Abbey now stands)
- 610 – Saint Columbanus and Saint Gall flee from Luxeuil (France) to Alemannia and preach the Gospel in Tuggen and Bregenz
- 627 – Conversion of King Edwin of Northumbria
- 629 – Amandus of Elnon is consecrated a missionary bishop. He evangelized the region around Ghent and went on missions to Slavs along the Danube and to Basques in Navarre
- 630 – Conversion of the East Angles (one of the seven kingdoms of the Anglo-Saxon Heptarchy)
- 635 – First Christian missionaries (Church of the East monks, including Alopen, from Asia Minor and Persia arrive in China; Aidan of Lindisfarne begins evangelizing in the heart of Northumbria (England)
- 637 – Lombards, a German people living in northern Italy, become Christians
- 638 – A church building is erected in Chang'an, then perhaps the largest city in the world (see Daqin Pagoda)
- 647 – Amadeus, bishop of Maastricht, carries out missionary work in Frisia (Netherlands) and among the Slavs
- 650 – First church organized in Netherlands
- 673 – Irish monk Maol Rubha founds a training center at Aprochrosan that would serve as a base for missionary outreach into Scotland
- 680 – First translation of Christian scriptures into Arabic
- 687 – Conversion of Sussex
- 689 – Pagans kill Irish missionary Kilian near Würzburg in what is now Germany.
- 692 – Willibrord and 11 companions cross the North Sea to become missionaries to the Frisians (modern-day Netherlands)
- 697 – Muslims overrun Carthage, capital of North Africa
- 720 – Caliph Umar II puts heavy pressure on the Christian Berbers to convert to Islam
- 716 – Boniface begins missionary work among Germanic tribes
- 724 – Boniface fells pagan sacred oak of Thor at Geismar in Hesse (Germany)
- 732 – Muslim advance from Spain and southern France stopped by Charles Martel at the Battle of Tours and Poitiers
- 740 – Irish monks reach Iceland
- 771 – Charlemagne becomes king and decree that sermons will be given in the vernacular. He also commissioned Bible translations.
- 781 – Xi'an Stele erected near Xi'an (China) to commemorate the propagation in China of the Luminous Religion, thus providing a written record of a Christian presence in China
- 787 – Liudger begins missionary work among the pagans near the mouth of the Ems river (in Germany)

== Middle Ages ==
- 822 – Mojmír I of Great Moravia, converts to Christianity
- 826 – Ansgar from France is sent by papal authority to Denmark as a royal chaplain and missionary; Harald Klak is baptized along with 400 of his followers at Mainz
- 828 – First Christian church in present-day Slovakia is built in Nitra; First missionaries reach the area that is now the Czech Republic
- 830 – Scots-born Erluph is evangelizing in (what is now) Germany when he is killed by the Vandals
- 859 – Execution of Eulogius of Córdoba, proponent of confrontational Christian witness in Spain and other Muslim-dominated societies. Opposed to any feeling of affinity with Muslim culture, Eulogius advocated using a missiology of martyrdom to confront Islam.
- 863 – Cyril and Methodius are invited by Rastislav to evangelize in Great Moravia and the Balaton Principality
- 864 – Conversion of Prince Boris of Bulgaria and Christianization of Bulgaria
- 867 – All Serbian tribes are fully Christianized
- 878 – Last definite reference to Christians in China before the Mongol era
- 880 – First Slavic archbishopric established in Great Moravia with Methodius as its head; Bible translated into Slavonic
- 900 – Missionaries from the archdiocese of Bremen-Hamburg reach Norway
- 912 – The Normans become Christian
- 948 – The leader of the Magyars converts to Christianity
- 957 – Princess Olga of Kiev baptized
- 965 – Harold I of Denmark converts to Christianity and smooths the way for the acceptance of Christian faith by the Danish people
- 966 – Mieszko I of Poland converts to Christianity and begins the period of Christian Poland
- 987 – Church of the East monks visiting China find no traces of Christian community left
- 988 – Baptism of Kievan Rus' under Vladimir I
- 995 – Christian missionaries from Norway begin working in Iceland
- 997 – Adalbert of Prague dies as a martyr in Prussia

== 1000 to 1499 ==
- 1000 – Christianity accepted by common consent in Iceland by parliament (Alþingi). Leif the Lucky introduces the Gospel to Greenland, possibly Vinland (Newfoundland)
- 1003 – The Hungarian king sends evangelists to Transylvania
- 1008 – Sigfrid (or Sigurd), English missionary, baptizes King Olof of Sweden
- 1009 – Bruno of Querfurt is beheaded in Prussia where he had gone as a missionary
- 1015 – Russia is said to have been "comprehensively" converted to the Orthodox faith; Olaf II Haroldsson becomes the first king of the whole of Norway. Over the next 15 years he would organize Norway's final conversion and its integration into Christian Europe.
- 1017 – Günther tries to convert the inhabitants of Vorpommern; the mission is not successful.
- 1122 – Bernhard, later bishop of Lebus launches an unsuccessful mission in the Duchy of Pomerania
- 1124–28 – Otto von Bamberg succeeds in the Conversion of Pomerania Bishopric of Cammin established in Pomerania in 1140.
- 1168 – Absalon subdues and converts the Principality of Rügen
- 1200 – The Bible is now available in 22 different languages
- 1210 – Franciscan Order established
- 1216 – Dominican Order established
- 1219 – Francis of Assisi presents the Gospel to the Sultan of Egypt
- 1225 – Pope Honorius III issues Vineae Domini custodes in which he gives permission to and exhorts the Dominicans and Franciscans to join the mission to Morocco
- 1227 – Prince Bort converted and baptized in Ukraine
- 1244 – Christians are reported in Lithuania with King Mindaugas being baptized in 1251
- 1253 – Franciscan William of Rubruck begins his journey to the Mongols
- 1266 – Mongol leader Khan sends Marco Polo's father and uncle, Niccolo and Matteo Polo, back to Europe with a request to the Pope to send 100 Christian missionaries (only two responded and one died before reaching Mongol territory)
- 1276 – Ramon Llull opens training center to send missionaries to North Africa
- 1291 – Appointment of first indigenous bishop in Finland
- 1294 – Franciscan Giovanni di Monte Corvino arrives in China
- 1303 – Arnold of Cologne arrives in China to assist Giovanni di Monte Corvino
- 1321 – Jordanus, a Dominican friar, arrives in India as the first resident Roman Catholic missionary
- 1322 – Odoric of Pordenone, a Franciscan friar from Italy, arrives in China
- 1323 – Franciscans make contacts on Sumatra, Java, and Borneo
- 1326 – Chaghatayid Khan Ilchigedai grants permission for a church to be built in Samarkand, Uzbekistan
- 1329 – Nicaea falls to Muslim Ottoman Turks
- 1334 – Chaghatayid Khan Buzun allows Christians to rebuild churches and permits Franciscans to establish a missionary episcopate in Almaliq, Azerbaijan
- 1368 – Collapse of the Franciscan mission in China as Ming Dynasty abolishes Christianity
- 1379 – Russian Orthodox missionary Stephen of Perm travels north toward the White Sea and settles among the Komi peoples living between Pechora and Vychegda Rivers at Ust-Vim
- 1382 – Bible translated into English from Latin by John Wycliff
- 1386 – Jogaila (baptized – Wladyslaw II), king of the Lithuanians, is baptized
- 1389 – Large numbers of Christians march through the streets of Cairo, denouncing Islam and lamenting that they had abandoned the religion of their fathers from fear of persecution. They were beheaded, both men and women, and a fresh persecution of Christians followed
- 1400 – Scriptures translated into Icelandic
- 1408 – Spanish Dominican Vincent Ferrer begins a ministry in Italy in which it is said that thousands of Jews and Muslims were won to faith in Christ
- 1410 – Bible is translated into Hungarian
- 1420 – Franciscan missionaries accompany Portuguese expedition to Madeira
- 1431 – Franciscan missionaries accompany Portuguese expedition to the Azores
- 1435 – Forced conversion of Jews in Palma de Mallorca, Spain
- 1445 – First Christians reported in Guinea-Bissau
- 1448 – First Christians reported in Mauritania
- 1450 – Franciscan missionaries accompany Portuguese expedition to the Cape Verde Islands
- 1453 – Constantinople falls to the Muslim Ottoman Turks who make it their capital. An Islamic service of thanksgiving is held in the church of Saint Sophia
- 1455 – With the bull Romanus Pontifex the patronage of missions in new countries behind Cape Bojador is given to the Portuguese (see "Padroado").
- 1462 – Johannes Gutenberg begins printing the Bible with his movable-type printing process; Pope Pius II assigns the evangelization of the Portuguese Guinea Coast of Africa to the Franciscans led by Alfonso de Bolano
- 1485 – After having come into contact with the Portuguese, the King of Benin requests that a church be planted in his kingdom
- 1486 – Dominicans become active in West Africa, notably among the Wolof people in Senegambia.
- 1489 – Baptism of Wolof king Behemoi in Senegal
- 1491 – The Congo sees its first group of missionaries arrive. Under the ministry of these Franciscan and Dominican priests, the king would soon be baptized and a church built at the royal capital.
- 1492 – Birth of the church in Angola
- 1493 – Pope Alexander VI allows Spain to colonize the New World with Catholic missions; Christopher Columbus takes Christian priests with him on his second journey to the New World
- 1494 – First missionaries arrive in Dominican Republic
- 1495 – The head of a convent in Seville, Spain, Mercedarian Jorge, makes a trip to the West Indies.
- 1496 – First Christian baptisms in the New World take place when Guaticaba along with other members of his household are baptized on the island of Hispaniola
- 1497 – Forced conversion of Jews in Portugal
- 1498 – First Christians are reported in Kenya
- 1499 – Portuguese Augustinian missionaries arrive at Zanzibar. Their mission will end in 1698 due to the Oman-Arab conquest.

== 1500 to 1600 ==
- 1500 – Franciscans enter Brazil with Cabral
- 1501 – Portuguese explorer João da Nova builds a chapel at Mossel Bay, the first one in South Africa
- 1501 – Pope Alexander VI grants to the crown of Spain all the newly discovered countries in the Americas, on condition that provision be made for the religious instruction of the native populations
- 1502 – Bartolomé de las Casas, who will later become an ardent defender of the indigenous peoples of the Americas, goes to Cuba. For his military services there he will be given an encomienda, an estate that included the services of the Indigenous peoples of the Americas living on it.
- 1503 – Mar Elijah, Patriarch of the East Syrian church, sends three missionaries "to the islands of the sea which are inside Java and to China."
- 1506 – Mission work begun in Mozambique
- 1508 – Franciscans begin evangelizing in Venezuela
- 1509 – First church building constructed on Puerto Rico
- 1510 – Dominicans begin work in Haiti
- 1511 – Martin de Valencia came to believe that Psalm 58 prophesied the conversion of all unbelievers. While reflecting on the Scripture passage, he asked, "When will this be? When will this prophecy be filled . . . we are already in the afternoon, at the end of our days, and the world's final era." Later that same week, while reading aloud from the prophet Isaiah, he reportedly saw a vision of vast multitudes being converted and baptised. He began to pray to be chosen to preach and convert all heathen. He would die 20 years later as a missionary to Mexico.
- 1512 – Dominican missionary Antonio de Montesino returns to Spain to try to convince King Ferdinand that all is not as it should be in the new western colonies. He reported that on the islands of Hispaniola (now Dominican Republic and Haiti) and Cuba, the indigenous peoples were rapidly dying out under the system of slavery used by the colonists.
- 1513 – In Cuba, Bartolomé de las Casas is ordained (possibly the first ordination in the New World). Soon thereafter, Las Casas will renounce all claims to his Indian serfs
- 1515 – Portuguese missionary Francisco Álvares is sent on a diplomatic mission to Dawit II, the Negus or Emperor of Abyssinia (an old name for Ethiopia)
- 1515 – Portuguese missionaries begin work in Benin, Nigeria
- 1517 – The Mughal Rulers of Delhi opened the door of Bengal to Christian missionaries
- 1518 – Don Henrique, son of the king of the Congo, is consecrated by Pope Leo X as the first indigenous bishop from sub-Saharan Black Africa
- 1519 – Two Franciscans accompany Hernán Cortés in his expedition to Mexico
- 1520 – German missionary Maximilian Uhland, also known as Bernardino de San José, goes to Hispaniola with the newly appointed Bishop Alessandro Geraldini.
- 1521 – Pope Leo X grants Franciscan Francis Quiñones permission and faculties to go as a missionary to the New World together with Juan Clapión
- 1522 – Portuguese missionaries establish presence on coast of Sri Lanka and begin moving inland in the wake of Portuguese military units
- 1523 – Martin Luther writes a missionary hymn based on Psalm 67, Es woll uns Gott genädig sein. It has been called "the first missionary hymn of Protestantism."
- 1524 – Martin de Valencia goes to New Spain with 12 Franciscan friars
- 1525 – Italian Franciscan missionary Giulio Zarco is sent to Michoacán on the western coast of Mexico where he will become very proficient in some of the indigenous languages
- 1526 – Franciscans enter Florida; Twelve Dominican friars arrive in the Mexican capital
- 1527 – Martyrs' Synod — organized by Anabaptists, it is the first Protestant missionary conference
- 1528 – Franciscan missionary Juan de Padilla arrives in Mexico. He will accompany Coronado's expedition searching for the Seven Cities and eventually settle among the Quivira (now called the Wichita)
- 1529 – Franciscan Peter of Ghent writes from Latin America that he and a colleague had baptized 14,000 people on one day
- 1531 – Franciscan Juan de Padilla begins a series of missionary tours among Indian tribes southeast of Mexico City
- 1532 – Evangelization of Peru begins when missionaries arrive with Francisco Pizarro's military expedition
- 1533 – The Pechenga Monastery is founded in the Extreme North of Russia to preach Gospel to the Sami people; Augustinian order arrives in Mexico; First Christian missionaries arrive in Tonkin, what is now Vietnam
- 1534 – The entire caste of Paravas on the Coromandel Coast are baptized—perhaps 20,000 people in all
- 1536 – Northern Italian Anabaptist missionary Hans Oberecker is burned at the stake in Vienna.
- 1537 – Pope Paul III orders that the Indigenous peoples of the Americas of the New World be brought to Christ "by the preaching of the divine word, and with the example of the good life."
- 1538 – Franciscans enter Paraguay
- 1539 – The Pueblos of what is now the U.S. Southwest are encountered by Spanish Franciscan missionary Marcos de Niza
- 1539 – Together with two friends Ignatius of Loyola forms the Society of Jesus which is approved by Pope Paul III one year later.
- 1540 – Franciscans arrive in Trinidad and are killed by cannibals
- 1541 – Franciscans begin establishing missions in California
- 1542 – Francis Xavier goes to the Portuguese colony of Goa in West India
- 1543 – Anabaptist Menno Simons leaves the Netherlands and begins planting churches in Germany
- 1544 – Franciscan Andrés de Olmos, leads group of Indian converts to Tamaulipas
- 1545 – Testifying to the power that letters back home from missionaries have had, Antonio Araoz writes about Francis Xavier: "No less fruit has been obtained in Spain and Portugal through his letters than has been obtained in the Indies through his teaching."
- 1546 – Xavier travels to the Indonesian islands of Morotai, Ambon, and Ternate
- 1547 – Wealthy Spaniard Juan Fernández becomes a Jesuit. He will go to Japan as a missionary.
- 1548 – Xavier founds the College of the Holy Name of God in Baçaim on the northwest coast of India
- 1549 – Dominican Luis Cancer, who had worked among the Mayans of Guatemala and Mexico, lands at Tampa Bay (Florida) with two companions. They are immediately killed by the Calusa.
- 1549 Jesuit missionaries led by Xavier arrive in Japan and built a base in Kyushu. Their activity was most successful in Kyushu, with about 100,000 to 200,000 converts, including many daimyōs.
- 1550 – Printed Scriptures are available in 28 languages
- 1551 – Dominican Jerome de Loaysa founds the National University of San Marcos in Lima (Peru) as well as a hospital for indigenous peoples
- 1553 – Portuguese missionaries build a church in Malacca Town, Malaysia
- 1554 – 1,500 converts to Christianity are reported in Siam (now called Thailand)
- 1555 – John Calvin sends Huguenots to Brazil
- 1555 – The first, failed, attempt to set up a Christian mission in Cambodia, by Dominican Gaspar da Cruz.
- 1556 – Gaspar da Cruz spends a month preaching in Guangzhou, China.
- 1557 – Jesuit bishop André de Oviedo arrives in Ethiopia with five priests to convert the local Ethiopian Christians to Catholicism.
- 1558 – The Kabardian duke Saltan Idarov converts to Orthodox Christianity
- 1559 – Missionary Vilela settles in Kyoto, Japan
- 1560 – Gonçalo da Silveira, a Portuguese Jesuit missionary, visited the Munhumutapa Empire, where he rapidly made converts
- 1562 – Diego de Landa burns the libraries of the Maya civilization
- 1563 – Jesuit missionary Luis Frois, who will later write a history of Jesuit activity in Japan, arrives in that country; Ōmura Sumitada becomes the first daimyō (feudal landholder) to convert to Christianity
- 1564 – Legazpi begins Augustinian work in Philippine Islands
- 1565 – Jesuits arrive in Macau.
- 1566 – The first Jesuit to enter what is now the United States, Pedro Martinez, is clubbed to death by fearful Indians on the sands of Fort George Island, Florida
- 1567 – Missionaries Jeronimo da Cruz and Sebastiao da Canto, both Dominicans, arrive at Ayutthaya, Thailand
- 1568 – In the Philippines, Diego de Herrera baptizes Chieftain Tupas of Cebu and his son
- 1569 – Jeronimo da Cruz is murdered along with two newly arrived missionaries
- 1570 – Ignacio Azevedo and 39 other Jesuit missionaries are killed by pirates near Palma, one of the Canary Islands, while on their way to Brazil
- 1571 – Capuchin friars of the 'Strict Observance' arrive on the island of Trinidad with conquistador Don Juan Ponce of Seville.
- 1572 – Jesuits arrive in Mexico
- 1573 – Large-scale evangelization of the Florida Indian nations and tribes begins with the arrival of Franciscan friars; Augustinian order enters Ecuador
- 1574 – Augustinian Guillermo de Santa Maria writes a treatise on the illegitimacy of the war the Spanish government was waging against the Chichimeca in the Mexican state of Michoacán
- 1575 – Church building constructed in Kyoto. Built in Japanese architectural style, it was popularly called the "temple of the South Barbarians"
- 1575 – Spanish Augustinians Martín de Rada and Geronimo Martín spend four months in Fujian, China, trying to arrange for long-term missionary work there. The attempt ends in failure due to unrelated events in the Philippines.
- 1577 – Dominicans enter Mozambique and penetrate inland, burning Muslim mosques as they go
- 1578 – The king of Spain orders the bishop of Lima not to confer Holy Orders on mestizos
- 1579 – Jesuit Alessandro Valignano arrives in Japan where, as "Visitor of Missions", he formulates a basic strategy for Catholic proselytism in that country. Valignano's adaptationism attempted to avoid cultural frictions by covering the gap between certain Japanese customs and Roman Catholic values.
- 1580 – Japanese daimyō (feudal landholder) Arima Harunobu becomes Christian and takes the name Protasio
- 1582 – Jesuits, with Michele Ruggieri and Matteo Ricci as the pioneers, begin mission work in mainland China; introduce Western science, mathematics, astronomy
- 1583 – Five Jesuit missionaries are murdered near Goa (India)
- 1584 – Matteo Ricci and a Chinese scholar translate a catechism into Chinese under the title Tian Zhu Shi Lu (天主實録) (A True Account of God)
- 1585 – Carmelite leader Jerome Gracian meets with Martin Ignatius de Loyola, a Franciscan missionary from China. The two sign a vinculo de hermandad misionera—a bond of missionary brotherhood—by which the two orders would collaborate in missionary work in Ethiopia, China, the Philippines, and the East and West Indies.
- 1586 – Portuguese missionary João dos Santos reports that locals kill elephants to protect their crops in Sofala, Mozambique.
- 1587 – All foreigners ordered out of Japan when the shōgun fears they are as divisive and might present the Europeans with an opportunity to disrupt Japan. They stay but persecution escalates.
- 1587 – Manteo becomes the first American Indian to be baptized by the Church of England
- 1590 – A book by Belgian pastor Hadrian à Saravia has a chapter arguing that the Great Commission is still binding on the church today because the Apostles did not fulfill it completely
- 1591 – First Catholic church built in Trinidad; First Chinese admitted as members of the Jesuit order
- 1593 – The Franciscans arrive in Japan and establish St. Anna's hospital in Kyoto; they dispute with the Jesuits.
- 1594 – First Jesuit missionaries arrive in what is today Pakistan
- 1595 – Dutch East India Company chaplains expand their ministry beyond the European expatriates
- 1596 – Jesuit missionaries travel across the island of Samar in the Philippines to establish mission centers on the eastern side
- 1597 – Twenty-six Japanese Christians are crucified for their faith by General Toyotomi Hideyoshi in Nagasaki, Japan. Full-scale persecution destroys the Christian community by the 1620s. Converts who did not reject Christianity were killed. Many Christians went underground, but their communities died out. Christianity left no permanent imprint on Japanese society.
- 1598 – Spanish missionaries push north from Mexico into what is now the state of New Mexico.
- 1599 – Jesuit Francisco Fernandez goes to what is now the Jessore District of Bangladesh and builds a church there

== 1600 to 1699 ==
- 1600 – French missionaries arrive in the area of what is now Sault Ste. Marie, Michigan
- 1601 – First ordination of Japanese priests
- 1602 – Chinese scientist and translator Xu Guangqi is baptized
- 1603 – The Jesuit Mission Press in Japan commences publication of a Japanese- Portuguese dictionary
- 1604 – Jesuit missionary Abbè Jessè Flèchè arrives at Port Royal, Nova Scotia
- 1605 – Roberto de Nobili goes to India
- 1606 – Japanese shōgun Tokugawa Ieyasu bans Christianity
- 1607 – Missionary Juan Fonte establishes the first Jesuit mission among the Tarahumara in the Sierra Madre Mountains of Northwest Mexico
- 1608 – A missionary expedition into the Ceará area of Brazil fails when the Tacariju kill the Jesuit leader
- 1609 – Missionary Nicolas Trigault goes to China; he will soon (1615) publish Ricci's journals in Europe
- 1610 – Chinese mathematician and astronomer Li Zhizao is baptized
- 1611 – Two Jesuits begin work among Mi'kmaq Indians of Nova Scotia
- 1612 – Jesuits found a mission for the Abenakis in Maine
- 1613 – Missionary Alvarus de Semedo goes to China
- 1614 – Anti-Christian edicts issued in Japan with over 40,000 Christians being massacred
- 1615 – French missionaries in Canada open schools in Trois-Rivières and Tadoussac to teach First Nations children with the hopes of converting them
- 1616 – Nanjing Missionary Case in which the clash between Chinese practice of ancestor worship and Catholic doctrine ends in the deportation of foreign missionaries. Missionary Johann Adam Schall von Bell arrives in China
- 1617 – Portuguese missionary Francisco de Pina arrives in Vietnam
- 1618 – Portuguese Carmelites go from Persia to Pakistan to establish a church in Thatta (near Karachi)
- 1619 – Dominican missionaries found the University of St. Tomas in the Philippine islands
- 1620 – Carmelites enter Goa
- 1621 – The Augustinians establish themselves in Chittagong
- 1622 – Pope Gregory VI founds the Sacred Congregation for the Propagation of the Faith. This becomes the major Papal agency for coordinating and directing missionary work
- 1623 – A stone monument (Xi'an Stele) is unearthed in Xi'an (Si-ngan-fu), China. Its inscription, written by a Syrian monk almost a thousand years earlier and in both Chinese characters and Persian script, begins with the words, "Let us praise the Lord that the [Christian] faith has been popular in China"; it told of the arrival of a missionary, A-lo-pen (Abraham), in AD 625. Alvaro Semedo and other Jesuits soon publicize the stele's discovery in Europe.
- 1624 – Persecution intensifies in Japan with 50 Christians being burned alive in Edo (now called Tokyo)
- 1625 – Vietnam expels missionaries
- 1626 – After entering Japan in disguise, Jesuit missionary Francis Pacheco is captured and executed at Nagasaki
- 1627 – Alexander de Rhodes goes to Vietnam where in three years of ministry he baptizes 6,700 converts
- 1628 – Congregation for the Evangelization of Peoples established in Rome to train "native clergy" from all over the world
- 1629 – Franciscan missionary Alonzo Benavides founds Santa Clara de Capo on the border of Apache Indian country in what is now New Mexico
- 1630 – An attempt is made in the El Paso, Texas area to establish a mission among the Mansos Indians
- 1631 – Dutch clergyman Abraham Rogerius (anglicized as Roger), who authored Open Door to the Secrets of Heathendom (1651), begins 10 years of ministry among the Tamil people in the Dutch colony of Pulicat near Madras, India
- 1632 – Zuni Indians murder a group of Franciscan missionaries who had three years earlier established the first mission to the Zunis at Hawikuh in what is now New Mexico
- 1633 – Emperor Fasilides expels the Jesuit missionaries in Ethiopia; the German Lutheran Church sends Peter Heyling as the first Protestant missionary to Ethiopia.
- 1634 – Jesuit missionary Jean de Brèbeuf travels to the Petun nation (in Canada) and baptizes a 40-year-old man.
- 1635 – An expedition of Franciscans leaves Quito, Ecuador, to try to penetrate into Amazonia from the west. Though most of them will be killed along the way, a few will manage to arrive two years later on the Atlantic coast.
- 1636 – The Dominicans of Manila (the Philippines) organize a missionary expedition to Japan. They are arrested on one of the Okinawa islands and will be eventually condemned to death by the tribunal of Nagasaki.
- 1637 – When smallpox kills thousands of Native Americans, tribal medicine men blame European missionaries for the disaster
- 1638 – Official ban of Christianity in Japan with death penalty; The Fountain Opened, a posthumous work of the influential Puritan writer Richard Sibbes is published, in which he says that the gospel must continue its journey "til it have gone over the whole world."
- 1639 – The first women to New France as missionaries—three Ursuline Nuns—board the "St. Joseph" and set sail for New France
- 1640 – Jesuit missionaries arrive on the Caribbean island of Martinique; Jesuit Lodovico Buglio arrives in Sichuan
- 1641 – Jesuit missionary Cristoval de Acuna describes the Amazon River in a written report to the king of Spain
- 1642 – Catholic missionaries Isaac Jogues and Rene Goupil are captured by Mohawk Indians as they return to Huron country from Quebec. Goupil was tomahawked to death while Jogues will be held for a period of time as a slave. He used his slavery as an opportunity for missionary work
- 1643 – John Campanius, Lutheran missionary to the Indians, arrives in America on the Delaware River; Reformed pastor Johannes Megapolensis begins outreach to Native Americans while pastoring at Albany, New York
- 1644 – John Eliot begins ministry to Algonquian Indians in North America
- 1645 – After thirty years of work in Vietnam, the Jesuits are expelled from that country
- 1646 – After being accused of being a sorcerer, Jesuit missionary Isaac Jogues is killed by the Iroquois
- 1647 – The Discalced Carmelites begin work on Madagascar
- 1648 – Baptism of Helena and other members of the imperial Ming family
- 1649 – Society for the Propagation of the Gospel In New England formed to reach the Indians of New England
- 1650 – The destruction of Huronia by the Iroquois puts an end to the Jesuits' dream of making the Huron Indians the focal point of their evangelism
- 1651 – Count Truchsess of Wetzhausen, prominent Lutheran layman, asks the theological faculty of Wittenberg why Lutherans are not sending out missionaries in obedience to the Great Commission
- 1652 – Jesuit Antonio Vieira returns to Brazil as a missionary where he will champion the cause of exploited indigenous peoples until being expelled by Portuguese colonists
- 1653 – A Mohawk war party captures Jesuit Joseph Poncet near Montreal. He is tortured and will be finally sent back with a message about peace overtures
- 1654 – John Eliot publishes a catechism for American Indians
- 1655 – Jinga or Zinga, princess of Matamba in Angola is converted; later she will write to the Pope urging that more missionaries be sent
- 1656 – First Quaker missionaries arrive in what is now Boston, Massachusetts
- 1657 – Thomas Mayhew, Jr., is lost at sea during a voyage to England that was to combine an appeal for missionary funds with personal business
- 1658 – After the flight of the French missionaries from his area, chief Daniel Garakonthie of the Onondaga Indians, examines the customs of the French colonists and the doctrines of the missionaries and openly begins protecting Christians in his part of what is now New York
- 1659 – Jesuit Alexander de Rhodes establishes the Paris Foreign Missions Society
- 1660 – Christianity is introduced into Cambodia
- 1661 – George Fox, founder of the Religious Society of Friends (Quakers) sends 3 missionaries to China (although they never reached the field)
- 1662 – French Jesuit missionary Julien Garnier sails for Canada
- 1663 – John Eliot's translation of the Bible into one of the Algonquian languages is published (the New Testament came out two years earlier). This Bible was the first complete Bible to be printed in the New World
- 1664 – Justinian von Welz authors three powerful pamphlets on the need for world missions; he will go to Dutch Guinea (now called Surinam) where he will die after only three months
- 1665 – Japanese feudal landholders (called daimyōs) were ordered to follow the shogunate's example and to appoint inquisitors to do a yearly scrutiny of Christians
- 1666 – John Eliot publishes his The Indian Grammar, a book written to assist in conversion work among the Indians. Described as "some bones and ribs preparation for such a work", Eliot intended his Grammar for missionaries wishing to learn the dialect spoken by the Massachusett Indians.
- 1667 – The first missionary to attempt to reach the Huaorani (or Aucas), Jesuit Pedro Suarez, is slain with spears
- 1668 – New Testament translated into the Malay language (the first Bible translation into a language of southeast Asia). - In a letter from his post in Canada, French missionary Jacques Bruyas laments his ignorance of the Oneida language: "What can a man do who does not understand their language, and who is not understood when he speaks. As yet, I do nothing but stammer; nevertheless, in four months I have baptized 60 persons, among whom there are only four adults, baptized in periculo mortis. All the rest are little children."
- 1669 – Eager to compete with the Jesuits for conversion of the Indian Nations on the western Great Lakes, Sulpilcian missionaries François Dollier de Casson and René Bréhant de Galinée set out from Montreal with twenty-seven men in seven canoes led by two canoes of Seneca Indians
- 1670 – Jesuits establish missions on the Orinoco River in Venezuela
- 1671 – Quaker missionaries arrive in the Carolinas
- 1672 – A chieftain on Guam kills Jesuit missionary Diego Luis de San Vitores and his Visayan assistant, Pedro Calungsod, for having baptized the chief's daughter without his permission (some accounts do say the girl's mother consented to the baptism)
- 1673 – French trader Louis Jolliet and missionary Jacques Marquette visit what is now the state of Illinois, where the latter establishes a mission for Native Americans
- 1674 – Vincentian mission to Madagascar collapses after 25 years of abortive effort
- 1675 – An uprising on the islands of Micronesia leads to the death of three Christian missionaries
- 1676 – Kateri Tekakwitha, who became known as the Lily of the Mohawks, is baptized by a Jesuit missionary. She, along with many other Native Americans, joins a missionary settlement in Canada where a syncretistic blend of ascetic indigenous and Catholic beliefs evolves.
- 1678 – French missionaries Jean La Salle and Louis Hennepin discover Niagara Falls
- 1679 – Writing from Changzhou, newly arrived missionary Juan de Yrigoyen describes three Christian congregations flourishing in that Chinese city
- 1680 – The Pueblo Revolt begins in New Mexico with the killing of twenty-one Franciscan missionaries
- 1681 – After arriving in New Spain, Italian Jesuit Eusebio Kino soon becomes what one writer described as "the most picturesque missionary pioneer of all North America." A bundle of evangelistic zeal, Kino was also an explorer, astronomer, cartographer, mission builder, ranchman, cattle king, and defender of the frontier
- 1682 – 13 missionaries go to "remote cities" in East Siberia
- 1683 – Missionary Louis Hennepin returns to France after exploring Minnesota and being held captive by the Dakota to write the first book about Minnesota, Description de la Louisiane
- 1684 – Louis XIV of France sends Jesuit missionaries to China bearing gifts from the collections of the Louvre and the Palace of Versailles
- 1685 – Consecration of first Catholic bishop of Chinese origin
- 1686 – Russian Orthodox monks arrive in China as missionaries
- 1687 – St Joseph Vaz arrives in Sri Lanka where he revives Catholicism after persecution from the Dutch
- 1687 – French activity begins in what is now Ivory Coast when missionaries land at Assinie
- 1689 – Calusa Indian chief from what is the state of Florida visits Cuba to discuss idea of having missionaries come to his people
- 1690 – First Franciscan missionaries arrive in Texas
- 1691 – Christian Faith Society for the West Indies was organized with a focus on evangelizing African slaves
- 1692 – Chinese Kangxi Emperor permits the Jesuits to freely preach Christianity, converting whom they wish
- 1693 – Jesuit missionary John de Britto is publicly beheaded in India
- 1694 – Missionary and explorer Eusebio Kino becomes the first European to enter the Tucson, Arizona basin and create a lasting settlement
- 1695 – China's first Russian Orthodox church building is consecrated
- 1696 – Jesuit missionary Francois Pinet founds the Mission of the Guardian Angel near what is today Chicago. The mission was abandoned in 1700 when missionary efforts seemed fruitless
- 1697 – To evangelize the English colonies, Thomas Bray, an Anglican preacher who made several missionary trips to North America, begins laying the groundwork for what will be the Society for the Propagation of the Gospel in Foreign Parts
- 1698 – Society for Promoting Christian Knowledge organized by Anglicans
- 1699 – Priests of the Quebec Seminary of Foreign Missions establish a mission among the Tamaroa Indians at Cahokia in what is now the state of Illinois

== 1700 to 1799 ==
- 1700 – After a Swedish missionary's sermon in Pennsylvania, one Native American posed such searching questions that the episode was reported in a 1731 history of the Swedish church in America. The interchange is noted in Benjamin Franklin's Remarks Concerning the Savages of North America (1784).
- 1701 – Society for the Propagation of the Gospel in Foreign Parts officially organized
- 1702 – George Keith, returns to America as a missionary of the newly organized Society for the Propagation of the Gospel in Foreign Parts
- 1703 – The Society for the Propagation of the Gospel in Foreign Parts expands to the West Indies
- 1704 – French missionary priests arrive to evangelize the Chitimacha living along the Mississippi River in what is now the state of Louisiana
- 1706 – Bartholomäus Ziegenbalg, German missionary, arrives in Tranquebar
- 1706 – Irish-born Francis Makemie, who has been an itinerant Presbyterian missionary among the colonists of America since 1683, is finally able to organize the first American presbytery
- 1707 – Italian Capuchin missionaries reach Kathmandu in Nepal. Maillard de Tournon makes public, in Nanjing, the Vatican decisions on rites, including the stipulations against the veneration of ancestors and of Confucius.
- 1708 – Jesuit missionary Giovanni Battista Sidotti is arrested in Japan. He is taken to Edo (now called Tokyo) to be interrogated by Arai Hakuseki
- 1709 – Experience Mayhew, missionary to the Martha's Vineyard Indians, translates the Psalms and the Gospel of John into the Massachusett language. It will be a work considered second only to John Eliot's Indian Bible in terms of significant Indian-language translations in colonial New England
- 1710 – First modern Bible Society founded in Germany by Count Canstein
- 1711 – Jesuit Eusebio Kino, missionary explorer in southern Arizona and northern Sonora, dies suddenly in northern Mexico. Kino, who has been called "the cowboy missionary", had fought against the exploitation of Indians in Mexican silver mines.
- 1712 – Using a press sent by The Society for Promoting Christian Knowledge, the Tranquebar Mission in India begins printing books in the Portuguese language
- 1713 – Jesuit Ippolito Desideri goes to Tibet as a missionary
- 1714 – New Testament translated into Tamil (India); the Royal Danish College of Missions is organized in Copenhagen
- 1715 – Eastern Orthodox Church missionary outreach is renewed in Manchuria and Northern China
- 1718 – The establishment of the Alamo Mission in San Antonio is authorized by the viceroy of Mexico. The mission was to be an educational center for Native Americans who converted to Christianity.
- 1717 – Chen Mao writes to the Chinese Emperor about his concerns over Catholic missionaries and Western traders. He urgently requested an all-out prohibition of Catholic missionaries in the Qing provinces.
- 1718 – Bartholomäus Ziegenbalg constructs a church building in India that is still in use today
- 1719 – Isaac Watts writes missionary hymn Jesus Shall Reign Where'er the Sun
- 1720 – Missionary Johann Ernst Gruendler dies in India. He had arrived there in 1709 with the sponsorship of the Danish Mission Society
- 1721 – Mission San Juan Bautista Malibat in Baja California is abandoned due to the hostility of the Cochimi Indians, as well as to the decimation of the local population by epidemics and a water shortage. Chinese Kangxi Emperor bans Christian missionaries as a result of the Chinese Rites controversy. Hans Egede goes to Greenland under the dual auspices of the Royal Mission College and the Bergen Company.
- 1723 – Robert Millar publishes A History of the Propagation of Christianity and the Overthrow of Paganism advocating prayer as the primary means of converting non-Christians
- 1724 – Yongzheng Emperor bans missionary activities outside the Beijing area
- 1725 – Knud Leem arrives as a missionary to the Sami people of Finnmark (Norwegian Arctic)
- 1726 – John Wright, a Quaker missionary to the Native Americans, settles in southeastern Pennsylvania
- 1728 – Institutum Judaicum founded in Halle as first Protestant mission center for Jewish evangelism
- 1729 – Roman Catholic missionary Du Poisson becomes the first victim in the Natchez revolt. On his way to New Orleans, he had been asked to stop and say Mass at the Natchez post. He was killed in front of the altar.
- 1730 – Lombard, French missionary, founds a Christian village with over 600 Indians at the mouth of Kuru river in French Guiana. A Jesuit, Lombard has been called the most successful of all missionaries in converting the Indians of French Guiana
- 1731 – A missionary movement is born when Count Nicolaus Ludwig Zinzendorf attends the coronation of King Christian VI of Denmark and witnesses two of Egede's Inuit converts. Over the next two years, his Moravian Church at Herrnhut will begin its missionary outreach with work among the slaves in the Caribbean and the Inuit in Greenland.
- 1732 – Alphonsus Liguori founds the Roman Catholic religious institute known as the Redemptorist Fathers with the purpose of doing missionary work among rural people
- 1733 – Moravians establish their first mission in Greenland
- 1734 – A missionary convinces a Groton, Connecticut church to lend its building to the Mashantucket Pequot Tribe for Christian worship services.
- 1735 – John Wesley goes to Indians in Georgia as missionary with the Society for the Propagation of the Gospel in Foreign Parts
- 1736 – Anti-Christian edicts in China; Moravian missionaries at work among Nenets people of Arkhangelsk
- 1737 – Rev. Pugh, a missionary in Pennsylvania with The Society for the Propagation of the Gospel in Foreign Parts begins ministering to blacks. He noted that the masters of the slaves were prejudiced against them becoming Christian.
- 1738 – Moravian missionary George Schmidt settles in Baviaan Kloof (Valley of the Baboons) in the Riviersonderend valley of South Africa. He begins working with the Khoikhoi people, who were practically on the threshold of extinction.
- 1739 – The first missionary to the Mahican (Mohegan) Indians, John Sergeant, builds a home in Stockbridge, Massachusetts that is today a museum.
- 1740 – Moravian David Zeisberger starts work among Creek people of Georgia
- 1740 – Johann Phillip Fabricius, missionary, arrives in South India
- 1741 – Dutch missionaries start building Christ Church building in Malacca Town, Malaysia. It will take 12 years to complete.
- 1742 – Moravian Leader Count Zinzendorf visits Shekomeko, New York and baptizes six Indians
- 1743 – David Brainerd starts ministry to North American Indians
- 1744 – Thomas Thompson resigns his position as dean at the University of Cambridge to become a missionary. He was sent by the Society for the Propagation of the Gospel in Foreign Parts to New Jersey. Taking a special interest in the slave population there, he would later request to begin mission work in Africa. In 1751, Thompson would become the first S.P.G. missionary to the Gold Coast (modern-day Ghana)
- 1745 – David Brainerd, after preaching to Native Americans in December, wrote about the response: "They soon came in, one after another; with tears in their eyes, to know, what they should do to be saved. . . . It was an amazing season of power among them, and seemed as if God had bowed the heavens and come down ... and that God was about to convert the whole world."
- 1746 – From Boston a call is issued to the Christians of the New World to enter into a seven-year "Concert of Prayer" for missionary work
- 1747 – Jonathan Edwards appeals for prayer for world missions
- 1748 – Roman Catholic Pedro Sanz and four other missionaries are executed, together with 14 Chinese Christians. Prior to his death, Sanz reportedly converted some of his prison guards to Christianity.
- 1749 – Spanish Franciscan priest Junípero Serra (1713-1784 arrives in Mexico as a missionary. In 1767 he would go north to what is now California, zealously building missions and converting Native Americans.
- 1750 – Jonathan Edwards, preacher of the First Great Awakening, having been banished from his church at Northampton, Massachusetts goes as a missionary to the nearby Housatonic Indians. Christian Frederic Schwartz goes to India with Danish-Halle Mission
- 1751 – Samuel Cooke arrives in New Jersey as a missionary for the SPGFP
- 1752 – Thomas Thompson, first Anglican missionary to Africa, arrives in the Gold Coast (now Ghana)
- 1753 – The disappearance of Erhardt and six companions leads to temporary abandonment of Moravian missionary initiatives in Labrador.
- 1754 – Moravian John Ettwein arrives in America from Germany as a missionary. Preaching to Native Americans and establishing missions, Ettwein will travel as far south as Georgia.
- 1755 – The Moravian mission settlement at Gnadenhütten, Pennsylvania is attacked and destroyed during the Gnadenhütten massacre. Moravian missionary Johann Jacob Schmick remains with the Mahicans through exile and captivity despite almost constant threats from white neighbors. Schmick will join his Indian congregation as they seek refuge in Bethlehem, follow them as captives to Philadelphia, and remain with them after they settle in Wyalusing, Pennsylvania.
- 1756 – Civil unrest forces Gideon Halley away from his missionary work among the Six Nations on the Susquehanna River where he has been working for four years under the supervision of Jonathan Edwards with an appointment from the Society for Propagating the Gospel among the Indians.
- 1757 – Lutherans begin ministering to Blacks in the Caribbean
- 1758 – John Wesley baptizes two slaves, thus breaking the skin color barrier for Methodist societies
- 1759 – Native American Samson Occom, direct descendant of the great Mahican chief Uncas, is ordained by the Presbyterians. Occom became the first American Indian to publish works in English. These included sermons, hymns and a short autobiography.
- 1760 – Adam Voelker and Christian Butler arrive in Tranquebar as the first Moravian missionaries to India
- 1760 – Methodists first reach the West Indies.
- 1761 – The first Moravian missionary in Ohio, Frederick Post, settles on the north side of the Muskingum.
- 1762 – Moravian Missionary John Heckewelder confers with Koquethagacton ("White Eyes") at the mouth of the Beaver River (Pennsylvania)
- 1763 – The Presbyterian Synod of New York orders that a collection for missions be taken. In 1767 the Synod asks that this collection be done annually.
- 1764 – The Moravians make a decision to expand and begin publicizing their missionary activity, particularly in the British colonies; Moravian Jens Haven makes the first of three exploratory missionary journeys to Greenland
- 1765 – Suriname Governor General Crommelin convinces three Moravian missionaries to work near the head waters of the Gran Rio. They settle among the Saramaka near the Senthea Creek in Granman Abini's village where they are received with mixed feelings.
- 1766 – Philip Quaque, a Fetu youth from the Cape Coast area of Ghana who spent twelve years studying in England, returns to Africa. Supported as a missionary by the Society for the Propagation of the Gospel in Foreign Parts, Quaque is first non-European ordained priest in the Church of England
- 1767 – Spain expels the Jesuits from Spanish colonies in the New World
- 1768 – Five United Brethren missionaries from Germany, invited by the Danish Guinea Company, arrive in the Gold Coast (now Ghana), to teach in the Cape Coast Castle schools
- 1769 – Junípero Serra founds Mission San Diego de Alcalá, first of the 21 Alta California missions
- 1770 – John Marrant, a free black from New York City, begins ministering cross-culturally, preaching to the American Indians. By 1775 he had carried the gospel to the Cherokee and Creek Indians as well as to groups he called the Catawar and Housaw peoples.
- 1771 – Methodist Francis Asbury arrives in America; David Avery is ordained as missionary to the Oneida tribe
- 1772 – After visiting Scilly Cove in Newfoundland, Canada, missionary James Balfour describes it as a "most Barbarous Lawless Place"
- 1773 – Pope Clement XIV dissolves the Jesuit Order; two Dominican order missionaries beheaded in Vietnam
- 1775 – John Crook is sent by Liverpool Methodists to the Isle of Man
- 1776 – Cyril Vasilyevich Suchanov builds first church among Evenks of Transbaikal (or Dauria) in (Siberia); The first baptism of an Eskimo by a Lutheran pastor takes place in Labrador.
- 1777 – Portuguese missionaries build a church at Hashnabad, Bangladesh
- 1778 – Theodore Sladich is martyred while doing missionary work to counter Islamic influence in the western Balkans
- 1780 – August Gottlieb Spangenberg writes An Account of the Manner in Which the Protestant Church of the Unitas Fratrum, or United Brethren, Preach the Gospel, and Carry On Their Missions Among the Heathen. Originally written in German, the book will be translated into English in 1788.
- 1781 – In the midst of the American Revolutionary War, the British so feared Moravian missionary David Zeisberger and his influence among the Lenape (also called Delaware) and other Native Americans that they arrested him and his assistant, John Heckewelder, charging them with treason
- 1782 – Freed slave George Lisle goes to Jamaica as missionary
- 1783 – Moses Baker and George Gibbions, both former slaves, leave the U.S. to become missionaries in the West Indies
- 1784 – First Christians reported in Korea; Yi Seung-hun back home in Korea after being baptized in China
- 1784 – Thomas Coke (Methodist) submits his Plan for the Society for the Establishment of Missions Among the Heathen. Methodist missions among the "heathen" will begin in 1786 when Coke, destined for Nova Scotia, is driven off course by a storm and lands at Antigua in the British West Indies.
- 1785 – Joseph White's sermon titled "On the Duty of Attempting the Propagation of the Gospel among our Mahometan and Gentoo Subjects in India" is published in the second edition of his book Sermons Containing a View of Christianity and Mahometanism, in their History, their Evidence, and their Effects. The sermon was first preached at the University of Oxford.
- 1786 – John Marrant, a free black from New York City, writes in his journal that he preached to "a great number of Indians and white people" at Green's Harbor, Newfoundland. Marrant's cross-cultural ministry led him to take the Gospel to the Cherokee, Creek, Catawba (he called them the Catawar, and Housaw Indians).
- 1787 – William Carey is ordained in England by the Particular Baptists and soon begins to urge that worldwide missions be undertaken.
- 1788 – Dutch missionaries begin preaching the Gospel among fishermen in Bangladesh
- 1788 – Rev Richard Johnson the first Christian cleric in Australia
- 1789 – The Jesuits establish Georgetown University as the first US Catholic college
- 1790 – Prince Williams, a freed slave from South Carolina, goes to Nassau, Bahamas, where he will start Bethel Meeting House
- 1791 – One hundred and twenty Korean Christians are tortured and killed for their faith. It began when Paul Yun Ji-Chung, a noble who had become a Christian, decided not to bury his mother according to traditional Confucian custom.
- 1792 – William Carey writes An Enquiry into the Obligations of Christians to use means for the conversion of the heathen and forms the Baptist Missionary Society to support him in establishing missionary work in India
- 1793 – Stephen Badin ordained in U.S. Although much of Badin's ministry was pastoral work among his own countrymen, he did some outreach among the Potawatomi Indians
- 1794 – Eight Russian Orthodox missionaries arrive on Kodiak Island in Alaska. Within a few months several thousand people have been baptized
- 1794 – Roman Catholic missionary Zhou Wenmo enters Korea
- 1795 – Roman Catholic missionary Zhou Wenmo celebrates the first mass in Korea at Easter
- 1795 – The London Missionary Society is formed to send missionaries to Tahiti
- 1796 – Scottish and Glasgow Missionary Societies established; In India, Johann Philipp Fabricius' translation of the Bible into Tamil is revised and published
- 1797 – Netherlands Missionary Society formed; The Duff, carrying 36 lay and pastoral missionaries, sails to three islands of the South Pacific; The first Christian missionary (from the London Missionary Society) visits Hiva on the Pacific island of Tahuata; he is not well received.
- 1798 – The Missionary Society of Connecticut is organized by the Congregationalists to take the gospel to the "heathen lands" of Vermont and Ohio. Its missionaries evangelized both European settlers and Native Americans.
- 1799 – The Church Missionary Society is formed by the Clapham Sect in South London, England; John Vanderkemp, Dutch physician goes to Cape Colony, Africa

== 1800 to 1849 ==
- 1800 – New York Missionary Society formed; Johann Janicke founds a school in Berlin to train young people for missionary service.
- 1800 – Irish priests including Fr James Dixon arrive in Australia as convicts.
- 1801 – John Theodosius van der Kemp moves to Graaff Reinet to minister to the Khoikhoi (Hottentots) people. Earlier he had helped found the Netherlands Missionary Society. In 1798, he had gone to South Africa to work as a missionary among the Xhosa.
- 1802 – Henry Martyn hears Charles Simeon speak of William Carey's work in India and resolves to become a missionary himself. He will sail for India in 1805.
- 1803 – The Massachusetts Baptist Missionary Society votes to publish a missionary magazine. Now known as The American Baptist, the periodical is the oldest religious magazine in the U.S.
- 1804 – British and Foreign Bible Society formed; Church Missionary Society enters Sierra Leone, sending 4 German Lutherans.
- 1805 – The first Christian missionaries arrive in Namibia, brothers Abraham and Christian Albrecht from the London Missionary Society.
- 1806 – Haystack Prayer Meeting at Williams College; Andover Theological Seminary founded as a missionary training center; Protestant missionary work begins in earnest across southern Africa.
- 1807 – Robert Morrison, of the London Missionary Society established a mission in Guangzhou (Canton) in China.
- 1809 – The Church's Ministry among Jewish People is established by Joseph Frey, William Wilberforce, and Lewis Way.
- 1810 – The American Board of Commissioners for Foreign Missions (ABCFM) is established.
- 1811 – English Wesleyans enter Sierra Leone.
- 1812 – First ABCFM foreign missionaries, Adoniram Judson and Luther Rice, arrive in Serampore, with Judson soon going to Burma.
- 1813 – The Methodists form the Wesleyan Missionary Society.
- 1814 – First recorded baptism of a mainland Chinese Protestant convert, Cai Gao; American Baptist Foreign Mission Society formed; Netherlands Bible Society founded; Samuel Marsden officiated at the first service on Christmas Day to begin the Church Missionary Society work in New Zealand.
- 1815 – Congregationalist minister Cyrus Kingsbury first served Cherokee in the Southeast, founding Brainerd Mission near Chickamauga, Tennessee, in 1815.
- 1815 – American Board of Commissioners for Foreign Missions open work on Ceylon, modern-day Sri Lanka through American Ceylon Mission; Basel Missionary Society organized; Richmond African Missionary Society founded
- 1816 – Robert Moffat arrives in Africa; American Bible Society founded; Charlotte White, a Baptist, arrives in India, the first single American woman to become a missionary.
- 1816 – Barnabas Shaw opens the first Wesleyan mission in South Africa: Liliefontein, in the Khamiesberg Mountains (Namaqualand), among the Khoisan peoples in the northern Cape Colony.
- 1817 – James Thompson, agent for British and Foreign Bible Society, begins distributing Bibles throughout Latin America.
- 1818 – Missionary work begins in Madagascar with the reluctant approval of the king.
- 1819 – John Scudder, Sr., missionary physician, joins the American Ceylon Mission; Wesleyan Methodists start work in Madras, India; Reginald Heber writes words to missionary classic "From Greenland's Icy Mountains". Alfred Wright (1788-1853) becomes a Presbyterian missionary to Choctaw Nation.
- 1820 – Cyrus Kingsbury is sent in 1820 to establish Mayhew Mission in Choctaw Nation (present-day U.S. State of Mississippi.
- 1820 – Hiram Bingham goes to Hawaii (Sandwich Islands).
- 1821 – African-American Lott Carey, a Baptist missionary, sails with 28 colleagues from Norfolk, VA to Sierra Leone; Protestant Episcopal Church mission board established.
- 1821 – Dwight Presbyterian Mission established in August by Cephas Washburn near present-day Russellville, Arkansas to minister to the Cherokees then living in Arkansas Territory.
- 1822 – African American Betsy Stockton is sent by the American Board of Missions to Hawaii. She thus becomes the first single woman missionary appointed by the American Board.
- 1823 – Scottish Missionary Society workers arrive in Bombay, India; Liang Fa, first Chinese Protestant evangelist, is ordained by Robert Morrison; Colonial and Continental Church Society formed
- 1824 – Berlin Missionary Society formed.
- 1825 – George Boardman goes to Burma. Congregationalist missionary Samuel Worcester sent to Brainerd Mission in Tennessee as minister to Cherokees.
- 1826 – American Bible Society sends first shipment of Bibles to Mexico.
- 1827 – Missionary Lancelot Edward Threlkeld reports in The Monitor that he was "advancing rapidly" in his efforts to disseminate Holy Scripture among Indigenous Australians of the Hunter and Shoalhaven Rivers.
- 1828 – Pope Leo XII entrusts the mission in Korea to Paris Foreign Missions Society.
- 1828 – Basel Mission begins work in the Christiansborg area of Accra, Ghana; Karl Gützlaff of the Netherlands Missionary Society lands in Bangkok, Thailand; Rhenish Missionary Society formed
- 1829 – George Müller, a native of Prussia, goes to England as a missionary to the Jews; Anthony Norris Groves, an Exeter dentist, sets off as a missionary to Baghdad accompanied by John Kitto.
- 1829 – Dwight Presbyterian Mission moves to Indian Territory after most Cherokees are expelled from homes in southeastern U. S. states in 1828.
- 1830 – Church of Scotland missionary Alexander Duff arrives in Kolkata (formerly Calcutta); William Swan, missionary to Siberia, writes Letters on Missions, the first Protestant comprehensive treatment of the theory and practice of missions; Baptism of Tāufaʻāhau I, King of Tonga, by a western missionary; arrival of John Williams of the London Missionary Society in Samoa, landing in Sapapaliʻi on Savaiʻi island. Dwight Presbyterian Mission reopens near Sallisaw in Indian Territory to serve Cherokees forced to move west on the Trail of Tears.
- 1831 – American Congregational missionaries arrive in Thailand, withdrawing in 1849 without a single convert; four Native Americans from beyond the Rocky Mountains come east to St. Louis, Missouri seeking information on the "palefaces' religion".
- 1832 – Teava, former cannibal and pioneer Pacific Islander missionary, is commissioned by John Williams to work on the Samoan island of Manono.
- 1832 – Rev. Loring S. Williams established mission station Bethabara and organized the first church in the Choctaw Nation in Indian Territory (present-day Eagletown, McCurtain County, Oklahoma).
- 1832 – Alfred Wright, a medically trained Presbyterian minister was sent to Mississippi with his wife, Harriet Bunce to minister in the Choctaw nation. After traveling with a group of Choctaws on their forced emigration to Indian Territory in 1832, they decided to establish a new mission near present-day Eagletown, Oklahoma. From then until 1846, they built and operated a church and a school to minister to Choctaws living in the surrounding area. Wright named the mission Wheelock, in honor of Eleazar Wheelock, a friend and first president of Dartmouth College. Meanwhile, ignoring his own frail health, Alfred spent as much time as he could translating religious documents from English into the Choctaw language until his death in 1853.
- 1833 – Baptist work in Thailand begins with John Taylor Jones; the first American Methodist missionary, Melville Beveridge Cox, goes to Liberia where he dies within four months. His dying appeal was: "Let a thousand fall before Africa be given up"; Free Will Baptist Foreign Missionary Society begins work in India. George Borrow arrives in Russia as an agent of the British & Foreign Bible Society.
- 1834 – American Presbyterian Mission opens work in India in the Punjab; Peter Parker MD, associated with the American Board of Commissioners for Foreign Missions, first American Medical Missionary to China opens Ophthalmic Hospital at Canton.
- 1835 – Rev. Cyrus Byington arrived at Bethabara Mission in 1835. established Stockbridge Mission, and spent 31 years translating both religious and secular materials, using a Choctaw-English dictionary that he had created. Byington also established Stockbridge Mission on the opposite side of the Mountain Fork River from Bethabara.
- 1835 – Rhenish Missionary Society begins work among the Dayaks on Borneo (Indonesia); Daniel Wilson, Bishop of Calcutta calls India's caste system "a cancer."
- 1835 – Barthélemy Bruguière sicks and dies in China before he reach Korea. George Borrow arrives in Spain as an agent of the Bible Society.
- 1836 – Pierre Maubant arrives in Korea; Paris Foreign Missions Society start work in Korea.
- 1836 – Plymouth Brethren begin work in Madras, India; George Müller begins his work with orphans in Bristol, England; Gossner Mission formed; Leipzig Mission Society established; Colonial Missionary Society formed; The Providence Missionary Baptist District Association is formed, one of at least six national organizations among African American Baptists whose sole objective was missionary work in Africa.
- 1837 – Laurent-Joseph-Marius Imbert arrives in Korea.
- 1837 – Evangelical Lutheran Church mission board established; First translation of Bible into Japanese (actual translation work done in Singapore).
- 1838 – Church of Scotland Mission of Inquiry to the Jews; four Scottish ministers including Robert Murray M'Cheyne and Andrew Bonar journey to Palestine; Augustinians enter Australia.
- 1839 – Entire Bible is published in language of Tahiti; three French missionaries martyred in Korea; English Protestant missionaries, including John Williams, murdered on Erromango (Vanuatu, South Pacific).
- 1840 – David Livingstone is in present-day Malawi (Africa) with the London Missionary Society; American Presbyterians enter Thailand and labor for 18 years before seeing their first Thai convert; Irish Presbyterian Missionary Society formed; Welsh Calvinistic Methodist Missionary Society founded.
- 1841 – Edinburgh Medical Missionary Society formed; Welsh Methodists begin working among the Khasi people of India.
- 1842 – Methodist Missionary, Thomas Birch Freeman arrives in Badagry, Nigeria.
- 1842 – Church Missionary Society enters Badagry, Lagos.
- 1842 – Gossner Mission Society receives royal sanction; Norwegian Missionary Society formed in Stavanger.
- 1842 – Christian Mission to the Jews (CMJ) establishes Christ Church, first Anglican church in the Old City of Jerusalem.
- 1843 – Baptist John Taylor Jones translates New Testament into the Thai language; British Society for the Propagation of the Gospel among the Jews formed.
- 1843 - Presbyterian missionary Robert M. Loughridge comes to Indian Territory (present-day Oklahoma as missionary to Creek Indians and establishes Koweta Mission. In 1850, he establishes Tullahassee Mission. Both missions were abandoned after the outbreak of the American Civil War.
- 1843 - Twenty-four West Indian Moravians recruited by the Basel Mission and the Danish missionary, Andreas Riis, sail to the Gold Coast, now Ghana to start mission work
- 1844 – German Johann Krapf of the Church Missionary Society begins work in Mombasa on the Kenya Coast; first Young Men's Christian Association (YMCA) formed by George Williams; George Smith and Thomas McClatchie sail for China as the first two CMS missionaries to that country.
- 1844 Hans Paludan Smith Schreuder, missionary, arrives in Port Natal, South Africa.
- 1845 – Southern Baptist Convention mission organization founded.
- 1846 – The London Missionary Society establishes work on Niue, a South Pacific island which westerners had named the "savage island".
- 1847 – Protestant Rhenish Missionary Society begins operations in China.
- 1847 – Presbyterian William Burns goes to China, translates The Pilgrim's Progress into Chinese; Moses White sails to China as a Methodist medical missionary.
- 1847 – John Christian Frederick Heyer, missionary, arrives in Andhra Pradesh, India.
- 1848 – Charles Forman goes to Punjab; Johannes Rebmann, German missionary with the Church Missionary Society, arrives at Mount Kilimanjaro. Initially, the story of a snow-covered peak near the equator was scoffed at.
- 1849 – Johann Krapf of the Church Missionary Society was the first European to reach Mount Kenya. Just weeks after arriving on the Melanesian island of Anatom, missionary John Geddie wrote in his journal: "In the darkness, degradation, pollution and misery that surrounds me, I will look forward in the vision of faith to the time when some of these poor islanders will unite in the triumphant song of ransomed souls, 'Unto Him that loved us, and washed us from our sins in His own blood.'"

== 1850 to 1899 ==
- 1850 – On the occasion of Karl Gützlaff's visit to Europe, the Berlin Ladies Association for China is established in conjunction with the Berlin Missionary Association for China. Work in China will commence in 1851 with the arrival of Hermandine Neumann in Hong Kong. Rev. Thomas Valpy French, came to India in 1850, founded St. John's College, Agra, and became first Bishop of Lahore in 1877.
- 1851 – Allen Gardiner and six missionary colleagues die of exposure and starvation at Patagonia on the southern tip of South America because a re-supply ship from England arrives six months late.
- 1852 – Zenana (women) and Medical Missionary Fellowship formed in England to send out single women missionaries
- 1853- The Hermannsburg Missionary Society, founded in 1849 by Louis Harms, has finished training its first group of young missionaries. They are sent to Africa on a ship (the Candace) which had been built using money entirely from donations.
- 1854 – New York Missionary Conference, guided by Alexander Duff, ponders the question: "To what extent are we authorized by the Word of God to expect the conversion of the world to Christ?"; Henry Venn, secretary of the Church Missionary Society, sets out ideal of self-governing, self-supporting and self-propagating churches; Hudson Taylor arrives in China
- 1855 – Henry Steinhauer is ordained as a Canadian Methodist missionary to North American Indians and posted to Lac La Biche, Alberta. Steinhauer's missionary work had actually begun 15 years earlier in 1840 when he was assigned to Lac La Pluie to assist in translating, teaching and interpreting the Ojibwa and Cree languages.
- 1856 – Presbyterians start work in Colombia with the arrival of Henry Pratt
- 1856 – Siméon-François Berneux arrives in Korea
- 1857 – Bible translated into Tswana language; Board of Foreign Missions of Dutch Reformed Church set up; four missionary couples killed at the Fatehgarh mission during the Indian Mutiny of 1857; Publication of David Livingstone's book Missionary Travels and Researches in South Africa
- 1858 – John G. Paton begins work in New Hebrides; Basel Evangelical Missionary Society begins work in western Sumatra (Indonesia)
- 1859 – Presbyterian minister Rev. Ashbel Green Simonton arrives in Rio de Janeiro.
- 1859 – Protestant missionaries arrive in Japan; Revivals in North America and the British Isles generate interest in overseas missions; Albert Benjamin Simpson (founder of Christian and Missionary Alliance) is converted by the revival ministry of Henry Grattan Guinness
- 1860 – British Syrian Schools Association (forerunner to MECO and SIM) set up by Elizabeth Bowen Thompson
- 1861 – Protestant Stundism arises in the village of Osnova of modern-day Ukraine; Sarah Doremus founds the Women's Union Missionary Society; Episcopal Church opens work in Haiti; Rhenish Mission goes to Indonesia under Ludwig Nommensen
- 1862 – Paris Evangelical Missionary Society opens work in Senegal; the first dictionary of the Samoan language published, written by Rev George Pratt of the London Missionary Society.
- 1863 – Robert Moffat, missionary to Africa with the London Missionary Society, publishes his book Rivers of Water in a Dry Place, Being an Account of the Introduction of Christianity into South Africa, and of Mr. Moffat's Missionary Labours
- 1865 – The China Inland Mission is founded by James Hudson Taylor; James Laidlaw Maxwell plants first viable church in Taiwan. Salvation Army founded in London by William Booth. Van Dyck Bible (in Arabic) completed.
- 1865 – Ernst Faber arrives in China.
- 1865. Henry Venn (1796-1873) of the Church Missionary Society called for "three-self" native churches: self-supporting, self-governing, and self-propagating.
- 1866 – Charles Haddon Spurgeon invents the Wordless Book, which is widely used in cross-cultural evangelism; Theodore Jonas Meyer (1819–1894), a converted Jew serving as a Presbyterian missionary in Italy, nurses those dying in a cholera epidemic until he himself falls prey to the disease. Barely surviving, he becomes a peacemaker between Catholics and Protestants; Robert Thomas, known as the first Protestant martyr in Korea, is beaten to death by locals after getting involved in kidnapping, shooting & killing locals in Pyongyang, Korea
- 1867 – Methodists start work in Argentina; Scripture Union established; Lars Olsen Skrefsrud and Hans Peter Børresen begin working among the Santals of India.
- 1868 – Robert Bruce goes to Iran, Canadian Baptist missionary Americus Timpany begins work among the Telugu people in India.
- 1869 – The first Methodist women's missionary magazine, The Heathen Women's Friend, begins publication. Riot in Yangzhou, China destroys China Inland Mission house and nearly leads to open war between Britain and China.
- 1870 – Clara Swain, the very first female missionary medical doctor, arrives at Bareilly, India; Orthodox Missionary Society founded
- 1871 – William Sloan went to Faeroe Islands commended from a brethren assembly
- 1871 – Henry Stanley finds David Livingstone in central Africa
- 1872 – First All-India Missionary Conference with 136 participants; George Leslie Mackay plants church in northern Taiwan; Lottie Moon appointed as missionary to China
- 1873 – Regions Beyond Missionary Union founded in London in connection with the East London Training Institute for Home and Foreign Missions; first Scripture portion (Gospel of Luke) translated into Pangasinan, a language of the Philippines, by Alfonso Lallave
- 1874 – Gustav Warneck founded the Allgemeine Missions Zeitschrift in Gütersloh / Germany, the first scientific missionary periodical; Lord Radstock's first visit to St. Petersburg, Russia, and the beginning of an evangelical awakening among the St. Petersburg nobility; Albert Sturges initiates the Interior Micronesia Mission in the Mortlock Islands under the leadership of Micronesian students from Ohwa
- 1875 – The Foreign Christian Missionary Society organized within the Christian Church (Disciples of Christ) and Church of Christ movements; Clah, a Canadian Indian convert, brought Christianity to natives at Ft. Wangel, Alaska. He assumed the name of Philip McKay.
- 1875 - The Society of the Divine Word, a Roman Catholic missionary community, is founded by Arnold Jannsen in Steyl, Holland.
- 1876 – In September, a rusty ocean steamer arrives at a port on the Calabar River in what is now Nigeria. That part of Africa was then known as the White Man's Grave. The only woman on board that ship is 29-year-old Mary Slessor, a missionary.
- 1877 – James Chalmers goes to New Guinea; Presbyterians Sheldon Jackson and missionary-widow Amanda McFarland arrive at Ft. Wrangel, Alaska where they join Philip McKay (né Clah) to start missionary work. McFarland was the first white woman in Alaska, and renowned as "Alaska's Courageous Missionary." China Inland Mission opens up settled mission work in Sichuan.
- 1878 – Mass movement to Christ begins in Ongole, India
- 1880 – Woman missionary doctor Fanny Butler goes to India; Missionary periodical The Gospel in All Lands is launched by A. B. Simpson; Justus Henry Nelson and Fannie Bishop Capen Nelson begin 45 years of service in Belém, Pará, Brazil, establishing the first Protestant Church in Amazonia in 1883
- 1880 – Conversion of Xi Shengmo (1836-1896), a brilliant Confucian philosopher who after being freed opium, dedicated his life to preaching the Gospel and creating of rehabilitation centers for thousands of opium addicts in the Chinese province of Shanxi and other cities and towns such as Chao-ch'eng, Teng-ts'uen, Hoh-chau, T'ai-yuan and Ping-yang, along with his wife. In 1906, there were, in all, 45 rehabilitation centers and 300,000 healed.
- 1881 – Methodist work in Lahore, Pakistan starts in the wake of revivals under Bishop William Taylor; North Africa Mission (now Arab World Ministries) founded on work of Edward Glenny in Algeria
- 1881 – Home & Foreign Mission Fund (now known as Interlink) was established in Glasgow as a missionary service group for brethren missionaries from Scotland
- 1882 – James Gilmour, London Missionary Society missionary to Mongolia, goes home to England for a furlough. During that time he published a book: Among the Mongols. It was so well-written that one critic wrote, "Robinson Crusoe has turned missionary, lived years in Mongolia, and wrote a book about it." Concerning the author, the critic said, "If ever on earth there lived a man who kept the law of Christ, and could give proof of it, and be absolutely unconscious that he was giving it to them, it is this man whom the Mongols called 'our Gilmour.'"
- 1882 - Alice Mary Robertson, granddaughter of missionary Samuel Worcester, founds Nuyaka Mission near present-day Okmulgee, Oklahoma, primarily ministering to Creek Nation.
- 1883 – Salvation Army enters West Pakistan; A.B. Simpson organizes The Missionary Union for the Evangelization of the World. The first classes of the Missionary Training College are held in New York City. Zaire Christian and Missionary Alliance mission field opens.
- 1884 – David Torrance is sent by the Jewish Mission of the Free Church of Scotland as a medical missionary to Palestine
- 1884 – Alice Hyson is sent by Mrs. F. E. H. Haines, and the Women's Home Missionary Society of the Presbyterian Church, to Taos, New Mexico
- 1885 – Horace Grant Underwood, Presbyterian missionary, and Henry Appenzeller, Methodist missionary, arrive in Korea; Scottish Ion Keith-Falconer goes to Aden on the Arabian peninsula; "Cambridge Seven" -- C. T. Studd, M. Beauchamp, W. W. Cassels, D. E. Hoste, S. P. Smith, A. T. Polhill-Turner, C. H. Polhill-Turner—go to China as missionaries with the China Inland Mission
- 1886 – Student Volunteer Movement launched as 100 university and seminary students at Moody's conference grounds at Mount Hermon, Massachusetts, sign the Princeton Pledge which says: "I purpose, God willing, to become a foreign missionary."
- 1886 – Johann Flierl, missionary, arrives in New Guinea
- 1887 – The Hundred missionaries deployed in one year in China under the China Inland Mission. Dr. William Cassidy, a Toronto medical doctor, was ordained as the Christian and Missionary Alliance's first missionary preacher. Unfortunately, en route to China, he died of smallpox. However, Cassidy's death has been called the "spark that ignited the Alliance missionary blaze."
- 1888 – Jonathan Goforth sails to China; Student Volunteer Movement for foreign missions officially organized with John R. Mott as chairman and Robert Wilder as traveling secretary. The movement's motto, coined by Wilder, was: "The evangelization of the world in this generation.; Scripture Gift Mission (now Lifewords) founded; Lilias Trotter, founder of the Algiers Mission Band, arrives in Algiers
- 1889 – Missionary linguist and folklorist Paul Olaf Bodding arrives in India, Santhal Parganas, and continues the work among the Santals started by Skrefsrud and Børresen in 1867; North Africa Mission enters Tripoli as first Protestant mission in Libya
- 1890 – Presbyterian missionary, Robert M. Loughridge, founded the First Presbyterian Church of Coweta.
- 1890 – Central American Mission founded by C. I. Scofield, editor of the Scofield Reference Bible; Methodist Charles Gabriel writes missionary song "Send the Light"; John Livingston Nevius of China visits Korea to outline his strategy for missions: 1) Each believer should be a productive member of society and active in sharing his faith; 2) The church in Korea should be distinctly Korean and free of foreign control; 3) The leaders of the Korean church will be selected and trained from its members; 4) Church buildings will be built by Koreans with their own resources; Fredrik Franson founds the Scandinavian Alliance Mission in Chicago, later known as The Evangelical Alliance Mission.
- 1891 – Samuel Zwemer goes to Basra in southern Iraq, having founded the Arabian Mission in 1890; Helen Chapman sails for the Congo (Zaire). She married a Danish missionary, William Rasmussen, whom she met during the voyage.
- 1892 – Redcliffe College, Centre for Mission Training founded in Chelsea, London
- 1892 – Open Air Campaigners was founded in Sydney, Australia as "Coogee Open Air Mission".
- 1893- Charles Frederick Reeve started the Poona and Indian Village Mission at Poona.
- 1893 – Eleanor Chesnut goes to China as Presbyterian medical missionary; Sudan Interior Mission (SIM) founded by Rowland Bingham, a graduate of Nyack College
- 1894 – Soatanana Revival begins among Lutheran and LMS churches in Madagascar, lasting 80 years
- 1895 – Africa Inland Mission formed by Peter Cameron Scott; Japan Bible Society established; Roland Allen sent as missionary for the Society for the Propagation of the Gospel in Foreign Parts to its North China Mission. Amy Carmichael arrives in India.
- 1896 – Ödön Scholtz founds the first Hungarian Lutheran foreign mission periodical Külmisszió
- 1897 – Presbyterian Church (USA) begins work in Venezuela
- 1897 – Russian Orthodox Church decided to establish a mission in Korea
- 1898 – Theresa Huntington leaves her New England home for the Middle East. For seven years she will work as an American Board missionary in Elazığ (Kharput) in the Ottoman Empire. Her letters home will be published in a book titled Great Need over the Water; Archibald Reekie of the Canadian Baptist Ministries arrives in Oruro as the first Protestant missionary to Bolivia. The work of Canadian Baptists led to the guarantee of freedom of religion in Bolivia in 1905.
- 1899 – James Rodgers arrives in Philippines with the Presbyterian Mission; Central American Mission enters Guatemala

== 1900 to 1949 ==
- 1900 – First Orthodox missionary from Russia enters Korea
- 1900 – American Friends open work in Cuba; Ecumenical Missionary Conference in Carnegie Hall, New York (162 mission boards represented); 189 missionaries and their children killed in Boxer Rebellion in China; South African Andrew Murray writes The Key to the Missionary Problem in which he challenges the church to hold weeks of prayer for the world
- 1901 – Nazarene John Diaz goes to Cape Verde Islands; Maude Cary sails for Morocco; Oriental Missionary Society founded by Charles Cowman (his wife is the compiler of popular devotional book Streams in the Desert); Missionary James Chalmers killed and eaten by cannibals in Papua New Guinea
- 1902-1927 – With world attention focused on the anti-Western Boxer Rebellion, American Protestants made missions to China a high priority. They supported 500 missionaries in 1890, more than 2000 in 1914, and 8300 in 1920. By 1927 they opened 16 American universities in China, six medical schools, and four theology schools, together with 265 middle schools and a large number of elementary schools. The number of converts was not large, but the educational influence was dramatic.
- 1902 – Swiss members of the Plymouth Brethren enter Laos
- 1902 – California Yearly Meeting of Friends opens work in Guatemala
- 1903 – First Orthodox parish in Korea opens
- 1903 – Church of the Nazarene enters Mexico
- 1903 – First group baptism at Sattelberg Mission Station under Christian Keyser in New Guinea paves way for mass conversions during the following years
- 1904 – Premillennialist theologian William Eugene Blackstone begins teaching that the world has already been evangelized, citing Acts 2:5, 8:4, Mark 16:20 and Colossians 1:23
- 1904 – European Christian Mission was founded in Estonia by J.P. Raud. Today it is known as European Christian Mission International.
- 1905 – Gunnerius Tollefsen is converted at a Salvation Army meeting under the preaching of Samuel Logan Brengle. Later he would become a missionary to the Belgian Congo and then first mission secretary of the Norwegian Pentecostal movement.
- 1905 – Sadhu Sundar Singh, an Indian missionary, former adherent of Sikhism, begins his ministry as sadhu preaching in Northern India and Tibet. From 1918-1922, he travels to preach throughout the world, but finishes his career in new missions to Tibet.
- 1906 – The Evangelical Alliance Mission (TEAM) opens work in Venezuela with T. J. Bach and John Christiansen
- 1907 – Massive revival meetings in Korea; Harmon Schmelzenbach sails for Africa; Presbyterians and Methodists open Union Theological Seminary in Manila, Philippines; Bolivian Indian Mission founded by George Allen
- 1908 – Gospel Missionary Union opens work in Colombia with Charles Chapman and John Funk; Pentecostal movement enters Rome and southern Italy as well as Egypt
- 1909 – Pentecostal movement reaches Chile through ministry of American Methodist Willis Hoover
- 1910 – Edinburgh Missionary Conference held in Scotland, presided over by John Mott, beginning modern Protestant ecumenical cooperation in missions
- 1911 – Christian & Missionary Alliance enters Cambodia and Vietnam
- 1912 – Conference of British Missionary Societies formed; International Review of Missions begins publication
- 1913 – C.T. Studd establishes Heart of Africa Mission, now called WEC International; African-American Eliza Davis George sails from New York for Liberia; William Whiting Borden dies in Egypt while preparing to take the gospel to the Muslims in China
- 1914-1918 World War I numerous missionaries in Africa and Asia in British, French, German and Belgian colonies are expelled or detained for the duration of the war, if their nation was at war with the colonial authority.
- 1914-1918 The World War reduced the enthusiasm for missions, and led to growing doubts about the wisdom of cultural imperialism in dealing with foreign peoples.
- 1914 – Large-scale revival movement in Uganda; C.T. Studd reports a revival movement in the Congo
- 1914 – Paul Olaf Bodding completes his translation of the Bible into the Santali language.
- 1915 – Founded in 1913 in Nanjing, China as a women's Christian college, Ginling College officially opens with eight students and six teachers. It was supported by four missions: the Northern Baptists, the Christian Church (Disciples of Christ), the Methodists, and the Presbyterians.
- 1916 – Rhenish missionaries are forced to leave Ondjiva in southern Angola under pressure from the Portuguese authorities and Chief Mandume of the Kwanyama. By then, four congregations existed with a confessing membership of 800.
- 1917 – Interdenominational Foreign Mission Association (IFMA) founded
- 1919 – The Union Version of Bible in Chinese is published; Gospel Missionary Union enters Sudan and Mali
- 1920 – Baptist Mid-Missions formed by William Haas; Church of the Nazarene enters Syria; Columbans enter Australia and New Zealand
- 1921 – Founding of International Missionary Council (IMC); Norwegian Mission Council formed; Columbans enter China
- 1922 – Nazarenes enter Mozambique
- 1923 – Scottish missionaries begin work in British Togoland
- 1924 – Bible Churchman's Missionary Society opens work in Upper Burma; Baptist Mid-Missions begins work in Venezuela
- 1925 – Daniel Fleming published Whither Bound in Missions (YMCA Press), challenging the over-emphasis on conversions. Missions should instead focus on fighting evils such as materialism, racial injustice, war and poverty.
- 1925 – E. Stanley Jones, Methodist missionary to India, writes The Christ of the Indian Road
- 1926 – Charles J. McDonald, a Southern Baptist layman, started work in the town of Wahiawa, Territory of Hawaii, with a Sunday School which eventually became the First Baptist Church of Wahiawa.
- 1927 – Ngulhao Thomsong translates the Bible into Thadou-Kuki Language East African revival movement (Balokole) emerges in Rwanda and moves across several other countries
- 1928 – Cuba Bible Institute (West Indies Mission) opens; Jerusalem Conference of International Missionary Council; foundation of Borneo Evangelical Mission by Hudson Southwell, Frank Davidson and Carey Tolley.
- 1929 – Christian & Missionary Alliance enters East Borneo (Indonesia) and Thailand
- 1930 – Christian & Missionary Alliance starts work among Baouli tribe in the Ivory Coast
- 1931 – Franciscan missionary the Venerable Gabriele Allegra arrives in Hunan China from Italy to start translating the Bible
- 1931 – HCJB radio station started in Quito, Ecuador by Clarence Jones; Baptist Mid-Missions enters Liberia
- 1932 - William Ernest Hocking, et al. Re-Thinking Missions: A Laymen's Inquiry After One Hundred Years marks the turning away from traditional missions by the mainstream Protestant denominations, leaving the field to the evangelicals and fundamentalists.
- 1932 – Assemblies of God opens mission work in Colombia; Laymen's Missionary Inquiry report published
- 1933 – Gladys Aylward (subject of movie The Inn of the Sixth Happiness) arrives in China; Columbans enter Korea
- 1934 – William Cameron Townsend begins the Summer Institute of Linguistics; Columbans enter Japan
- 1935 – Frank C. Laubach, American missionary to the Philippines, perfects the "Each one teach one" literacy program, which has been used worldwide to teach 60 million people to read
- 1936 – With the outbreak of civil war in Spain, missionaries are forced to leave that country.
- 1937 – After expulsion of missionaries from Ethiopia by Italian invaders, widespread revival erupts among Protestant (SIM) churches in south; Child Evangelism Fellowship founded by Jesse Irvin Overholzer
- 1938 – Madras World Missionary Conference held; Dutch missiologist Hendrik Kraemer publishes his seminal work The Christian Message in a non-Christian World; West Indies Mission enters Dominican Republic; Church Missionary Society forced out of Egypt; Dr. Orpha Speicher completes construction of Reynolds Memorial Hospital in central India
- 1939-1945 – World War II numerous missionaries in Africa and Asia in British, French and Belgian colonies are expelled or detained for the duration of the war, if their nation was at war with the colonial authority
- 1939 – A sick missionary, Joy Ridderhof, makes a recording of gospel songs and a message and sends it into the mountains of Honduras. It is the beginning of Gospel Recordings
- 1940 – Marianna Slocum begins translation work in Mexico; Military police in Japan arrests the executive officers of the Salvation Army
- 1942 – William Cameron Townsend founds Wycliffe Bible Translators; New Tribes mission founded with a vision to reach the tribal peoples of Bolivia
- 1943 – CBFMS Conservative Baptist Foreign Mission Society [now WorldVenture] was formed sending Missionaries to the CONGO, South America and Philippines, now in over 60 countries.
- 1943 – Five missionaries with New Tribes Mission go missing in Bolivia; 11 American Baptist missionaries beheaded in the Philippines by Japanese soldiers
- 1944 – Missionaries return to Suki, Papua New Guinea after withdrawal of the Japanese military
- 1945 – Mission Aviation Fellowship formed; Far East Broadcasting Company (FEBC) founded; Evangelical Foreign Missions Association formed by denominational mission boards K.S. Latourette completes his seven volume set A history of the expansion of Christianity
- 1945 – The Venerable Gabriele Allegra establishes the Studium Biblicum Franciscanum in Beijing
- 1946 – Thomas Tien Ken-sin, SVD is named the first Chinese Cardinal by Pope Pius XII. He is exiled from China in 1951 by the Communist regime.
- 1946 – First Inter-Varsity missionary convention (now called "Urbana"); United Bible Societies formed
- 1947 – Whitby World Missionary Conference in Canada; Conservative Baptist Foreign Mission Society begins work among the Senufo people in the Ivory Coast
- 1948 – Alfredo del Rosso merges his Italian Holiness Mission with the Church of the Nazarene, thus opening Nazarene work on the European continent; Southern Baptist Convention adopts program calling for the tripling of the number of missionaries.
- 1949 – Southern Baptist Mission board opens work in Venezuela, Mary Tripp sent out by CEF Child Evangelism Fellowship to the Netherlands.
- 1949 – Russian Orthodox Church stops in all activities in Korea.

== 1950 to 1999 ==
- 1950 – Paul Orjala arrives in Haiti; radio station 4VEH, owned by East and West Indies Bible Mission, starts broadcasting from near Cap-Haïtien, Haiti
- 1951 – Communist government of China expels all Christian missionaries; the void was more than filled by a Chinese Church, 25% of which consisted of independent churches.
- 1951 – Eastern Orthodoxy is re-introduced in Korea by Greeks, and disseminates after almost 51 years since its first introduction in 1900
- 1951 – World Evangelical Alliance organized; Bill and Vonette Bright create Campus Crusade for Christ at UCLA; Alaska Missions is founded (later to be renamed InterAct Ministries).
- 1952 – Willingen World Missionary Conference in Germany; Trans World Radio founded
- 1953 – Walter Trobisch, who would publish I loved a girl in 1962, begins pioneer missionary work in northern Cameroon
- 1954 – Mennonite Board of Missions and Charities opens work in Cuba; Argentina Revival breaks out during Tommy Hicks crusade; Augustinians re-established in Japan; Columbans enter Chile
- 1955 – Korean Orthodox Church lies under the jurisdiction of the Ecumenical Patriarchate of Constantinople
- 1955 – Donald McGavran publishes Bridges of God; Dutch missionary "Brother Andrew", founder of Open Doors makes first of many Bible smuggling trips into Communist Eastern Europe;
- 1956 – U.S. missionaries Jim Elliot, Pete Fleming, Edward McCully, Nate Saint, and Roger Youderian are killed by Huaorani Indians in eastern Ecuador. (See Operation Auca)
- 1957 – East Asia Christian Conference (EACC) founded at Prapat, Sumatra, Indonesia
- 1958 – Rochunga Pudaite completes translation of Bible into Hmar language (India) and was appointed the leader of the Indo-Burma Pioneer Mission; Missionaries Elisabeth Elliot and Rachel Saint make first peaceful contact with the Huaorani tribe in Ecuador.
- 1959 – Radio Lumière founded in Haiti by West Indies Mission (now World Team); Josephine Makil becomes the first African-American to join Wycliffe Bible Translators; Feba Radio founded in UK.
- 1960 – Kenneth Strachan starts Evangelism-in-Depth in Central America; 18,000 people in Morocco reply to newspaper ad by Gospel Missionary Union offering free correspondence course on Christianity; Loren Cunningham founds Youth with a Mission; The Asia Evangelistic Fellowship (AEF), one of the largest Asian indigenous missionary organisations, is launched in Singapore by G. D. James
- 1961 – International Missionary Council (IMC) integrated into the World Council of Churches (WCC) and renamed Commission on World Mission and Evangelism (CWME); International Christian radio stations now number 30
- 1962 – Don Richardson goes to Sawi tribe in Papua New Guinea; Operation Mobilisation founded in Mexico by George Verwer
- 1963 – Theological Education by Extension movement launched in Guatemala by Ralph Winter and James Emery
- 1964 – Young missionary and pilot Jerry Douglas Witt; is presumably shot down over the mining town of Minas Las Coloradas, Zacatecas Mexico while dropping Gospels of St. John from his Cessna 170B, killing him and a young Mexican national who was with him; In separate incidents, rebels in the Congo kill missionaries Paul Carlson, Phyllis Rine and Irene Ferrel as well as brutalizing missionary doctor Helen Roseveare; Carlson is featured on December 4 Time magazine cover; Hans von Staden of the Dorothea Mission proposes to Patrick Johnstone that he write the book now titled Operation World
- 1966 – Red Guards destroy churches in China; Berlin Congress on Evangelism; Missionaries expelled from Burma; God's Smuggler published
- 1967 – All foreign missionaries expelled from Guinea
- 1968 – The Studium Biblicum Translation of the Bible is published in Chinese by the Venerable Gabriele Allegra
- 1968 – Wu Yung and others form the Chinese Missions Overseas in order to send out missionaries from Taiwan to do cross-cultural ministry; Augustinian order re-established in India
- 1969 – OMF International begins "industrial evangelism" to Taiwan's factory workers
- 1970 – Fellowship Associates of Medical Evangelism (FAME) Founded in Columbus, IN. Disrupting the Crisis of the lack of access to healthcare to the world's most vulnerable<www.fameworld.org. Frankfurt Declaration on Mission; Operation Mobilisation launches MV Logos ship; Abp. Makarios III (Mouskos) of Cyprus baptizes 10,000 into the Orthodox Church in Kenya.
- 1971 – Gustavo Gutierrez publishes A Theology of Liberation
- 1972 – American Society of Missiology founded with journal Missiology
- 1973 – Services by Billy Graham attract four and a half million people in six cities of Korea; first All-Asa Mission Consultation convenes in Seoul, Korea with 25 delegates from 14 countries; Mission to the World is founded in Georgia
- 1974 – Lausanne Congress on World Evangelization takes place in Lausanne / Switzerland; Missiologist Ralph Winter presents the concept of "hidden" or unreached peoples. Lausanne Covenant is written and ratified
- 1975 – Sotirios Trambas arrives in Seoul
- 1975 – Missionaries Armand Doll and Hugh Friberg imprisoned in Mozambique after communist takeover of government
- 1976 – U.S. Center for World Mission founded in Pasadena, California; 1600 Chinese assemble in Hong Kong for the Chinese Congress on World Evangelization; Islamic World Congress calls for withdrawal of Christian missionaries; Peace Child by Don Richardson appears in Reader's Digest.
- 1977 – Evangelical Fellowship of India sponsors the All-India Congress on Mission and Evangelization
- 1978 – LCWE Consultation on Gospel and Culture in Willowbank, Bermuda; Columbans enter Taiwan
- 1979 – Production of JESUS film commissioned by Bill Bright of Campus Crusade for Christ; Ted Fletcher founds Pioneers, a missionary agency with a focus on "unreached people groups"; Columban missionaries enter Pakistan at the request of the Bishop of Lahore
- 1980 – Philippine Congress on Discipling a Whole Nation; Lausanne Congress on World Evangelism Conference in Pattaya
- 1981 – Colombian terrorists kidnap and kill Wycliffe Bible Translator Chet Bitterman; Project Pearl: one million Bibles are delivered in a single night to thousands of waiting believers in China
- 1982 – Story on "The New Missionary" makes December 27 cover of Time magazine; Andes Evangelical Mission (formerly Bolivian Indian Mission) merges into SIM (formerly Sudan Interior Mission)
- 1983 – Missionary Athletes International, a global soccer ministry, founded by Tim Conrad
- 1984 – Founding of The Mission Society for United Methodists, a voluntary missionary sending agency within the United Methodist Church; rebranded in 2006 to The Mission Society; Founding of STEM (Short Term Evangelical Mission teams) ministry by Roger Petersen signals the rising importance of Short-term missions groups
- 1985 – Founding of Every Child Ministries, a mission organization focused on African children and youth, with special attention to groups of neglected, abused or marginalized children, founded by John and Lorella Rouster with DR Congo (then Zaire) as its first field of service
- 1985 – Howard Foltz founds Accelerating International Mission Strategies (AIMS)
- 1987 – Second International Conference on Missionary Kids (MKs) held in Quito, Ecuador
- 1989 – Missionary pathologist, Dr. Ron Guderian, develops cure for and helps to elimatinate River Blindless in Ecuador. He also develops cure that reverses effect of snake venom, saving the lives of many within very rural villages in Ecuador. This leads to many conversions in Ecuador.
- 1989 – The International Christian Fellowship, a small mission organisation operating in Sri Lanka, south India and the Philippines, became part of SIM. The Lausanne Congress II on World Evangelization Lausanne II, an evangelical world missions conference, takes place in Manila / Philippines; the concept of 10/40 Window emerges; Adventures In Missions (Georgia) (AIM) Short-term missions agency founded by Seth Barnes; "Ee-Taow" video released by New Tribes Mission.
- 1990 – YWAM missionaries Jeff and Els Woodke begin work with Tuareg and Wodaabe pastoralists in Abalak, Niger.
- 1991 – The Marxist government of Ethiopia is overthrown and missionaries are able to return to that country
- 1992 – World Gospel Mission (National Holiness Missionary Society) starts work in Uganda
- 1993 – Trans World Radio starts broadcasting from a 250,000-watt shortwave transmitter in Russia; Anglican Frontier Missions founded
- 1994 – Liibaan Ibraahim Hassan, a convert to Christianity in Somalia, is martyred by Islamic militants in the capital city of Mogadishu;
- 1995 – Missionary Don Cox abducted in Quito, Ecuador
- 1996 – Nazarenes enter Hungary, Kazakhstan, Pakistan
- 1997 – Foreign Mission Board and Home Mission Board of Southern Baptist Convention become the International Mission Board and North American Mission Board with ten thousand missionaries
- 1998 – Ambrosios-Aristotelis Zografos arrives in Seoul. African Evangelical Fellowship (AEF) merges with SIM.
- 1999 – Trans World Radio goes on the air from Grigoriopol (Moldova) using a 1-million-watt AM transmitter; Veteran Australian missionary Graham Stuart Staines and his two sons are burned alive by Hindu extremists as they are sleeping in a car in eastern India.

== 2000 to present ==
- 2000 – Asia College of Ministry (ACOM), a ministry of Asia Evangelistic Fellowship (AEF), was launched by Jonathan James, to train national missionaries in Asia.
- 2001 – New Tribes Missionaries Martin and Gracia Burnham are kidnapped in the Philippines by Muslim terrorist group; Baptist missionary Roni Bowers and her infant daughter are killed when a Peruvian Air Force jet fires on their small float-plane. Though severely wounded in both legs, missionary pilot Kevin Donaldson landed the burning plane on the Amazon River.
- 2003 – Publication of Back To Jerusalem: Called to Complete the Great Commission – Three Chinese Church Leaders with Paul Hattaway brings Chinese and Korean mission movement to forefront; Coptic priest Fr. Zakaria Botros begins his television and internet mission to Muslims in North Africa, the Middle East, Central Asia, and western countries, resulting in thousands of conversions.
- 2004 – Four Southern Baptist missionaries are killed by gunman in Iraq
- 2005 – Korean Catholic Bible completed, the first translation of the entire Bible into modern Korean language.
- 2006 – Abdul Rahman, an Afghan Christian convert, is forced out of Afghanistan by local Muslim leaders and exiled to Italy. Missionary Vijay Kumar is publicly stoned by Hindu extremists for Christian preaching.
- 2007 – Kriol Bible completed, the first translation of the entire Bible into an Australian indigenous language
- 2010 – The Third Lausanne Congress on World Evangelization held in Cape Town, South Africa
- 2012 – A study by political scientist Robert Woodberry, focusing on Protestant missionaries, found that they have often left a very positive societal impact in the areas where they worked. "In cross-national statistical analysis Protestant missions are significantly and robustly associated with higher levels of printing, education, economic development, organizational civil society, protection of private property, and rule of law and with lower levels of corruption".
- 2016 – MECO UK and Ireland merge with SIM.
- 2019 – Vatican holds synod on the evangelization of the Amazon.

== See also ==
- Missionary
- Christianity and colonialism
- Conversion to Christianity
- Evangelism
- Indigenous church mission theory
- Missiology
- Mission (Christianity)
  - Catholic missions
- List of Christian Missionaries
- Missionary kid
- Missionary religious institutes and societies
- Proselytism
