= Russian South Korean =

Russian South Korean or South Korean Russian may refer to:

- Russia–South Korea relations
- Russians in South Korea
- South Koreans in Russia, see Koryo-saram
- Multiracial people of Russian and South Korean descent
