= Korean Russian =

Korean Russian or Russian Korean may refer to:

- South Korea-Russia relations
- Russia-North Korea relations
- Cyrillization of Korean
- Russians in Korea
- Ethnic Koreans in the former USSR
  - Koryo-saram, 19th-century immigrants to the Russian Far East who were later deported to Central Asia
  - Sakhalin Koreans, Japanese colonial-era immigrants stranded on Sakhalin when the Soviets invaded
  - North Koreans in Russia, citizens of North Korea who migrated to Russia after the division of Korea
  - Koryo-mar, the language of the Koryo-saram
- North Korea–Russia border
