= North Korean Russian =

North Korean Russian or Russian North Korean may refer to:

- North Koreans in Russia
- Russians in North Korea
- North Korea – Russia relations
- Mixed race people of North Korean and Russian descent
