= St. Nicholas Cathedral (Seoul) =

- 정교회 성 니콜라스 대성당
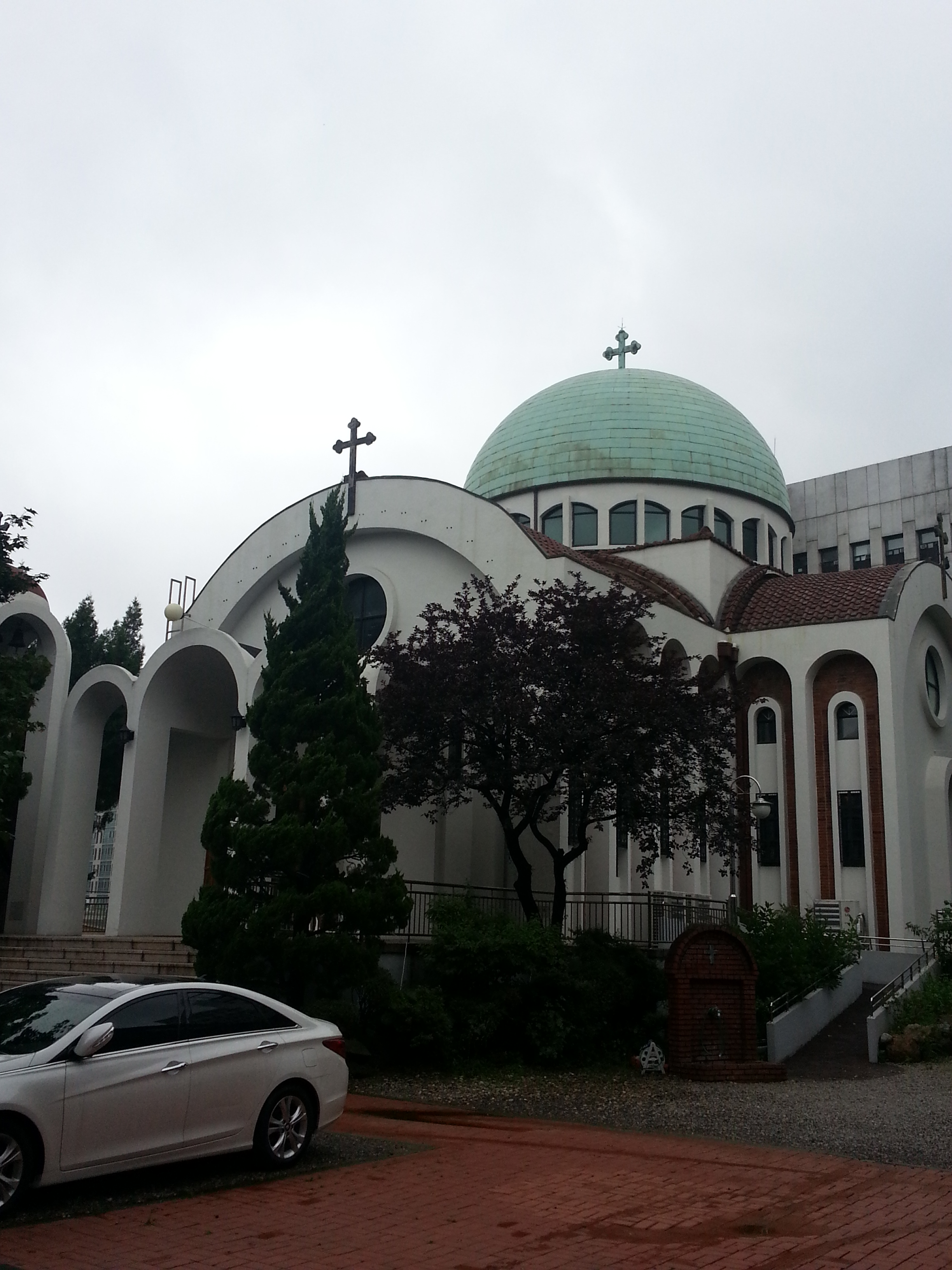
- St. Nicholas Cathedral in Seoul
- St. Nicholas Cathedral
- 37°33′05″N 126°57′26″E
- Location: Ahyeon-dong, Mapo District, Seoul
- Country: South Korea
- Denomination: Eastern Orthodox

History
- Status: Cathedral
- Founded: 1903; 123 years ago
- Dedication: Saint Nicholas
- Consecrated: 17 April 1903

Architecture
- Functional status: Active
- Heritage designation

Seoul Future Heritage
- Reference no.: 2013-275
- Architectural type: Cathedral
- Style: Byzantine Revival
- Completed: 1903 (1st building); 1968 (current building)

Administration
- Province: Ecumenical Patriarchate of Constantinople
- Archdiocese: Eastern Orthodox Metropolis of Korea and Exarch of Japan

Clergy
- Archbishop: Ambrosios Zografos

St. Nicholas Cathedral (Korean: 정교회 성 니콜라스 대성당) is the Eastern Orthodox cathedral of the Metropolis of Korea. It is located in Ahyeon-dong, Mapo District, Seoul, South Korea.

== History ==
The first Eastern Orthodox church dedicated to Saint Nicholas, built for the needs of the Russian Ecclesiastical Mission in Korea, was consecrated on 17 April 1903 in central Seoul. The church was destroyed during the Korean War.

The current Byzantine-style cathedral was built in 1968 thanks to the Greek soldiers of the UN mission, who raised funds for the construction. Within the cathedral are two icons brought by the first Russian missionaries: Theotokos of Tikhvin and Seraphim of Sarov.

In early December 2018, Bartholomew I visited Korea for the fourth time as Patriarch to commemorate the 50th anniversary of St. Nicholas Cathedral.
