= Alfred Wright (missionary) =

American missionary and physician (b. 1788, d. 1853)

- Born: March 1, 1788; Columbia, Connecticut
- Died: March 31, 1853 (aged 65); Wheelock Mission, Choctaw Nation, Indian Territory
- Occupations: Missionary, teacher, physician, educator, translator
- Years active: 1819–1853
- Known for: Establishing Wheelock Seminary, translating religious texts from English into Choctaw language

Alfred Wright (March 1, 1788 – March 31, 1853) was an American Presbyterian missionary who established the Wheelock Mission and Seminary among the Choctaw in Indian Territory (present-day Oklahoma). He translated religious texts into the Choctaw language and served as physician, teacher, and minister from 1819 until his death. Wright worked with his wife Harriet at Wheelock from 1832 until 1853 despite chronic health problems.

His parents could not afford to send him to school, so he worked on the family farm until he was 17 years old and could support his own education. He studied medicine at Williams College, then studied theology at Andover Seminary. After graduating from Andover, he was ordained as a Presbyterian minister. Soon, the American Board of Commissioners for Foreign Missions sent him to establish missions for the Choctaw tribe in Mississippi, where he met and married Harriet Bunce.

In 1831, all mission activity ceased while the Choctaws fulfilled an agreement with the United States government to sell their Mississippi homeland and relocate to Indian Territory (the present state of Oklahoma). Late in 1832, the Wrights decided to locate a new mission near present-day Eagletown, Oklahoma. From then until 1846, they built and operated a church and a school to minister to Choctaws living in the surrounding area. Wright named the mission Wheelock, in honor of Eleazar Wheelock, a friend and first president of Dartmouth College.

Trained in medicine, Alfred Wright often needed to tend Choctaw patients who lived some distance from the mission. Harriet took on both teaching and administrative duties for the school, with only one other teacher to assist her. When Alfred was at the mission, he was often busy either preparing sermons or translating religious texts from English to the Choctaw language. Moreover, his physical health was compromised by illnesses through much of his life. Attacks of illness increased in frequency and intensity as he grew older, but he maintained a hectic pace as much as possible. He died on March 31, 1853, and was buried near the mission. Harriet tried to keep the mission going throughout the next year, but soon found her own health was failing. She returned to the East to live with members of her own family, and died in Florida in 1863.

== Early life and education ==
Alfred Wright was born in Columbia, Connecticut on March 1, 1788. His parents were Jeriah (1788-1828) and Temperance (d. 1832) Wright, who were both professors of religion. The family owned a small farm and had eleven children, so could not afford to send Alfred to school. Instead he worked on the family farm until the age of seventeen. By then, he decided to earn his own education. His parents consented to his enrolling in Bacon Academy in Colchester, Massachusetts. Despite his frail health, he was also able to obtain a job teaching school part-time. He enrolled at Williams College in Williamstown, Massachusetts in 1810. Although he initially intended to study medicine and become a doctor, before he finished at Williams, he felt the call to study theology. After graduating from Williams College in September, 1812, he was employed as a preceptor of an academy at Hadley, Massachusetts until November, 1813, when he enrolled at Andover Seminary.

== Ordination and start of missionary career ==
Alfred was ordained as a Presbyterian minister at Charleston, South Carolina on December 17, 1819.

Soon after his ordination, the American Board of Commissioners for Foreign Missions assigned him to establish a Presbyterian mission with the Choctaws in Goshen, Mississippi (Note: No information found about a community with this name. Possibly the source refers to present day Goshen Springs in Rankin County, Mississippi.) where he remained until 1823, when he was sent to the Mayhew Mission. While at Mayhew, Alfred met Harriet Bunce (1779-1863). They married in 1825.

In 1826, Alfred's sister and two of his brothers died of typhus. Their father contracted the same disease, but his case was not fatal.

=== Move to Indian Territory ===
All mission operations ceased in 1831, as the inhabitants of the Choctaw Nation were required to move to their newly designated land in Indian Territory (present-day Southeastern Oklahoma). Alfred and Harriet, along with another missionary, Rev. Loring S. Williams, joined a group of Choctaws led by Thomas LeFlore to make the trip. The party did not reach Indian Territory until September 14, 1832, where they stopped overnight at the Bethabara Mission, near the community of Eagle (now known as Eagletown, Oklahoma, in present-day McCurtain County, Oklahoma. Alfred had taken ill again, and could not continue to travel the next day. (Note: Alfred was never in robust health. He had a chronic heart condition and also suffered from malaria and bursitis.) Deciding to remain at Bethabara Mission, he told Harriet to go ahead with the rest of the party, and he would catch up with them later. The McCurtain party moved out as planned along the Military Trace toward Fort Towson. After the group crossed what is now called the Little River (known to the Choctaws as Boklusa or "Black River"), they found a piece of land about a mile beyond the river and above the flood level, which also had a spring flowing generously with cold water. Harriet decided to camp there with Anna and other travelers who wished to stay with her. The others helped Harriet build a cabin. This would become the site for the Wright's mission.

=== Building the first Wheelock School ===
Alfred recovered slowly, and finally caught up with Harriet and her companions in late November, 1832. He conducted his first service at the new site on December 9, 1832. Since there was no church building yet, the service was held outdoors under a large oak tree. The congregation sat on logs that had been arranged in rows, and Rev. Wright used an empty 100-gallon barrel, turned upside down, as his pulpit. Concurrently, the Wright party decided to build a small log church and a larger log house for the family. Harriet insisted that a large room be attached to the house to serve as a day school. (Note: Since no one else at the mission was trained in medicine, Alfred frequently had to be absent, either to preach or to heal the sick. Thus, Harriet became responsible for operating the school, assisted by Anna Burnham.) Rev. Wright decided to name the new mission church and school Wheelock, in honor of Eleazar Wheelock, who was not only a friend of Alfred, but, years later, also the first president of Dartmouth College.

=== Conversion to boarding school ===
The day school operated until 1839. By then, Harriet realized that this mode was failing to reach enough Choctaw children who needed and wanted to pursue an education. She persuaded Alfred that Wheelock should become a boarding school, because many of the potential students lived at such a distance that it was impractical to attend daily classes on foot. In bad weather, travel became nearly impossible, even on horseback. A log dormitory building was erected in 1839, then expanded over the next three years. A separate classroom building was also built. Instead of paying tuition, the children performed many of the chores need to operate the school: cooking, cleaning, providing firewood, etc. Class time was devoted to learning English, arithmetic, reading, writing and studying the Bible. In 1842, the Choctaw Nation adopted Wheelock into its school system, designating it as Wheelock Seminary, a school exclusively devoted to teaching Choctaw girls. (Note: A similar school for boys was built at Clear Creek, but later moved about two miles from Wheelock and renamed Norwalk Academy.)

=== Rock Church ===
Rev. Wright began building a new Wheelock Rock Church in 1845. Stones were dragged from the banks of Little River by teams of oxen. These were used to make the church walls 20 inches (510 mm) thick. The floor and belfry were made from cypress wood and the roof was covered with sun-cured oak shakes. Wright carved a slogan, "Jehovah Jireh" (meaning "the Lord will provide") into the gable of the church. Rev. Wright delivered the first sermon in the new church during the late spring or early summer of 1846.

== Deaths of Alfred and Harriet ==
Rev. Alfred Wright's attacks of illness increased in frequency and intensity as he grew older, yet he persisted in maintaining a hectic pace. He spent as much time as he could translating religious documents from English into the Choctaw language until he died on March 31, 1853, and was buried very near Wheelock church. Harriet tried to keep on with the school during 1854, but found her own health failing rapidly by the end of the school year. She went back east to live with members of her own family, and died on October 3, 1863, in Madison, Florida.

== See also ==
- Eleazar Wheelock
- Wheelock Academy
- Wheelock Church
