= Eastern Orthodox Metropolis of Korea =

Eastern Orthodox diocese

Metropolis of Korea of the Ecumenical Patriarchate of Constantinople
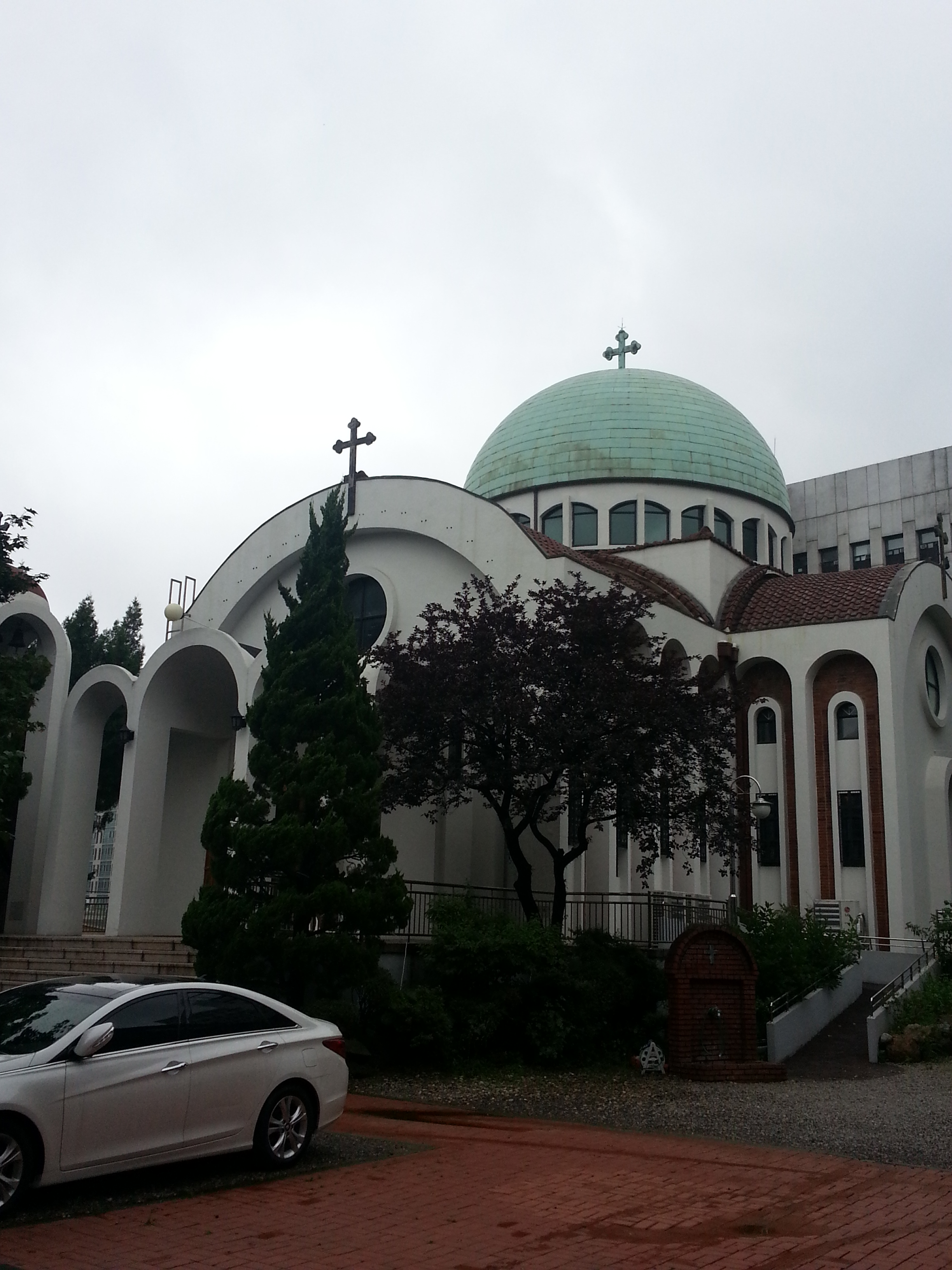
- St. Nicholas Cathedral, Seoul

Location
- Territory: South Korea
- Headquarters: Seoul

Statistics
- Population: Total: approximately 6,000

Information
- Denomination: Eastern Orthodox
- Rite: Byzantine Rite
- Established: 2004
- Language: Korean, Church Slavonic, Greek

Current leadership
- Parent church: Ecumenical Patriarchate of Constantinople
- Patriarch: Bartholomew I of Constantinople
- Metropolitan: Ambrosios Zografos

Website
- www.orthodoxkorea.org

- Eastern Orthodox Metropolis of Korea
- Hangul: 한국 정교회
- Hanja: 韓國正教會
- RR: Hanguk Jeonggyohoe
- MR: Han'guk Chŏnggyohoe

The Metropolis of Korea (Korean: 한국 정교회) is an Eastern Orthodox diocese under the jurisdiction of the Ecumenical Patriarchate of Constantinople in Korea (de facto in South Korea).

== History ==
In 1897, in view of the increased presence of Russia′s government officers in Korea, the government of the Russian Empire made a decision to send Russian Orthodox missionaries to Korea. Archimandrite Ambrosius Gudko led the three-person team, but was refused permission to enter the country.

In 1900, a more hospitable atmosphere between Russia and Korea allowed a second missionary team led by Archimandrite Chrysanthos Shehtkofsky to begin an outreach in Seoul. The Archimandrite was joined in Korea by Hierodeacon Nicholas Alexeiev of the original team, and chanter Jonah Leftsenko. On 17 February 1900, in a makeshift chapel the first attested Orthodox Divine Liturgy was celebrated in the Korean peninsula.

The first Orthodox church was constructed in Jung Dong, Jung-gu, the central area of Seoul in 1903 and was consecrated in honor of Saint Nicholas (the building has not survived). However, with the Japanese occupation of Korea (1910—1945) came a period of persecution of Orthodox Christian believers. Notwithstanding, in 1912, John Kang Tak, the first native Korean Orthodox priest, was ordained.

In November 1921, the Holy Synod of the Moscow Patriarchate terminated its support of the Korean Orthodox Church, and subsequently the Japanese Orthodox Church gave up its jurisdictional authority. Thus, in 1946, the Orthodox Church of Korea was put into the position of having to organize itself as a parish.

The year 1947 saw the ordination of a third Korean priest, Fr. Alexei Kim Ui-han, just as the last Russian priest departed the country. Father Alexei Kim was the sole priest of the Orthodox Church left to serve the people of Korea. On 9 July 1950, he was captured and disappeared without record. As the Korean War broke out in 1950, the Orthodox Christian community in the region was dispersed and the organised forms of church life were disrupted.

In 1953, Army Chaplain Archimandrite Andreas Halkiopoulos of the Military Forces of Greece was made aware of Korean Orthodox faithful and arranged for a parish in Seoul to be reestablished. The following year Korean Orthodox Christian Boris Moon Yee-chun was ordained.

On 25 December 1955, after the Christmas Divine Liturgy, the General Assembly of the Orthodox Community of Saint Nicholas in Seoul unanimously decided to request being received in the jurisdictional authority of the Ecumenical Patriarchate of Constantinople. The Ecumenical Patriarchate, under the leadership of Patriarch Athenagoras I, granted the request. In 1956, by decision of the Ecumenical Patriarchate, the pastoral care of the Church in Korea was commissioned to the Archdiocese of Australia and a shortly afterwards to the Archdiocese of North and South America, with Archbishop Mikhail Constantinides being the Exarch of Korea.

In 1975, Archimandrite Sotirios Trambas volunteered to serve in the Korean mission of the Ecumenical Patriarchate. During the ensuing years, he founded a monastery, several parishes both in Korea and in other places in Asia.

In 1993, the Holy Synod of the Ecumenical Patriarchate of Constantinople elected Sotirios Trambas Bishop of Zelon and Auxiliary Bishop to the Metropolitan of New Zealand. In this role, Bishop Sotirios served as Exarch of Korea. On 20 April 2004, the Exarchate of Korea was raised to the rank of a Metropolis and Bishop Sotirios became the first Metropolitan of Korea.

On 28 May 2008, Metropolitan Sotirios retired and was given the title of Metropolitan of Pisidia. On the same day, Bishop Ambrosios Zografos of Zelon, the Auxiliary Bishop of the Metropolis, was elected Metropolitan of Korea and Exarch of Japan.

In early December 2018, the Ecumenical Patriarch Bartholomew I visited Korea for the fourth time as Patriarch to commemorate the 50th anniversary of the St Nicholas Cathedral in Seoul.

== Statistics and jurisdictional dispute ==
Currently, the Korean Orthodox Church has 7 parishes in South Korea: in the cities of Seoul, Busan, Incheon, Jeonju, Palang-Li, Chuncheon, and Ulsan, as well as 13 chapels, the Monastery of the Transfiguration in Kapeong for nuns, the Monastery of St. Andrew the First-called in Yang-gu for monks. It also has the Missionary Center, the Publishing House under the name of "Korean Orthodox Editions", with publications in Korean, two bookstores (Book Café “Philokalia” in Seoul and the Book Café “Logos” in Incheon), the Camp in Chuncheon, a kindergarten under the name of “Annunciation” in Busan, the Centre of Social Welfare for the Elderly in Chuncheon, the Orthodox cemetery in Yeong-miri.

Additionally, in the early 2000s the government of North Korea established the Korean Orthodox Committee and began the construction of a church building in the capital Pyongyang. The construction was said to have begun on the initiative of North Korea′s leader, Kim Jong-il, and the Metropolis of Korea stated it had contributed thereto. In July 2006, the Synod of the Moscow Patriarchate resolved to establish the Church of the Life-Giving Trinity in Pyongyang — within the jurisdiction of the Patriarch of Moscow and all Rus'. In August that year, the church was consecrated by Patriarch Kirill of Moscow. The parish remains effectively under the jurisdiction of the Moscow Patriarchate, which in February 2019, following the Moscow Patriarchate′s unilateral severance of communion with the Patriarchate of Constantinople, established its own diocese of Korea (claiming both North and South), a move publicly condemned by Metropolitan Ambrosios of Korea, but defended in a response by Metropolitan Sergius (Chasin) of Singapore and Southeast Asia.

== See also ==
- Christianity in Korea
- Greek Expeditionary Force (Korea)
- Greece–South Korea relations
- National Council of Churches in Korea
- Religion in South Korea
- Russians in Korea
- Orthodoxy in Korea
