= Russians in Korea =

Minority group in Korea

Total population
- Total population unknown

Regions with significant populations
- South Korea: 71,689 (2024)
- North Korea: <5000

Languages
- Russian, Korean

Religion
- Korean Orthodox Church

Russians in Korea have formed a small community since the period of the Korean Empire, with many of the earliest Russian migrants arriving in Korea from Manchuria. As of 2024, over 70,000 Russians are estimated to live in South Korea.

== Migration history ==
=== Early history ===
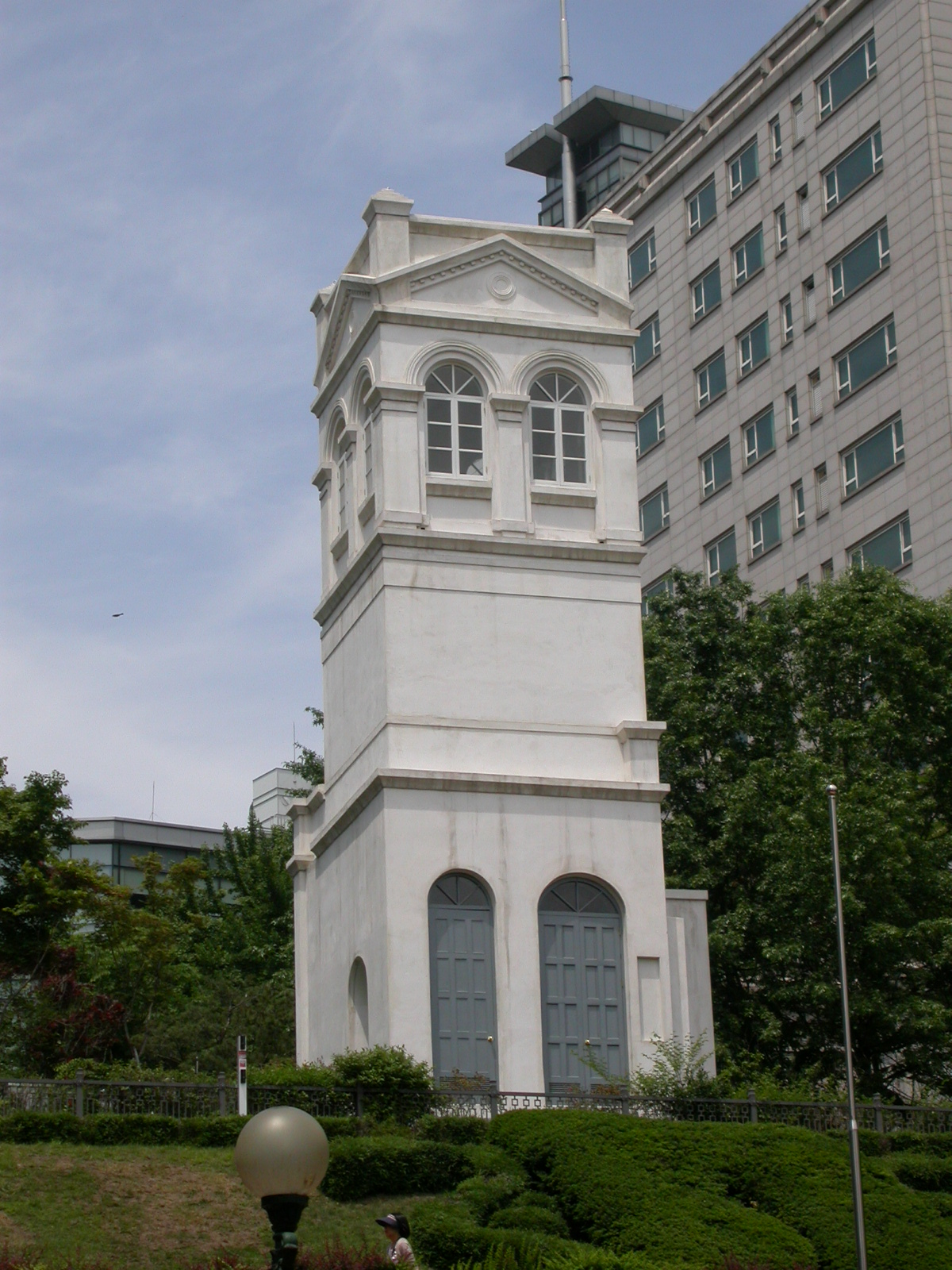
The old Russian legation building in Seoul

Afanasy Ivanovich Seredin-Sabatin, an architect from a family of part-Swiss origin, is the earliest attested Russian in Korea. He was invited from Tianjin, China in 1884 by Emperor Gojong. Karl Ivanovich Weber became the Russian Empire's official representative in Seoul in April 1885.

With the establishment of formal relations, more Russians migrated to Korea in the 1890s, mostly via Manchuria. At the time, the community developed around the Russian legation, opened in 1890, and the Russian Orthodox Church of Saint Nicholas, opened in 1903. Both were in Seoul's Jeongdong (located in present-day Jung-gu). Missionaries, diplomats, and businessmen comprised most of the immigrant community at the time. Russia was influential in Korean politics of the era; after the assassination of Empress Myeongseong in 1895, Emperor Gojong took refuge at the Russian legation. Russia's influence in Korea waned after it was defeated in the Russo-Japanese War in 1905.

A new influx of Russian refugees arrived in 1922 as a result of the fall of Vladivostok to the Red Army. In October of the same year, more than 15,000 refugees landed at Wonsan, Gangwondo. Approximately half obtained passage to Shanghai, but those who had not taken valuables with them were forced to stay in Wonsan for the winter. They relied on charitable donations and itinerant work to survive. According to William Arthur Noble, an American missionary in Korea, no more than 20% were literate. They lived either on overcrowded ships, or in barely heated customs warehouses at the docks. In early 1923, the refugees dispersed; they continued on to Harbin, where a significant community of Russians resided, and Latin America.

In February 1925, Japan recognised the Soviet Union, and relinquished the Russian legation building to the new Soviet ambassador. By the late 1920s, approximately one hundred Russians remained in Seoul. Former nobles and officials lived in Jeongdong, while a community of Tatars lived and worked in the markets near Namdaemun and Honmachi (modern-day Myeongdong). However, due to class divisions within the community, these two groups did not often interact. George Yankovsky, the grandson of a Polish noble exiled to Siberia, also maintained a resort in Chongjin which was popular among the Russian communities of East Asia, but virtually unknown to other westerners. When the Soviet Union invaded Korea, most Russians living there were arrested and forcibly repatriated to the Soviet Union.

=== After independence from the Japanese Empire ===
New Russian communities formed in various cities in South Korea. In Seoul, a "Little Russia" formed in Jung-gu's Gwanghui-dong, near Dongdaemun, in the late 1980s. Roughly 50,000 people from post-Soviet states were estimated to live in the area in 2004, down from 70,000 several years previously due to deportations of illegal immigrants. In Busan, Russians are concentrated in the former "Texas Town" in Jung-gu's Jungang-dong. Approximately 200 live in the city permanently, with several hundred more on short-term visas, along with a large transient population of sailors.

== Religion ==
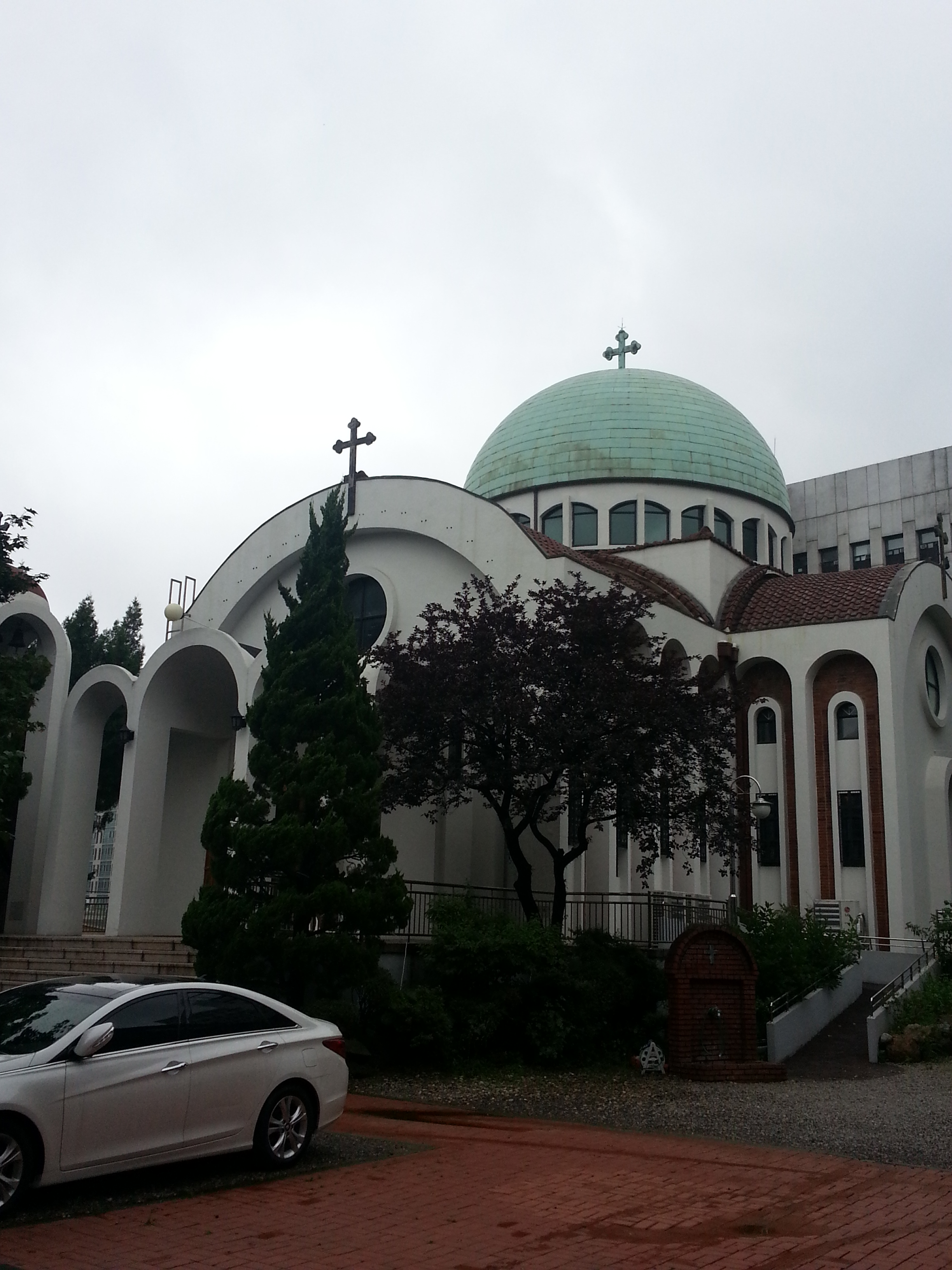
St. Nicholas Cathedral in Seoul, Korea

After the Korean War (1950–1953), South Koreans were unfavorably disposed towards Russia because of its alliance with North Korea. Korean Orthodox believers did not want to have any relations with the Russian Orthodox Church. As a result, a schism opened between the Orthodox Community of South Korea and the Orthodox Church. This was resolved on 25 December 1955, after the Christmas Divine Liturgy, the General Assembly of the Orthodox Community of South Korea unanimously requested jurisdiction under the Ecumenical Patriarchate of Constantinople, which accepted. The Korean Orthodox Church has since remained a metropolis of the See of Constantinople.

After the collapse of the Soviet Union in 1991, the first economic immigrants from Orthodox countries began to arrive in South Korea; many of them sought refuge and support from the Korean Orthodox Church. Then Metropolitan Sotirios Trambas of Korea created the first nucleus of Slavic-speaking Orthodox faithful. He also held special services for Slavic-speakers on Christmas Day and other Feast days with the old Calendar in order to give them a sense of familiarity and belonging. In 1995, during his historic first official visit to South Korea, Bartholomew, the Ecumenical Patriarch, laid the foundation stone of the chapel of Saint Maximus the Greek.

Since then the Orthodox Metropolis of Korea has undertaken the responsibility and pastoral care of all the Orthodox residing in the country as well as those who are temporary visitors and workers, such as sailors and entrepreneurs. In other words, all Orthodox believers of various nationalities (Koreans, Russians, Greeks, etc.) are "under the Omophorion", or spiritual jurisdiction and care, of the Ecumenical Patriarch. In order to provide proper pastoral care to all Orthodox in Korea, apart from the Cathedral of St. Nicholas in Seoul, there is also the Chapel of St. Maximus the Greek, in which the Services and the Divine Liturgy are celebrated in Slavonic for Slavic-speakers, and occasionally in English for English speakers. Also, in the church of the Annunciation in the Busan, the chapel of Saint George is used for the celebration of the Divine Liturgy in Slavonic for Slavic-speakers who reside in and near Busan.

Since 2022, Russians in Pyongyang have sometimes been served by Orthodox clergy sent from Vladivostok. The Church of the Life-Giving Trinity in Pyongyang was dedicated in 2006. It was built at the order of Kim Jong-il after his visit to the church of Innocent of Irkutsk in Khabarovsk.

== Notable people ==
- Denis Laktionov, football player
- Andrei Lankov, historian and journalist
- Park No-Ja (formerly Vladimir Tikhonov), professor, author, columnist
- Timofey Lapshin, biathlon athlete
- Valeri Sarychev, football goalkeeper and coach
- Ruslan Bernikov, Hockey Player for Anyang Halla
- Sergei Tarasov, pianist and professor at Keimyung University in Daegu.
- Rushan Ziatdinov, professor at Keimyung University in Daegu.
- Oleg Shitin, pianist and professor at Keimyung University in Daegu.
- Andrei Grigorev, professor at Keimyung University in Daegu.
- Eduard De, professor at Keimyung University in Daegu.
- Gi Khan Ten, professor at Keimyung University in Daegu.
- Janna Ballod, professor at Seokyeong University in Seoul.

== See also ==
- Sakhalin Koreans
- Koryo-saram
- Korean Orthodox Church
- Immigration to South Korea
- Russians in Japan
