= Sotirios Trambas =

Greek priest (1929–2022)

Sotirios Trambas (Greek: Σωτήριος Τράμπας; 17 July 1929 – 10 June 2022) was a Greek Orthodox prelate, who served as Orthodox Metropolitan of Korea from 2004 to 2008.

== Biography ==
Trambas was born in Arta in 1929. He graduated from the Theological School of the University of Athens in 1951.

He served his military service at the Military Department of Religion and preached at the military units of Northern Greece.

In 1956, he was tonsured monk of the Holy Monastery of Leimonos in Mytilene, Greece. He was ordained Deacon and served as a preacher at the Metropolis of Methymnis. In 1961 he was ordained Priest and received the office of Archimandrite. In 1963, he returned to the Greek Army and served as chaplain in the Evros area.

From 1969 to 1974, he held the office of Chancellor (senior Archimandrite) of the Archdiocese of Athens. While at this position he established and organized the Center for Family Support and other public welfare institutions of the Archdiocese of Athens.

In November 1975, he volunteered to serve the Orthodox Church in Korea, and with permission from the Holy Synod of Constantinople, became Dean of the St. Nicholas Church in Seoul. In 1986, he was appointed to be the chairman of the Orthodox Eastern Mission. As chairman, he translated Greek church texts into Korean and founded the monastery, a seminary and several parishes in Korea and in other places in Asia.

Then in 1991, he was elected an auxiliary bishop of the Metropolis of New Zealand and Exarch of Korea and was given the title of Bishop of Zelon, and after more than a decade in 2004 he was elected first Metropolitan of newly established Orthodox Metropolis of Korea by the Holy Synod of Constantinople. He also received an honorary citizenship of the Seoul in 2000.

In 2008, he resigned voluntarily as Metropolitan of Korea for health reasons. The Holy Synod of Constantinople accepted his resignation and elected him Metropolitan of Pisidia (Turkey).

Eastern Orthodox Church titles
New title	Metropolitan of Korea; 2004–2008	Succeeded by Metropolitan Ambrosios
