= Ambrosios Zografos =

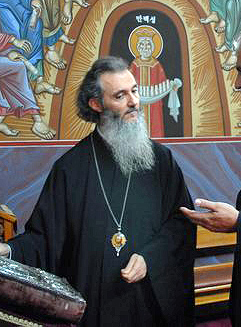
Ambrosios Zografos

Ambrosios (Greek: Αμβρόσιος, secular name Aristotelis Zografos, Greek: Αριστοτέλης Ζωγράφος; born 15 March 1960, Aegina, Attica, Greece) is a bishop of the Ecumenical Patriarchate of Constantinople; the Metropolitan of Korea and Exarch of Japan (since 2008). He is also a professor at the Department of Greek Studies at Hankuk University of Foreign Studies.

== Biographical timeline ==
He was born on the island of Aegina in Greece on 15 March 1960.

In 1983, he graduated from the Theological School of the University of Athens.

In 1985, he was ordained Deacon and in 1991 Priest.

From 1988 to 1989 he served at the library and Icon Gallery of Saint Catherine's Monastery on Mount Sinai in Egypt. From 1991 to 1993, he studied at the Hellenic College Holy Cross Greek Orthodox School of Theology in Brookline, Massachusetts, the U.S., where he earned a Th.M in Patrology. From 1993 to 1996, he studied at Princeton University. In December 1998, he earned a doctorate degree with distinction from the School of Theology of the University of Athens.

On 23 December 1998, he arrived in Korea to serve as Dean of St Nicholas Orthodox Cathedral in Seoul. On 21 December 2006, he was elected auxiliary bishop of the Metropolis of Korea and bishop of Zelon by the Holy Synod of the Ecumenical Patriarchate.

Bishop Ambrosios was elected to the office of Metropolitan of Korea on 28 May 2008, and was enthroned 20 July 2008, at St Nicholas Cathedral in Seoul.

He received an honorary citizenship of the Seoul in 2010.

On 28 November 2016, he was elected the president of the National Council of Churches in Korea and served for a one-year term.

Eastern Orthodox Church titles
Preceded by Metropolitan Sotirios	Metropolitan of Korea; 2008 – present	Succeeded by Incumbent
