= New Korean Youth Association =

1918–1922 Korean independence activist organization

The New Korean Youth Association (Korean: 신한청년당; Hanja: 新韓靑年黨) was an independence movement organization founded around August 1918 in Shanghai, China. It played a significant role around the time of the March First Movement in 1919. The leader of the association was Lyuh Woon-hyung. The six founding members were Lyuh Woon-hyung, Han Jin-gyo, Chang Duk-soo, Kim Chul, Sunwoo Hyuk, and Cho Dong-ho. Additionally, in April 1919, individuals such as Seo Byung-ho, Kim Gu, Yi Kwang-su, and Shin Myung-ho joined and actively participated in the association.

The association's platform consisted of three core principles: Korean Independence, Social Reform, and Global Unity (Great Harmony). In December 1918, they delivered a petition for independence to U.S. President Woodrow Wilson. In January 1919, they dispatched Kim Kyu-sik to the Paris Peace Conference to demand the independence of Korea. Furthermore, they established close communication networks with Tokyo, the Russian Maritime Province (Primorsky Krai), and the Americas. Due to the active efforts of the New Korean Youth Association in 1919, it became the source that inspired Korean international students in Japan to declare the February 8 Declaration of Independence and sparked the nation-wide March First Movement within Korea. Members of this group formed the backbone of the Provisional Government of the Republic of Korea, which was established on April 11, 1919. The Provisional Government appointed Kim Kyu-sik, who was in Paris, as the Minister of Foreign Affairs and had him submit the petition for independence. Later, in December 1922, the association dissolved following a voluntary dissolution order from the Provisional Government.

== History ==
=== Foundation ===
The New Korean Youth Association was founded around August 20, 1918, in the Shanghai French Concession, initiated by six members: Lyuh Woon-hyung, Sunwoo Hyuk, Han Jin-gyo, Chang Duk-soo, Kim Chul, and Cho Dong-ho. Lyuh Woon-hyung, the central figure of the foundation, went into exile in China in 1914, graduated from Nanjing University, and was working in Shanghai at the Mission Book Company, a publisher and seller of Christian books. During this time, he met Chang Duk-soo, who had stopped by Shanghai after completing his studies in Japan. As a result of discussing strategies for the independence movement, the two agreed that youth-led movements were particularly important in the Korean independence movement, which was bound to be a long-term struggle. Kim Chul, Sunwoo Hyuk, Han Jin-gyo, and Cho Dong-ho, who were also staying in Shanghai at the time, actively agreed with this idea, and these six individuals became the initiators who founded the New Korean Youth Association. Initially, they held regular meetings and discussions every Saturday without an official "party name." The name "New Korean Youth Association" was hastily adopted in November 1918, inspired and modeled by Lyuh Woon-hyung after the "Young Turks" led by Turkish politician Kemal Atatürk. At that time, about ten members of the Young Turks were active in Shanghai. Lyuh Woon-hyung learned about the existence and organization of the Young Turks from a fellow foreign international student, Armel Bey, and used it as a reference.

According to its statement of purpose, the founding goal of the New Korean Youth Association was 'to achieve independence, and after recovering independence, to reform the nation culturally and morally to create a New Korean people, and to foster capability by promoting academia and industry so that the new culture of the Korean people would bring great happiness to all mankind.' Furthermore, the ideology of the association proclaimed in the statement of purpose could be summarized as nationalism (independence thought), democracy, republicanism, social reformism, and international pacifism. The association aimed 'to win the independence of the Korean nation, establish a republican democratic state, implement appropriate major reforms in all sectors of society in line with the trends of the times, and build a homeland that engages in international cooperation so that the new culture created by the Korean nation can contribute to all mankind.'

=== Organizational Structure ===
When the New Korean Youth Association was founded, there were only six members. However, around late November 1918, when the dispatch of Kim Kyu-sik to the Paris Peace Conference was discussed, the membership increased to about 20. By the following year, the number of members grew to around 30 to 50. Since the association initially had very few members, it did not set up separate departments, and Lyuh Woon-hyung handled all the affairs of the association as both the representative and general manager. However, as the membership grew and the independence movement began in earnest, they enacted a party constitution, documented their platform, and systematized the organization by defining departments between late November and late December 1918. The party constitution regulated the purpose and organization of the association. The party platform was as follows:

- To strive for the completion of the independence of Korea.
- To select and merge domestic, foreign, new, and old ideas to establish a sound foundation for national thought, encourage academia and arts to contribute to world culture, and reform various social systems to adapt to global trends.
- To make efforts toward the realization of global unity (Great Harmony).

Following the constitution and platform, the New Korean Youth Association reorganized its structure, abolishing the general manager system and implementing a president, chairman of the board, and board of directors system. The association left the position of president vacant and elected Kim Kyu-sik, a new member who was chosen to be dispatched as the representative to the Paris Peace Conference, as the chairman of the board. Under a board of up to ten directors, they established the General Affairs Department, Public Relations Department, and Finance Department. Seo Byung-ho was elected for General Affairs, Lyuh Woon-hyung for Public Relations, and Kim In-jeon for Finance as the responsible directors. Consequently, while Lyuh Woon-hyung and Chang Duk-soo mainly handled the association's affairs immediately after its foundation in August 1918, an organizational structure was formed from late November 1918 where Lyuh Woon-hyung, Seo Byung-ho, and Kim In-jeon managed the association's operations.

=== Activities in the March First Movement ===
The New Korean Youth Association, guided by Shin Kyu-sik, was a small-scale youth independence movement group composed of young agents from the Dongjesa. However, as a subordinate organization of Dongjesa—a secret international organization led by Shin Kyu-sik, the godfather of the independence revolution—it played a leading role in the February 8 Declaration of Independence and the March First Movement the following year, and also made a massive contribution to the establishment of the Provisional Government.

==== Dispatch of the Independence Petition ====
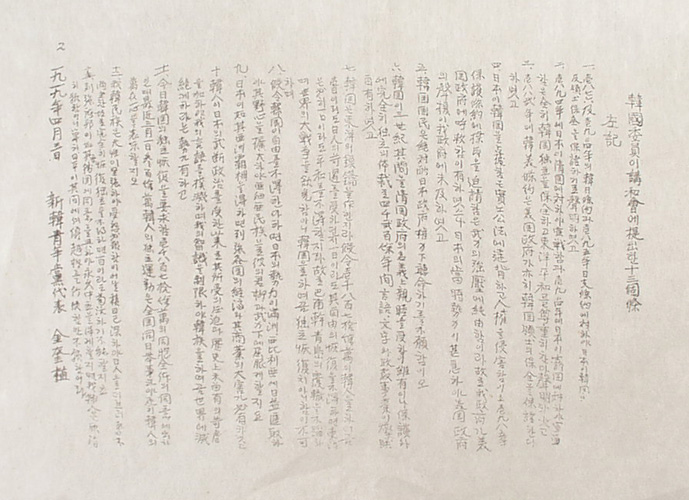
The 13 articles submitted by the New Korean Youth Association to the Paris Peace Conference.

When World War I ended on November 11, 1918, U.S. President Woodrow Wilson immediately dispatched presidential envoy Charles R. Crane to China to explain the U.S. position on the post-war peace conference and advise China to send representatives as well. When Envoy Crane arrived in Shanghai, the Chinese side hosted a welcome reception for the U.S. envoy at the 'Carlton Cafe,' which Lyuh Woon-hyung, representing the New Korean Youth Association, also attended. At this venue, upon hearing Envoy Crane's speech that 'the principle of national self-determination could be discussed as a principle for handling colonies after the defeat,' Lyuh Woon-hyung visited Crane at his lodging and asked whether it would be possible to send a representative of the Korean nation. Although Crane replied that he could not speak for the U.S. government but would personally offer support, Lyuh Woon-hyung called a meeting of the New Korean Youth Association to discuss the matter. In the meeting held at Lyuh's lodging, it was decided to send Kim Kyu-sik, who was residing in Tianjin, to the Paris Peace Conference as the representative of the New Korean Youth Association and Korea. In case they could not raise enough travel expenses to send a representative, they also decided to draft two petitions regarding independence under the name of Lyuh Woon-hyung, the general manager of the association, and deliver one to U.S. President Wilson and the other to the Paris Peace Conference through Crane. Following this decision, Lyuh Woon-hyung drafted two petitions regarding Korean independence in English dated November 28, 1918, and sent them to Wilson through Crane. This document was successfully delivered. In addition, Lyuh Woon-hyung entrusted two identical petitions regarding Korean independence to Thomas Millard, who was going as an advisor to the Chinese delegation to the Paris Peace Conference, in case the Korean representative could not attend. However, this document was not delivered because Millard lost his bag at the port of Yokohama, Japan.

==== Dispatch of Representative to the Paris Peace Conference ====
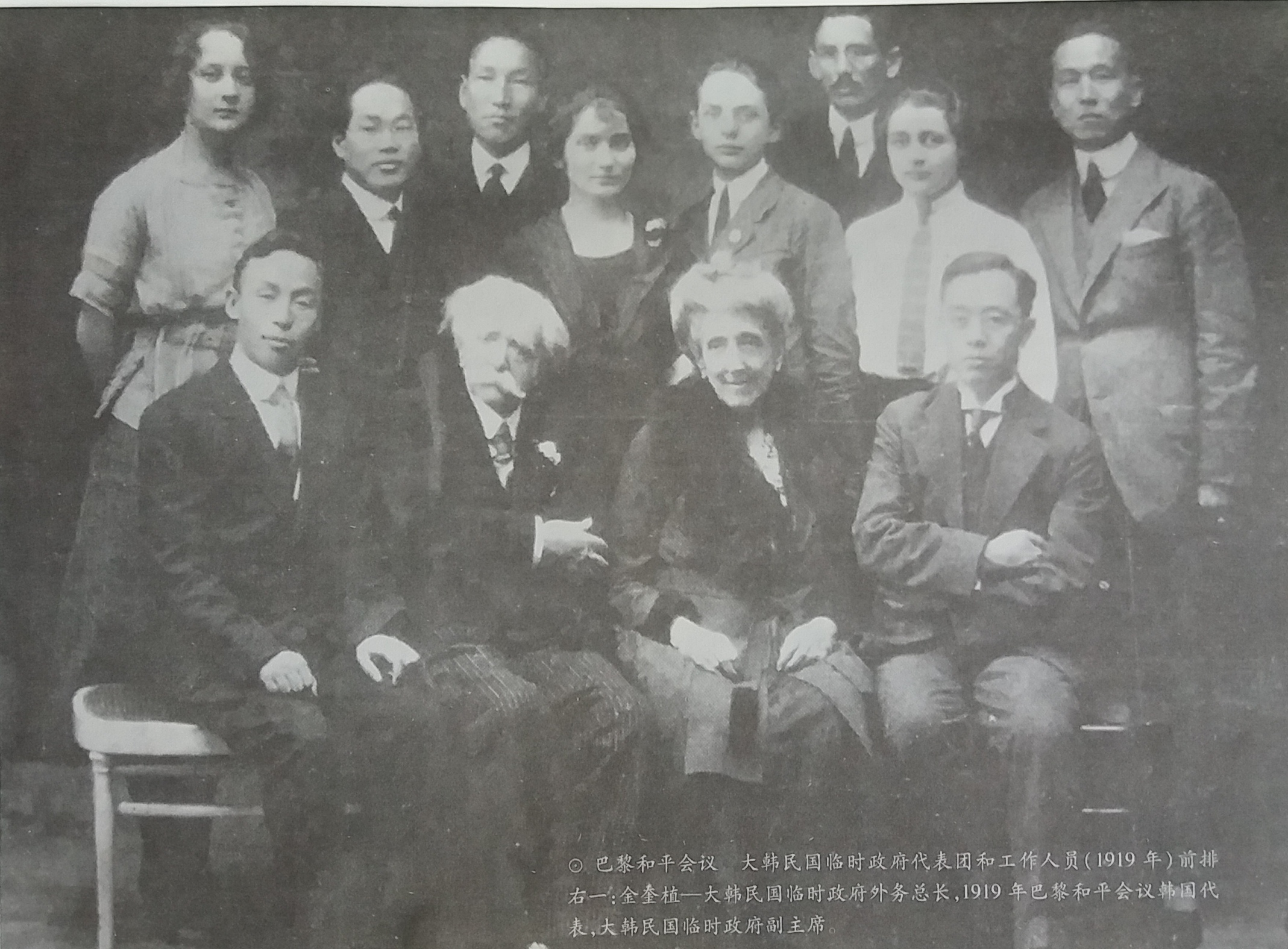
Kim Kyu-sik and the Korean delegation attending the Paris Peace Conference. (Front row, first from left is Lyuh Woon-hong, far right is Kim Kyu-sik, center is the delegation advisor Mr. and Mrs. Blève. Among those standing in the back row, second from left is Yi Gwan-yong, third is Jo So-ang, and at the far end is Hwang Gye-hwan)

The New Korean Youth Association, under the guidance of Yegwan Shin Kyu-sik, held consultations and decided to admit Kim Kyu-sik, who was fluent in English, into the association and simultaneously elect him as the Chairman of the Board, appointing him as both the representative of the association and the Korean nation to the Paris Peace Conference. The expenses were raised by secretly dispatching Chang Duk-soo to Korea, and Kim Kyu-sik departed Shanghai by ship on February 1, 1919. The fact that the association dispatched Kim Kyu-sik to the Paris Peace Conference as the representative of the Korean nation was of great significance to the subsequent March First Movement. This fact was communicated to citizens, independence activists in Korea, and Korean international students in Japan through secret envoys, and the Korean nation rose up in the March First Movement with the purpose of making Kim Kyu-sik's arguments and declarations in Paris clearly express the will of the entire Korean nation to the world. The dispatch of Kim Kyu-sik to the Paris Peace Conference by the association provided a very decisive and important catalyst and focal point for the March First Movement. Kim Kyu-sik arrived at his destination, Paris, France, on March 13, 1919, rented a house at 38 Rue de Châteaudun, established the Korean National Delegation Office, and submitted a petition regarding Korean independence to the peace conference. Kim Kyu-sik subsequently submitted the "Petition for Korean Independence" to the peace conference on May 10, 1919, with the help of U.S. citizen Homer Hulbert, Yi Gwan-yong, Kim Bok, Hwang Gi-hwan, Cho Yong-eun (Note: The original name of Jo So-ang.), and Lyuh Woon-hong, who joined the delegation later. In addition, the delegation drafted numerous promotional documents for the independence movement, including a booklet titled "Korean Independence and Peace," and distributed them to representatives of various countries and journalists, widely proclaiming the Korean desire for independence to the entire world. Although Kim Kyu-sik arrived and operated in Paris as the representative of the New Korean Youth Association, when the Provisional Government of the Republic of Korea was established in Shanghai in April 1919, the Provisional Government appointed Kim Kyu-sik as the official representative of the Republic of Korea to the Peace Conference and Minister to Paris, and Yi Gwan-yong as the vice-representative.

==== Dispatch of Members to Korea ====
In connection with promoting the March First Movement, the New Korean Youth Association dispatched members such as Chang Duk-soo, Sunwoo Hyuk, Kim Chul, Seo Byung-ho, Kim Soon-ae (Note: The wife of Kim Kyu-sik.), and Baek Nam-gyu to Korea. The association dispatched Chang Duk-soo to Korea twice. The first dispatch was around December 1918 to raise funds for the representative's expenses to the Paris Peace Conference. Chang Duk-soo was secretly sent to Busan and returned with 3,000 won in independence movement funds. The second dispatch was to have him meet international students in Japan and then enter Gyeongseong (Seoul), but he was arrested by the Japanese authorities in Incheon. (Note: Afterward, Chang Duk-soo was subjected to residence restrictions and stayed under the surveillance of the Government-General authorities on Haeyi Island, South Jeolla Province.) The association also dispatched Sunwoo Hyuk to Korea in January 1919 to inform people of the dispatch to the Paris Peace Conference and urge them to start an independence demonstration movement, as this was the long-awaited opportunity. Sunwoo Hyuk met his former comrades from the Shinminhoe, including Yang Jeon-baek, Lee Seung-hun, Kang Gyu-chan, An Se-hwan, Byeon In-seo, Lee Deok-hwan, Kim Dong-won, Do In-gwon, Kim Seong-tak, and Yoon Won-sam, and returned via Gyeongseong after gaining their active consent for the independence demonstrations and fund-raising. Later, in response to Sunwoo Hyuk's return, independence demonstrations centered around Christians and students of Soongsil University were prepared in Pyongan Province and Pyongyang, and they received a proposal to form a united front from the Cheondoism side. The association also dispatched Kim Chul to Korea to collect independence movement funds. Entering Korea, Kim Chul met with the Cheondoism side, received a promise to remit 30,000 won for the independence movement funds, and returned. Furthermore, the association sequentially dispatched Seo Byung-ho, Kim Soon-ae, and Baek Nam-gyu to Korea. Seo Byung-ho and Kim Soon-ae went to the Daegu region, while Baek Nam-gyu went to the Honam region to urge the initiation of independence demonstrations and support for the funds to send the Korean representative to the Paris Peace Conference.

==== Dispatch of Members to Japan ====
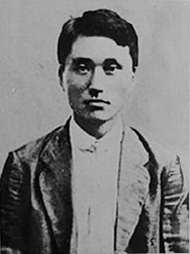
Yi Gwang-su (Chunwon), who went to Japan and drafted the February 8 Declaration of Independence.

The New Korean Youth Association dispatched Cho Yong-eun first, Chang Duk-soo second, and Yi Gwang-su third to Japan to urge Korean international students in Japan to rise up for the independence movement. Cho Yong-eun arrived in Tokyo, Japan, in January 1919, met Korean international students, and informed them that Kim Kyu-sik, the representative of the association, had been dispatched to the Paris Peace Conference. On his way back to Korea, he received a notification that the Tokyo international students had decided to stage an independence movement on February 8, and they entrusted 800 won of urgently collected independence movement funds to Cho Yong-eun to send to Shanghai. Chang Duk-soo carried out his mission in Japan, entered Korea, arrived in Gyeongseong on February 20, and was subsequently arrested by the Japanese Government-General authorities while hiding in Incheon. Yi Gwang-su left Shanghai in January 1919, traveled via Beijing, arrived in Tokyo, Japan, and drafted the February 8 Declaration of Independence for the Korean international students in Japan.

==== Dispatch of Representatives to Other Regions ====
Lyuh Woon-hyung, the leader of the New Korean Youth Association, was dispatched to Manchuria and the Russian Maritime Province. His mission was to inform the independence activists and compatriots staying in these regions about the dispatch of Kim Kyu-sik, the representative of the association, to the Paris Peace Conference, and to explain that this was a golden opportunity for an independence uprising to boost the movement, while simultaneously collecting independence movement funds to send to the delegation, including Kim Kyu-sik in Paris. Lyuh Woon-hyung left Shanghai on January 20, 1919, went first to Jilin Province, Manchuria, and explained to local independence activists, including Yeo Jun, that the Paris Peace Conference was a great opportunity, urging them to start an independence movement. Lyuh Woon-hyung then proceeded to the Russian Maritime Province, met with Yi Dong-nyeong, Park Eun-sik, and Cho Wan-goo who were staying there, informed them of Kim Kyu-sik's dispatch to the Paris Peace Conference, and advised them to send a representative from the Maritime Province as well. He emphasized that this was a golden opportunity for an independence uprising, winning their full support. Many of them promised to come to Shanghai to heavily reinforce the independence movement together.

In addition, during his one-month stay there, Lyuh Woon-hyung met with Kim Yak-yeon, the president of the Kanminhoe Association, and Jeong Jae-myeon, the general manager, and decided to launch a systematic independence movement. Some agreed to come to Shanghai, and they collected independence movement funds. Lyuh Woon-hyung also visited General Radola Gajda (a Czech) then commanding the Allied forces stationed in Siberia, secured his cooperation for the Korean independence movement, and drafted an English manifesto criticizing Japanese aggression and advocating Korean independence. He distributed tens of thousands of copies to the Allied forces, performing promotional activities for the independence movement. The activities of the New Korean Youth Association from November 1918 to February 1919 formed a core source for the drastic leap of the March First Movement and the independence movement in 1919, carrying out a tremendously significant operation.

=== Establishment of the Shanghai Provisional Government ===
Immediately after the March First Movement, the New Korean Youth Association played a leading role in establishing the Provisional Government of the Republic of Korea, which was organized in Shanghai from April 10 to 11. When the members whom the association had dispatched to various regions to instigate the March First Movement all returned to Shanghai in late March, the association set up a temporary independence office in the French Concession and began to discuss the establishment of the Provisional Government in earnest on April 1. Among the members, there were arguments like Cho Yong-eun's to 'establish a provisional government,' and arguments like Lyuh Woon-hyung's that 'the title of a provisional government is exaggerated, so let us organize a new grand political party.' However, since the majority wanted to establish a provisional government, they eventually pushed forward with its establishment. As promised to Lyuh Woon-hyung in Manchuria and the Maritime Province, numerous leading independence activists gathered in Shanghai. On April 10, 1919, 29 leading independence activists from various regions, including Manchuria and the Maritime Province, gathered in the Shanghai French Concession to hold the first Provisional Legislative Assembly meeting, and 9 of them were members of the New Korean Youth Association. The executives of the association were highly active in the first Assembly of the Shanghai Provisional Government. In the executive branch as well, Kim Kyu-sik, the representative of the association, participated as the Minister of Foreign Affairs, while other executives participated at the vice-ministerial level due to their young age.

To put it simply, the Shanghai Provisional Government initially possessed the characteristic of being organized with former senior members of the Shinminhoe at the ministerial level and executives of the New Korean Youth Association at the vice-ministerial level, and this system continued until the reorganization and establishment of the unified Provisional Government in September 1919. Afterward, the New Korean Youth Association always took a stance of supporting and defending the Provisional Government. Even during the National Representatives Conference in 1923, except for Kim Kyu-sik and his wife Kim Soon-ae, who were elected as top executives of the Creationist faction, almost all members, including Lyuh Woon-hyung, joined the Renovationist faction. They strongly opposed the dissolution of the Provisional Government and advocated for its reinforcement and development through renovation.

=== Voluntary Dissolution ===
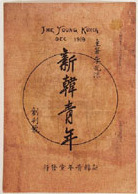
The cover of the inaugural issue of "The New Korean" 《신한청년》, the organ magazine of the New Korean Youth Association organized in Shanghai, China, in December 1919. The editor-in-chief was Yi Gwang-su.

From December 1, 1919, the New Korean Youth Association began to edit and publish "The New Korean" 《신한청년》 as its official organ magazine. In addition, the association reorganized and strengthened the conventional 'Shanghai Korean Residents Fellowship Association' to found the 'Shanghai Korean Residents Association.' Lyuh Woon-hyung served as the leader and Sunwoo Hyuk as the general manager, working for Korean independence and the rights of residents. In August 1920, when a U.S. congressional delegation visited Beijing, the association's members, along with figures from the Provisional Government, met them to conduct diplomatic activities requesting support for Korean independence. Further, in January 1922, when the 'Conference of the Toilers of the Far East' (also known as the Far Eastern Revolutionary Organizations Conference), hosted by the Third International, was held in Moscow, Soviet Union, the association dispatched Kim Kyu-sik and Lyuh Woon-hyung as representatives to gain external support for the Provisional Government. In November 1922, upon the proposal of member Kim Gu, the association founded the Korean Labor-Soldier Association to push forward with capability-building projects for an independence war.

However, in mid-December 1922, the New Korean Youth Association decided to voluntarily dissolve in Shanghai. The reason was that foreign countries often confused the diplomatic activities of the association with those of the Provisional Government, resulting in frequent confusion between the association and the Provisional Government itself. Consequently, elders within the Provisional Government requested the dissolution of the association. In particular, since Kim Kyu-sik, who was dispatched to the Paris Peace Conference as the representative of the association, came to concurrently serve as the representative of Korea and the Minister of Foreign Affairs for the Provisional Government, foreigners who did not know the detailed situation in Korea frequently confused the two organizations. The fact that both the New Korean Youth Association and the Provisional Government were located in Shanghai also acted as a factor in the confusion. In mid-December 1922, the members of the association held a meeting at the house of Seo Byung-ho, and although there were some opposing opinions, they resolved to accept the Provisional Government's request for dissolution, and dissolved in December 1922.

== Evaluation ==
The independence movement of the New Korean Youth Association since its founding formed the initial source of the March First Movement, dispatched a representative to the Paris Peace Conference, advised Korean international students in Japan to hold the February 8 Declaration of Independence, and advised the holding of the Korean Declaration of Independence Conference in Nikolsk, the Russian Maritime Province, on February 25, 1919. They also advised the dispatch of a representative from the Maritime Province to the Paris Peace Conference, encouraged the enhancement of the independence movement in the Maritime Province, provided the catalyst for organizing the Korean National Association and enhancing the independence movement in North Jiandao, and created the catalyst for publishing the Muo Declaration of Independence. They created the catalyst for the establishment of the Provisional Government of the Republic of Korea from April 10 to 11, 1919, actively participated in the early Provisional Government, and also led the organization of the Korean Residents Association in Shanghai and the Korean Labor-Soldier Association. In addition, the New Korean Youth Association carried out active independent diplomatic activities toward various conferences and delegations in China, the United States, and the Soviet Union. The number of members of the association in Shanghai was only about 50, which had limitations in terms of scale. However, because it encompassed the essence of young and mature independence activists, it was able to achieve such great results.

== See also ==
- Dongjesa
- Provisional Government of the Republic of Korea
- February 8 Declaration of Independence
- March First Movement
- Lyuh Woon-hyung
- Kim Kyu-sik
- Sunwoo Hyuk
- Yi Kwang-su
- Chang Tŏksu
- Cho Dong-ho
- Seo Byung-ho
- Kim Chul
- Korean Labor-Soldier Association
