= Jeong In-bo =

Korean historian (1893–1950)

- 정인보
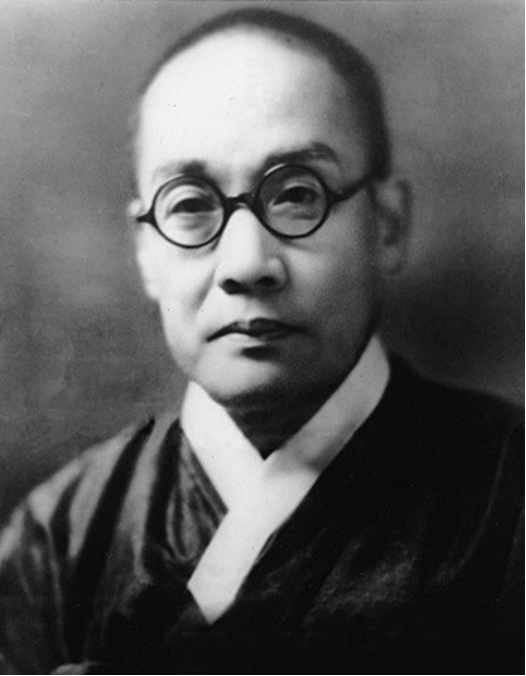
- Born: May 6, 1893; Seoul, South Korea
- Died: Around 1950; North Korea
- Resting place: Seoul National Cemetery
- Occupations: Scholar, independence activist, historian, writer, politician
- Writing career
- Pen name: Tamwon, Widang
- Notable works: 『양명학연론』 (Expositions of Yangmingism), 『여유당전서』 (Collective Works of Yeoyudang), 『조선사연구』 (Studies of Korean History)

Jeong In-bo (Korean: 정인보; Hanja: 鄭寅普; Korean pronunciation: [tɕʌŋ.in.bo]; June 19, 1893 – 1950?), or Chŏng In-bo, was a scholar of Yangmingism and Silhak, independence activist, and historian in pursuit of defining and tracing independent “Koreanness” in the context of Japanese rule. Jeong was involved in politics in the early years of South Korea after liberation, serving as a committee member of the Representative Democratic Council and later as the chair of the Board of Inspection in the government of the Republic of Korea under President Syngman Rhee. During the Korean War, Jeong was abducted to North Korea and is believed to have died there.

== Biography ==
=== Early life ===
Jeong In-bo was born in 1893, into a prestigious family as the grandson of Jeong Won-yong, Yeonguijeong in the era of King Heonjong and the only son of Jeong Eun-jo, who served as a government official at the Jeong 3-pum status. In his early years, Jeong studied under Lee Keon-bang, a renowned Confucian scholar specializing in Yangmingism.

=== Death ===
With the outbreak of the Korean War, Jeong was abducted to North Korea and is believed to have died there. In 1990, Jeong was posthumously awarded the Order of Merit for National Foundation in the third grade, i.e., the Independence Medal, by the Korean government. In the next year, his spirit tablet was placed in the Seoul National Cemetery. In 2001, Yonsei University dedicated its Second Humanities Building to Jeong In-bo in honor of his achievements, naming it Widang Hall after his pen name.

== Career ==
=== Early career ===
After the Japan-Korea Treaty of 1910, Jeong came and went between Shanghai, China, and Korea and joined in the foundation of a mutual aid society for the independence of Korea named Dongjesa) along with other young scholars such as Sin Chaeho, Park Eun-sik, Shin Gyu-sik, and Kim Kyu-sik. After returning to Korea following the death of his wife, Jeong began teaching Hanja literature, Korean history, and Korean literature at Yonhi College (later Yonsei University). He also served as an editorial writer of The Dong-a Ilbo. When Sunjong of Korea died, Jeong wrote an epitaph for the imperial tomb of Yureung in honor of the deceased.

=== In the 1930s ===
In the 1930s, Jeong continued writing for Dong-a Ilbo. The examples include Reading of Classic Works of Joseon (조선고전해제, 1931)^{,} and Exposition of Yangmingism (양명학연론, 1933), and Joseon's Five Thousand Years of Ol/Spirits(오천 년간 조선의 얼, 1935–36). In Reading of Classic Works of Joseon (조선고전해제, 1931), Jeong introduced various classics from Joseon. In Exposition of Yangmingism (양명학연론, 1933), Jeong traced the history of Yangmingism in the Joseon period. In addition, in the serialized essay for Dong-a Ilbo, Joseon's Five Thousand Years of Ol/Spirits (오천 년간 조선의 얼, 1935–36), Jeong delved into the history of “Koreanness” in the history of Joseon. Through this series, along with his other works, he aimed to awaken Koreans to their rediscovery of “Koreanness” under Japanese rule. This attempt spread into Joseonhak Movement (조선학운동) led by Ahn Chai-hong, where the independence of Korean history and culture was revisited through the history of Silhak. Jeong and Ahn participated in republishing the Collective Works of Yeoyudang(여유당전서, 1938). This book consisted of the complete written records of Chŏng Yagyong, a philosopher from the late Joseon period who is considered as a crucial figure in Silhak.

=== After Liberation ===
Following the liberation of Korea from Japanese rule, Jeong served as the chair of a subcommittee of the National Committee on Educational Planning (조선교육심의회), also known as the Bureau of Education, which commenced its operations in September 1945 under the United States Army Military Government in Korea. In the next year, Jeong served as a committee member of the Representative Democratic Council and published Studies of Korean History (조선사연구, 1935–36), which included contents from his serialized essay Joseon's Five Thousand Years of Ol/Spirits (오천 년간 조선의 얼, 1935–36). In 1947, Jeong held the position of dean at Kukhak College(now integrated into Korea University). After the formal establishment of the Republic of Korea, Jeong became the chair of the Board of Inspection under President Syngman Rhee. However, he resigned from that position shortly after a year.

== Legacy ==
=== Joseonhak Movement ===
Korean historians of the 1930s are described as belonging to three groups: (i) Chindan Hakhoe (진단학회)’s empirical approach to history validating primary sources, (ii) socio-political interpretation heavily influenced by Marxism to refute the Japanese view of Korean history put forth by Paek Nam-un, and (iii) a group of nationalist historians led by Jeong In-bo. This third group, or the nationalist historians, formed the core of the Joseonhak Movement, also known as the “Korean Studies Movement.” Against the backdrop of Korea under Japanese rule, Jeong urged for the clarification and development of an independent national culture based on the concept of “Koreanness”, i.e., the ideological foundation of nationalism. According to Jeong's ideals, the discovery of an independent national identity would help Korea to overcome the dominating Japanese colonial ideologies in fields such as culture and history. For instance, in the essay Five Thousand Years of Korea's Ol/Spirit, Jeong writes as follows: “although I am not a historian, upon reading just one or two pages of the Japanese-written history books, I found it so difficult to suppress my rage at their cunning distortion that I began to write the book as an attempt to find Korea's spirit.” In the effort towards the Korean spirit(Ol) or true Koreanness, the Joseonhak Movement delved into the history of Korean thoughts through its historical research and shed light on the history of Silhak in the late Joseon period. Silhak highlighted practical and reality-focused aspects, which contrasted with the dominating framework of Cheng-Zhu School of Neo-Confucianism in the Joseon Period that instead drifted into metaphysical structures. Silhak was an important marker for Jeong because of its nature as the resisting response to the extrinsic thoughts- a dynamic that Jeong considered as necessary to rediscover for his time.

=== Exposition of Yangmingism (양명학연론, 1933) ===
Jeong In-bo was influenced by his teacher Lee Keon-bang's Yangmingism. Lee led Jeong to follow the succession of later Joseon's Soron and a particular sector of Yangmingism called Ganghwa School (Ganghwa-hakpa). The Exposition of Yangmingism, or Yangmyeonghak-Yeonron, was first serialized in Donga Ilbo in 1933. Its diverse sections were later published under different names such as Discussions of Damwon's Studies of Korean History(Damwon-gukhak-sango,담원국학산고(薝園國學散藁))^{[2]}, Exposition of Yangmingism(Yangmyeonghak-yeonron,양명학연론), and The Entire Collection of Damwon Jeong In-bo(Damwon-Jeonginbo-Jeonjib, 담원정인보전집(薝園鄭寅普全集)). Despite their different names, they allcontained the same contents, i.e., introductory descriptions of what Yangmingism is and the history of Yangmingism in Korea and some other Chinese regions. The series Exposition of Yangmingism (양명학연론,1933) is the first record of the historical succession of Yangmingism in Korea. Like the Joseonhak Movement, it was Jeong's another attempt to call for attention to the old thoughts of late Joseon period that, according to Jeong, provided a fresh perspective for the pursuit of liberation in the context of the colonization.

=== Collective Works of Yeoyudang (여유당전서, 1938) ===
Collective Works of Yeoyudang (여유당전서, 1938) refers to the oeuvre of the late-Joseon thinker Yeoyudang, the pen name of Chŏng Yagyong. Its publication process began in 1934 as a project to commemorate the 100-year anniversary of Yeoyudang's death. For this project, Jeong In-bo and Ahn Chai-hong participated for proofreading. This work took five years in total. Sinjoseonsa, a publishing company, published the entire collection comprising a total of 154 books in 1938. Park Seok-moo, the head of the Institute of Dasan (another pen name of Jeong Yak-yong) Studies, comments that this collection “is the entirety of Dasanhak, or studies of Dasan, which proposes possible ways to remedy the corrupt world [at the time in the late Joseon Dynasty].” The publication of Collective Works of Yeoyudang (여유당전서, 1938) marked the starting point of the Joseonhak Movement, with emphasis on Yeoyudang as a pivotal figure in Silhak and in advocacy of genuine "Koreanness" in the face of Japanese colonization.

=== Songs ===
Jeong In-bo wrote lyrics for songs that commemorated significant dates in the history of South Korea such as Korean National Days. The songs include the Song of the March 1st Movement (Samiljeol Song), the Song of Constitution Day (Jeheonjeol Song), the Song of National Liberation Day (Gwangbokjeol Song), and the Song of National Foundation Day (Gaecheonjeol Song). Additionally, Jeong composed lyrics for the Chosun Christian University Song (Chosun Christian University is the original name for Yonsei University).

== See also ==
- Yangmingism
- Silhak
- Korea under Japanese Rule
- Ahn Chai-hong
