= Diocese of Korea (Russian Orthodox Church) =

Diocese for both North and South Korea

Location
- Territory: South Korea; North Korea
- Ecclesiastical province: Patriarchal Exarchate in South-East Asia

Statistics
- Parishes: 6 in South Korea, 1 in North Korea (2025)

Information
- Denomination: Eastern Orthodox Church
- Rite: Byzantine
- Established: 26 February 2019
- Language: Church Slavonic, Korean, English

Current leadership
- Parent church: Russian Orthodox Church
- Bishop of Korea: Theophanes (Kim)

Website
- churchkr.com

The Diocese of Korea (Russian: Корейская епархия; Korean: 대한교구; Hanja: 大韓教區) is a diocese of the Russian Orthodox Church which covers the territory of Korea. It is part of the Patriarchal Exarchate in South-East Asia.

== History ==
=== Eastern Orthodoxy in the region ===
The Convention of Peking in 1860 created a short border between Korea and Russia, thereby improving relations between Korea and Russia. The history of Eastern Orthodoxy in Korea was started when the Russian Empire decided to send Russian Orthodox missionaries to Korea.

On the other hand, Orthodox Church in Japan was also belonged to Russian Orthodox Church. Therefore Japanese occupation of Korea resulted persecution of Orthodox Christian believers but did not wholly terminate relations between Russian Orthodox Church and Eastern Orthodoxy in Korea. The Liberation of Korea terminated relations between Orthodox Church in Japan and Orthodox Church in Korea. Furthermore, the Division of Korea cut Russia-South Korean relations. Therefore the Korean Orthodox Christian believers in South Korea decided to establish relations with Ecumenical Patriarchate of Constantinople or Greek Orthodox church.

Because Eastern Orthodoxy was a minor religion, and the North Korean authorities did not like religions, Russian Orthodox Church in North Korea was also suspended.

The Dissolution of the Soviet Union created the Russian Orthodox Church's interests in South Korea and North Korea.

In 2002, Kim Jong-il decided to construct an Eastern Orthodox church in North Korea. Therefore the Church of the Life-Giving Trinity was established. The North Korean Orthodox community established relations with the Russian Orthodox Church and Ecumenical Patriarchate of Constantinople.

The Korean Orthodox Church opposed and condemned the Russian Orthodox Church's interests in South Korea and Russian church's jurisdictional claim on Orthodox church in North Korea.

After the 2018 Moscow–Constantinople schism, the Russian Orthodox Church formally opened new churches in South Korea and established the Diocese of Korea on 26 February 2019 by the Holy Synod of the Russian Orthodox Church.

== Ruling bishops ==
- Sergius (Chashin) (26 February — 4 April 2019) locum tenens
- Theophanes (Kim) (since 4 April 2019)
