= Seo Dong-won =

- Hangul: 서동원
- RR: Seo Dongwon
- MR: Sŏ Tongwŏn

Seo Dong-won, a Korean name consisting of the family name Seo and the given name Dong-won, may refer to:

- Seo Dong-won (footballer born 1973)
- Seo Dong-won (footballer born 1975)
