= Eastern Orthodoxy in Korea =

Eastern Orthodox Christianity in Korea

"Adversity and Advance: The Experience of the Orthodox Church of Korea". Studies in World Christianity. 16 (3). Eastern Orthodoxy in Korea consists of two Eastern Orthodox churches in Korea: the Diocese of Korea of the Russian Orthodox Church, which operates as a diocese within the Patriarchal Exarchate in South-East Asia (PESEA), and the Orthodox Metropolis of Korea, a diocese of the Ecumenical Patriarchate.

== Historical background ==
=== Early Russian Mission (1856–1945) ===
The missionary activity of the Russian Orthodox Church among the Koreans began in 1856 when St. Innocent (Venyaminov), sent Orthodox missionaries to the southern Ussuri region because of an inflow of Korean settlers. Later many of these settlers returned to Korea, and the group that returned formed the first flock of the Russian Spiritual Mission in Korea.

The Mission began functioning on the Korean peninsula in February 1900, reached its peak in 1917, and thereafter fell into decline when funding was cut off following the October Revolution. The Mission continued its activities during the period from 1910 to 1945 when Korea was a colony of the Empire of Japan, remaining loyal to the Moscow Patriarchate. However, the Mission's work was suspended in 1949 for political reasons. The South Korean authorities seized the Mission's property and banished its head, Archimandrite Polycarp (Priymak).

== South Korea ==
=== Affiliation with the Ecumenical Patriarchate (1955–2004) ===
In December 1955, the Orthodox community in Seoul requested to come under the jurisdiction of the Ecumenical Patriarchate of Constantinople, and the Ecumenical Patriarch, Athenagoras I, accepted the request. Pastoral care of the church in Korea was first entrusted to the Archdiocese of Australia, then transferred to the Archdiocese of North and South America, then to the Metropolis of New Zealand.

In April 2004, the Ecumenical Patriarchate established the Metropolis of Korea.

=== Recent developments and Russian Exarchate (2019–present) ===
In February 2019, the Russian Orthodox Church formally decided to resume missionary activities in Korea. One reason for this decision was the long-term trend of a significant influx of Russian-speaking people in South Korea, prompting a need to open new parishes. The other reason was the 2018 Moscow-Constantinople schism, which led to the severing of full communion between the two churches. The person appointed as the first head and archbishop of the Russian Orthodox diocese of Korea within the PESEA is the ethnically Korean-Russian archbishop Theophanes.

== North Korea ==
In North Korea, the Korean Orthodox Committee operates the Church of the Life-Giving Trinity (Pyongyang), completed in 2006 with Russian assistance. The church reportedly serves the small Orthodox community in Pyongyang and operates under supervision of state authorities and the Russian Orthodox Church.

== See also ==
- Christianity in Korea
- Catholic Church in Korea
- 2018 Moscow–Constantinople schism
