= South Korea–Uzbekistan relations =

Diplomatic relations between South Korea and the Republic of Uzbekistan

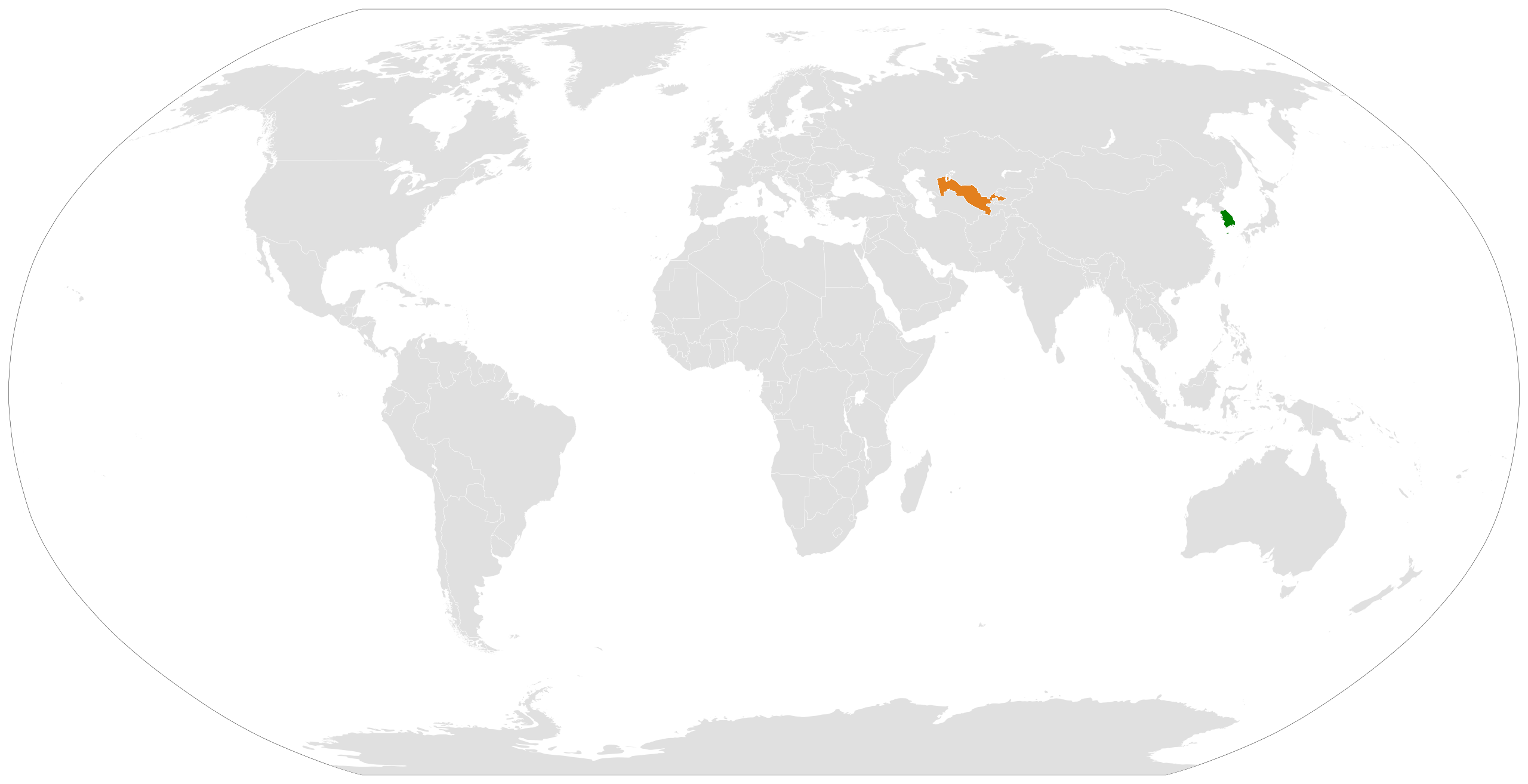

- South Korea: Uzbekistan

Diplomatic mission
- Embassy of South Korea, Tashkent: Embassy of Uzbekistan, Seoul

Envoy
- South Korean Ambassador to Uzbekistan Heesang Kim: Uzbekistani Ambassador to South Korea Vitaly Fen

South Korea–Uzbekistan relations are the international relations between South Korea and Uzbekistan.

South Korea became the first country in the Asia-Pacific region to recognize independence of Uzbekistan in December 1991. Diplomatic relations between the two countries were established in January 1992. Bilateral relations have grown steadily since that time. Cooperation between the two nations has grown in political, economic, and educational spheres.

== History ==
South Korea and Uzbekistan formally established diplomatic relations in January 1992. Soon thereafter South Korea opened its embassy in Tashkent, and Uzbekistan opened its embassy in Seoul.

Uzbek president Islam Karimov made eight official visits to South Korea, in 1992, 1995, 1999, 2006, 2008, 2010, 2012 and 2015. During his visit to South Korea in 2006, Karimov was awarded the title of Honorary Citizen of Seoul, by then Mayor of Seoul Lee Myung-bak. In 1994, South Korean president Kim Young-sam visited Uzbekistan. In 2004, President Roh Moo-hyun visited Uzbekistan. His successor, Lee Myung-bak, visited Uzbekistan twice in 2009 and 2011. President Park Geun-hye visited Uzbekistan in 2014 where she and President Karimov signed several agreements to strengthen economic and investment cooperation and technology exchange between the two countries.

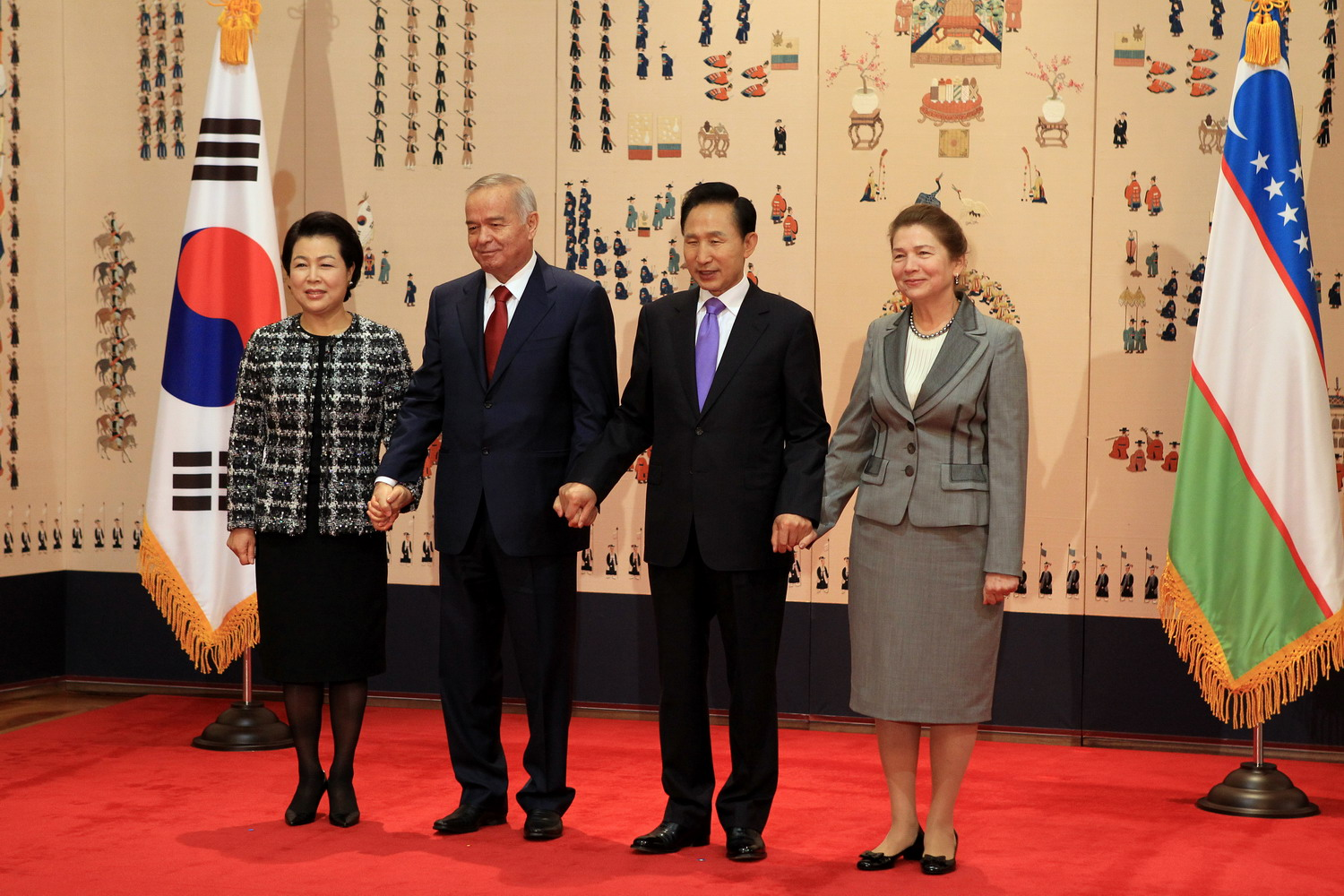
Uzbek President Islam Karimov, Karimov's wife (right) and South Korean President Lee Myung-bak, 11 February 2010

In 2016, North Korea was forced to close its embassy in Tashkent and North Korean diplomats left Uzbekistan. According to KBS News, this happened due to lobbying by the South Korean government in convincing Uzbek government to terminate and curtail diplomatic relations with North Korea in the country, following the January 2016 North Korean nuclear test. There were also reports that claiming the Chinese Embassy in Uzbekistan would represent North Korea's interests in Uzbekistan, but these reports were not confirmed by the Chinese Embassy in Uzbekistan.

In 2017, Karimov's successor Shavkat Mirziyoyev visited South Korea for a four-day visit, where he met with South Korean President Moon Jae-in. At a ceremony of a South Korea-Uzbekistan business forum, a wide range of issues on bilateral agenda were discussed including the prospects for further development of interstate relations in political, trade-economic, financial-investment, scientific-technical, cultural-humanitarian and other spheres, exchange views on regional and international issues. During his visit, Mirziyoyev was also awarded the title of Honorary Citizen of Seoul by mayor Park Won-soon. In 2019, President Moon Jae-in visited Uzbekistan on a four-day state visit, where he met with President Miriziyoyev. Including discussions on advancing bilateral ties, President Moon addressed the joint session of Oliy Majlis and attended the opening ceremony of the House of Korean Culture and Art in Tashkent.

== Economic relations ==
Uzbekistan is South Korea's largest trading partner in Central Asia. Following the 2005 Andijan unrest, which led to the United States and European Union placing trade and economic sanctions against Uzbekistan, South Korea along with China, Japan and Russia continued economic and trade relations with Uzbekistan, with no demands on human rights.

In 2006, South Korea and Uzbekistan signed a declaration on strategic partnership, which they agreed to develop and deepen further in a new Joint Declaration signed during President Park Geun-hye's visit to Tashkent in 2014. During President Karimov's visit to South Korea in 2015, 60 documents relating to trade, investment, economic and technical cooperation and other spheres were signed, at a total worth of US$7.7 billion. In 2015, bilateral trade turnover between the countries exceeded US$1.7 billion, corresponding to 50 percent of South Korea's trade with Central Asian republics.

In 2009, Korean Air Cargo took over the management of Navoiy International Airport and, under the 10-year development plan, further accelerated the modernization program. Construction of the largest air cargo terminal in Central Asia that can handle 100,000 tonnes of cargo annually using latest equipment. In August 2010, Hanjin Group, the parent of Korean Air, inaugurated the cargo terminal at Navoi, which now serves as the intercontinental logistics center from Central Asia. South Korea has been active in numerous projects and programs in different regions of Uzbekistan, including the free economic zones at Navoi and Angren.

In 2016, South Korean Prime Minister Hwang Kyo-ahn visited Uzbekistan, where he joined then Prime Minister of Uzbekistan Shavkat Mirziyoyev in the inauguration of the largest bilateral cooperation project, the Ustyurt Gas Chemical Complex in Karakalpakstan. The cost of the project was US$4 billion.

South Korea and Uzbekistan also founded the joint venture LG CNS Uzbekistan in 2015, to support the implementation of information systems and databases for E-Government in order to facilitate the mobility of people, business and government system in Uzbekistan. Uzbekistan and South Korea have also agreed on training programs, under which thousands of representatives of Uzbek small and medium-size businesses annually work and receive training in Korean enterprises and companies.

As of 2019, Uzbekistan is South Korea's third largest partner in emerging Europe and Central Asia, with trade reaching $2.36 billion and South Korean investment in Kazakhstan and Uzbekistan exceeding $7 billion. Uzbekistan is also the third largest training partner among countries in the Commonwealth of Independent States, after Russia and Kazakhstan. South Korea primarily exports vehicles, machinery, construction material and equipment, while Uzbekistan exports natural resources and agricultural products.

In April 2019, South Korean President Moon Jae-in made a state visit to Tashkent. After a meeting between Deputy Prime Minister of Uzbekistan Elyor Ganiyev and Deputy Prime Minister of South Korea Hong Nam-ki, South Korea and Uzbekistan have agreed to work on implementing a free trade agreement to expand bilateral economic and trade relations. In March 2020, the two countries met for a virtual conference to organize a joint study on bilateral free trade, with the feasibility study concluding in November 2020.

In November 2020, South Korea and Uzbekistan met during the 13th Central Asia-South Korea Cooperation Forum in Seoul, in which they discussed the consequences and opportunities for economic cooperation in the context of the COVID-19 pandemic, as well as the removal of remaining barriers to trade and improving product quality and competitiveness. In January 2021, the countries declared the start of discussions for a bilateral free trade agreement to be called the "Agreement for Sustainable Trade and Economic Partnership" (STEP).

On June 14, 2024, Uzbekistan and South Korea finalized a US$196 million deal for Korea Train Express (KTX) technology to be applied in Uzbekistan. This was the first time KTX technology was exported. As part of the deal, 42 train units capable of going up to 250 km/h (160 mph) were to be supplied for 1,216 km (756 mi) of rail in Uzbekistan. Operations were scheduled to begin in April 2027.

In May 2025, South Korea and Uzbekistan deepened their economic cooperation with the awarding of a major infrastructure contract to Incheon International Airport Corporation (IIAC). Following an open international tender launched in August 2024, IIAC was selected to manage and modernize Urgench Airport in Uzbekistan’s Khorezm region. The $223 million project, scheduled for completion by 2027, includes the construction of a new runway, upgraded terminals for passengers and cargo, and advanced lighting and signaling systems meeting International Civil Aviation Organization (ICAO) standards. Once completed, the upgraded airport will accommodate larger aircraft such as the Boeing 747 and Airbus A350, and its passenger terminal capacity will increase from 400 to 1,300 passengers per hour.

== Cultural/educational relations ==
Uzbekistan has invited South Korean experts to take positions as deputy minister in the ministry for development of information technologies and communications, as well vice rectors at several universities. In 2014, South Korea's Inha University opened a branch in Tashkent, which focuses on computer sciences and high-tech engineering and gives all courses in English.

Yeoju Institute of Technology opened the Yeoju Technical Institute in Tashkent, which became the first private university in Uzbekistan. Courses include areas as architecture and urban planning, civil engineering, alternative energy, business management, tourism, international marketing, international economic relations, primary education, Korean language philology, and aesthetics and dresses’ design.

In 2019, during President Moon Jae-in's visit to Uzbekistan, the Korean Culture and Art House was opened in Tashkent. There are Korean Cultural Centers in Uzbek cities of Samarkand, Bukhara, and Nukus.

== Koryo-saram ==
In the late 1930s thousands of Koreans in the Soviet Union were deported to Central Asia, supposedly to prevent further Japanese espionage. These people are now known as Koryo-sarams. It is estimated that 177,270 ethnic Koreans still live in the territory of Uzbekistan, making it the largest in Central Asia and the fifth largest in the world, after U.S, China, Japan and Canada. The presence of these ethnic Koreans helps to strengthen ties between the two countries.

A monument honoring the Koryo-saram on the 80th anniversary of their deportation from the Soviet Far East to Uzbek SSR was unveiled at Seoul Park in Tashkent. The monument was established by the Korea Culture Association and the Overseas Koreans Foundation in Uzbekistan. The unveiling ceremony of the monument was attended by Mayor of Seoul Park Won-soon and Mayor of Tashkent Rakhmonbek Usmanov. The park itself was a result of the sister city relationship between Seoul and Tashkent which was formalized in 2010. It was opened by then South Korean President Lee Myung-bak during his visit to Uzbekistan in 2009.

== Resident diplomatic missions ==
- South Korea has an embassy in Tashkent.
- Uzbekistan has an embassy in Seoul.

== See also ==
- Koryo-saram
- Foreign relations of South Korea
- Foreign relations of Uzbekistan
