= Emergency National Assembly =

1946–1948 provisional government in Korea

The Emergency National Assembly (Korean: 비상국민회의; Hanja: 非常國民會議) was an organization intended to function as a temporary Korean-run government under the United States Army Military Government in Korea. It was established on February 1, 1946. It initially consisted of a Supreme Council of Political Affairs (최고정무위원회) and a Standing Committee (상임위원회). On February 14, 1946, the Supreme Council was reorganized into the Representative Democratic Council. On February 17, 1947, the assembly was merged with the National Supreme Headquarters for Reunification and National Association and was renamed the National Assembly (국민의회).

The organization was created through the joint efforts of the Provisional Government of the Republic of Korea and the Central Council for the Rapid Realization of Korean Independence. Its opening ceremony was held at Myeongdong Cathedral.
