= Sukhyang jeon =

Korean romance novel

Sukhyang jeon (淑香傳 The Tale of Sukhyang) is a romance novel that details the blossoming love and its realization between Yi Seon and Sukhyang. It is a fictional work that reveals the universal emotions of those living in Joseon and was quite popular and being enjoyed by many. It was later thought to have influenced Yi Kwangsu (1892-1950) Mujeong (무정 Heartless), which was hailed as the first work of modern Korean fiction.

== Authorship ==
The exact date of creation and author of Sukhyang jeon is unknown, but it is presumed to have been written sometime within the seventeenth century. Records indicate that Amenomori Hōshu (1668-1775), a Japanese Confucian scholar, came to Busan in 1702 and used Korean stories, including Sukhyang jeon, in order to learn the Korean language. From this record, we can therefore confirm that Sukhyang jeon existed in the late seventeenth century.

== Plot ==
Kim Jeon, who once saved a turtle from death, and his wife, Lady Jang, were unable to have children for a very long time until one day, they suddenly have a daughter they name Sukhyang. When Sukhyang is five years old, a bandit’s rebellion breaks out, and the family is forced to escape in order to seek refuge. As they evacuate, Kim Jeon and Lady Jang are separated from Sukhyang. With the help of a deer, the newly orphaned Sukhyang makes her way to the home of Jang Seungsang. Sukhyang grows up as the adopted daughter of Jang Seungsang, but one day, she is falsely accused of stealing and get kicked out. Later, Sukhyang attempts to drown herself, but the turtle that her father once saved suddenly appears and rescues her. Afterwards, in another close brush with death, Sukhyang is once more saved by a man named Hwa Deokjin. In another instance, Sukhyang nearly dies from starvation, but an elderly woman named Yi Hwajeong helps her and the two end up living together.

One day, Sukhyang has a dream that she becomes a fairy and is playing in heaven. After she wakes from her dream, she records the scene seen in her dream through embroidery. The elderly woman takes Sukhyang’s embroidery and sells it to a merchant. The merchant visits the writer and master calligrapher, Yi Seon, in order to create a title for the picture embroidered by Sukhyang. Upon seeing the embroidery, Yi Seon is shocked because it exactly reflects his own dream. He then finds Yi Hwajeong and meets Sukhyang, who he marries. However, when Yi Seon’s father, Yi Sangseo, finds out about their marriage, he gives orders to Kim Jeon, the magistrate of Nagyang, to lock up Sukhyang and kill her. Kim Jeon, unaware that Sukhyang is his own daughter, prepares to carry out the orders. However, his wife, Lady Jang has a dream and begs him to release Sukhyang. With the help of Lady Yeo, Yi Seon’s aunt, they manage to free Sukhyang from prison.

Afterwards, Sukhyang formally meets Yi Sangseo and his wife with the help of Yi Hwajeong and a blue dog, and they finally accept her as a daughter-in-law. Yi Seon attains first place in the civil service examination and is appointed as a royal historian, returning to his home and living happily together with Sukhyang. She later accompanies Yi Seon on his trip to Kiangling. On the way, she is reunited with Jang Seungsang and his wife, who took care of her for a short while, and she repays their former kindness. She also reunites with her father and mother and tells them that she is their daughter. Later, Yi Seon brings back an elixir of immortality from Bongnae Mountain on behalf of the Empress Dowager and he is made King of the Chu State for his actions. Yi Seon and Sukhyang enjoy great riches and honors until finally, they decide to return home by ship.

== Features and Significance ==
While Sukhyang jeon can be interpreted as a love story between Sukhyang and Yi Seon, it can also be seen as a female coming of age novel in that it details the process through which a female protagonist (Sukhyang) encounters numerous ordeals and overcomes them. In the story, the hardships faced by Sukhyang are shown to be planned by Heaven and can thus be seen as a kind of “rite of passage.” Yet the journey through which she endures and overcomes such ordeals can also be seen as Sukhyang’s process of self-discovery and inner growth.

Sukhyang receives the help of diverse beings—including a turtle, a man named Hwa Deokjin, an elderly woman named Yi Hwajeong, a dog, and a deer, and by empathizing and interacting with them, she is able to overcome her trials and ordeals. In this sense, Sukhyang jeon sketches a picture of humanity as a being that communicates with the world in order to give and receive help. Moreover, Sukhyang’s story of suffering is very similar to that of Yeongchae, a female character in Yi Kwangsu’s Mujeong. In Mujeong, Yeongchae’s home is ruined and she is forced to go to her grandparents’ home. There, she is abused in numerous ways and falsely accused of stealing, causing her to leave and disguise herself as a man. This scene in particular resembles how Sukhyang was separated from her family due to war, adopted into Jang Seungsang’s home, and then chased out for being falsely accused of stealing, upon which she was forced to disguise herself as a man. Moreover, both Sukhyang jeon and Mujeong feature a dog that accompanies the female protagonist in their wanderings, as well as a scene where the female protagonist reunites with her betrothed. In this manner, Mujeong can be seen as utilizing and building upon the narrative structure and popular influence and mass appeal of Sukhyang jeon.

== Texts ==
There are numerous extant versions of Sukhyang jeon, including a handwritten manuscript in Korean, a woodblock print edition in Korean made in Seoul, a handwritten manuscript in classical Chinese, an edition printed with movable type in Korean, a Japanese translation, as well as an edition stored in Japan. A total of 56 extant copies currently exist, implying the great popularity of Sukhyang jeon. In general, there are no great differences in terms of content between the editions, and it is presumed that the original version was written in Korean.

English translation: Sukhyang's Tale & Sugyong's Tale: Two Romantic Novels from Old Korea. Translated by Sohn Tae-soo, Won-Chung Kim and Christopher Merrill. Homa & Sekey Books, 2023.
