= National Liberation Day of Korea =

National holiday in Korea

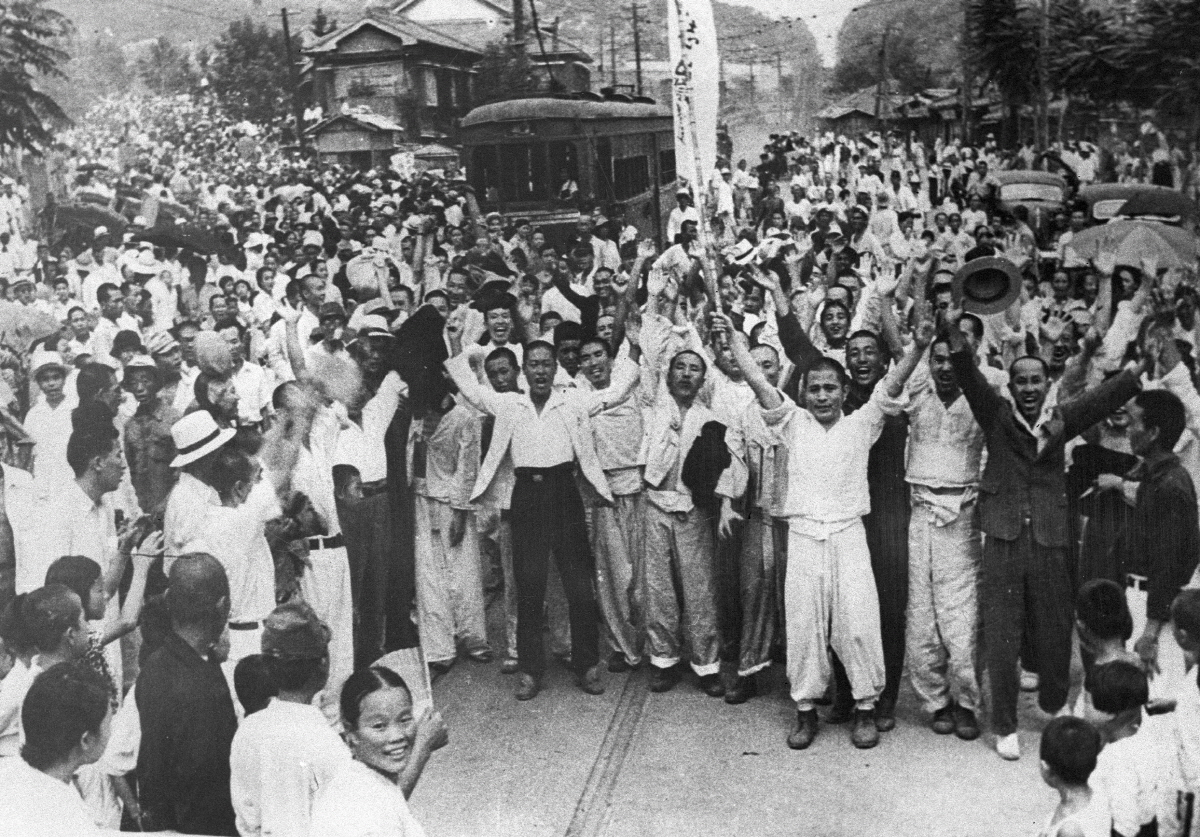
- An iconic photo of the liberation (1945)
- Observed by: Korea; North Korea; South Korea
- Type: National day
- Significance: Commemorates Victory over Japan Day, when Korea was liberated from Japanese colonial rule and the establishment of North and South Korea
- Celebrations: Civilian and military parades, political rallies
- Date: 15 August
- Frequency: Annual

South Korean name
- Hangul: 광복절
- Hanja: 光復節
- Lit.: The Day the Light Returned
- RR: Gwangbokjeol
- MR: Kwangbokchŏl

North Korean name
- Hangul: 조국해방의 날
- Hanja: 祖國解放의 날
- Lit.: Liberation of the Fatherland Day
- RR: Joguk haebangui nal
- MR: Choguk haebangŭi nal

The National Liberation Day of Korea is a public holiday celebrated annually on 15 August in both North Korea and South Korea. It commemorates the day when the Korean Peninsula was liberated by the Allies in 1945 from 35 years of Japanese colonial rule. The day also coincides with the anniversary of the establishment of the South Korean government in 1948. Liberation Day is the only political holiday that is celebrated in both Koreas.

== Names ==
In North Korea, it is known as Choguk haebangŭi nal (조국해방의 날; lit. 'Liberation of the Fatherland Day').

In South Korea, it is known as Gwangbokjeol (Korean: 광복절; Hanja: 光復節; lit. 'The Day the Light Returned'). The name Gwangbokjeol uses the term "restoration" (복; 復; bok) instead of "independence" (독립; 獨立; dongnip) to emphasize that Korea had been independent for millennia prior to Japanese rule.

== History ==
The day marks the annual anniversary of the announcement that Japan would unconditionally surrender on August 15, 1945. All forces of the Imperial Japanese Army were ordered to surrender to the Allies, with the last Japanese occupation troops leaving southern Korea by November 6, 1945. The United States and Soviet Union agreed on a 3-year trusteeship during which they would oversee the establishment of two different national governments for Korea.

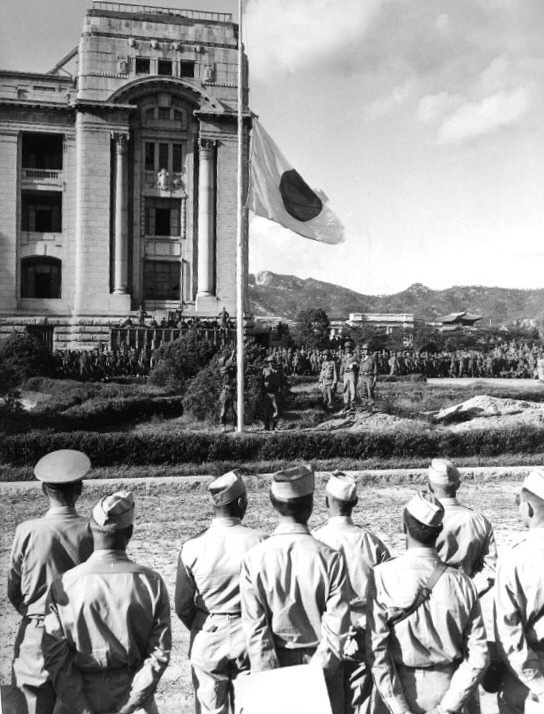
American soldiers lowering the Japanese flag at the former Japanese General Government Building, Seoul on 9 September 1945.

The Korean Peninsula came for the first time in history since its founding in 2333 BC under control by a foreign power in 1910, followed by a 35 year long occupation period, which oversaw the attempt at eradicating the Korean culture and language. On 1 September a provisional government of which the People's Republic of Korea was established by the Committee for the Preparation of the National government (조선건국준비위원회). The negotiations on 15 August between Lyuh Woon-hyung and Endou Ryuusaku, the representative of Nobuyuki Abe, the Governor-General of Chōsen, agreed on the release of all prisoners and the transfer of administrative and judicial control to Korean authorities in return for the guarantee of safe passage for Japanese citizens.

United States troops landed in mid-September and occupied the southern part of the country, declaring the provisional government as invalid.

August 15 is celebrated by many countries as Victory over Japan Day, the day Japan's emperor announced the country's surrender. The United States, however, commemorates this day in September when the Japanese formally signed a declaration of surrender.

== North Korea ==
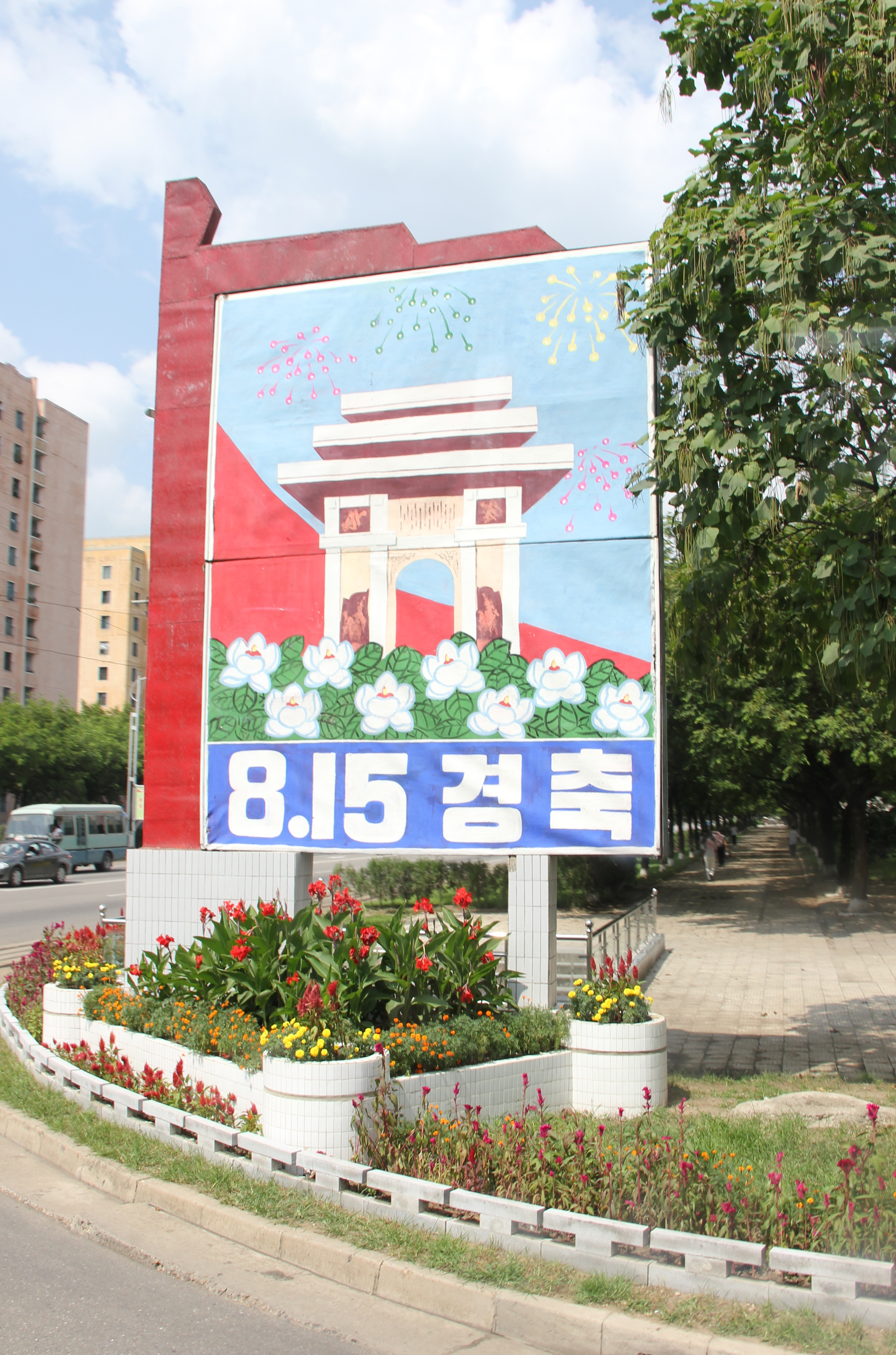
A poster in Pyongyang, depicting the Arch of Triumph

In North Korea, it is typical to schedule weddings on the holiday.

The holiday is often celebrated with a military parade on Kim Il Sung Square on jubilee years (ex: 25th, 40th, 50th, 60th, 70th anniversaries) with the attendance of the Chairman of the State Affairs Commission and Commander-in-Chief of the Armed Forces of North Korea. The first parade was held in 1949 at Pyongyang station. It was held again in 1953, and then conducted every year until 1960, when it took a pause until the early 2000s.

=== 2015 North Korea time zone change ===
On 5 August 2015, the North Korean government decided to change its time zone back to UTC+08:30 effective 15 August 2015, and said the official name would be Pyongyang Time (PYT). The government of North Korea made this decision as a break from imperialism; the time zone change went into effect on the 70th anniversary of the liberation of Korea. North Korea reversed the change in May 2018.

== South Korea ==
=== Public holiday ===
Logo of 80th anniversary of Liberation Day in South Korea (2025)

In South Korea, many activities and events take place on the holiday, including an official ceremony attended by the President of the Republic either at the Independence Hall of Korea in Cheonan or at the Sejong Center for the Performing Arts. During the celebration, the flags of different countries around the world hung in the middle of the road around the Jamsil area of Seoul between the Seoul Olympic Stadium and Olympic Park, Seoul are taken down and replaced with the flag of South Korea.

All buildings and homes are encouraged to display the South Korean national flag Taegukgi. Not only are most public museums and places open free of charge to the descendants of independence activists on the holiday, but they can also travel on both public transport and intercity trains for free.

The official "Gwangbokjeol song" (광복절 노래) is sung at official ceremonies. The song's lyrics were written by Jeong In-bo (정인보) and the melody by Yoon Yong-ha (윤용하). The lyrics speak of "to touch the earth again" and how "the sea dances", how "this day is the remaining trace of 40 years of passionate blood solidified" and to "guard this forever and ever".

The government traditionally issues special pardons on Gwangbokjeol.

=== Assassination attempt ===
At 10:23 a.m., 15 August 1974, Mun Se-gwang, a Zainichi Korean and North Korean sympathizer, attempted to assassinate President Park Chung Hee at the National Theater of Korea in Seoul during a Gwangbokjeol ceremony; Park was unharmed but his wife Yuk Young-soo, the First Lady of South Korea, was killed.

=== De facto inauguration ceremony ===
At 8:00 p.m., 15 August 2025, at Gwanghwamun Square in Seoul, President Lee Jae Myung, who took office on 4 June after winning the 21st presidential election without an official inauguration, held a de facto public inauguration ceremony, dubbed as the "People's Mandate Ceremony", which coincided with the 80th anniversary of the liberation of the Korean peninsula. During the ceremony, he received appointment letters from 80 selected individuals, ranging from prominent figures in democracy, economic growth, science and technology, culture, sports, and ordinary citizens.

== See also ==
- Independence Hall of Korea
- Seodaemun Prison
