= Kim Dong-won =

- Hangul: 김동원
- RR: Gim Dongwon
- MR: Kim Tongwŏn

Kim Dong-won (Korean: 김동원) is a Korean name consisting of the family name Kim and the given name Dong-won, and may also refer to:

- Kim Dong-won (filmmaker, born 1955) (born 1955), South Korean filmmaker
- Kim Dong-won (director, born 1962) (born 1962), South Korean film director
