= Eastern Orthodoxy in North Korea =

Eastern Orthodoxy in the Democratic People's Republic of Korea is a Christian denomination in North Korea, which has developed in the country since 2006.

As of 2011, the number of Orthodox Christians in North Korea is estimated at 50-60 people, which is about 0.0002% of the country's population.

There were no Eastern Orthodox priests in the country, so the Korean Orthodox Committee, established in North Korea in 2002, contacted the Russian Orthodox Church. The committee sent four students to the Moscow Ecclesiastical Seminary in April 2003. All four were freshly baptized Christians who had formerly worked for the North Korean intelligence service. One of them, Feodor Kim (Kim Hoe-il), said it was difficult for them to adopt the Orthodox faith. After the seminary, they were dispatched to Vladivostok to gain practical experience.

Of the Orthodox churches, only the Russian Orthodox Church is represented, which, with the assistance of Kim Jong Il, built the Church of the Life-Giving Trinity in the capital Pyongyang, located in the Jongbaek-dong, Rangrang District.

When the church was consecrated in 2006 by Metropolitan Kirill of Smolensk, the first North Korean priests were ordained - Feodor Kim and John Ra.

On December 28, 2018, the Holy Synod of the Russian Orthodox Church established the Patriarchal Exarchate in Southeast Asia, which included North Korea, and on February 26, 2019, the Korean Diocese was established within the exarchate, which included North and South Korea.

In March 2019, Metropolitan Sergius Chashin noted that

For many years, there has been the Trinity Cathedral there, built by order of the now deceased leader of North Korea, Kim Jong Il. Students from the DPRK have studied at the Moscow Theological Academy and have been ordained to the priesthood. Another group of five people is currently studying at the Khabarovsk Theological Seminary. Patriarch Kirill ordained two of them in Moscow in August 2018... The authorities are very favourable to the Russian Orthodox Church. Our diplomats, as well as employees of the Bulgarian and Romanian embassies, come to the temple and pray. We have no difficulties with North Korea in terms of carrying out our activities

.
