= February 8 Declaration of Independence =

1919 act of the Korean independence movement

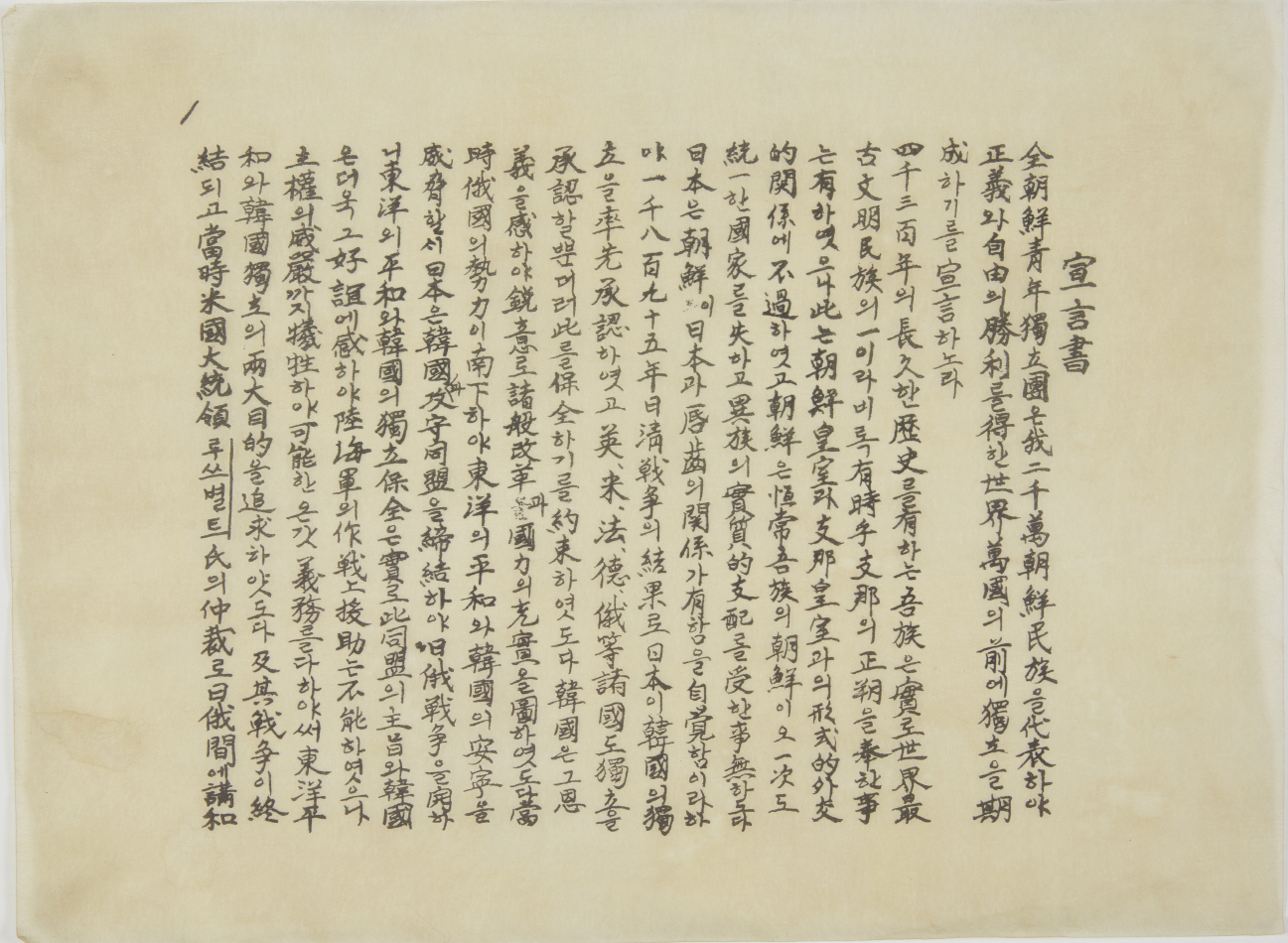
- The first page of a copy of the declaration
- Ratified: February 8, 1919
- Purpose: Declare independence of Korea from Japan

The February 8 Declaration of Independence (Korean: 2·8 독립 선언) was a proclamation made by Korean independence activist organization the Korean Young People's Independence Organization (조선청년독립단; 朝鮮靑年獨立團) in Tokyo, Japan on February 8, 1919. It declared that Korea, then a colony of the Empire of Japan, was an independent state. The document has also been called the Korean Young People's Independence Declaration (조선청년독립선언).

The declaration is widely viewed as a direct predecessor to the significant March 1st Movement, which in turn was a major catalyst of the independence movement.

== Description ==
=== Background ===
From 1910 to 1945, Korea was a colony of the Empire of Japan. Koreans in multiple countries advocated for Korean independence around this time. Resistance from within the Empire began to increase after United States president Woodrow Wilson proclaimed self-determination to be a part of his Fourteen Points to promote global peace. Another event occurred in January 1919 that increased independence sentiment. The former Korean monarch, Gojong, died abruptly, which led to widespread rumors that Gojong had been poisoned by Japan.

=== Declaration ===
Around 2 p.m. on February 8, 1919, 600 Korean students studying in Japan gathered at the Korean YMCA auditorium in Tokyo and proclaimed Korea's independence from Japan. Eleven representatives signed the document. The original declaration was initially written in Korean, then translated into both English and Japanese. These translated copies were given to the press and foreign embassies. In the aftermath of this, 60 Korean students were arrested by Japanese police.

== Legacy ==
This event is viewed as a direct precursor to the March 1st Movement: a nationwide protest that occurred three weeks later in Korea which invigorated the independence movement.

In February 2023, the Independence Hall of Korea announced that an original handwritten English copy of the document had been found. The document was found in materials lent in 2019 by the Korean National Association Memorial Foundation in Los Angeles, United States. A researcher at the Independence Hall stated that it's likely that Yi Gwangsu was the author of the document, and that he had sent it to independence activist Ahn Chang Ho, who led the Korean National Association. The Independence Hall planned to show around 32 original copies of the Declaration in an exhibit for the 104th anniversary of the March 1st Movement.

== See also ==
- Korean Declaration of Independence
