= Photograph of the liberation of Korea =

Photograph depicting Korea's 1945 liberation

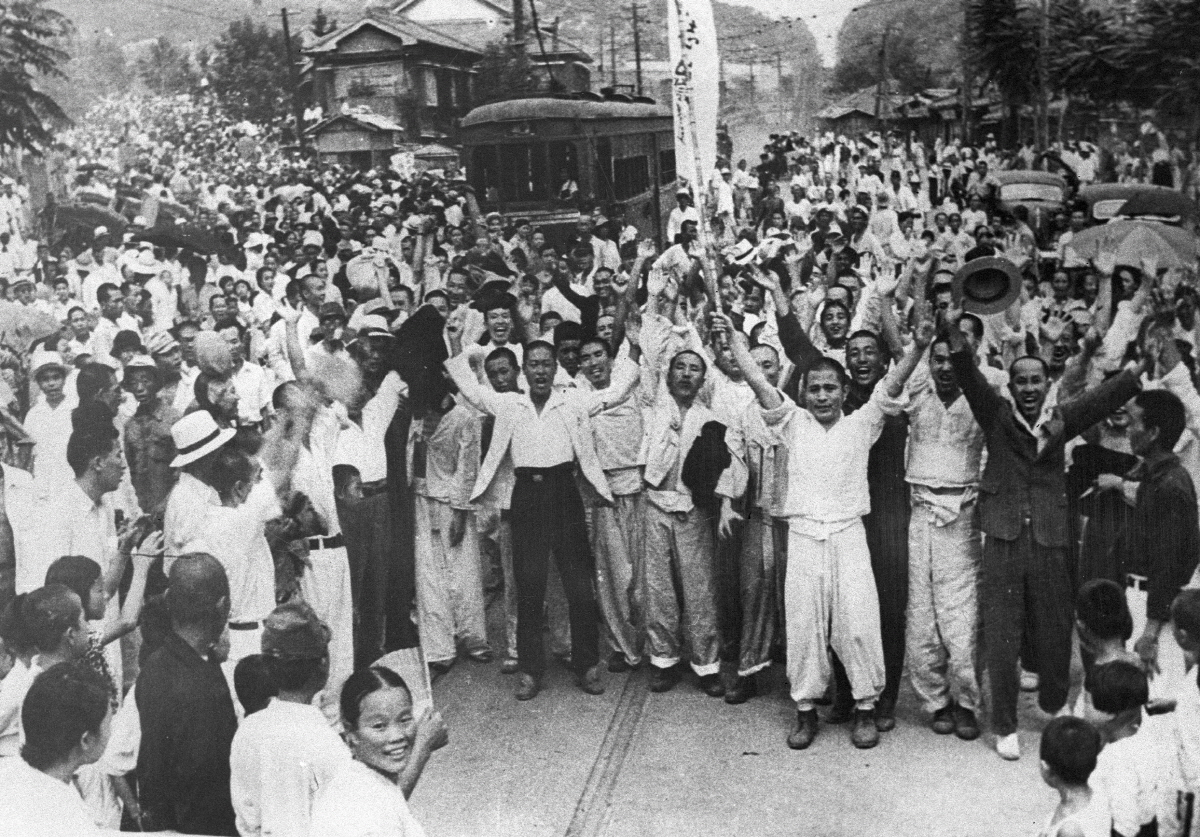
Photograph of people celebrating the liberation of Korea

A photograph of a celebrating crowd has become one of the most popular depictions of the liberation of Korea from Japanese colonial rule in 1945. The photograph was most likely taken on August 16, 1945, a day after the announcement of the surrender of Japan in World War II. It was taken likely at an intersection outside of the infamous Seodaemun Prison in Seoul, and depicts a crowd of people celebrating the liberation and the release of Korean political prisoners.

Various sources give conflicting dates and locations for the photograph. Some sources report the date as August 15, 1945 and the location as Mapo Prison. These claims are believed to be incorrect, based on analyses of the photograph and the historical context.

== Background ==
From 1910 to 1945, Korea was ruled as a colony of the Empire of Japan. Koreans were subjected to harsh exploitation and forced cultural assimilation efforts. Such conditions led to the rise of the Korean independence movement, which resisted Japanese rule from within and outside of Korea. Many independence activists were imprisoned in Seodaemun Prison in the capital city Keijō (Seoul); that prison became infamous for its brutal treatment and extrajudicial killings of prisoners.

In the final years of colonial rule, as the tide of World War II turned against Japan, exploitation and repression of Koreans greatly increased. Such pressure did not ease even in the final months; Koreans were continually warned of an impending Allied invasion of Korea, and to expect to fight until the last man. However, in early August, atomic bombs were dropped on the Japanese cities of Hiroshima and Nagasaki. Days later, on August 15, Japan announced its surrender to the Allies.

The surrender was announced in Korea on the day it happened, but initially the news spread slowly and was met with skepticism. Meanwhile, the Japanese Government-General of Chōsen quietly held a meeting with major Korean politician Lyuh Woon-hyung. Lyuh and the government-general negotiated a number of terms, including the prompt release of Korean political prisoners from Seoul's prisons, including Seodaemun Prison. By the following day, mass public celebrations of the surrender began, and at around 10 am, prisoners began to be released. From Seodaemun Prison, there began a celebratory march from the main entrance of the prison (located to the prison's east, near where the photograph is presumed to have been taken), to the city's central street Jongno.

== Description ==
The photograph was taken possibly by members of the Chosŏn Film Company (조선영화사), who also captured other scenes related to the release of prisoners on this day. It depicts a crowd of Koreans celebrating. Based on the historical circumstances and location, it is assumed that they are celebrating Korea's liberation and the release of political prisoners.

=== Location ===
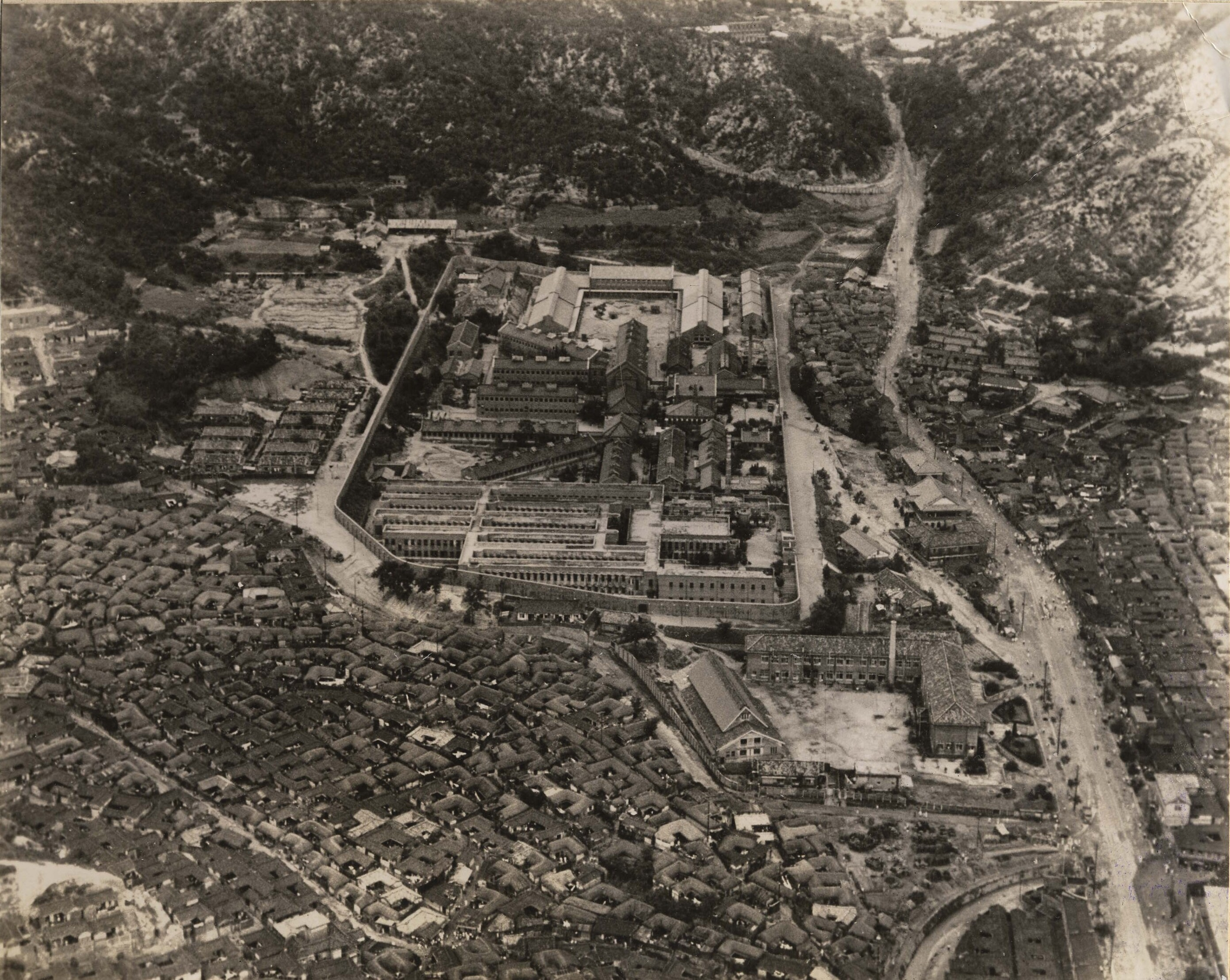
Aerial photograph of Seodaemun Prison taken weeks after the liberation. The photograph of the celebrating crowd was most likely taken at the triangular intersection in the center right of the photograph. The building is in the traffic island and the valley is in the top right of the image.

Sources variously give the location of the photograph as Seodaemun Prison or Mapo Prison. As of 2024, the South Korean National Archives of Korea gives the location of the photo as Mapo Prison. Independence activist Lee Gap-sang claimed to have been depicted in the photo and that the location of the photo is at Mapo Prison.

Several academics and journalists analyzing the features of the photograph determined it to have most likely have been taken at an intersection just east of Seodaemun Prison. Visible in the photo are a building, tram tracks, an intersection, and a valley in the rear; they are all visible in an aerial photograph of Seodaemun Prison taken just weeks later.

=== Date ===
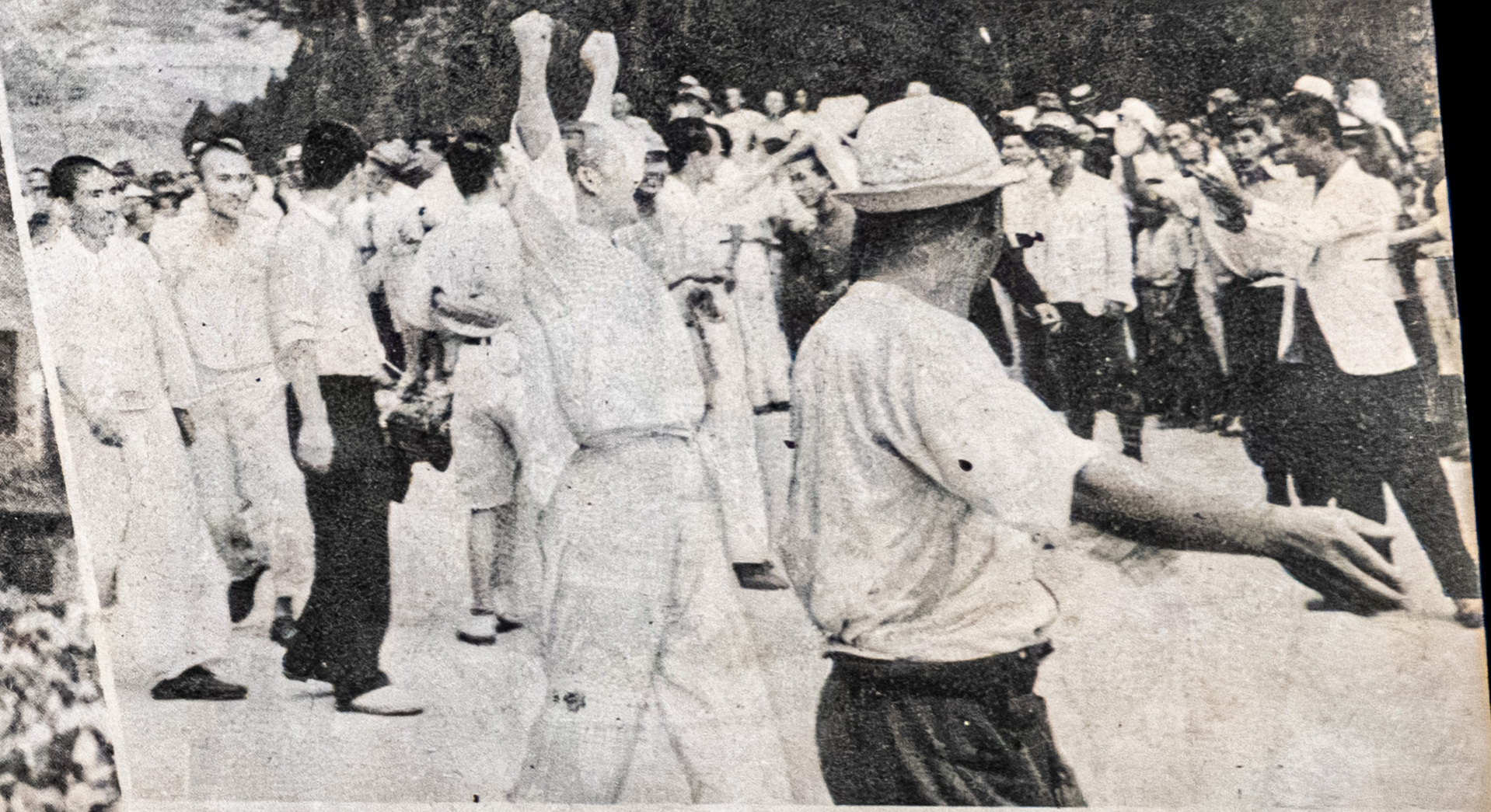
Photograph known to have been taken on August 16, 1945. Several people (notably Seong Gi-seok, leftmost) in this photograph are believed to be the same as several seen in the famous photograph of the liberation.

Sources variously date the photograph to either August 15 or August 16, 1945. Several scholars and journalists have argued that the photograph was almost certainly taken on August 16 around noon; around when the prisoners began to be released. A further piece of evidence in support of the August 16 date is another photograph that is known to have been taken on that day. Several people in that photograph are believed to be the same as several in the famous photograph of the liberation. Those people are also wearing the same clothes in both photographs, which suggests the two photographs were taken fairly close in time.

Visible in both photographs is the independence activist Seong Gi-seok (성기석; 1920–1990). For years before the liberation, Seong and several others made pirate radio broadcasts that spread news of the Korean independence movement and Japan's impending loss in World War II. Seong was eventually caught and put in Seodaemun Prison, where he was subjected to torture. He was released from prison likely shortly before these photographs were taken.
