= Theophanes Kim =

Russian Orthodox Archbishop of Korea

- Archbishop of Korea
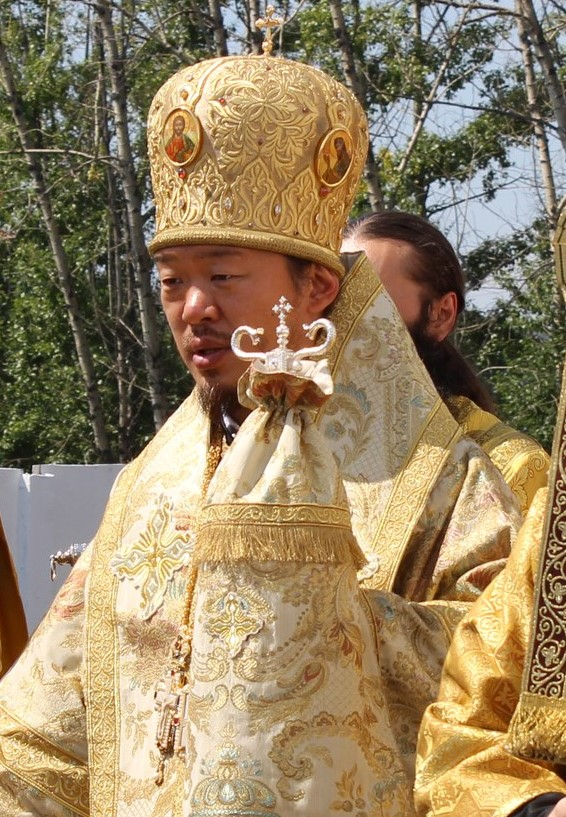
- Bishop Theophanes in 2017
- Native name: Феофан
- Church: Russian Orthodox Church
- Metropolis: Patriarchal Exarchate in South-East Asia
- Diocese: Diocese of Korea (Russian Orthodox Church)
- Appointed: 4 April 2019
- Predecessor: Archbishop of the Russian Orthodox diocese of Korea: office established
- Successor: Archbishop of the Russian Orthodox diocese of Korea: incumbent

Orders
- Rank: Archbishop

Personal details
- Born: Alexei Illarionovich Kim; January 19, 1976 (age 50) Yuzhno-Sakhalinsk, Sakhalin oblast, Russian SFSR, Soviet Union
- Denomination: Eastern Orthodox Church

Archbishop Theophanes (Russian: Архиепископ Феофан, secular name Alexei Illarionovich Kim, Russian: Алексей Илларионович Ким; born January 19, 1976) is a bishop of the Russian Orthodox Church; he is the Archbishop of the Russian Orthodox diocese of Korea of the Patriarchal Exarchate in South-East Asia.

He is the first Eastern Orthodox bishop of Korean ancestry.

== Life ==
=== Early life ===
He was born on 19 January, 1976 in the city of Yuzhno-Sakhalinsk into a Sakhalin Korean family. He attended school in Yuzhno-Sakhalinsk, graduating from the Vostochny Lyceum in 1993. Alexei continued his education at the Yuzhno-Sakhalinsk branch of the Moscow Commercial Institute, graduating in 1997.

In May 1995 he was baptized and since that time he sang in the choir in the church of St. Innocent of Irkutsk, and then the Resurrection Cathedral in Yuzhno-Sakhalinsk.

=== Monastic life and ordination ===
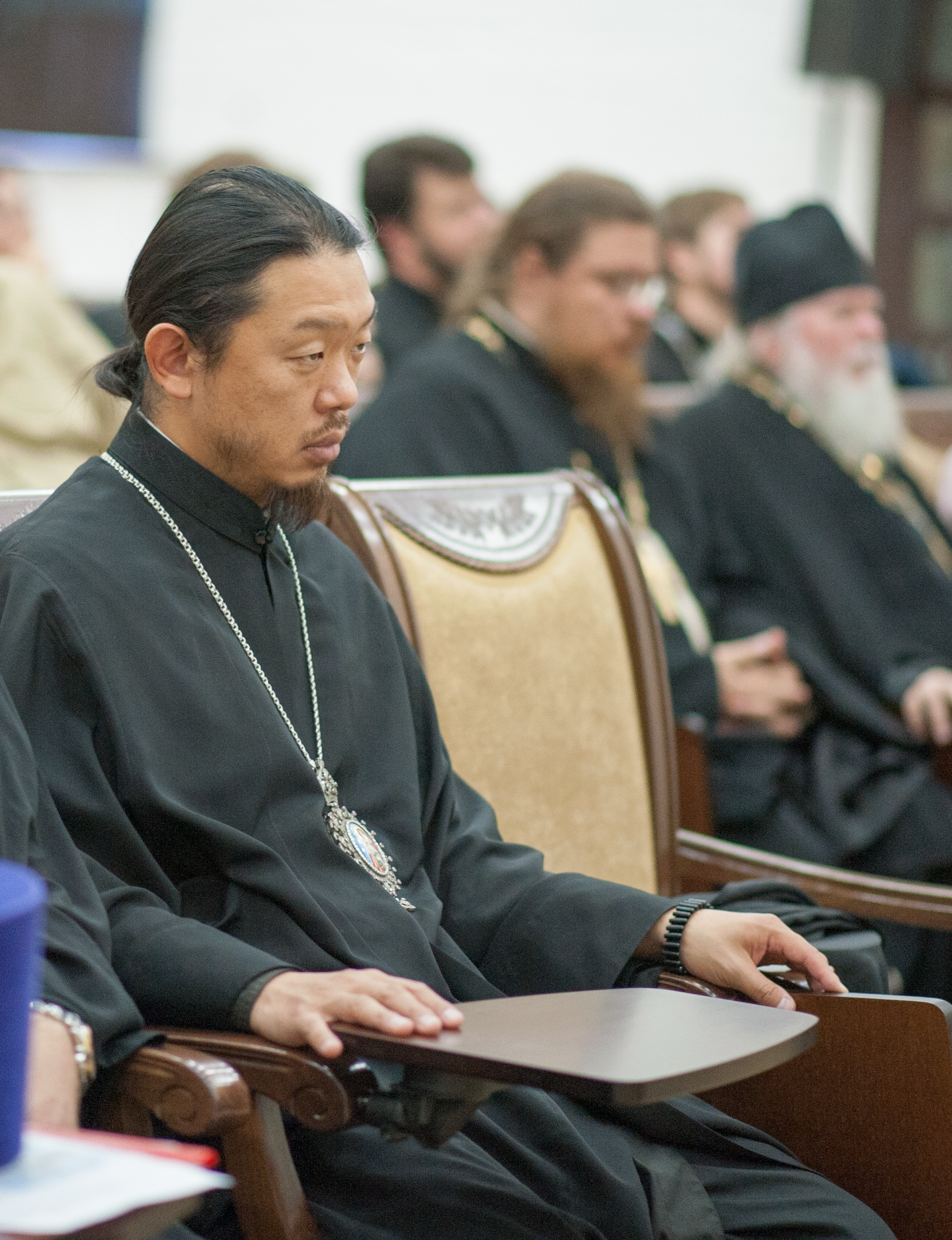
Theophanes at a conference of Eastern Orthodox bishops in Astrakhan in 2015

On August 14, 1997, Alexei was tonsured a monk by Bishop Jonathan (Tsvetkov) of Yuzhno-Sakhalinsk and the Kuril Islands with the name Theophanes in honor of St. Theophanes the Confessor, Bishop of Nicea.

On August 17, 1997, Theophanes, who was a monk, was ordained a hierodeacon by Bishop Jonathan; Bishop Jonathan thereafter ordained him a hieromonk on August 19.

During 1997 and 1998, Fr. Theophanes was a priest at the Cathedral of the Resurrection in Yuzhno-Sakhalinsk, while serving as director of the cathedral choir and editor of the diocesan newspaper.

In 1998, he went to Smolensk to study at the Smolensk Theological Seminary. During this period he was assigned to Assumption Cathedral in Smolensk. In 2000 he graduated from Smolensk Theological Seminary was assigned as a priest to the Diocese of Abakan and Kyzyl.

In September 2000, in response to the request of the Bishop Sotirios (Trambas) of Zelon, he was sent to South Korea to serve as pastor to Russian-speaking Eastern Orthodox people, being temporarily assigned as an employee of the DECR of the Moscow Patriarchate to the clergy of the New Zealand metropolis of the Church of Constantinople, which included Korea. To celebrate the church services in Church Slavonic language, he was given a small underground chapel dedicated of St. Maxim the Greek in Seoul, but sometimes he served in other parts of South Korea. At the time of his arrival to the country he did not speak Korean. To study the language he attended daily language classes at the Yonsei University for two years.

On May 16, 2001, he was awarded a pectoral cross at the request of Metropolitan Kirill.

On May 6, 2006, he was named Honorary Citizen of Seoul. He received a diploma from the hands of the Mayor of Seoul Lee Myung-bak.

On June 6, 2006, he was elevated to the rank of hegumen by Metropolitan Kirill at Holy Trinity Catheral of St. Daniel monastery.

On October 6, 2011, Holy Synod of the Russian Orthodox Church elected him bishop of the newly established Diocese of Kyzyl and Tyva within the borders of the Tyva Republic.

On October 25, 2011, Archbishop Jonathan (Tsvetkov) of Abakan elevated him to the rank of archimandrite.

=== Bishop of Kyzyl and Tuva ===
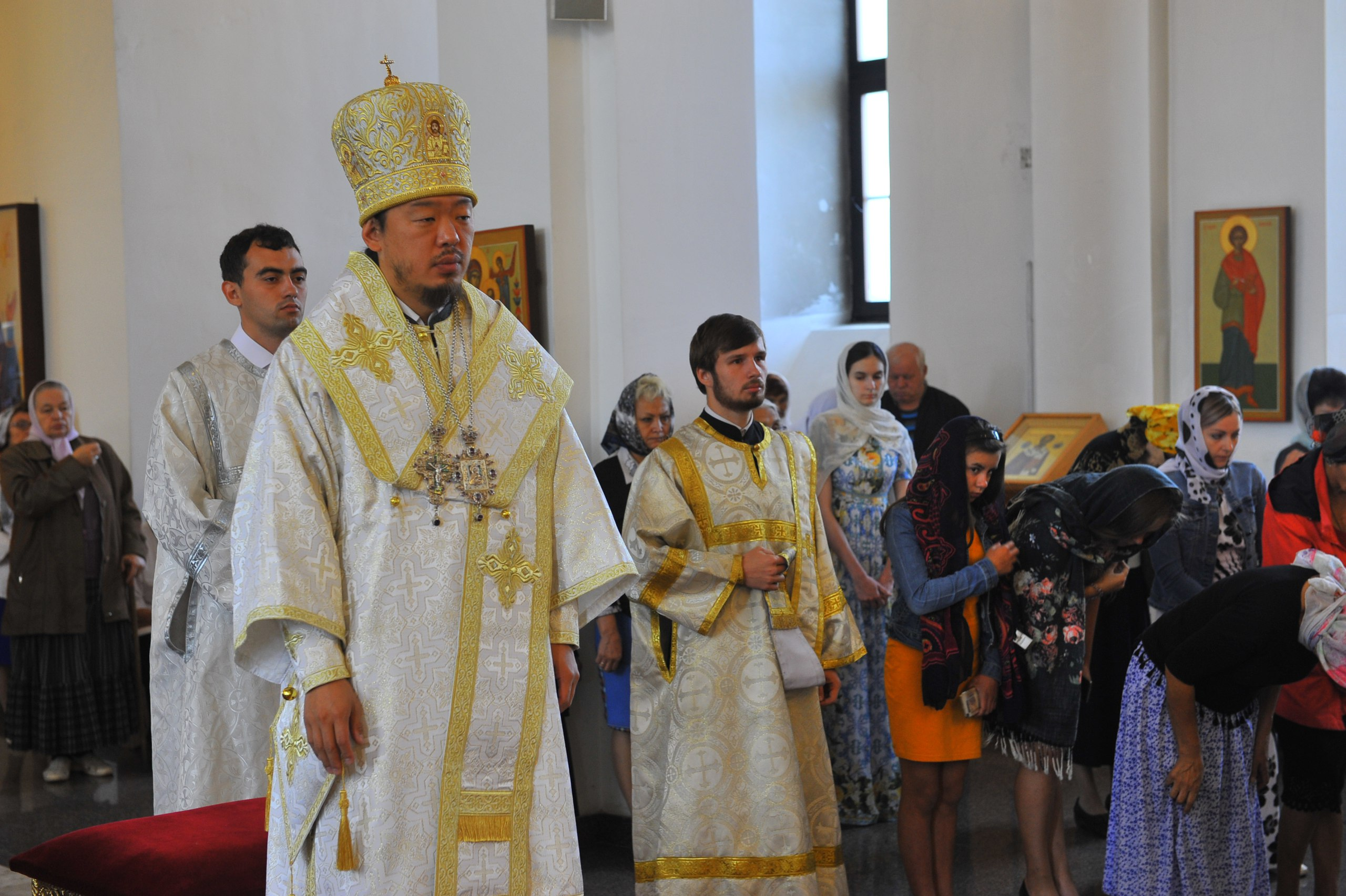
Theophanes leading prayers at the Resurrection Cathedral in Kyzyl

October 30, 2011 at the Assumption Church in Troitse-Lykovo he was consecrated to the rank of Bishop of Kyzyl and Tuva. The consecration was performed by Patriarch Kirill of Moscow and All Russia, Metropolitan Ambrose (Zografos) of Korea (Church of Constantinople), Metropolitan Juvenal (Poyarkov) of Krutitsy and Kolomna, Metropolitan Barsanuphius (Sudakov) of Saransk and Mordovia, Archbishop Arsenius (Yepifanov) of Istra, Archbishop Jonathan (Tsvetkov) of Abakan and Khakassia, Archbishop Mark (Golovkov) of Yegoryevsk, Bishop Sergius (Chashin) of Solnechnogorsk, and Bishop Sabbas (Mikheyev) of Voskresensk.

On November 12, 2011 Bishop Theophanes came to Kyzyl, and on November 13 he celebrated his first divine liturgy after election to the Diocese of Kyzyl. At that time Eastern Orthodoxy was considered in Tuva as a religion for ethnic Russians: if a Tuvan was to become Eastern Orthodox, they would have to forget about the culture of their ancestors and become Russian. For this reason, and also because of the lack of systematic missionary activity, the number of Tuvans who converted to Eastern Orthodoxy was insignificant, while ethnic Russians, who represented 6% of the total population of Tuva, were an ethnic minority and their number was decreasing over time. In these conditions, he began to study and master the Tuvan culture. All the Church bookstores in Tuva began to sell the Bible in Tuvan, translated by the Institute for Bible Translation, and the translation of liturgical texts into Tuvan began. Missionaries from other regions of Russia were actively invited.

On December 4, 2017, in accordance with the new regulations on the awards of the Russian Orthodox Church, Patriarch Kirill of Moscow and all Russia elevated Theophanes to the rank of Archbishop in the Cathedral of Christ the Saviour.

=== Archbishop of Korea ===
On April 4, 2019, by the decision of the Holy Synod of the Russian Orthodox Church, he was appointed Archbishop of the Russian Orthodox diocese of Korea of the Patriarchal Exarchate in South-East Asia, becoming locum tenens of the Diocese of Kyzyl.

Eastern Orthodox Church titles
Preceded by Jonafan (Tsvetkov)	Bishop of Kyzyl and Tuva (Diocese of Kyzyl and Tuva); 2011-2019	Succeeded by Himself (locum tenens)
Preceded by Position established	Archbishop of Korea (Russian Orthodox diocese of Korea in the Patriarchal Exarchate in South-East Asia); 2019–	Succeeded by Incumbent
