= List of honorary citizens of Seoul =

Logo of Seoul

People awarded honorary citizenship of Seoul, South Korea are:

== Honorary citizens of Seoul ==
Listed by date of award:

| Date | Name | Notes |
|---|---|---|
| 1999 | Jackie Chan (7 April 1954–) | Hong Kong movie star |
| 2002 | Guus Hiddink (8 November 1946–) | Dutch football manager |
| 2005 | Christopher R. Hill (10 August 1952–) | United States Ambassador to South Korea (2004–2005) |
| 2006 | Hines Ward (8 March 1976–) | American football player for the Pittsburgh Steelers (1998–2011) |
| 6 May 2006 | hieromonk Theophanes (Kim) (January 19, 1976–) | Member of the clergy of the Russian Orthodox Church |
| 2014 | Michael J. Sandel | Author of JUSTICE and professor at Harvard University |
| 2017 | Sidra (Riaz) (November 4, 1990-) | Pakistani AI-Engineer (Ph.D. in Computer Science) |
| 2018 | Thomas Bach | President of the International Olympic Committee |
| 8 February 2018 | Andrzej Duda | President of Poland |
| 12 December 2018 | Rosy Senanayake (5 January 1958–) | Mayor of Colombo |
| 18 July 2019 | Reuven Rivlin (9 September 1939–) | President of Israel |
| 10 August 2019 | Rev. Dr. Bernice King (28 March 1963–) | Youngest Child of Rev. Dr. Martin Luther King Jr. |
| 30 September 2019 | Mihhail Kõlvart | Mayor of Tallinn, Estonia. |
| 13 November 2019 | Alfred Harth | composer, musician and artist |

As of 2019, there are a total of 823 honorary citizens.
