= Church of the Life-Giving Trinity (Pyongyang) =

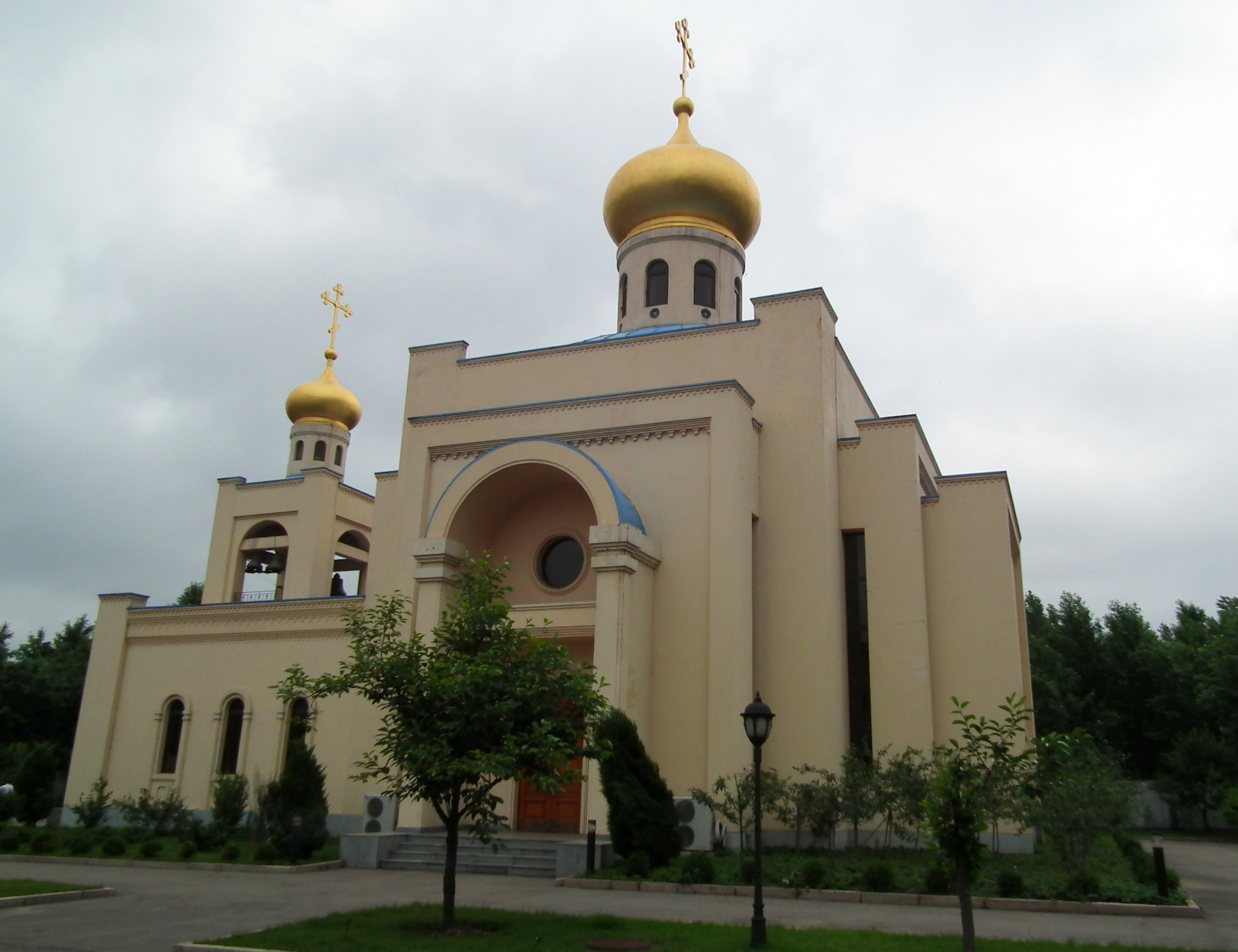
- Exterior of the church

- Location within Pyongyang
- 38.981836°N 125.745733°E
- Location: Jongbaek-dong, Rangrang District, Pyongyang
- Country: North Korea
- Denomination: Russian Orthodox Church

History
- Status: Parish church
- Dedication: Holy Trinity
- Dedicated: 13 August 2006

Architecture
- Functional status: Active
- Groundbreaking: 24 June 2003

Administration
- Division: Patriarchate of Moscow and All Russia
- Parish: Trinity Parish

Clergy
- Rector: Feodor Kim (Kim Hoe-il)

- Church of the Life-Giving Trinity
- Chosŏn'gŭl: 평양정백사원
- Hancha: 平壤貞栢寺院
- Revised Romanization: Pyeongyang Jeongbaek Sawon
- McCune–Reischauer: P'yŏngyang Chŏngbaek Sawŏn

The Church of the Life-Giving Trinity (Korean: 평양정백사원) is a Russian Orthodox church in Jongbaek-dong, Rangrang District in Pyongyang, North Korea. It is the only Orthodox church in the country, serving the small Eastern Orthodox community in North Korea, and one of only a handful of Christian churches there overall.

== History ==
Kim Jong-il reportedly wanted to construct an Eastern Orthodox church in North Korea after a trip to the Russian Far East in 2002. Kim had visited the St. Innocent of Irkutsk Church in Khabarovsk on 22 August and admired its architecture and Russian Orthodox rites. A Russian diplomat asked Kim Jong-il whether there were any Orthodox believers in Pyongyang, and Kim replied that believers would be found.

There were no Eastern Orthodox priests in the country, so the Korean Orthodox Committee, established in North Korea in 2002, contacted the Russian Orthodox Church. The committee sent four students to the Moscow Ecclesiastical Seminary in April 2003. All four were freshly baptized Christians who had formerly worked for the North Korean intelligence service. One of them, Feodor Kim (Kim Hoe-il), said it was difficult for them to adopt the Orthodox faith. After the seminary, they were dispatched to Vladivostok to gain practical experience.

The groundbreaking ceremony was held on 24 June 2003. The church was dedicated on 13 August 2006 in the presence of Russian religious and political leaders.

When the Russian president, Vladimir Putin, made an official visit to Pyongyang in 2024, he visited the church and participated in a brief liturgy.

== Worship ==
The church is presided over by Rector Feodor Kim (Kim Hoe-il) and Deacon John Ra (Ra Gwan-chol), graduates of the theological seminary in Moscow. Very few locals attend the church.

The church has a parish of its own and is under the Patriarchate of Moscow and All Russia. However, the Korean Orthodox Church claims that the Eastern Orthodox Church in North Korea is part of its jurisdiction.

The shrine is consecrated with a relic of Sergius of Rakvere. The church also has a Holy Trinity icon.

== See also ==
- Religion in North Korea
- Korean Orthodox Church
- Eastern Orthodoxy in Korea
