= Dong-won =

- Hangul: 동원
- RR: Dongwon
- MR: Tongwŏn

Dong-won is a Korean given name.

== People ==
People with this name include:

=== Sportspeople ===
- Choi Dong-won (1958–2011), South Korean baseball player
- Han Dong-won (born 1986), South Korean football player
- Ji Dong-won (born 1991), South Korean football player
- Lee Dong-won (footballer) (born 1983), South Korean football player
- Lee Dong-won (figure skater) (born 1996), South Korean figure skater
- Seo Dong-won (footballer born 1973), South Korean football player
- Seo Dong-won (footballer, born 1975), South Korean football player
- Yang Dong-won (born 1987), South Korean football player

=== Other ===
- Gang Dong-won (born 1981), South Korean actor
- Kim Dong-won (filmmaker, born 1955), South Korean documentary filmmaker
- Kim Dong-won (director, born 1962), South Korean director and screenwriter
- Kim Dong-won (percussionist) (born 1965), South Korean traditional percussionist
- Lim Dong-won (born 1934), South Korean politician

== See also ==
- List of Korean given names
