= Sin Kyusik =

Korean independence activist (1880–1922)

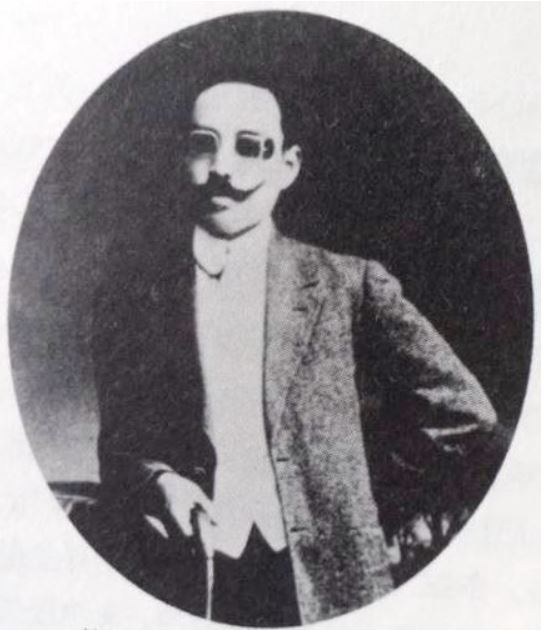
- Born: 22 February 1880
- Died: 25 September 1922 (aged 42)

Korean name
- Hangul: 신규식
- Hanja: 申圭植
- RR: Sin Gyusik
- MR: Sin Kyusik

Sin Kyusik (Korean: 신규식; Hanja: 申圭植; 22 February 1880 – 25 September 1922) was a Korean independence activist who had served as a cabinet member of the Provisional Government of the Republic of Korea during the Japanese occupation of Korea. His name is also spelled also spelt as Shin Kyu-sik, and Sin Kyu-sik.

== Early life ==
Shin was born in Cheongwon County in North Chungcheong Province. In 1899, he went to Seoul and attended the National Chinese Language School (Korean: 한성한어학교; Hanja: 漢城漢語學校).
