= Yi Kwangsu =

Korean writer (1892–1950)

- 이광수; 리광수
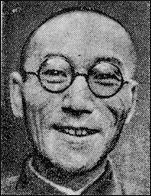
- Born: February 1, 1892; Chŏngju County, Pyongan Province, Joseon
- Died: October 25, 1950 (aged 58); Manpo, Chagang Province, North Korea
- Education: Waseda University
- Occupation: Writer
- Children: 5
- Writing career
- Language: Korean, Japanese

Korean name
- Hangul: 이광수
- Hanja: 李光洙
- RR: I Gwangsu
- MR: I Kwangsu

Art name
- Hangul: 춘원
- Hanja: 春園
- RR: Chunwon
- MR: Ch'unwŏn

Childhood name
- Hangul: 이보경
- Hanja: 李寶鏡
- RR: I Bogyeong
- MR: I Pogyŏng

Yi Kwangsu (Korean: 이광수; Hanja: 李光洙; February 1, 1892 – October 25, 1950) was a Korean writer, Korean independence activist, and later collaborator with Imperial Japan. Yi is best known for his novel Mujŏng (The Heartless), which is often described as the first modern Korean novel.

His art names were Ch'unwŏn and Koju. He adopted a Japanese name, Kayama Mitsurō (香山光郞).

== Biography ==
Yi Kwangsu was born on February 1, 1892 in Chŏngju, North Pyongan Province, Joseon. He was born into a poor yangban (upper class) family. He enrolled at a seodang (traditional school) in 1899.

In 1902, he was orphaned at age 10, when both his parents died of cholera. He was taken in by Pak Ch'anmyŏng (박찬명; 朴贊明), a local leader of the native Korean religion Tonghak. Through the religion, he was able to receive an education. In August 1905, he received a scholarship from the organization Iljinhoe to study abroad in Japan, and enrolled in the Daise Middle School (Japanese: 大城中學) in March 1906. That same year, he returned to Korea due to tuition issues. He went back to Japan in 1907, and transferred into Meiji Gakuin. (Note: Although the school was affiliated with Christianity, Yi did not convert.)

He graduated from Meiji Gakuin in March 1910, and returned to Korea. He then became a teacher at the Osan School (오산학교; 五山學校) in Chŏngju, and its headmaster in 1911. In November 1913, he quit the school in order to travel. He and several others went to Shanghai. They intended to then go to the United States, where he was to be appointed lead writer of the newspaper Sinhan Minbo, but this plan was interrupted by the outbreak of the 1914–1918 First World War. They then returned to Korea. By the 1910s, he was renowned in Korea as a writer. He was considered a vocal reformist and harsh critic of Confucianism.

In September 1915, he went back to Japan and enrolled in Waseda University. By 1917, he entered the university's department of philosophy. He fell seriously ill with a lung disease in 1918. Despite having been married in 1910, he fell in love with another woman who nursed him to health, and the two decided to elope together. They went to Beijing in China in October 1918.

Yi returned to Korea in mid-November 1918. There, he advocated for a national independence movement to leaders of the native Korean religion Cheondoism. He then went to Japan in December. In January 1919, he joined the Korean Young People's Independence Organization (조선청년독립단; 朝鮮靑年獨立團) and served as the lead author of the February 8 Declaration of Independence. The declaration was publicly proclaimed. The declaration served as a catalyst for the nationwide March First Movement protests in Korea. A few days before his declaration was announced, he left Japan by way of Kobe and went to Shanghai, China. Meanwhile in Japan, his compatriots were arrested en masse. He was charged, tried, and sentenced in absentia to nine months in prison. In Shanghai, he settled into the French Concession, and joined the Korean Provisional Government (KPG). He eventually became the editor-in-chief of that organization's official newspaper, Tongnip sinmun.

In March 1921, Yi returned to Korea. He was briefly arrested at the border owing to his previous sentencing in 1919, but was released soon afterwards. Soon afterwards, he met with Governor-General of Chōsen Saitō Makoto. In November, he was arrested again for reasons that are reportedly unknown, but again quickly released. In May 1923, he joined the newspaper The Dong-A Ilbo. Through the paper, he published Korean literature and initially appeared to be a faithful member of the independence movement. However, historian Michael Shin argues that Yi became increasingly viewed with skepticism by Korean nationalists over time. While his writing was beloved, his increasing ties to colonial leadership were treated with skepticism.

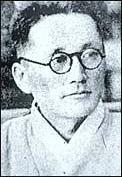
Yi in the 1930s

Yi was imprisoned in 1937 due to the Self-Cultivation Friendship Association (修養同友會/수양동우회) incident, and released half a year later due to illness. During this period he recanted his anti-Japanese stance and leaned more towards collaboration. In 1939, Yi became the first head of the pro-Japanese Korean Writers Association (朝鮮文人協會/조선문인협회) and lead intense efforts to Japanize (hwangminhwa) Korea. He eagerly adopted the name Kayama Mitsurou (香山光郎) as soon as the Sōshi-kaimei policy came into effect.

In 1945, after Korean independence, Yi fled to the countryside. He was arrested for collaboration in 1949. After the war, the Special Committee for the Investigation of Anti-nationalist Activities found Yi guilty of collaboration. In 1950 Yi was captured by the North Korean army and died in Manpo on October 25, most likely of tuberculosis.

== Personal life ==
Yi had two younger sisters, Yi Aegyŏng (이애경) and Yi Aeran (이애란).

In July 1910, Yi married for the first time at age 18, in what was possibly an arranged marriage to Paek Hyesun (백혜순; 白惠順). After his 1915 return to Japan, he fell ill in 1918. He fell in love with the woman who nursed him back to health, Hŏ Yŏngsuk (허영숙). He divorced his first wife that year, and married Hŏ in 1921.

He had three sons, Lee Chinkŭn (이진근), Lee Ponggŭn (이봉근), and Lee Yŏnggŭn (이영근); and two daughters, Chung-Nan Lee Kim (이정란) and Chung-Wha Lee Iyengar (이정화).

== Writing career ==
In late 1909, while at Meiji Gakuin, Yi published his first work of literature: a Japanese-language short story entitled "Is It Love" (Japanese: 愛か？). It was published in the school's student newsletter, Shirogane gakuhō. Around this time, he was reading the works of mostly Russian authors, including Alexander Pushkin, Maxim Gorky, and Leo Tolstoy. Tolstoy would later go on to reportedly become of Yi's largest literary influences; Yi reportedly even developed the nickname of "The Tolstoy of Korea". He also read a number of Japanese authors, including Tōson Shimazaki, Kenjirō Tokutomi, Kinoshita Naoe, and Natsume Sōseki.

In November 1916, Yi published what is considered the first modern work of literary theory in Korea, which was entitled "What Is Literature" (문학이란 하오). It was published in the Maeil sinbo newspaper.

His most famous work is now considered the first modern Korean novel: Mujeong (name sometimes translated as The Heartless). Mujeong reflected the complexities of Korea's modernization efforts.

From the early 1920s to the 1930s, Yi transformed into a dedicated nationalist and published a controversial essay, "On the Remaking of National Consciousness", which advocated a moral overhaul of Korea and blamed Koreans for being defeatist. The third period, from the 1930s on, coincided with Yi's conversion to Buddhism, and his work consequently became noticeably Buddhist in tone. This was also the period in which, as noted above, Yi became a Japanese collaborator.

Yi's professional judgment could be as fickle as his politics. In one famous case he befriended then abandoned the fellow writer Kim Myeong-sun, allegedly because his own beliefs about modernism had shifted. Yi has also been considered one of the pioneers of queer literature in Korea with the publishing of Is it Love (Ai ka) in 1909, when Yi was 17.

== Bibliography ==
- Is It Love (사랑인가 愛か), 1909
- Young Sacrifice (어린 희생)
- Mujeong (Heartless) (무정), 1917
- Reincarnation (재생)
- A Boy's Sorrow (소년의 비애)
- Pioneer (개척자)
- Nameless (무명)
- Soil (흙), 1932
- Crown Prince Maui (마의태자 麻衣太子), 1928
- Danjong Aesa (단종애사 端宗哀史), 1929
- Oil Well (유정 油井)
- Love (사랑), 1938
- Sejo of Joseon (세조대왕)
- Wife of the Revolutionary (혁명가의 아내)
- Aeyog-ui Pian (애욕의 피안)
- Grandmother (할멈)
- Kashil (가실 嘉實)
- My Confession (나의 고백)
- Ambassador Wonhyo (원효대사)
- Death of Yichadon (이차돈의 죽음)
- Biography of Yi Sun-sin (전기 이순신)
- Biography of Ahn Changho (전기 안창호)
- Dosan, Ahn Changho (도산, 안창호)
- Stone Pillow (돌베개)

=== Translated works in English ===
- Mujŏng, translated by Ann Sung-Hi Lee (Cornell University: Cornell East Asia Series, 2005) ISBN 978-1-885-44537-7
- The Soil, translated by Sun-Ae Hwang and Horace Jeffrey Hodges (Dalkey Archive Press, 2013) ISBN 978-1-564-78911-2
- Kashil and Best Essays by Yi Kwang-su, translated by Chung-Nan Lee Kim (Archway Publishing, 2014) ISBN 978-1-480-81363-2
