= Representative Democratic Council =

Korean advisory group

The Representative Democratic Council (Korean: 대한국민대표민주의원) was a group that emerged in Korea after World War II as an advisory group to the military government. It held its first meeting on February 14, 1946. It was led by Syngman Rhee, later to be the first leader of South Korea after the failure of unification. The group was against proposals made between the Americans and the Soviets to set up a Commission which would allow the country to be unified by elections only after a period of self-governance under the international trusteeship.

Rhee opposed the measures because both he and Kim Il Sung wanted to unify Korea which in some ways was an artificial division brought about by Cold War tensions between the United States and the Soviet Union. The fact that Korea had only just emerged from a period of being controlled by Imperial Japan also meant that nationalists such as Rhee were uneasy about another period of foreign involvement in Korea.

It was succeeded by the Interim Legislative Assembly in November 1946.
