= Seo Dong-won (footballer, born 1973) =

South Korean footballer

Seo Dong-won 서동원
Personal information
- Full name: Seo Dong-won
- Date of birth: December 12, 1973 (age 52)
- Place of birth: South Korea
- Height: 1.80 m (5 ft 11 in)

Youth career
- 1992–1996: Korea University

Senior career*
Years	Team	Apps	(Gls)
1997–1999	Ulsan Hyundai	10	(0)
2000	SV Eintracht Trier 05	?	(?)
?	Pohang Steelers	0	(0)

International career
1991–1993	South Korea U-20	5	(0)
1997–1999	South Korea	3	(0)

Managerial career
- 2009–2020: Korea University
- 2021: Guam
- 2025: Daegu
- * Club domestic league appearances and goals

- Seo Dong-won
- Hangul: 서동원
- Hanja: 徐東元
- RR: Seo Dongwon
- MR: Sŏ Tongwŏn

Seo Dong-won (born December 12, 1973) is a South Korean football manager and former player.

He was included in the South Korea U20 for the 1991 FIFA World Youth Championship and 1993 FIFA World Youth Championship.

== Club career ==
- 1997–1999 Ulsan Hyundai
