= Hans Peter Børresen =

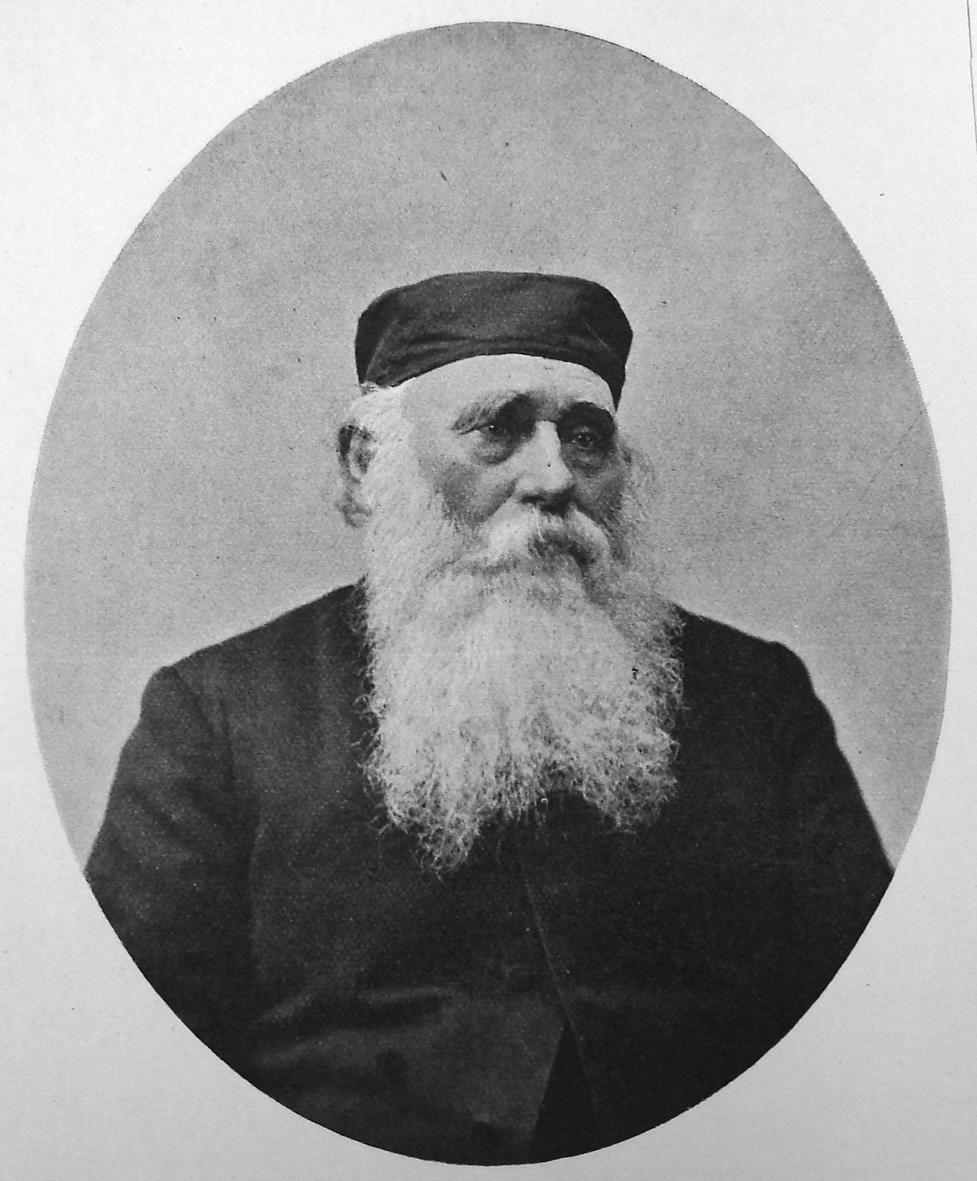
Hans Peter Børresen

Hans Peter Boerresen (29 November 1825 – 23 September 1901) was a Danish missionary to India. He and Norwegian missionary Lars Olsen Skrefsrud were the founders of Northern Evangelical Lutheran Church—centered in North India - Bihar, Assam, and Bengal - extending into Nepal and Bhutan.

== Missionary work ==
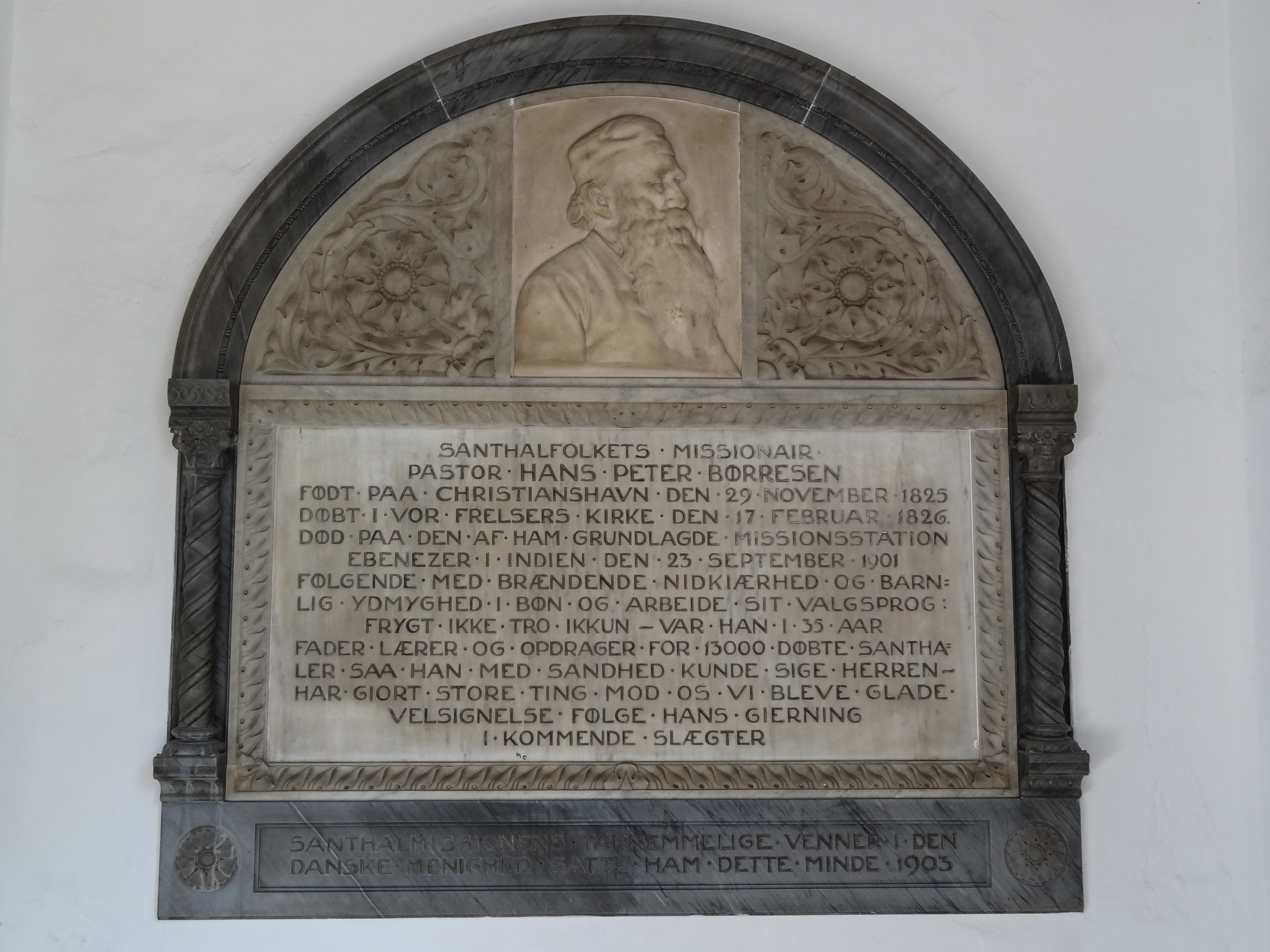
Commemorative plaque in Church of Our Saviour in Copenhagen

Hans Peter Boerresen was sent to India in 1864 by Berlin based Gossner Missionary Society to evangelizing North Indian aborigines. He was initially placed at station Purulia, now in West Bengal to work along with Lars Olsen Skrefsrud.

In 1867, he and Lars Olsen Skrefsrud left the Gossner Mission along with Edward Colpys Johnson, from the Baptist Missionary Society. They founded Ebenezer Mission station at Benagaria in the Santal Parganas. They started the new mission station to work among aborigines (Santals, Bodos, Bengalis, and Bihari people) on their own. Boerresen became fundraiser for the mission, while Skrefsrud gave the mission its dynamic character and resolute sense of purpose. Skrefsrud learned the Santali language and published a Santali grammar in 1873, which was of higher quality than the prior work of Jeremiah Phillips which dated to 1852.

In 1868, he and Skrefsrud settled in Assam where they founded Northern Evangelical Lutheran Church, which centered on North India, with members from among Santals (in majority), Bengali, and Boros. In 1877, Børresen returned to Copenhagen where he continued his work as a priest.

== See also ==
- Norwegian Santal Mission
