= Northern Evangelical Lutheran Church, Suri =

Church in Birbhum district

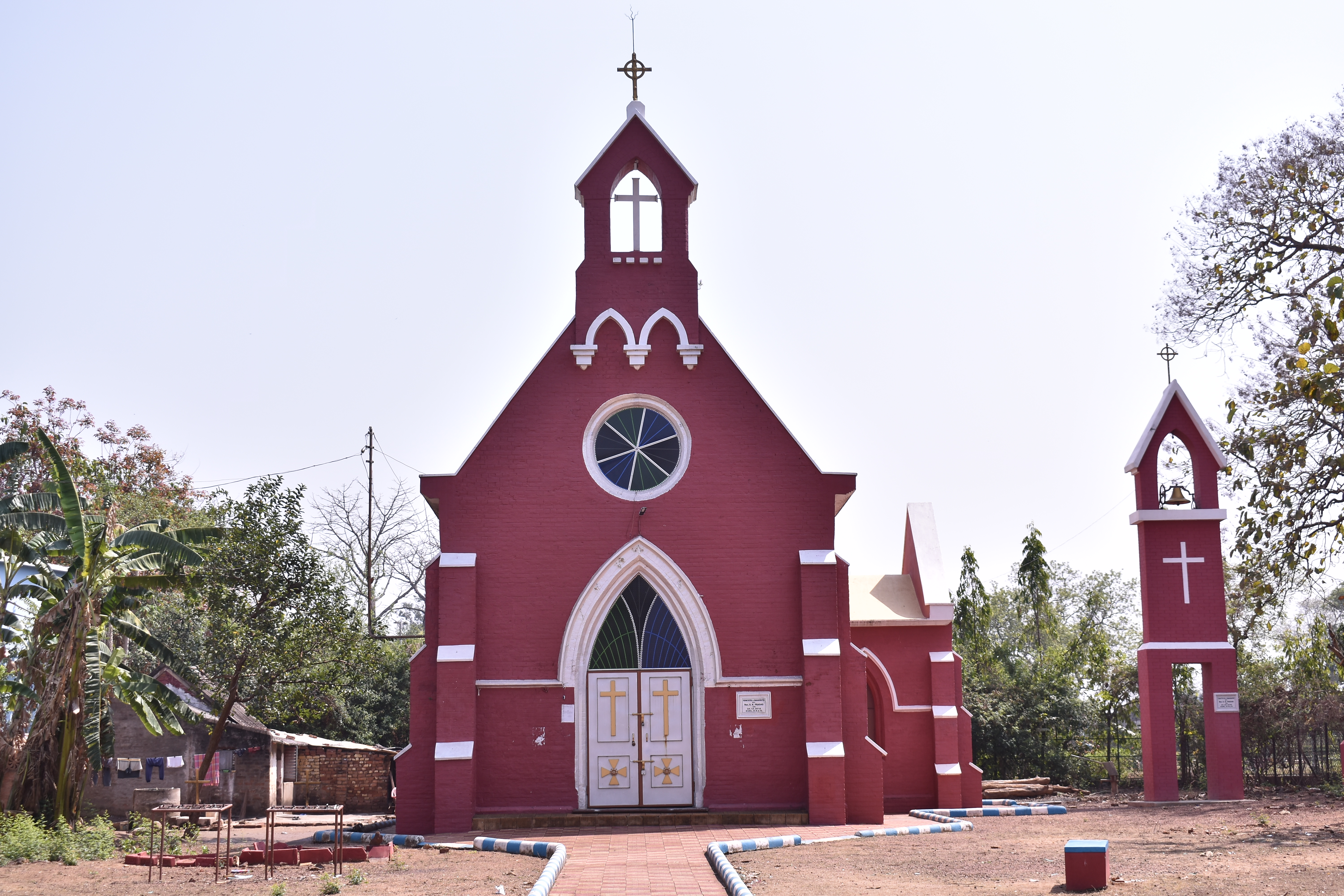
Northern Evangelical Lutheran Church in Suri

Northern Evangelical Lutheran Church, Suri (NELC) is a heritage church in Birbhum district in the Indian state of West Bengal. This is a Northern Evangelical Lutheran Church situated at Lalkuthipara, Suri.

== History ==
It is commonly known as Laal Girja. The Church was established in 1876 by the Baptist missionaries of Suri. The building was made following European architectural style with Italian Tiles. In 2016 the Church Committee renovated the building.
