= Northern Evangelical Lutheran Church =

Lutheran church in India

Northern Evangelical Lutheran Church (NELC) is a multi-lingual Lutheran Christian church that is centred mainly in four states of North India - Jharkhand, Assam, Arunachal Pradesh, and West Bengal. The reach of the Church extends into Nepal and the NELC also works in Bhutan. It is one of the three Lutheran denominations in northeast India along with the Bodo Evangelical Lutheran Church and the Gossner Evangelical Lutheran Church.

The Church was founded in 1868 by Hans Peter Boerresen, a Dane, and Lars Olsen Skrefsrud, a Norwegian. NELC missionary Paul Olaf Bodding invented the Santali latin alphabet that is still used by people in the region today. Santals form the majority of church members, with Boro and Bengali people comprising most of the rest of the members. Currently, it has more than 85,000 baptized members.

The NELC took its present name in 1958 and its headquarters are situated in Dumka, a growing educational center northeast of Kolkata. The church provides theological training and education. The NELC is one of ten members of the United Evangelical Lutheran Churches in India. Mornai Tea Estate in earlier it was Goalpara district now recently formed Kokrajhar district, Assam, is owned by the church. The NELC runs several health centers and community health programs and has its main hospital in Mohulpahari, Jharkhand.

== Founders ==
Lars Olsen Skrefsrud and Hans Peter Børresen, succeeded by Paul Olaf Bodding.

== See also ==
- Northern Evangelical Lutheran Church, Suri
- World Christian Encyclopedia
