= Santali language =

Munda language of South Asia

Santali
- ᱥᱟᱱᱛᱟᱲᱤ
- The word Santali in Ol Chiki script
- Native to: India, Bangladesh, Nepal
- Ethnicity: Santal, Mahali
- Native speakers: 7.6 million (2011 census)
- Language family: Austroasiatic: Munda; North Munda; Kherwarian; Santalic; Santali
- Dialects: Mahali (Mahili); Kamari-Santali; Khole; Lohari-Santali; Manjhi; Paharia
- Writing system: Ol Chiki script (official); Bengali-Assamese script; Odia script; Devanagari; Santali Latin alphabet

Official status
- Official language in: India; Jharkhand (additional); West Bengal (additional)

Language codes
- ISO 639-2: sat
- ISO 639-3: Either: sat – Santali mjx – Mahali
- Glottolog: sant1410 Santali maha1291 Mahali
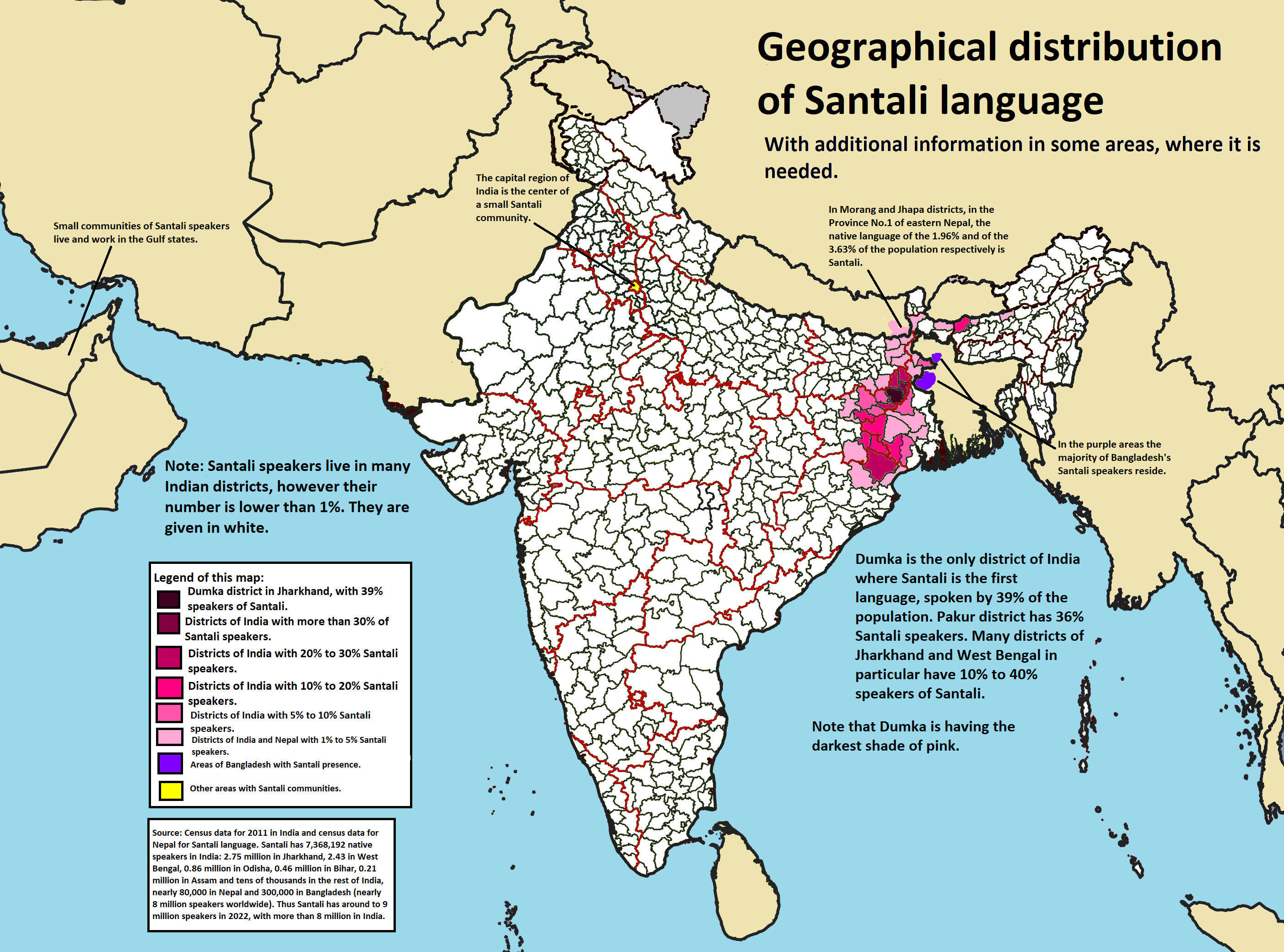
- Distribution of Santali language

Santali (ᱥᱟᱱᱛᱟᱲᱤ, Pronounced: [santaɽi], সাঁওতালি, ସାନ୍ତାଳୀ, सान्ताली) is a Kherwarian Munda language spoken natively by the Santal people of South Asia. It is the most widely-spoken language of the Munda subfamily of the Austroasiatic languages, related to Ho and Mundari, spoken mainly in the Indian states of Assam, Bihar, Jharkhand, Mizoram, Odisha, Tripura and West Bengal. It is one of the constitutionally scheduled official languages of the Indian Republic and the additional official language of Jharkhand and West Bengal per the Eighth Schedule of the Indian Constitution. It is spoken by around 7.6 million people in India, Bangladesh, Bhutan and Nepal, making it the third most-spoken Austroasiatic language after Vietnamese and Khmer.

Santali is characterised by a split into at least a northern and southern dialect sphere, with slightly different sets of phonemes: Southern Santali has six phonemic vowels, in contrast with eight or nine in Northern Santali, different lexical items, and to a certain degree, variable morphology. Santali is recognised by linguists as being phonologically conservative within the Munda branch. Unlike many Munda languages that had their vowel systems restructured and shrunk to five such as Mundari, Ho, and Kharia, Santali retains a larger vowel system of eight phonemic cardinal vowels, which is very unusual in the South Asian linguistic area. The language also uses vowel harmony processes in morphology and expressives similar to Ho and Mundari. Morphosyntactically, Santali, together with Sora, are considered less restructured than other Munda languages, having less influence from Indo-Aryan and Dravidian languages. Clause structure is topic-prominent by default.

Santali is primarily written in Ol Chiki script, an indigenous alphabetic writing system developed in 1925 by Santal writer Raghunath Murmu. Additionally, it is also written in various regional Indian writing systems such as Bengali-Assamese script, Odia script, Devanagari, and the Santali Latin alphabet.

A Santali speaker in Assam, India

== Name ==
The Santals call themselves hɔɽ (lit. 'man') and their language hɔɽ rɔɽ ("language of the Santals"). It is also referred as mãjhi bhasa ("language of the Majhis"), and the Santals, when being asked about their caste, sometimes call themselves maɲjhi or mãjhi ("village headman", "chief"). In North Bengal, the language is known as jaŋli or pahaɽia. In Bihar it is called parsi ("foreign"). The name Santal, in turn, was derived from Sāmanta-pāla ('dwellers of the frontiers') and was used by Bengalis to refer the Santals. L.O. Skrefsrud assumed that Santal was derived from Sãot, name of a place in Midnapore region in West Bengal where the Santals were supposed to have been settled in remote antiquity. In Nepal, the Santali language is known as Satar.

Buru cetan te Northern Santali balaya song

== History ==
According to linguist Paul Sidwell, proto-Munda language speakers ancestral of Santali probably arrived on the coast of Odisha from Indochina about 4000–3500 years ago, and spread before the Indo-Aryan migration to the Chota Nagpur Plateau and adjacent areas.

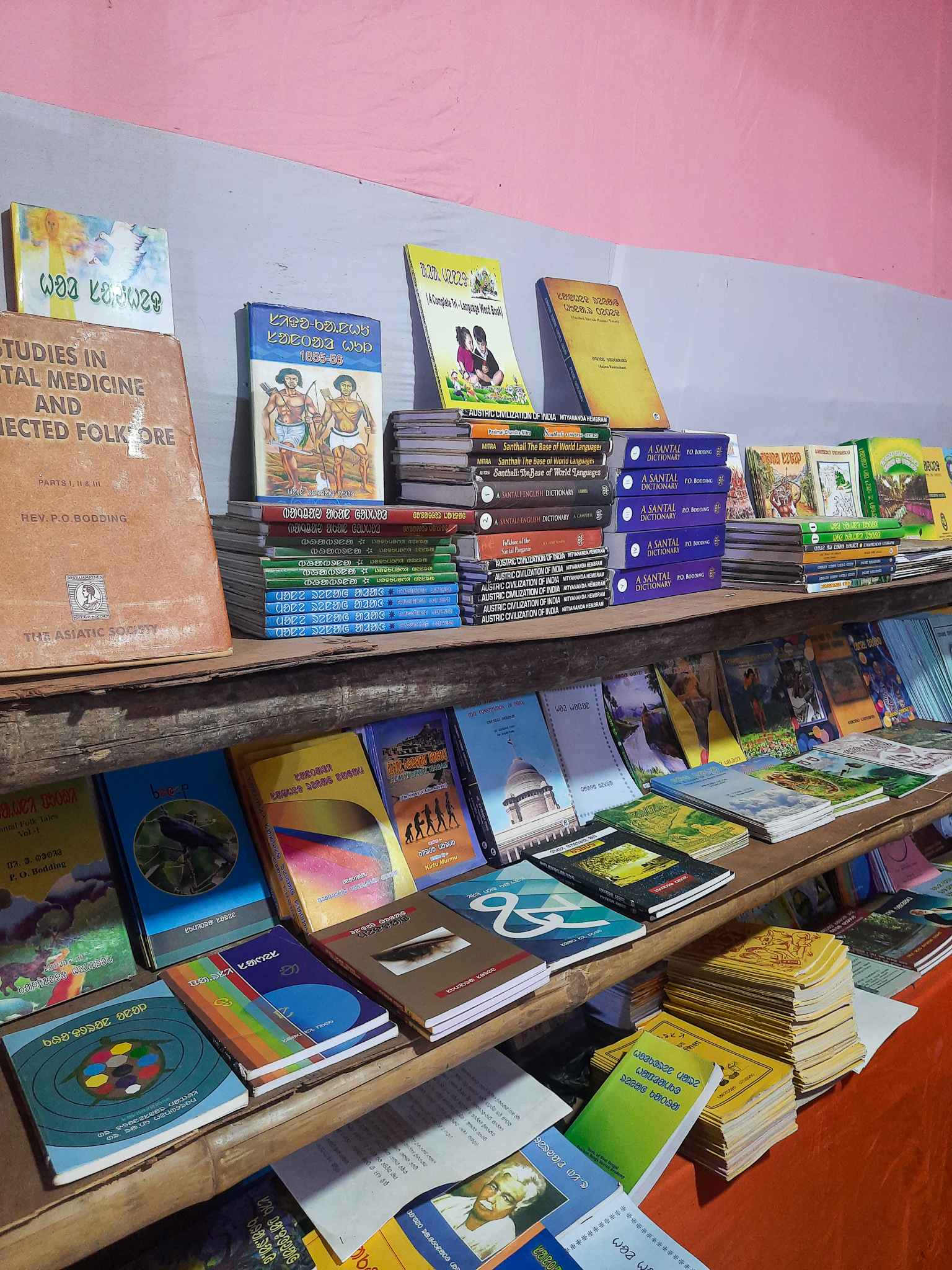
Santali books in Mayurbhanj Book Fair

Santali remained non-literary until the mid-1800s, when European interest in the languages of India led to the first efforts to document it. The language was initially recorded using the Latin alphabet, then Bengali, Devanagari, and Odia by European-American anthropologists, folklorists, and missionaries such as Jeremiah Phillips, A. R. Campbell, Lars Skrefsrud, and Paul Bodding. Their work resulted in Santali dictionaries, collections of folk tales, and studies on the language’s morphology, syntax, and phonetics. By the late 19th-century, several Santal intellectuals began to use several writing systems to compose books, stories, and poems in their language. The first Santali weekly magazine in Latin alphabet, the Pera Ho̠ṛ, was established in 1922, followed by the Marshal Tabon (1946); Bihar-run Devanagari Ho̠ṛ So̠mbad (1947), Bengali Pachim Bangla (1956), and the Jug Siriro̠l (since 1971) in Latin. There are two Bangladesh-based Santali monthly magazines–Aboak’ kurumuTureak’ Kurai and GoDet’–both written in Bengali script and published from Rangpur and Dhaka, respectively.

In 1922, Sadhu Ramchand Murmu from Jhargram district of West Bengal attempted to create a Santali script called Monj Dander Ank, but it did not gain popularity. Later, in 1925, Raghunath Murmu from Mayurbhanj district of Odisha developed the Ol Chiki script, which was first publicised in 1939 and eventually became widely adopted. The Ol Chiki script is now considered as official script for Santali literature and language across West Bengal, Odisha, and Jharkhand. However, users from Bangladesh use Bengali script instead.

Santali was included in the Eighth Schedule to the Constitution of India for official recognition as a scheduled language in 2003 through the 92nd Amendment Act, granting it the right to be used in government communication, education, and competitive examinations. In December 2013, the UGC, the higher education regulatory body of India, introduced Santali as a subject in the National Eligibility Test (NET), enabling its use for lectureship and as a medium of instruction in colleges and universities.

== Geographic distribution ==
Distribution of Santali language in the states of India
1. Jharkhand (44.4%)
2. West Bengal (33.0%)
3. Odisha (11.7%)
4. Bihar (6.20%)
5. Assam (2.90%)
6. Maharashtra (1.40%)
7. Chhattisgarh (0.20%)
8. Tripura (0.10%)
9. Other states (0.10%)

Santali is spoken by over seven million people across India, Bangladesh, Bhutan, and Nepal, with India being its native country and having the largest number of speakers amongst the four. According to 2011 census, India has a total of 7,368,192 Santali speakers (including 358,579 Karmali, 26,399 Mahli). State wise distribution is Jharkhand (2.75 million), West Bengal (2.43 million), Odisha (0.86 million), Bihar (0.46 million), Assam (0.21 million) and a few thousand in each of Chhattisgarh, and in north-eastern states Tripura, Arunachal Pradesh, Mizoram.

The highest concentrations of Santali language speakers are in Santhal Pargana division, as well as East Singhbhum and Seraikela Kharsawan districts of Jharkhand, the Jangalmahals region of West Bengal (Jhargram, Bankura and Purulia districts) and Mayurbhanj district of Odisha.

Smaller pockets of Santali language speakers are found in the northern Chota Nagpur plateau (Hazaribagh, Giridih, Ramgarh, Bokaro and Dhanbad districts), Balesore and Kendujhar districts of Odisha, and throughout western and northern West Bengal (Birbhum, Paschim Medinipur, Hooghly, Paschim Bardhaman, Purba Bardhaman, Malda, Dakshin Dinajpur, Uttar Dinajpur, Jalpaiguri and Darjeeling districts), Banka district and Purnia division of Bihar (Araria, Katihar, Purnia and Kishanganj districts), and tea-garden regions of Assam (Kokrajhar, Sonitpur, Chirang and Udalguri districts). Outside India, the language is spoken in pockets of Rangpur and Rajshahi divisions of northern Bangladesh as well as the Morang and Jhapa districts in the Terai of Koshi Province in Nepal.

=== Official status ===
Santali is one of India's 22 scheduled languages. It is also recognised as the additional official language of the states of Jharkhand and West Bengal.

=== Dialects ===
Dialects of Santali include Kamari-Santali, Khole, Lohari-Santali, Mahali, Manjhi, Paharia.

Being scattered apart in many different pockets in one of the most densely-populated parts of India, Santali dialects are becoming increasingly distinct in phonology, morphology, and lexicon. Reports by R.N. Cust (1878) mentioned four or more dialects, while according to George Campbell, only two main Santali dialects are attested: Northern and Southern. Data gathered by Ghosh (1994) and Kobayashi et al. confirm Campbell's account. Northern Santali speakers are concentrated in Santhal Pargana division (Godda, Deoghar, Dumka, Jamtara, Sahibganj and Pakur), Hazaribagh, throughout the North Chotanagpur Division; Purnia and Bhagalpur divisions in Bihar; Malda division, Birbhum, Bankura, Murshidabad, Cooch Behar, and Jalpaiguri districts in West Bengal. Southern Santali speakers predominantly live in Southern Bankura, Purulia, Paschim Medinipur in West Bengal; Gumla, Simdega, the Singbhum districts of Jharkhand; Balesore and Kendujhar, and Mayurbhanj district of Odisha.

According to observation by Ghosh, "In the lexicon SS (Southern Santali) and NS (Northern Santali) are somewhat different, initiated by borrowing from the neighbouring languages. The local borrowings in the two dialects are so high that sometimes one appears to be unintelligible to the other. In certain cases the usage is also different."

== Phonology ==
=== Consonants ===
Santali has 21 consonants, not counting the 10 aspirated stops which occur primarily, but not exclusively, in Indo-Aryan loanwords and are given in parentheses in the table below.

		Bilabial	Alveolar	Retroflex	Palatal	Velar	Glottal
Nasal		m	n	(ɳ)*	ɲ	ŋ	
Stop	voiceless	p (pʰ)	t (tʰ)	ʈ (ʈʰ)	c (cʰ)	k (kʰ)	ʔ
Stop	voiced	b (bʱ)	d (dʱ)	ɖ (ɖʱ)	ɟ (ɟʱ)	ɡ (ɡʱ)	
Fricative			s				h
Trill/Flap			r	ɽ			
Approximant			l		j	w	

*ɳ only appears as an allophone of /n/ before /ɖ/.

Contraction of a vowel may further contribute to the phonemic presence of aspirated consonants. Eg. dʱiri < dihiri "stone".

In native words, the opposition between voiceless and voiced stops is neutralised in word-final position. A typical Munda feature is that word-final stops are "checked", i. e. glottalised and unreleased. So in Santali, all stops in coda position are underlyingly voiced. Nominally, they are preglottalised and devoiced, but may resurface voicing optionally before vocalic suffixes. Eg. pɛrɛˀt͡ʃ [pɛrɛˀɟ̥̚] ("to fill") → [pɛrɛˀɟ̥̚-a-ɛ] ("he fills"). Sebeok (1943) and Ghosh (2008) treat the checked consonants as allophones of /p t t͡ʃ k/, since they are exclusively found in coda positions.

No Santali lexemes are found begin with onsets /ɽ-/ and /ŋ-/. Anderson (2007) suggests the presence of a series of prenasalised stops that occur mostly in medial and coda positions, based on the following words:

- beɽmbak̚ "incorrectly"
- kʰəɽnduŋ ~ kʰəndɽuŋ "deep"
- kʰoɳɖo "ill conditioned"
- mɔ̃ɲd͡ʒ "beautiful"
- oʈʰŋgao "to steady on"

Bodding (1930) described that there are two types of /j/: a hardened fricative sound [ʝ] produced by forcing airflow through a narrow gap between the front of the tongue and the hard palate, "narrower than when pronouncing the vowel /i/." This sound appears to be a component of the lexical root. Eg. [hoʝo] "to shave". The other /j/ is an intervocalic semivowel that are found in between level diphthongs in actual speech, but not seen in writing. Eg. [miʔʲug] "era".

=== Vowels ===
Santali has eight oral and six nasal vowel phonemes. With the exception of /e o/, all oral vowels have a nasalised counterpart. Nasalisation is phonemic in Santali, eg. aɽɔt "dense" vs aɽɔ̃t "unsympathetic, filthy."

	Front	Central	Back
High	i ĩ		u ũ
Mid-high	e	ə ə̃	o
Mid-low	ɛ ɛ̃		ɔ ɔ̃
Low		a ã	

The Southern Santali dialect (Singhbhum) features a smaller inventory of six vowels /a, i, e, o, u, ə/.

The comparative method would suggest a five vowel system for Proto-Kherwarian. Osada (1996) proposes that the open vowel /ɛ, ɔ/ in Santali likely emerged under Indo-Aryan influence, notably Bengali. However, acoustic and prosodic analyses on Santali dialects and other Munda languages provide phonetic and distributional evidence for the argument that Santali and Munda languages are undergoing or have undergone contraction rather than expansion of their vowel systems. Monosyllables preserve the fullest contrasts (including phonemic /ə/ and localised mid-vowel splits), but disyllables, especially in prominent second syllables, show convergence toward a symmetrical five-vowel /i e a o u/ system and progressive loss of vowel harmony. The mid-central vowel is restricted in distribution, and mid-vowel (ATR-like) contrasts are unstable and geographically uneven. Overall, the trajectory is toward merger and neutralisation. Comparatively, other Munda languages such as Mundari and Ho already exhibit five-vowel systems, suggesting a broader synchronic areal convergence. Although contact with Bengali and Hindi may influence phonetic realization, the dominant structural pattern is reduction from likely more conservative complex vocalic distinctions of proto-Munda, to a pan-South Asian simple five-vowel norm, not expansion of the inventory, with the Assam Santali dialect have achieved the non-harmonic five-vowel system. Vowel harmony also appears to have been vanished entirely in the Odisha dialect. Northern varieties in Jharkhand and West Bengal preserve older oppositions; southern and peripheral lects show advanced levelling toward a symmetrical five-vowel system.

There are numerous diphthongs and triphthongs. Larger vowel sequences can be found, eg. kɔeaeae, meaning 'he will ask for him', with six consecutive vowels.

Note that in the level diphthongs /ea, ia, io, iu, oa, ua/, semivowels /w, j/ are usually inserted in between and dissolve the diphthong into two syllables when realised.

=== Word prominence ===
Santali prosody exhibits iambic patterns with stress is always released in the second syllable in most disyllabic words, excepting loan words from Hindi, Bihari, Bengali and Assamese. In trisyllabic words, a process called V2 deletion actively drops the second vowel, turning the supposedly trisyllable into a disyllable consisting of two heavy syllables. Despite that, stress consistently falls on the second syllable. Eg. /hapaɽam/ ('ancestor') → [hapˈɽám].

=== Vowel harmony ===
Like all Kherwarian languages, vowel harmony in Santali is a morphological triggered process. In morphology and word formation, Santali uses a vowel harmony system based on vowel height. As discussed above, vowel harmony exhibits geographic variation across Santali dialects. For example, Santali in Sonitpur district, Assam has lost vowel harmony completely, while in neighbouring Udalguri district the vowel harmonic processes still remain active, per 2019 observations. There are certain restrictions in a vowel harmonic sequence:

1). /e/ and /o/ never co-occur with /u/ in the same stress unit (word with affixes, enclitics,...).

2). /ɛ/ and /ɔ/ never co-occur with /e/ and /o/. Thus, some suffixes and enclitics may have two variants, such as the instrumental suffix -tɛ, the vowel is raised to [e], → [-te]. Note that this only occurs with weak (harmonic) syllables and suffixes, while others do not. More examples to show: ɛɽɛ=e → [ɛɽɛ=jɛ] (lie=3), ɛgɛr ("to scold"), gɔʈɛn ("part"), mɛrɔm ("goat"), ɛhɔp ("to begin"), hɔʈlɛˀtʃ ("cooking pot"). Trisyllabic, tetrasyllabic structures and anything beyond the domain of the foot seem to not follow this pattern consistently. Eg. bɛhebajoˀt ("neglect"), bɛdɛrgɛˀtʃ ("unclean"), tʃʰɔldori ("small tent").

3). Syllables with /i/ and /u/ only co-occur with /ə/, but not /a/. Eg. busək ("to give birth"), bidə ("to dismiss"), əgu ("to bring").

4). Only /a/ can co-occur with /e o ɛ ɔ/ while /ə/ cannot. Eg. boŋga ("evil spirit"), sadɔm ("horse"), hako ("fish"), mare ("ancient").

5). /e/ may be alternated to /i/ if the preceding syllable ends with /u/ or /ə/.

== Morphology ==
Santali, like all Munda languages, is a suffixing agglutinating language. It remains a subject of intense linguistic debate over whether Santali and related languages such as Mundari and Kherwarian lects have recognizable parts of speech (verbs, nouns, adjectives,...). Traditional grammatical descriptions often treat lexemes that take cases in a syntactical unit as parts of the nominal system, and those that take TAM/Person/Number as verbal. However, deeper analyses by Neukom (2001), Hengeveld & Rijkhoff (2005), Peterson (2005), Rau (2013) suggest that in fact Santali is a flexible language; that is, the lexemes are inherently underspecified for lexical category and can either function in referential ("noun"), predicative ("verb"), or attributive ("modifier") roles; while Evans & Osada (2005) and Croft (2005) argue that the Kherwarian languages do possess, but fluid, defined word classes. According to Neukom (2001), about one-third of all the Santali lexemes ("contentives") are rigid, un-derived verbs, which means they are syntactically restricted to the predicative function. The rest of the lexicon (nominals, proforms, adpositions, derived "nominals" etc) are purely contentive and syntactically flexible. Currently, the Oxford Handbook of Word Classes (2023) rates Santali as a Type I Flexible language.

=== Nouns ===
Nouns are inflected for number and case.

==== Number ====
Three numbers are distinguished: singular, dual and plural.

Singular	ᱥᱮᱛᱟ (seta)	'dog'
Dual	ᱥᱮᱛᱟᱼᱠᱤᱱ (seta-kin)	'two dogs'
Plural	ᱥᱮᱛᱟᱼᱠᱚ (seta-ko)	'dogs'

==== Case ====
The case suffix follows the number suffix. The following cases are distinguished:

Case	Marker	Function
Nominative	-Ø	Subject and object
Genitive	ᱼᱨᱮᱱ (-rɛn) (animate) ᱼᱟᱜ (-aˀk), ᱼᱨᱮᱭᱟᱜ (-rɛaˀk) (inanimate)	Possessor
Comitative	ᱼᱴᱷᱮᱱ (-ʈhɛn) -ᱴᱷᱮᱡ (-ʈhɛˀtʃ)	Goal, place
Instrumental-Locative	ᱼᱛᱮ (-tɛ)	Instrument, cause, motion
Sociative	ᱼᱥᱟᱶ (-são)	Association
Allative	ᱼᱥᱮᱱ (-sɛn) ᱼᱥᱮᱡ (-sɛˀtʃ)	Direction
Ablative	ᱼᱠᱷᱚᱱ (-khɔn) ᱼᱠᱷᱚᱡ (-khɔˀtʃ)	Source, origin
Locative	ᱼᱨᱮ (-rɛ)	Spatio-temporal location

==== Possession ====
Santali has possessive suffixes which are only used with kinship terms: 1st person -ɲ, 2nd person -m, 3rd person -t. The suffixes do not distinguish possessor number.

==== Definiteness ====
To mark nominals as definite, Santali morphology uses suffixes -tɛˀt for nouns, and -ʈaˀk for pronouns, respectively.

ɖər-tɛˀt əgui-mɛ, dare-tɛˀt ikə-kə-kˀ-mɛ
branch-DEF bring-2SG.IMP tree-DEF be-MOD-MID-2SG.IMP
'Bring the branch, let the tree be.'

==== Gender and noun class ====
True gender distinction marking on nominals and verbs (like in Sanskrit, Hindi, other Indo-Aryan and Dravidian languages) does not exist in Santali. Native peripheral markers such as the genitive, locative markers, and nominalizers can be used to distinguish between animate and inanimate noun classes. For lexicalised gender distinction, there are several ways to mark the contrast between female and male:

- Morphologically-marked modifiers borrowed from Indo-Aryan such as -i for feminine, and -a for masculine are found in certain lexemes:

- kuɽa ("boy") – kuɽi ("girl")
- bhola ("dog") – bholi ("bitch")
- mama ("maternal uncle") – məni ("maternal aunt")
- caɖra ("bald man") – cəɖri ("bald woman")
- bheɖa ("ram") – bheɖi ("sheep")

- Sex-based gender lexemes. These words are inherently gendered and cannot be inflected for gender, unlike the words listed above.

- dʒãwaj "husband" – bəhu "wife"
- bɔeha "brother" – misɛra "sister"
- ənɖiə "ox" – gəi "cow"
- kaɖa "male buffalo" – bitkil "female buffalo"

- Compounded sex-based gender. The head noun is compounded with a gender-denoting modifying word. Masculine compounds go with ənɖiə, sanɖi, pɛ̄ʈhar, kuɖu, and feminine objects go with ɛŋga, bətʃhi, and pəʈhi.

- ənɖiə pusi "male cat" – ɛŋga pusi "female cat"
- sənɖi sim "rooster" – ɛŋga sim "hem"
- pɛ̄ʈhar mihu "male calf" – bətʃhi mihu "do" FEM
- kuɖu sukri "boar" – pəʈhi sukri "pig"

=== Pronouns ===
The personal pronouns in Santali distinguish inclusive and exclusive first person and anaphoric and demonstrative third person.

Personal pronouns
		Singular	Dual	Plural
1st person	exclusive	ᱤᱧ (iɲ)	ᱟᱹᱞᱤᱧ (əliɲ)	ᱟᱞᱮ (alɛ)
1st person	inclusive	ᱤᱧ (iɲ)	ᱟᱞᱟᱝ (alaŋ)	ᱟᱵᱳ (abo)
2nd person		ᱟᱢ (am)	ᱟᱵᱮᱱ (aben)	ᱟᱯᱮ (apɛ)
3rd person	Anaphoric	ᱟᱡ (aˀtʃ)	ᱟᱹᱠᱤᱱ (əkin)	ᱟᱠᱳ (ako)
3rd person	Demonstrative	ᱩᱱᱤ (uni)	ᱩᱱᱠᱤᱱ (unkin)	ᱳᱱᱠᱳ (onko)

The interrogative pronouns have different forms for animate ('who?') and inanimate ('what?'), and referential ('which?') vs. non-referential.

Interrogative pronouns
	Animate	Inanimate
Referential	ᱚᱠᱚᱭ (ɔkɔe)	ᱳᱠᱟ (oka)
Non-referential	ᱪᱮᱹᱞᱮᱹ (tʃele)	ᱪᱮᱫ (tʃeˀt)

The indefinite pronouns are:

Indefinite pronouns
	Animate	Inanimate
'any'	ᱡᱟᱸᱦᱟᱸᱭᱟᱜ (jãheã)	ᱡᱟᱸᱦᱟᱸ (jãhã)
'some'	ᱟᱫᱚᱢ (adɔm)	ᱟᱫᱚᱢᱟᱜ (adɔmak)
'another'	ᱮᱴᱟᱜᱤᱡ (ɛʈaˀkiˀtʃ)	ᱮᱴᱟᱜᱟᱜ (ɛʈaˀkaˀk)

The demonstratives distinguish three degrees of deixis (proximate, distal, remote) and simple ('this', 'that', etc.) and particular ('just this', 'just that') forms.

Demonstratives
		Simple		Particular	
		Animate	Inanimate	Animate	Inanimate
Proximate	Singular	ᱱᱩᱭ (nui)	ᱱᱚᱣᱟ (nui)	ᱱᱤ (nii)	ᱱᱤᱭᱟᱹ (niə)
Proximate	Dual	ᱱᱩᱠᱤᱱ (nukin)	ᱱᱚᱣᱟᱠᱤᱱ (noakin)	ᱱᱤᱠᱤᱱ (nikin)	ᱱᱤᱭᱟᱹᱠᱤᱱ (niəkin)
Proximate	Plural	ᱱᱳᱠᱳ / ᱱᱩᱠᱩ (noko / nuku)	ᱱᱚᱣᱟᱠᱳ (noako)	ᱱᱮᱹᱠᱳ / ᱱᱩᱠᱩ (neko / niku)	ᱱᱤᱭᱟᱹᱠᱳ (niəko)
Distal	Singular	ᱩᱱᱤ (uni)	ᱳᱱᱟ (ona)	ᱤᱱᱤ (ini)	ᱤᱱᱟᱹ (inə)
Distal	Dual	ᱳᱱᱠᱤᱱ (onkin)	ᱳᱱᱟᱠᱤᱱ (onakin)	ᱤᱱᱠᱤᱱ (inkin)	ᱤᱱᱟᱹᱠᱤᱱ (inəkin)
Distal	Plural	ᱳᱱᱠᱳ / ᱩᱱᱠᱩ (onko / unku)	ᱳᱱᱟᱠᱳ (onako)	ᱮᱹᱱᱠᱳ / ᱤᱱᱠᱩ (enko / inku)	ᱤᱱᱟᱹᱠᱳ (inəko)
Remote	Singular	ᱦᱟᱹᱱᱤ (həni)	ᱦᱟᱱᱟ (hana)		
Remote	Dual	ᱦᱟᱹᱱᱠᱤᱱ (hənkin)	ᱦᱟᱱᱟᱠᱤᱱ (hanakin)		
Remote	Plural	ᱦᱟᱹᱱᱠᱳ (hanko)	ᱦᱟᱱᱟᱠᱳ (hanako)		

=== Numerals ===
The basic cardinal numbers (transcribed into Latin script IPA) are:

1	ᱢᱤᱫ	miˀt
2	ᱵᱟᱨ	bar
3	ᱯᱮ	pɛ
4	ᱯᱩᱱ	pon
5	ᱢᱚᱬᱮ	mɔ̃ɽɛ̃
6	ᱛᱩᱨᱩᱭ	turui
7	ᱮᱭᱟᱭ	ɛyae
8	ᱤᱨᱟᱹᱞ	irəl
9	ᱟᱨᱮ	arɛ
10	ᱜᱮᱞ	gɛl
20	ᱤᱥᱤ	-isi
100	ᱥᱟᱭ	-sae

The numerals are used with numeral classifiers. Distributive numerals are formed by reduplicating the first consonant and vowel, e.g. babar 'two each'.

Numbers basically follow a base-10 pattern. Numbers from 11 to 19 are formed by addition, gɛl ('10') followed by the single-digit number (1 through 9). Multiples of ten are formed by multiplication: the single-digit number (2 through 9) is followed by gɛl ('10'). Some numbers are part of a base-20 number system. 20 can be bar gɛl or isi.

ᱯᱮ {} ᱜᱮᱞ {
} or {
} (ᱢᱤᱫ) {} ᱤᱥᱤ {} ᱜᱮᱞ
pe {} gel {} or {} (miˀt) {} isi {} gel
(3‍ × 10‍) {} or {} ((1‍) × 20‍ + 10‍)
30

=== Adpositions ===
Santali has a quite large number of postpositional words that can be added to either the bare nominals or to the number suffixes and the definitive marker. Some of them require the genitive case. There are complex forms that use combinations of a postposition and a case suffix.

Santali adpositions
	Meaning
ləgiˀt/lagaˀt + -tɛ	'for'
modre	'among'
dhəbiˀtʃ	'till, until, up to'
bhitrirɛ	'inside, within'
talarɛ	'middle'
latarrɛ	'under'
lagire	'due to'
tʃetanrɛ	'above, top'
leka/leka-tɛ	'like/by any means'
atɛ	'along with'
hɔtɛˀtʃtɛ	'for, by, due to'
tuluˀtʃ	'being with, association with'
iəte	'owing to, due to, on account of'
-katɛ	gerund, converb
mɛntɛ	'by saying, for the purpose'

=== Derivation ===
To derive new nominals, the stems of lexical verbs, adjectives, and other nouns can employ many different methods, including affixation, reduplication, and compounding.

Suffixation: Two nominalising suffixes -iˀtʃ for animate, and -aˀk for inanimate noun class, are used to form referential nominals.

Verbs → nouns: dʒɔm ('eat') > dʒɔmaˀk ('food')

adjectives → nouns: nɔtɛ ('this side') > nɔtɛn ('belonging to this side') > nɔtɛnaˀk ('thing of this side') / nɔtɛniˀtʃ ('one of this side')

ponɖ ('white') > ponɖaˀk ('white thing') / ponɖiˀtʃ ('white one')

suffixes → nouns: ɔl-tɛ (write-INS) > ɔltɛaˀk ('that with which is written(pen)')

An entire verbal construction can be nominalised:

dal-ke-d-ej-iˀtʃ
fight-AOR.ACT-TR-3SG.OBJ-ANIM.NMLZ
'one who struck him/her'

Infixation is the most productive derivation method in Santali. Infixes -tV-, -nV-, -mV-, -ɽV-, and -pV- are often inserted into nouns, verbs, adjectives to derive new words.

ɛhɔˀp ('begin') > ɛtɔhɔˀp ('beginning')

rakaˀp ('rise', 'ascend') > ranakaˀp ('development')

Prefixation in North Munda has been reduced to a very few restricted exceptions.

tʃɛt ('teach') > matʃɛt ('teacher')

Despite bearing noun-like semantics, the derived forms remain precategorial and can appear in other functions in probably seldom-attested contexts.

oɽaˀk=iɲ ɛtɔhɔˀp-akaˀt-a
house=1SG.SUBJ beginning-ACT.PRF-IND
'I have begun (to build) the house.'

=== Verbs ===
Verbs in Santali inflect for tense, aspect and mood, voice and the person and number of the subject and sometimes of the object. However, defining parts of speech in traditional linguistic terms, such as "verbs" and "nouns" in Jharkhandi Munda languages more generally (including most Kherwarian varieties and Kharia) is a highly controversial issue, since the evidence for discrete lexical categories like nouns, verbs, and adjectives is often extremely weak or even virtually absent, at least in the basic lexical level. From this perspective, it may be nearly unfeasible to apply the conventional parts-of-speech framework to North Munda. A single element with apparently nominal semantics (may be metonymic in nature) may function as the predicate base in one sentence (typically in clause-final position), while appearing elsewhere as an argument in the identical form, with no phonological and morphological change. In fact, predicates and their complements may be primarily defined by syntactic configurations rather than by inherent lexical categories. For further theoretical and empirical discussions on word classes in Mundari, see Evans & Osada (2005), Peterson (2005), Hengeveld & Rijkhoff (2005), Croft (2005); for Kharia, see Peterson (2013).

Similarly, Santali has been described as a language with a regular degree of lexical flexibility. Neukom (2001) posits that "nouns" don't exist in Santali, but instead there are "flexible lexemes" that can function either as arguments (=referential role) or as predicates within phrasal units, with no profound categorical distinction between these uses. In everyday speech, Santali flexibility may show even more idiosyncrasies than those documented for Mundari. Rau (2013) provides attested examples showing that, within accepted usage, even proper names—cross-linguistically often treated as purely referential expressions denoting inherent properties may frequently occur as predicates in Santali without eliciting objections. For instance, the sentence unkin-dɔ Kaɽa ar Guja-wa-kin-a 'Their names were Kara and Guja' (lit. "they were Kara-and-Guja-ed") uses the second proper name directly as an active applicative predicate, while the first name precedes the conjunctive element, producing a distributive interpretation of the predication.

Neukom (2001) further notes that almost any type of lexeme—including nominals, interrogatives, and indefinites—can function predicatively, but when is combined with either a light verb copula (kan "COP.IPFV" or tahɛ̃kan "COP.IMPREF") or an applicative suffix -a/-wa (often glossed as "for/to someone") plus the indicative/finite suffix. Together, these elements act as a compositional verbalising operator, yielding a structure that exhibits characteristics of a nominal sentence. For discussion on the flexibility of Southern Santali, see Dash (2025).

==== Santali TAMs ====
The Santali TAM system is very complicated. In fact, categories of tense-aspects and voices always fuse into an interlocked system consisting of a series of verbal subtemplates, so it is impossible for analyses to single out a morpheme that marks a single TAM category accordingly. TAM paradigms interact with active and middle voice intricately: Active TAMs denote senses of UNMARKED, transitive, volitional, and outwardly directed, mostly employed in polyvalent predicates; Middle TAMs signify the status of intransitive, self-directed, and avolitional, mostly found in monovalent predicates. There are two subtemplates for the imperfective and perfective. Two recognisable tense categories are non-past and past, and the past is further divided into two tenses: anterior and aorist. The imperative/prohibitive do not have any markers but possess their own unique verbal templates.

Santali verb paradigm	Active	Middle
Future/Present	-Ø	-oˀk
Present Progressive	-eˀt (-kan)	-oˀk-kan
Aorist	-keˀt	-en
Anterior	-leˀt	-len
Perfect	-akaˀt	-akan
Past perfect	-akaˀt-tahɛ̃kan	-akan-tahɛ̃kan
Past progressive	-eˀt-tahɛ̃kan	-oˀk-kan-tahɛ̃kan
Optative	-ke	-k-oˀk
Irrealis	-le	-len
Conditional	-khan	

==== Applicative TAMs ====
Applicative voice in Santali is represented by adding the applicative marker -a- to four tenses (Future, Imperfective, Past 1, Perfect) with an additional and rare Past 2 tense in the cases of inanimate objects. The active set serve polyvalent predicates, while the middle set mark for monovalent ones.

Santali applicative TAMs	Active	Middle
Future	-a	-jɔn
Present	-a-kan	-jɔn-kan
Past Animate	-aˀt	-an
Perfect	-akawaˀt	-akawan
Past Inanimate	(-laˀk)	–

==== Subject markers ====
		singular	dual	plural
1st person	exclusive	-ɲ(iɲ)	-liɲ	-lɛ
1st person	inclusive	-ɲ(iɲ)	-laŋ	-bon
2nd person		-m	-ben	-pɛ
3rd person		-e	-kin	-ko

==== Object markers ====
Transitive verbs with pronominal objects take infixed object markers.

		singular	dual	plural
1st person	exclusive	-iɲ-	-liɲ-	-lɛ-
1st person	inclusive	-iɲ-	-laŋ-	-bon-
2nd person		-me-	-ben-	-pɛ-
3rd person		-e-	-kin-	-ko-

In applicative constructions, inanimate objects are marked with a pronominal suffix, a checked -ˀk.

==== Possessor argument indexing ====
Transitive verbs may form agreements with non-arguments/outside/indirect objects. To denote inalienable possession of the concerned indirect object, prefix -t- is attached to the applicative forms of the pronouns; otherwise it is marked in the noun phrase and functions as an attribute.

ako-ge=ko idi-ke-ˀt-ko-tako-a
3PL-EMPH=3PL.SUBJ take-ACT.AOR-TR-3PL.OBJ-3PL.POSS-FIN
'They took theirs away themselves.'

==== Dual person as honorific ====
In specific contexts nowadays, Santali speakers have been increasingly using the pronominal duals to express honorific in a generalised sense to show respect to the addressed interactants, such as senior, highly-regarded, or unfamiliar persons.

==== To be and to have ====
Two lexemes mena ("to be") and hena ("to have") have irregular templates. The subject pronominal marker, instead of being an enclitic form, appears as a suffix in the slot where the object marker normally would be placed. All constructions involving these two verbs are conjugated in the middle voice to express existence, possession, and location.

tʃɛtˀ dʒinis hena-ˀk-taben-a
what thing have-MID.PRES-2DU.POSS-FIN
'What thing is there of you (have)?'

noko-modre kombɽo mena-e-a
these-among thieve be-3SG.SUBJ-IND
'There is a thief among these persons.'

bar ganɖa sim hopon mena-ˀk-ko-tale-a
Two CLF chicken children be-MID.PRES-3PL.SUBJ-1PL.POSS-FIN
'We have eight chicks.'

Santali mena seems to be stemmed out from a small number of originally middle, intransitive predicate bases that have an inversed pronominalised pattern. Some other inherently intransitive, low agency, and non-volitional predicates such as rɛnɛˀtʃ ("be hungry") may display similar irregular behaviours like that of mena.

rɛnɛˀtʃ-iɲ=a
be.hungry-1SG.OBJ=IND
'I'm hungry.'

Below is the paradigm of non-negated, non-past, fully finite existential/locative copula mena:

Non-negated, non-past, fully finite copular structure
		singular	dual	plural
1st person	exclusive	mena-ɲ=a	mena-ʔ-liɲ=a	mena-ʔ-le=a
1st person	inclusive	mena-ɲ=a	mena-ʔ-laŋ=a	mena-ʔ-bon=a
2nd person		mena-m-a	mena-ʔ-ben=a	mena-ʔ-pe=a
3rd person	Animate	mena-e=a	mena-ʔ-kin=a	mena-ʔ-ko=wa
3rd person	Inanimate	mena-ʔ=a		

==== Semantics and pragmatics in Santali verb indexation ====
In Santali as well as Kherwarian languages, the pronominal subject markers are mobile clitics that may encompass the whole clause. In most of the cases, except the stems mena and hena mentioned above, the pronominal subject clitics have two placements: (1) attach to the word preceding the verb stem, or, (2), enclitic to the final position of the verbal complex:

(1) X=S Verb

daka=ko dʒɔm-∅-a
rice=3PL.SUBJ eat-ACT.PRES-IND
'they eat rice'

(2) X verb=S

daka dʒɔm-∅-a=ko
rice eat-ACT.PRES-IND=3PL.SUBJ
'they eat rice'

According to MacPhail (1957), (1) occurs more frequently than (2).

In complicated predicates, where there are more than one lexeme constitutes the sentence, such as the glossed one below, the subject clitic follow the (2) indexation pattern, not the (1) as expected:

ale dɔ lelha bhucuŋ koŋka bhũiə kan-a-le
we(PL.EXCL) TOP stupid ignorant foolish Bhuya IPFV.COP-IND=1PL.EXCL
'We are foolish, stupid, witless Bhuyas.'

The placement of the subject clitic can also distinguish the type of nominal sentences (sentences with copulae). In a predicational sentence where the subject is referential and the complement is non-referential, the host of the clitic is the subject.

miˀt=dɔ=e bhut kan-a
one=TOP=3SG.SUBJ ghost COP-IND
'One was a ghost.'

In an equative sentence where both the subject and the complement are referential, the subject clitic is placed at the end of the sentence.

nui ma iɲ-ren hɔɽ kan=e
this MOD 1SG-GEN.ANIM person COP=3SG.SUBJ
'This is my wife.'

Indexing arguments in Santali is essentially intertwined with the distinction of animacy of arguments. Distinction between animate/inanimate is not marked on nouns at all, but is conveyed through morphosyntax, such as in genitive and locative cases and verbal agreement. That is, if an argument of the verb does not belong to the animate noun class, the verb will not index that argument. Inanimate entities such as flower, tree, rice, book, food,... and objects that cannot move by themselves like vehicles (eg. motorbike, car, aeroplane) are never indexed by the verb. However, there are some notable exceptions of inanimate objects that are significant ('sun', 'moon', 'star') or culturally important ('doll') are considered animate in Santali:

siɲtʃãdo rakaˀp-kan-a=e
sun rise.MID.AUGM-IPFV-FIN=3SG.SUBJ
'The sun is rising'

ɲiɲdətʃãdo dubuˀtʃ-en-a=e
moon set.MID.AUGM-MID.ANT-FIN=3SG.SUBJ
'The moon set'

Likewise, 'Government' is also considered a single body of animate entities and is marked with third person singular. Even mushroom, thorn being pricked, puff-ball, earwax are perceived as animate and are indexed by pronominal markers as such, showing the unpredictability of the Santali animacy-based indexation system.

In negative formations, the negation particle may show indexation of an inanimate subject, while other Kherwarian languages suppress it.

ɖɛr ba=i rapud-kan-a
tree.branch NEG=3SG.SUBJ.INAN break-IPFV-IND/FIN
'The branch isn't breaking.'

==== Imperative ====
As described by Ghosh (2008), there are no specific markers for the imperative series. However, in the affirmative imperative, the indicative/finite marker -a is replaced by second person markers. In the negative imperative, verb (TAM/person-syntagma) takes -a while the imperative subject marker moves to the enclitic position behind the negative particle, right before the verb (See ##Negation).

daja-kate ma-ge oko-baɲtʃao-ka-ɲ-tabon-pe
show.mercy-CONV MOD-FOC hide-save-BEN-1SG.OBJ-1PL.INCL.POSS-2PL.SUBJ.IMP
'Please show kindness and hide and save me (for the sake of us)'

==== Finiteness ====
Any finite predicates will attach a suffix -a, except the imperative and in the subordinate clause. Marxed predicates are indicative (real, default, narrative), while unmarked predicates can be interpreted as partially finite and non-finite, in which they can take the infinitive, converb, or a case marker.

noa-rɛaˀk miˀt ʈaŋ kəhəni ləi-ad-iɲ-a=e
this-GEN one CLF story tell-ACT.APPL.PST-1SG.OBJ-FIN=3SG.SUBJ
'S/he told me a story about this.'

==== Causative ====
There are two causative markers: a- and -otʃo. -otʃo is attached on every type of verb stems, and a- is restricted to two transitive verbs jɔm ('eat') and ɲu ('drink').

am iɲ ba=m ɖaɽ-otʃo-li-d-iɲ-a
You me NEG=2SG.SUBJ run-CAUS-ACT.ANT-TR-1SG.OBJ-IND
'You didn’t make me run.'
Anderson (2018), field notes.

==== Permissive ====
While both the causative and the permissive share the same suffix -otʃo, the permissive is different as an applicative marker is combined with the causative morpheme, resulting in the shift of the concerned person from the accusative to the dative position.

sɛn-otʃo-daɽe-a-e-a=ɲ
go-CAUS-ABIL-ACT.APPL.IPFV-3SG.OBJ-FIN=1SG.SUBJ
'I let/made him/her come.'

ɲɛl-otʃo-ad-e-tahɛ̃kan-a=ko
see-PERM-ACT.APPL.PST-3SG.OBJ-IMPERF-FIN=3PL.SUBJ
'They had permitted him/her to see.'

==== Reciprocal ====
Infix -pV- turns transitive and ditransitive verb roots into reciprocal meaning, but in many verbs it also conveys that the action is done together by two participants.

dal ('beat') > dapal ('beat each other')

landa ('laugh') > lapanda ('laugh together')

==== Benefactive ====
The benefactive for transitive and ditransitive stems is -ka in Northern Santali dialect and -ka-k in Southern Santali. In Southern Santali, if the object is animate, the last -k will be replaced by pronominal clitics. All benefactive stems are conjugated with active TAM markers.

tɔl ('bind') > tɔlka ('to bind for somebody')

tɔl-ka-e-kan-a=e
bind-BEN-3SG.OBJ-IPFV-FIN=3SG.SUBJ
'S/he is binding it(cow) for someone.'

==== Medio-passive ====
Transitive verbs and a limited number of intransitive and intransitive-transitive verb roots will take -jɔn to form the Medio-passive voice.

==== Passive and Reflexive ====
Transitive roots, transitive-intransitive roots, and causative stems will take -ok to derive passive stems. In the transitive-intransitive roots, it denotes the prominence of transitivity. Attaching it to transitive verbs will create reflexivity.

ɲɛl ('see') > ɲɛlok ('be seen') (passive)

ranotʃo ('cause to medicate') > ranotʃok ('be caused to medicate') (causative > passive)

mak ('cut') > makok ('cut oneself') (reflexive)

The intransitive applicative TAM set is also interpreted as expressing reflexivity and used to emphasise the action directed toward the subject themselves.

uni tupri ar aŋgrɔp=e hɔrɔk-akawan-a
He hat and coat=3SG.SUBJ put.on-MID.APPL.PRF-IND
'S/he has put on hat and coat.'

==== Noun incorporation ====
Noun incorporation is not a feature of Santali.

==== Nominal "verbalisation" ====
In daily speeches, nominal roots can be found functioning as verbs with appropriate inflection. The verbalisation of nominals extends to interrogatives and indefinites. Adjectives that are derived from nominals can take inflection as well as person indexation, too. It is said that virtually every entity-denoting lexeme is capable of functioning the predicative role in Santali.

(1) "medicine"

ɔdʒɔn-ad-e-a=ɲ
medicine-ACT.APPL.PST-3SG.OBJ-IND=1SG.SUBJ
'I gave him/her medicine.' (lit. 'I medicine-ed him/her')

(2) "king"

jon raajaa-en-a=e
John king-MID.PST-IND=3SG
'John became king.' (Lit. 'John kingged.')

(3) "orphan"

huɖiɲ gidrə=i ʈuər-oʈo-ka-d-e-a
small child=3SG.SUBJ orphan-leave-AOR.ACT-TR-3SG.OBJ-IND
'She left a child motherless.'

(4) Pronoun

uni dɔ am-aˀk-kan-a=e
S/he TOP 2SG-GEN-IPFV-IND=3SG.SUBJ
'S/he is yours.' (lit. 'S/he is you-r-ing')

In the (1) example, the "verbalized" predicate structure of the lexeme ɔdʒɔn bears the identical semantics as of the free lexeme itself, with an additional applicative (to give DATIVE) sense. The (2) sentence with middle TAM suffix also shows compositional semantics, producing an inchoative meaning to become X (X here is entity/state/property-denoting semantics). The (3) sentence exemplifies an active TAM suffixed predicate using a "noun-like" lexeme ʈuər ("orphan") as the semantic base, which brings up a subtle shift to causative theme to make X/make someone be X, but the semantics is still mostly uniform (orphan–motherless).

Similar "verbalization/recategorization" via zero derivation like these can occur in English (eg. gun–gunned "get shot by gunfire", ice–iced "become ice", empty–emptied "become empty, make something empty",...). However, English has both idiosyncratic verbalisation (unpredictable semantic outcome) and compositional verbalisation (predictable semantic outcome), while in Santali it displays extreme regularity and predictability as they have direct semantic correspondence with their nominal counterparts and very little idiosyncrasies.

(5) "big"

dare maraŋ-en-a
tree big-MID.PST-IND
'The tree became big.' (Lit. 'The tree bigged.')

(6) "kind"

uni dɔ dajawan-kan-a=e
S/he TOP kind-IPFV-IND=3SG.SUBJ
'S/he is kind.'

(7) superlative comparison

hana dare noa dare-ko-khɔn dɔ sɛ̃ɽa-gɛ-a
that.far.INAN tree this.INAN tree-PL-ABL TOP big-FOC-IND
'That tree is bigger than this tree.'

The existence of an independent adjective class in Santali is invalidated by sentences (5), (6), (7), since these adjective-like lexemes can occur in predicate position, take TAM/Person/Number and semantically/syntactically behave like the aforementioned examples (1), (2), (3).

Further more, mimetic sounds, such as ãã (animal groan) (8), complex units, such as the postpositional phrase kombɽo tuluj "with thieves" (9), and even proper names (10) can function as the semantic heads of the predicates. These examples below provide a compelling argument against analysing the flexibility as a lexical derivational process by Evans & Osada (2005). This perspective on "verbalization" support the implication that rather than a linguistic anomaly, flexibility is in fact the nature of the language itself. (Note: Note that flexibility is mostly a North Munda/Jharkhandi phenomenon. In comparison, South Munda languages such as Remo, Sora, Gorum exhibit much less flexibility compared to North Munda and Kharia. For instances, modifiers (i.e. "adjectives") cannot take TAM/Person and have (some languages optionally) to be accompanied with copula verbs in predicational sentences: 1). Remo ɖio seroʔ (ɖi-ta) house dirty COP-MID.NPST 'The house is dirty' 2). Sora anin kuddɨb kəndud-ən-dʒi sɨrɛŋ anin suɽa he all frog-NSFX-PL from he big 'He is bigger than all the other frogs.')

(8) mimetic sound

bar pɛ dhao=e ãã-jen-a
two three time=3SG.SUBJ groan(onomatopoetic)-MID.AOR-IND
'It (i.e. the buffalo) groaned two or three times.'

(9) phrase

alo=m kombɽo tuludʒ-oˀk-a
PROH=2SG.SUBJ thief with-MID-IND
'Don't keep company with thieves.' (lit. 'Don't with thief.')

(10) proper name

uni buɖhi-ren hɔpɔn-tɛˀt koɽa-waˀk ɲutum=dɔ Turtə-wa-e-a
that old.woman-GEN.AN son-3.POSS boy-NMLZ.INAN name=TOP Turta-APPL-3SG.OBJ-IND
'The old woman's son's name was Turta.' (lit. 'That woman's son's name was Turta-ed')

In the cases of proper names, when an active applicative suffix is applied, it expresses that x is caused to be the individual named N, which translates into being called N. In nonpast active form, the construction describes the (temporal) property of being the individual named N to the subject.

==== Serial verb constructions ====
Two or more verbs and modifiers can combine together to derive a compound verb. Normally they are combinations of two transitive verbs or two intransitive verbs and limited numbers of transitive+intransitive and intransitive+transitive combinations.

ɲɛlɲam-led-e-tahɛ̃kan-a=ko
see.find-ACT.ANT-3SG.OBJ-IMPERF-FIN=3PL.SUBJ
'They had seen and found him/her.'

==== Auxiliary verb constructions ====
Complex predicates are pervasive in Munda clause structure. Simple verbs like go, become, finish, come, try,... are often employed as auxiliary verbs (v2 in South Asian linguistics) to add or embolden modality, aktionsart, and orientations to the predicates. In Santali, there are univerbated auxiliary constructions to mark many functions. One example show below, the verb gɔt ("pluck") is often used as auxiliary verb to denote telicity, that is, a quick, sudden, or intense action. Santali AVCs exhibit split-doubled pattern: the lexical verb may index the object argument, and the auxiliary verb may index the subject argument.

ɲɛl-gɔt-ke-d-e-a=pɛ
see-TEL.AUX:pluck-ACT.AOR-TR-3SG.OBJ-FIN=2PL.SUBJ
'You guys suddenly caught sight of him/her' or 'You guys saw him/her off/said good-bye to him/her.'

Some auxiliary constructions may exhibit behaviours of compound verbs. Two most common used auxiliary verbs in Santali are daɽe ("can") and lega ("try"). The first one is often combined with an active applicative suffix, while the latter mostly found with the middle TAMs.

ba=e rɔɽ-daɽe-aˀt-a
NEG=3SG.SUBJ speak-AUX:can-ACT.APPL.PST-FIN
'S/he could not speak'

sereɲ-lega-ˀk-mɛ dʒut-oˀk-rɛ hɔ̃ baŋ-rɛ hɔ̃
sing-AUX:try-MID-2SG.IMP succeed-MID.FUT-LOC too NEG-LOC also
'Try to sing whether you will succeed or not.'

==== Negation ====
There are three particles in Santali used to express negation: baŋ, ɔhɔ and alo. baŋ and ba (shortened form) are the negatives for interrogative and declarative sentences; ɔhɔ is the emphatic negative of declarative sentences; alo is the prohibitive negative in the imperative. These negative particles will take away the subject marker from the verb.

ba=ko sap-le-d-e-a
NEG=3PL.SUBJ catch-ACT.ANT-TR-3SG.OBJ-FIN
'They did not catch him/her.'

alo=m ləi-Ø-a-e-a
PROH=2SG.SUBJ tell-ACT.PRES-BEN-3SG.OBJ-FIN
'Don’t tell him/her.'

In existential/locative copular formations, negation is different in present tense and past tense. Below is the chart of negative, non-past, fully finite existential/locative copula paradigm:

Negated, non-past, fully finite copular structure
		singular	dual	plural
1st person	exclusive	bən-ug-iɲ=a	ban-uʔ-liɲ=a	ban-uʔ-le=a
1st person	inclusive	bən-ug-iɲ=a	ban-uʔ-laŋ=a	ban-uʔ-bon=a
2nd person		ban-uʔ-m=a	ban-uʔ-ben=a	ban-uʔ-pe=a
3rd person	Animate	ban-ug-iˀtʃ=a	ban-uʔ-kin=a	ban-uʔ-ko=wa
3rd person	Inanimate	ban-uʔ=wa		

In negative past copular constructions, the negative particle ban encodes the subject, and the past tense is indicated by the separate copula taheken.

iɲ-rin bar-ija kuɽi gidrə ba=kin taheken=a
I-GEN.ANIM two-CLF girl child NEG=3DU.SUBJ COP.PST=IND
"I did not have two daughters."

=== Expressives ===
Expressives arguably can be justified as an independent lexical category in Santali. Echo-word formation can be constructed by three processes: (1) generating masdar in an identical form; (2) augmenting a consonant in the repeated element; (3) vowel mutation. Sometimes masdars co-occur with vowel mutation simultaneously. Expressives can express highly detailed semantics depicting complex sound symbolisms, emotions, attitudes, sensory imageries, et cetera, and are not constrained by syntactic rules.

(1) masdars. These expressives are formed by simply reduplicating the first element.

- ahal ahal "distressed"
- atrɔm atrɔm "incompletely"
- baɖgɔˀt baɖgɔˀt "rough"
- datʃaŋ datʃaŋ "ubiquitous"
- halaˀt halaˀt "slightly"
- kãˀtʃ kãˀtʃ "whine as a dog"
- adʒaˀk adʒaˀk "clamour for"
- baɖgaˀk baɖgaˀk "sharp painful sensation"
- tʃəɖuˀk tʃəɖuˀk "noise of pumping into water"
- gab gab "sink deeply"
- dʒeleˀp dʒeleˀp "flashing"
- məkur məkur "sound of crunching"

(2) (∅VX CVX) masdars with augmenting a consonant

- əbuˀk tʃəbuˀk "here and there"
- abɛ tabɛ "just at the time of"
- adha padha "unfinished"
- əɖəi bəɖəi "arrogant"
- albaʈ salbaʈ "contradictory"

(3) (∅V1X CV2X) with vowel mutation

- adha padhə "half"
- agaɽ bigəɽ "topsy turvy"
- əhir kuhir "fix the eyes upon"
- ə̃iʈhə̃ dʒithə̃ "leavings of food"
- əril kuril "stare as smoke nips the eyes"

(4) CV1X CV2X with vowel mutation

- batʃaˀk botʃoˀk "nonsensical"
- badha bidhi "occult adverse influence"
- bhaɽ bhuɽ "crashing noise"
- baɖaˀk buɖuˀk "move the lips as if speaking"
- tʃaʈa tʃuʈu "crackle"

(5) V1CV1C V2CV2C with vowel mutation

- adaˀtʃ uduˀtʃ "unwieldly through corpulence"
- agar ogor "dumby"
- araˀk oroˀk "stare vacantly"
- asam usum "leisurely"

(6) V1CV1 V1CV2 (V1 is invariably a and V2 is i)

- ãʈa aʈi "dispute"
- adra ədri "be ill-humoured"
- ahka əhki "painting"
- andka əndki "a strong smell"
- ankha ənkhi "disgusting"
- aɽsa əɽsi "plead an excuse"

The initial and medial consonants of the first element may be alternated in masdars.

- kadar kapar "rubbish"
- hadraˀk gasraˀk "stumbingly"

The Santals categorise expressives as a form of "twisted speech" (benta katha), a discourse mode characterised by profound metaphorical depth. These items occupy a central role in Santali daily communication and cultural life. Expressives are especially high prevalent within performance traditions—including music, storytelling, folktales, and poetry—with an extensive presence in the oral genres of performances.

== Syntax ==
=== Simple clause structure ===
Santali is strictly head-last. Simple noun phrases in Santali would have the following typical structure:

(DEMONSTRATIVE) (QUANTIFIER) (ADJECTIVE) (ADJECTIVE) NOUN

Example: noa əɖi maraŋ bir (that very big forest) "very big forest"

Santali person indexation clearly shows that it follows the nominative-accusative alignment: the subject pronominal clitic agrees with the person/number of the nominative argument; the object pronominal infix agrees with the person/number of the accusative argument. But there are no markings featured on NPs whatsoever to show their relation:

am iɲ=m ɖaɽ-otʃo-ki-d-iɲ-a
You me=2SG.SUBJ run-CAUS-ACT.AOR-TR-1SG.OBJ-IND
'You made me run.'

Thus, word order may be used to determine which constituent part of the non-verbal elements is the subject argument or accusative/object argument. Usually, the unmarked word order is SOV. However, Santali word order is highly influenced by context, discourse, and pragmatism. If the S/A is considered less topical than the O/P, then the word order would be reduced to OV. The sentence would be shrunk down further if no argument is deemed topical. Some can argue that then the pronominal clitics representing arguments in NPs, perhaps, should be considered the arguments themselves.

gidrə-(ko)i rueˀk ɲam-akaˀt-koi-wa
child-PL fever get-ACT.PRF-3PL-IND
Subject Object Verb
'The children caught fever.'

kimin dɔ ba=m əgu-∅-ko-wa
daughter.in.law TOP NEG=2SG.SUBJ bring-ACT.FUT-3SG.OBJ-IND
Object Particle Negative Verb
'Will you not bring daughter-in-law?'

∅ ∅ dʒɔm-le-a=e
∅ ∅ eat-ACT.IRR-IND=3SG.SUBJ
∅ ∅ Verb
'S/he would eat.'

This pattern of accusative case marking and predicate indexation is also the general alignment of most languages around the Santali and Munda-speaking region of Eastern India, including neighbouring Eastern Indo-Aryan (Maithili, Bengali, Sadri,...) and North Dravidian languages, in contrast to the predominantly ergative or split ergative patterns found in Western India and the Himalayas. Historical cross-linguistically, Hindi and Western Indo-Aryan regrammaticalised former instrumental markers as ergative case markers. Neukom (2001) notes that the instrumental marker in Santali is also occasionally used to mark the agent argument (A), but not S or P, in such instances to the "emphasis of subject", which suggests that the use is conditioned by some pragmatic factors.

abo=tɛ raj=do baŋ=bon batʃhao-ko-a
We.INCL=INS king=TOP NEG=1PL.INCL.SUBJ choose-3PL.OBJ-IND
'We shall not choose a king by ourselves.'

This marking pattern resembles the emphasis-motivated uses of ergative markings found in some local Indo-Aryan varieties and Tibeto-Burman languages (Eg. Mongsen Ao).

The default word order of INTRANSITIVE, MONOVALENT sentence is SV, though notice that it can be reduced if the subject is not a matter of topic or focus.

hɔpɔn=e heˀtʃ-en-tiɲ-a
son=3SG.SUBJ come.AUGM.PASS.MID-MID.AOR-1SG.POSS-IND
'My son has come.'

hij-oʔ-en=a=y
come-MID.PASS.AUGM-MID.AOR=IND=3SG.SUBJ
'He has come.'

=== Complex sentence structure ===
Coordinative particles are employed in Santali complex sentence structure for various conjunctive, disjunctive, and adversative functions.

Complex sentence coordinators
	Particle	Translation	Note
Conjunctive	ar	and	operates within the sentence
Conjunctive	adɔ	thereupon	operate across sentences
Conjunctive	khan	then	operate across sentences
Disjunctive	sɛ	or	
Disjunctive	baŋkhan	otherwise	
Adversative	mɛnkhan	but	also denotes switch reference
Adversative	bɔrɔŋ	rather	
Adversative	bitʃkom	rather (L)	
Adversative	hutkə	then	used in conditional sentences to introduce the apodosis, in which the protasis is supposed not to have been realised, and therefore, the apodosis would not have occurred.
Conclusive	baŋma	"that is to say, namely"	

Note that mɛnkhan ("but") may denote switch reference in the second clause.

unkin dɔ din-ge əɖi kurumuʈu=kin kəmi-ja mɛnkhan tʃheka-katɛ=je miˀt din uni hɔɽ-rɛn oraˀk boŋga dɔ bɔhɔˀk laˀtʃ haso ɲam-ke-d-e-a
They.DU TOP day-FOC very diligently=3DU.SUBJ work-IND but how-CONV=3SG.SUBJ one day s/he man-GEN house goddess TOP head stomach pain get-ACT.AOR-TR-3SG.OBJ-IND
'They two work very hard, but one day for unknown reason the man's wife was affected by pain in stomach and head.' (They → the man's wife)

In subordinating clauses, there are the uses of converb katɛ, ablative khɔn, place marker ʈhɛn, temporal khan, and purposive jɛmon available to link the subordinates with the narrative clauses.

ɲɛl-jɔn-katɛ=ɲ tʃalao(ʔ)-ˀkok-a
see-MPASS-CONV=1SG go.AUGM.PASS-MID.OPT-IND
'Seeing it I would go.'

Indefinite pronouns jãhã ("any") and jãhãe ("anyone") are used to link relative clauses. The choice of which particle should be used primarily depends on the semantics and animacy of the referred argument.

jãhã dare-rɛ=m deˀtʃ-len-a on-rɛ miˀt ʈaŋ tɛrɔm tʃak mena-ˀk-a
any tree-LOC=2SG.SUBJ climb.AUGM.PASS.MID-MID.ANT-IND that-LOC one CLF honey comb be-MID.PRES-IND
'There is a honey-comb in the tree which you climbed.'

Pronouns, interrogative pronouns, and correlative particles jodi ("if"), tahle ("then"), tobe ("then"), dʒɛmɔn ("as"), tɛmɔn ("so") are used to form correlatives in both the main and attributive clauses.

oka disɔm-rɛ onko gaɖel hɔɽ-ko jarwa-akan-tahɛ̃kan-a ona disɔm-rɛn raj dɔ gɔj-akan-a
which country-LOC they crowd people=3PL.SUBJ gather-MID.PRF-IMPERF-IND that country-GEN king TOP die-MID.PRF-IND
'The king of the country where the crowd of people had gathered has died.'

dʒɛmɔn=iɲ mɛn-led-a tɛmɔn-ge tʃando in-aˀk sana-e purəu-ke-ˀt-tiɲ-a
as=1SG.SUBJ say-ACT.ANT-IND so-FOC Chando me-GEN wish=3SG.SUBJ fulfill-ACT.AOR-TR-1SG.POSS-IND
'Chando fulfilled my wish as I had asked.' (~ As I had said, so Chando fulfilled my wish)

Combining uses of indefinite pronouns with demonstratives/locatives like jãhã:ona, jãhãe:uni/onko, and jãhã:on-rɛ likewise can also be considered correlative conjunctions.

== Vocabulary ==
In daily conversations, Santali speakers generally employ high percentages of words of native Austroasiatic/Munda/Santali origins, compared to other Munda languages such as Kharia and Juang. The loan strata, mostly borrowed from Hindi (eg. rəskə "joy" < Hindi rasika, haʈ "market" < Hindi hāʈ, kagodʒ/kagotʃ "paper" < Persian kāgaz via Indo-Aryan,...) and regional languages Sadri (Eg. kuʈəm/kutɨsi "hammer" < Sadri kuʈasi), Khortha, Angika, Maithili, Assamese, Bengali (Eg. rəs "heap" < Bangla raʃi, bhəgnə "nephew" < Bangla bhagina/bhagna), Nepali, Oriya and even English may account for almost 20% of the lexemes of daily needs. Younger generation who have opportunities to engage in higher education tend to be more accustomed with lexical influence from neighbouring languages as well as English. A good number of words seem to be derived from earlier stages of Indo-Aryan (either Vedic Sanskrit dating from 1,500-1,000 BCE, Classical Sanskrit ~500 BCE, or Middle Indo-Aryan) are also found, such as datlom "sickle" < Vedic/Classical Sanskrit d̪at̪ra-m "sickle-SG.N.NOM/ACC" (cf. Pali d̪at̪t̪a "sickle", Bengali দা d̪a "blade"). Santali also is the source of borrowings by several regional Indo-Aryan languages, namely Sadri, Khortha and Kurmali. Eg. Khortha gidʌr "child" < Santali gidrə, Kurmali nisʈai "exactly, truly" < Santali niʈsahi, et cetera.

A limited number of words are shared between Kuṛux and Santali, eg. Kuṛux kʰotā "nest" and Santali tukə "nest", Kux. ura "beatle" and Sat. uru "beatle", Kux. busū "straw" and Sat. busuˀp "straw", but they are difficult to analyse as their cognates also appear across other Munda and Indo-Aryan languages. A very few lexical items appear to be shared between Munda and Tibeto-Burman, likely represent the remaining traces of earlier contact between the two groups. Eg. Tshobdun snəm "oil" and Santali sunum "oil", Limbu pɛːr "to fly" and Sat. apir "to fly", Lepcha pok "to throw" and Sat. tapaʔ "to throw", et cetera.

As for the Austroasiatic lexicon, most Santali terms share same origins with other Austroasiatic languages, including aspirated-phoneme words. For examples:

- Santali kʰɛt "rice" and Khasi khaw "rice", < pAA *rŋkoːˀ "husked rice";
- Sat. tʃʰal "tree bark" and Wa hak "skin" < pAA *saːkˀ "skin";
- Sat. bir "forest" and U qí "forest" < pAA *briːˀ "wilderness, forest";
- Sat. dʒʱik "porcupine" and Khasi dŋkʰiet "porcupine" < pAA *ɟkəːɕ, *ɟkɨːɕ "porcupine".

== Sample texts ==
=== Text 1: Article 1 of the Universal Declaration of Human Rights ===
The following text is Article 1 of the Universal Declaration of Human Rights, written in Santali:

==== Ol Chiki Script ====
ᱡᱚᱛᱚ ᱞᱮᱠᱟᱱ ᱢᱳᱱ ᱟᱨ ᱚᱫᱷᱤᱠᱟᱨ ᱨᱮᱭᱟᱜ ᱟᱫᱷᱟᱨ ᱨᱮ ᱢᱩᱪᱟᱹᱫ ᱫᱷᱟᱹᱵᱤᱡ ᱥᱣᱚᱛᱚᱱᱛᱨᱚ ᱟᱨ ᱥᱩᱢᱟᱱ ᱠᱳ ᱦᱩᱭᱩᱜᱼᱟ᱾ ᱩᱱᱠᱳ ᱦᱳ ᱵᱩᱫᱽᱫᱷᱤ ᱟᱨ ᱵᱩᱡᱷᱟᱹᱣ ᱠᱳ ᱟᱹᱜᱩ ᱛᱚᱨᱟ ᱟᱠᱟ ᱫᱟ ᱱᱮᱡ ᱟᱨ ᱢᱤᱜ ᱦᱚᱲ ᱟᱨ ᱫᱚᱥᱟᱨ ᱦᱚᱲ ᱨᱚ ᱟᱯᱱᱟᱨ ᱨᱮᱭᱟᱜ ᱵᱮᱣᱦᱟᱨ ᱦᱩᱭᱩᱜ ᱡᱳᱨᱩᱲᱟ᱾

==== Devanagari Script ====
जत लेकान मोन आर अधिकार रेयाक आधार रे मुचोत धाबिच स्वतन्त्र आर सुमान को हुयुकआ। उनको हो बुद्धि आर बुझहौ को आगु तोरा बाका दानेच आर मिक हड आर दोसार हड र आप्नार रेयाक व्यवहार हुयुक जोरुडा॥

==== English ====
All human beings are born free and equal in dignity and rights. They are endowed with reason and conscience and should act towards one another in a spirit of brotherhood.

==== Glossed and translated ====
dʒɔtɔ lekan mon ar ɔdhikar-reaˀk adhar-rɛ mutʃot dhabiˀtʃ swɔtɔntrɔ ar suman-ko huju-ʔ=ko=a
all kind human and rights-GEN dignity-LOC birth at free and equal-3PL COP-MID=3PL.SUBJ=IND
'All human beings, with respect to rights and in dignity, at birth free and equal are.'

unko hɔ̃ buddhi ar budʒhhɔ=ko əgu-tor-a baka daneˀtʃ ar miˀt hɔɽ ar dɔsar hɔɽ rɔ apnar-reaˀk jawɔhar huju-ˀk dʒəruɽa
They also intelligence and judgement=3PL bring-with-IND therefore one.another and one man and other person towards own-GEN.INAN behaviour COP-MID should
'They also reason and understanding given-with; therefore toward one another, one person toward another person, in their own conduct should act.'

=== Text 2: Stepmother ===
The following Santali story was narrated by a Santal man, age 40, from Jitpur village, Jamtara, Santal Parganas, Jharkhand, and was collected, translated, and annotated by Ghosh (2008).

Kɔki gɔ "Stepmother"

miˀt tɛˀtʃ tʃasa-hɔɽ=e tahɛ̃kan-a
one CLF farmer-man=3SG.SUBJ COP.IMPERF-IND
There was a farmer.

uni-rɛn ɛra dɔ əɖi khaʈoa hɔɽ=e tahɛ̃kan-a
he-GEN wife TOP very diligent person=3SG.SUBJ COP.IMPERF-IND
He had a diligent wife.

unkin-rɛn miˀt tɛˀtʃ koɽa gidrə tahɛ̃kan-takin-a
they.DU-GEN one CLF boy child COP.IMPERF-3DU.POSS-IND
They had a son.

unkin dɔ din-ge əɖi kurumuʈu=kin kəmi-ja mɛnkhan tʃheka-katɛ=je miˀt din uni hɔɽ-rɛn oraˀk boŋga dɔ bɔhɔˀk laˀtʃ haso ɲam-ke-d-e-a
they.DU TOP day-FOC very diligently=3DU.SUBJ work-IND but how-CONV=3SG.SUBJ one day s/he man-GEN house goddess TOP head stomach pain get-ACT.AOR-TR-3SG.OBJ-IND
They two work very hard, but one day for unknown reason the man's wife was affected by pain in stomach and head.

ar atʃka ge unkin apa hɔn bəgi-aˀt-kin-a=e
and suddenly EMPH they.DU father son leave-ACT.APPL.PST-3DU.OBJ-IND=3SG.SUBJ
Soon she passed away, leaving behind her husband and son.

khan əɖi duk-rɛ=kin paɽao-en-a
then very trouble-LOC=3DU.SUBJ fall-MID.AOR-IND
Thereafter these two faced lots of problems.

kəmi hɔ̃ nit dɔ baŋ=kin kəmi-daɽe-aˀk-kan-a
work even now TOP NEG=3DU.SUBJ work-ABIL-MID-IPFV-IND
They could not even go to work.

tʃedaˀk dʒe majdʒiu kəmi-ko dɔ ar unkin oɽaˀk-rɛ ekkal bənu-ˀk-ko-wa
because that woman worker-PL TOP and they.DU house-LOC absolutely NEG.COP-MID-3PL.OBJ-IND
The absence of a woman to take care of household chores led to this situation.

adɔ ajma hudis-baɽa-katɛ miˀt teˀtʃ kəki-gɔ=kin saŋgha əgu-ke-d-e-a
thereupon much though-about-CONV one CLF aunt-mother=3DU.SUBJ marry.a.widow bring-ACT.AOR-TR-3SG.OBJ-IND
Thereupon after a lot of contemplation, they brought a stepmother for the boy by sangha marriage.

uni əgu-katɛ thora din dɔ thik-ge din=ko khema-ke-d-a
he bring-CONV some day TOP right-EMPH day=3PL.SUBJ pass-ACT.AOR-TR-IND
After she arrived, things worked well for sometime.

inə tajɔm dɔ uni gidrə kəki gɔ-aˀk mɛˀt samaŋ-rɛ dɔ əɖi sikiɽ-ge ɲɛl-e-a
just.that after TOP that boy aunt mother-GEN eye front-LOC TOP very hate-EMPH see-3SG.OBJ-IND
After sometime the boy was looked upon with hatred by the stepmother.

adɔ ona-tɛ miˀt din uni ajo dɔ atʃ-rɛn hɛrɛl-tɛˀt=e met-a-e-kan-a nui gidrə do jãhã-sɛn idi-oʈo-ka-e-mɛ ar baŋkhan goˀtʃ-giɖi-ka-e-me
thereupon that-INS one day that woman TOP 3SG-GEN husband-DEF=3SG.SUBJ say-ACT.APPL-3SG.OBJ-IPFV-IND this boy TOP any-to drive-away-BEN-3SG.OBJ-2SG.IMP and otherwise kill-off-BEN-3SG.OBJ-2SG.IMP
One day the woman told her husband, "Drive away the child anywhere or otherwise kill him."

khan hɛrɛl-tɛˀt ona katha aɲdʒɔm-toraj tiŋgiˀt-gɔˀt-en-a
then husband-DEF that word listen-away deafen-TEL-MID.AOR-IND
Having heard that the husband felt as if he had been deafened.

ar mɔnɛ mɔnɛ-tɛ mɛn-jɔŋ-an-a dʒe nui ajo dɔ tʃit katha=e met-ad-iɲ-a
and mind mind-LOC say-MPASS-MID.APPL.PST-IND that this woman TOP what word=3SG.SUBJ say-ACT.APPL.PST-1SG.OBJ-IND
He reflected over what the woman told him.

adɔ əɖi hudis-rɛ=e parao-en-a
then very think-LOC=3SG.SUBJ fall-MID.AOR-IND
He then fell into deep thought.

adɔ=e kuli-ruəɽ-ke-d-e-a tʃedaˀk-em əɽis-a-e-kan-a?
then=3SG.SUBJ ask-return-ACT.AOR-TR-3SG.OBJ-IND why=2SG.SUBJ worry-ACT.APPL.PRES-3SG.OBJ-IPFV-IND
He asked her, "What bothers you about the boy?"

adɔ uni ajo=e rɔɽ-ruəɽ-ke-d-a 'hɛ̃, iɲ dɔ əɽis-gi=ɲ ɲɛl-e-kan-a'
then that woman=3SG.SUBJ tell-return-ACT.AOR-TR-IND yes I TOP worry-EMPH=1SG.SUBJ see-3SG.OBJ-IPFV-IND
Then she replied, "I am looking at him with great fear."

khan hɛrɛl-tɛˀt=e mɛn-ke-d-a 'am-ge ləi-mɛ tɔbe tʃikə-katɛ=ɲ gɔdʒ-e-a'
then husband-DEF=3SG.SUBJ say-ACT.AOR-TR-IND you-EMPH tell-2SG.IMP then how-CONV=1SG.SUBJ kill-3SG.OBJ-IND
He told her, "Suggest to me how to kill him."

adɔ uni ajo=e ləi-a-e-kan-a, 'am-ak' isi dɔ dʒɔkhɔn si-oˀk-ben dʒɔɽao-idi-a un dʒɔkhen gidrə dɔ laha-ka-e-mɛ ar am dɔ tajɔm-re si-mɛ ar am-rɛn ɖaŋ-ra khub laga laga-kin-mɛ
then that woman=3SG.SUBJ tell-ACT.APPL-3SG.OBJ-IPFV-IND you-GEN plough TOP when plough-MID=2DU.SUBJ link-continue-IND that time boy TOP front-BEN-3SG.OBJ-2SG.IMP and you TOP behind-LOC plough-2SG.IMP and you-GEN bullock very drive drive-3DU.OBJ-2SG.IMP
She suggested, "When you two go to work in the field, you should link your plough then keep the child in front of you, and you plough from behind driving your bullocks very hard."

un dʒɔkhen-ge uni gidrə dɔ ona isi-tɛ=e gutu gɔdʒɔ-ˀk-a
that time-EMPH that boy TOP that plough-INS=3SG.SUBJ insert kill-MID-IND
"Then the child will die being pierced by the yoke." She continued.

khan ona aɲdʒɔm-katɛ goʈa bəd bəjhar=kin si-tʃaba-ke-d-a
then that listen-CONV whole upland low.land=3DU.SUBJ plough-finish-ACT.AOR-TR-IND
After that the father and son ploughed up the whole high land and low land for many days.

mɛnkhan uni gidrə gɔdʒ-e-ləgiˀt okte-ge baŋ hɛˀtʃ-len-a
but that boy kill-3SG.OBJ-for time-EMPH NEG come-MID.ANT-IND
But he never got around to killing his son.

khan ajo=e mɛn-ke-d-a, 'saman khɛt=ben si-tʃaba-ke-d-a adɔ ɛnrɛ hɔ̃ nui gidrə dɔ ba=m gɔˀtʃ-daɽe-ad-e-a'
then woman=3SG.SUBJ say-ACT.AOR-TR-IND whole land=2DU.SUBJ plough-finish-ACT.AOR-TR-IND yet still even this boy TOP NEG=2SG.SUBJ kill-ABIL-ACT.APPL.PST-3SG.OBJ-IND
The woman told the farmer, "You have ploughed the whole field and still you could not kill the boy."

khan ona ɔkte uni ajo gidrə gɔdʒ-e-ləgiˀt miˀt ʈɛˀtʃ kuɽpaɽ-ke-d-a
then that time that woman boy kill-3SG.OBJ-for one CLF make.suggestion-ACT.AOR-TR-IND
Then the woman made another suggestion on how to kill the boy.

met-ad-e-a=e 'hana ʈənɖi-rɛ gundli=bon tʃas-akaˀt ona-ge si-ben'
say-ACT.APPL.PST-3SG.OBJ-IND=3SG.SUBJ that.far plains-LOC millet=1PL.SUBJ cultivate-ACT.PRF that-EMPH plough-2DU.IMP
She told the farmer, "In that far off plain (where) you plough for our millet cultivation."

un dʒɔkhɛˀtʃ-ge uni gidrə dɔ ona isi-tɛ sɔb-ɔˀk gɔˀtʃ-otʃo-je-m
that time-EMPH that boy TOP that plough-INS pierce-MID die-CAUS-3SG.OBJ-2SG.IMP
"At that time when you are ploughing that field, let the boy die by being pierced by the yoke", she said.

ar ona dʒajga-rɛ dɔ ɛʈaˀk tʃas=laŋ lagao-a
and that place-LOC TOP any cultivate=1DU.SUBJ applu-IND
"And in that piece of land we will cultivate other crops."

dɔ uni hɛrɛl-tɛˀt dɔ ona-ge hɛ̃-ad-a
thereupon that husband-DEF TOP that-EMPH yes-ACT.APPL.PST-IND
The farmer told her he would do as she told him.

khan dɔsar hiloˀk-ge setaˀk-ge gidrə=e met-a-e-kan-a 'dɛlaŋ-ʈa si-oˀk=laŋ idi-a'
then second day-EMPH morning-LOC boy=3SG.SUBJ say-ACT.APPL-3SG.OBJ-IPFV-IND look-DEF plough-INAN=1DU.SUBJ take-IND
The next morning he told his son, "Look child, we will take the plough."

'ona gundli-laŋ si-otʃo-g-a ar ɛʈaˀk tʃas=bon lagao-a'
that millet=1DU.SUBJ plough-CAUS-MID-IND and another cultivate=1PL.SUBJ apply-IND
"We will plough up the millet and cultivate another crop."

'khan koɽa gidrə rɔɽ-ruəɽ-ke-d-a 'hɛnda baba, ona gundli ma bili-dʒut-akan-a'
then boy child tell-return-ACT.AOR-TR-IND oh father that millet MOD ripe-properly-MID.PRF-IND
Then the boy replied, "Oh father, that millet has ripened."

gapa mɛaŋ khan-ge dʒɔm-dʒut-uˀk-a
tomorrow after.tomorrow then-EMPH eat-suitable-MID-IND
"Tomorrow or the day after it will be edible."

ona dɔ tʃedaˀk-laŋ si-bəridʒ-a
that TOP why=1DU.SUBJ plough-waste-IND
"Why shall we waste the crop by ploughing?"

khan uni gidrə-rɛn apa-ˀt-tetˀ=e hudis-ke-d-a, 'səri-ge nui gidrə dɔ bhage solha-ge=i ləi-a-ɲ-kan-a'
then that boy-GEN father-INAL-DEF=3SG.SUBJ think-ACT.AOR-TR-IND right-EMPH this boy TOP good advice-EMPH=3SG.SUBJ tell-ACT.APPL-1SG.OBJ-IPFV-IND
The farmer thought, "The child is giving me advice in good spirit."

adɔ mɔnɛ mɔnɛ-tɛ hudis-dʒɔn-kan-a=e
thereupon mind mind-LOC think-MPASS-IPFV-IND=3SG.SUBJ
He then made up his mind.

hudis-katɛ gidrə-rɛn apa-t-tɛˀt dɔ aˀtʃ-rɛn ajo=e met-ad-e-a, 'iɲ dɔ nui gidrə dɔ oho=ɲ gɔˀtʃ-daɽe-ke-a'
think-CONV boy-GEN father-INAL-DEF TOP 3SG-GEN wife=3SG.SUBJ say-ACT.APPL.PST-3SG.OBJ-IND I TOP this boy TOP NEG.EMPH=1SG.SUBJ kill-ABIL-ACT.OPT-IND
He told his wife, "I can never kill this boy."

ona aɲdʒɔm-sãotɛ uni ajo dɔ əɖi raŋgao-gɔˀt-en-a=e ar boge-tɛ=kin dʒhogɽa-en-a
that listen-with that wife TOP very get.angry-TEL-MID.AOR-IND=3SG.SUBJ and good-INS=3DU.SUBJ quarrel-MID.AOR-IND
On hearing that the woman became very angry and quarrelled with him.

adɔ uni ajo dɔ=e laga-giɖi-kad-e-a
then that woman TOP=3SG.SUBJ drive-away-ACT.BEN.PST-3SG.OBJ-IND
Then he drove the woman away.

mutʃɛˀt-en-a
finish-MID.AOR-IND
The story ends here.

== See also ==
- Languages of India
- Languages with official status in India
- List of Indian languages by total speakers
- National Translation Mission
- Santali Wikipedia
- Ol Chiki script

== Bibliography ==
=== Books ===
- Byomkes Chakrabarti (1992). A comparative study of Santali and Bengali. Calcutta: K.P. Bagchi & Co. ISBN 81-7074-128-9
- Hansda, Kali Charan (2015). Fundamental of Santhal Language. Sambalpur.
- Hembram, P. C. (2002). Santali, a natural language. New Delhi: U. Hembram.
- Newberry, J. (2000). North Munda dialects: Mundari, Santali, Bhumia. Victoria, B.C.: J. Newberry. ISBN 0-921599-68-4
- Mitra, P. C. (1988). Santali, the base of world languages. Calcutta: Firma KLM.
- Зограф Г. А. (1960/1990). Языки Южной Азии. М.: Наука (1-е изд., 1960).
- Лекомцев, Ю. K. (1968). Некоторые характерные черты сантальского предложения // Языки Индии, Пакистана, Непала и Цейлона: материалы научной конференции. М: Наука, 311–321.
- Grierson, George A. (1906). Linguistic Survey of India. Vol. IV, Mundā and Dravidian languages. Calcutta: Office of the Superintendent of Government Printing, India.
- Maspero, Henri. (1952). Les langues mounda. Meillet A., Cohen M. (dir.), Les langues du monde, P.: CNRS.
- Neukom, Lukas (2001). Santali. München: LINCOM Europa.
- Pinnow, Heinz-Jürgen. (1966). A comparative study of the verb in the Munda languages. Zide, Norman H. (ed.) Studies in comparative Austroasiatic linguistics. London—The Hague—Paris: Mouton, 96–193.
- Sakuntala De. (2011). Santali : a linguistic study. Memoir (Anthropological Survey of India). Kolkata: Anthropological Survey of India, Govt. of India.
- Vermeer, Hans J. (1969). Untersuchungen zum Bau zentral-süd-asiatischer Sprachen (ein Beitrag zur Sprachbundfrage). Heidelberg: J. Groos.
- 2006-d. Santali. In E. K. Brown (ed.) Encyclopedia of Languages and Linguistics. Oxford: Elsevier Press.

=== Linguistic journals ===
- Sebeok, Thomas A. (1943). "Phonemic System of Santali". Journal of the American Oriental Society. 63 (1): 66–67. doi:10.2307/594152. JSTOR 594152.
- Neukom, Lukas (2000). "Argument Marking in Santali". The Mon-Khmer Studies Journal. 30: 95–113. doi:10.15144/MKSJ-30.95.
- Evans, Nicholas; Osada, Toshiki (2005). "Mundari: The myth of a language without word classes". Linguistic Typology. 9 (3): 351-390. doi:10.1515/lity.2005.9.3.351. hdl:1885/54663. S2CID 121706232.
- Peterson, John M. (2005). "There's a grain of truth in every "myth", or, Why the discussion of lexical classes in Mundari isn't quite over yet". Linguistic Typology. 9 (3): 391–405.
- Hengeveld, Kees; Rijkhoff, Jan (2005). "Mundari as a Flexible Language". Linguistic Typology. 9 (3): 406–431.
- Croft, William (2005). "Word classes, parts of speech, and syntactic argumentation". Linguistic Typology. 9 (3): 431–441.

=== Comparative studies ===
- Osada, Toshiki (1996). "Notes on the Proto-Kherwarian vowel system". Indo-Iranian Journal. 39: 245–258. doi:10.1007/BF00161864.
- Anderson, Gregory D. S. (2007). The Munda verb: typological perspectives. Trends in linguistics. Vol. 174. Berlin: Mouton de Gruyter. ISBN 978-3-11-018965-0.
- Peterson, John M. (2010). "Language contact in Jharkhand: Linguistic convergence between Munda and Indo-Aryan in eastern-central India". Himalayan Linguistics. 9 (2): 56–86. doi:10.5070/H99223479.
- Peterson, John M. (2013). "Parts of speech in Kharia: a formal account". In Rijkhoff, Jan; Lier, Eva Helena van (eds.). Flexible word classes: typological studies of underspecified parts of speech (1 ed.). Oxford: Oxford University Press. pp. 131–168. doi:10.1093/acprof:oso/9780199668441.003.0005. ISBN 978-0-19-966844-1.
- Rau, Felix (2013). "Proper names, predicates, and the parts-of-speech system of Santali". In Rijkhoff, Jan; Lier, Eva Helena van (eds.). Flexible word classes: typological studies of underspecified parts of speech (1 ed.). Oxford: Oxford University Press. pp. 169–184. doi:10.1093/acprof:oso/9780199668441.003.0006. ISBN 978-0-19-966844-1.
- Anderson, Gregory D. S. (2014). "Overview of the Munda languages". In Jenny, Mathias; Sidwell, Paul (eds.). The Handbook of Austroasiatic Languages. Leiden: Brill. pp. 364–414. doi:10.1163/9789004283572_006. ISBN 978-90-04-28295-7.
- Peterson, John M. (2015). "Introduction – advances in the study of Munda languages". Journal of South Asian Languages and Linguistics. 2 (2): 149–162. doi:10.1515/jsall-2015-0008.
- Peterson, John M. (2017). "Jharkhand as a 'Linguistic Area': Language Contact Between Indo-Aryan and Munda in Eastern-Central South Asia". In Hickey, Raymond (ed.). The Cambridge Handbook of Areal Linguistics. Cambridge University Press. pp. 551–574. doi:10.1017/9781107279872.021.
- Anderson, Gregory D. S.; Jora, Bikram (2023). "A Typology of Grammatical, Local/Directional and Instrumental Markers in Kherwarian Languages". In Ring, Hiram; Sidwell, Paul (eds.). Papers from the Eighth International Conference on Austroasiatic Linguistics. JSEALS Special Publication No. 11. University of Hawai'i Press. pp. 1–14.
- Anderson, Gregory D. S. (2020). "Proto-Munda Prosody, Morphotactics and Morphosyntax in South Asian and Austroasiatic Contexts". In Jenny, Mathias; Sidwell, Paul; Alves, Mark (eds.). Austroasiatic Syntax in Areal and Diachronic Perspective. Brill. pp. 157–197. doi:10.1163/9789004425606_008. ISBN 978-90-04-42560-6.
- Anderson, Gregory D. S.; Jora, Bikram (2020). "Proto-Kherwarian Negation, TAM and Person-Indexing Interdependencies". In Jenny, Mathias; Sidwell, Paul; Alves, Mark (eds.). Austroasiatic Syntax in Areal and Diachronic Perspective. Brill. pp. 236–257. doi:10.1163/9789004425606_010.
- Dilip, Mayuri; Kumar, Rajesh; V. Subbārāo, Kārumūri; Rao, G. Maheshwar; Everaert, Martin (2020). "Relative Clauses in Santali: A Matching Analysis Approach". In Jenny, Mathias; Sidwell, Paul; Alves, Mark (eds.). Austroasiatic Syntax in Areal and Diachronic Perspective. Brill. pp. 258–283. doi:10.1163/9789004425606_011.
- Kisku, Sarada Prasad; Murmu, Ganesh; Choksi, Nishaant (2020). "Expressives in the Santali Poetry of Sadhu Ramchand Murmu". In Badenoch, Nathan; Choksi, Nishaant (eds.). Expressives in the South Asian Linguistic Area. Brill. pp. 223–236. doi:10.1163/9789004439153_011. ISBN 978-90-04-43915-3.
- Subbarao, K. V.; Everaert, Martin (2021). "Agreement Reversal in Munda Languages: An Interplay of Functional/Thematic and Syntactic Criteria". In Mohan, Shailendra (ed.). Advances in Munda Linguistics. Cambridge Scholars Publishing. pp. 108–130. ISBN 978-1527570474.
- Kobayashi, Masato (2021). "The Past Suffixes of Hill Korwa". In Mohan, Shailendra (ed.). Advances in Munda Linguistics. Cambridge Scholars Publishing. pp. 142–150. ISBN 978-1527570474.
- Anderson, Gregory D. S.; Jora, Bikram (2021). "Typologically Quirky Characteristics of Past and Perfective Forms in Kherwarian". In Mohan, Shailendra (ed.). Advances in Munda Linguistics. Cambridge Scholars Publishing. pp. 151–169. ISBN 1527570479.
- Paudyal, Netra P.; Peterson, John M. (2021). "How one language became four: the impact of different contact-scenarios between "Sadani" and the tribal languages of Jharkhand". Journal of South Asian Languages and Linguistics. 7 (2): 327–358. doi:10.1515/jsall-2021-2028. ISSN 2196-078X. S2CID 233732014.
- Dash, Biswadath (2025). "Verbalization as Re-categorization of Lexical Categories in Santali". In Greenson, Daniel; Haldar, Shrayana; Mishra, Anushree; Sharma, Aidan (eds.). Proceedings of FASAL-14, eds. Daniel Greeson, Shrayana Haldar, Anushree Mishra & Aidan Sharma. Stony Brook, NY: Stony Brook University. pp. 119–134.
- Creissels, Denis; Bertinetto, Pier Marco; Ciucci, Luca (2025). "Non-verbal predication: An analytical framework". Non-verbal predication in the world's languages: A typological survey. Volume 1: Eurasia, North America, South America (Comparative Handbooks of Linguistics 9). Vol. 9. De Gruyter Mouton. p. 3-55. doi:10.1515/9783110730982-001. ISBN 978-3-11-073632-8.
- Lier, Eva van, ed. (2023). The Oxford Handbook of Word Classes. Oxford University Press. doi:10.1093/oxfordhb/9780198852889.001.0001. ISBN 978-0-19188-7-185.

=== Dictionaries ===
- Bodding, Paul O. (1929). A Santal dictionary. Oslo: J. Dybwad.
- A. R. Campbell (1899). A Santali-English dictionary. Santal Mission Press.
- Cole F. T. (1879) Glossary of Santali. Indian antiquary 8.
- Martin, W. (1898). English-Santali dictionary. Benares: Medical Hall Press.
- English-Santali/Santali-English dictionaries
- Macphail, R. M. (1964). An Introduction to Santali, Parts I & II. Benagaria: The Santali Literature Board, Santali Christian Council.
- Minegishi, M., & Murmu, G. (2001). Santali basic lexicon with grammatical notes. Tōkyō: Institute for the Languages and Cultures of Asia and Africa, Tokyo University of Foreign Studies. ISBN 4-87297-791-2

=== Grammars and primers ===
- Bodding, Paul O. 1929/1952. A Santal Grammar for the Beginners, Benagaria: Santal Mission of the Northern Churches (1st edition, 1929).
- Cole, F. T. (1896). Santạli primer. Manbhum: Santal Mission Press.
- Macphail, R. M. (1953) An Introduction to Santali. Firma KLM Private Ltd.
- Muscat, George. (1989) Santali: A New Approach. Sahibganj, Bihar : Santali Book Depot.
- Philips, Jeremiah. (1845) A Santali Primer. Calcutta: School Book Society.
- Philips, Jeremiah. (1852) An Introduction to the Santali Language. Calcutta: School Book Society.
- Skrefsrud, Lars Olsen (1873). A Grammar of the Santhal Language. Benares: Medical Hall Press.
- Boxwell, J. (1887). On the Santali language. Transactions of the Philological Society 1887.
- Saren, Jagneswar "Ranakap Santali Ronor" (Progressive Santali Grammar), 1st edition, 2012.

=== Literature ===
- Mitchell, J. Murray. (1875) Santali songs with translations and notes. Indian antiquary 4.
- Cole, F. T. (1875) Santali folklores. Indian antiquary 4.
- Pandit Raghunath Murmu (1925) ronor: Mayurbhanj, Odisha Publisher ASECA, Mayurbhanj
- Bodding, Paul O., (ed.) (1923–1929) Santali Folk Tales. Oslo: Institutet for sammenlingenden kulturforskning, Publikationen. Vol. I—III.
- Campbell, A. (1891). Santal folk tales. Pokhuria, India: Santal Mission Press.
- Murmu, G., & Das, A. K. (1998). Bibliography, Santali literature. Calcutta: Biswajnan. ISBN 81-7525-080-1
- Santali Genesis Translation.
- The Dishom Beura, India's First Santali Daily News Paper. Publisher, Managobinda Beshra, National Correspondent: Mr. Somenath Patnaik
