= Lars Olsen Skrefsrud =

Norwegian missionary

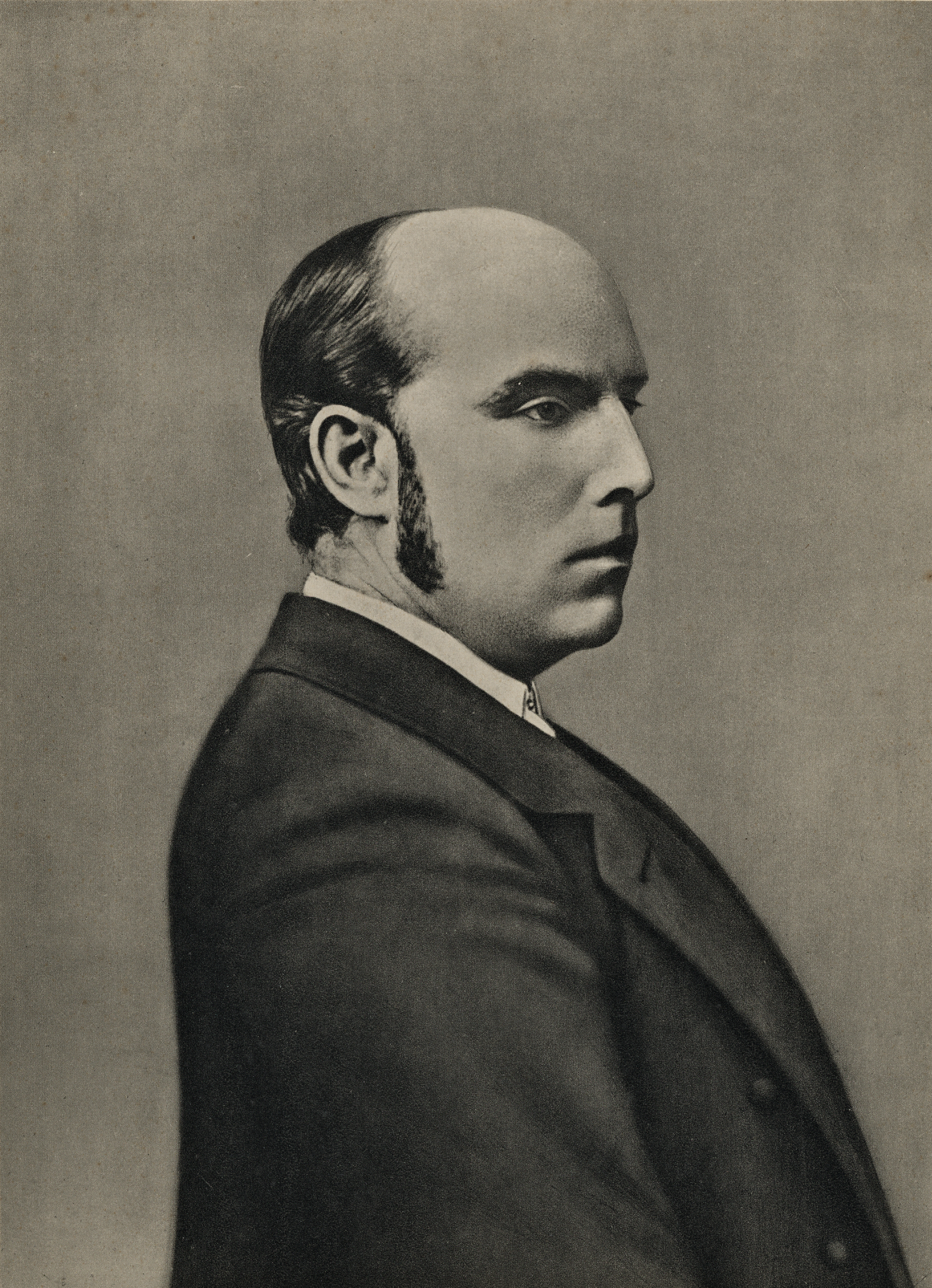
Portrait of Lars Olsen Skrefsrud

Lars Olsen Skrefsrud (4 February 1840 – 11 December 1910) was a Norwegian Lutheran missionary and language researcher in India.

== Biography ==
Skrefsrud came from Fåberg Municipality situated north of Lillehammer in Oppland county, Norway. As a young man he was imprisoned for three years, and during his incarceration started to both read the Bible and study languages. Upon his release, he studied at the missionary school of Johannes Evangelista Goßner in Berlin, where he was prepared for his mission.

In 1863, he left for India. Together with Hans Peter Børresen he is regarded as the founder of the Norwegian Santal Mission (Den norske Santalmisjon) (from 2001 a part of Normisjon). Skrefsrud learned the language of the Hindi, Bengali and Sanskrit. He published a songbook in the Santali language with Christian texts for local melodies and later a grammar for the Santal people. In 1881–83, he traveled to Denmark and Norway to gain support for the mission. In 1882, he was ordained by Bishop Carl Peter Parelius Essendrop in Kristiania (now Oslo).

Skrefsrud died during 1910 in the village of Benagaria in Jharkhand, India. He was followed at the mission by the missionary, linguist and folklorist Paul Olaf Bodding. The mission he established in India has grown to a church with over 150,000 members in the Indian states of Jharkhand, Bihar, West Bengal and Assam. In the 1950s it became an independent institution - The Northern Evangelical Lutheran Church (NELC).

== Related reading ==
- Ivar Saeter (1935) Lars Olsen Skrefsrud, der Gründer der Santalmission (Stuttgart : Evang. Missionsverlag)
