= Paul Olaf Bodding =

Norwegian missionary, linguist and folklorist

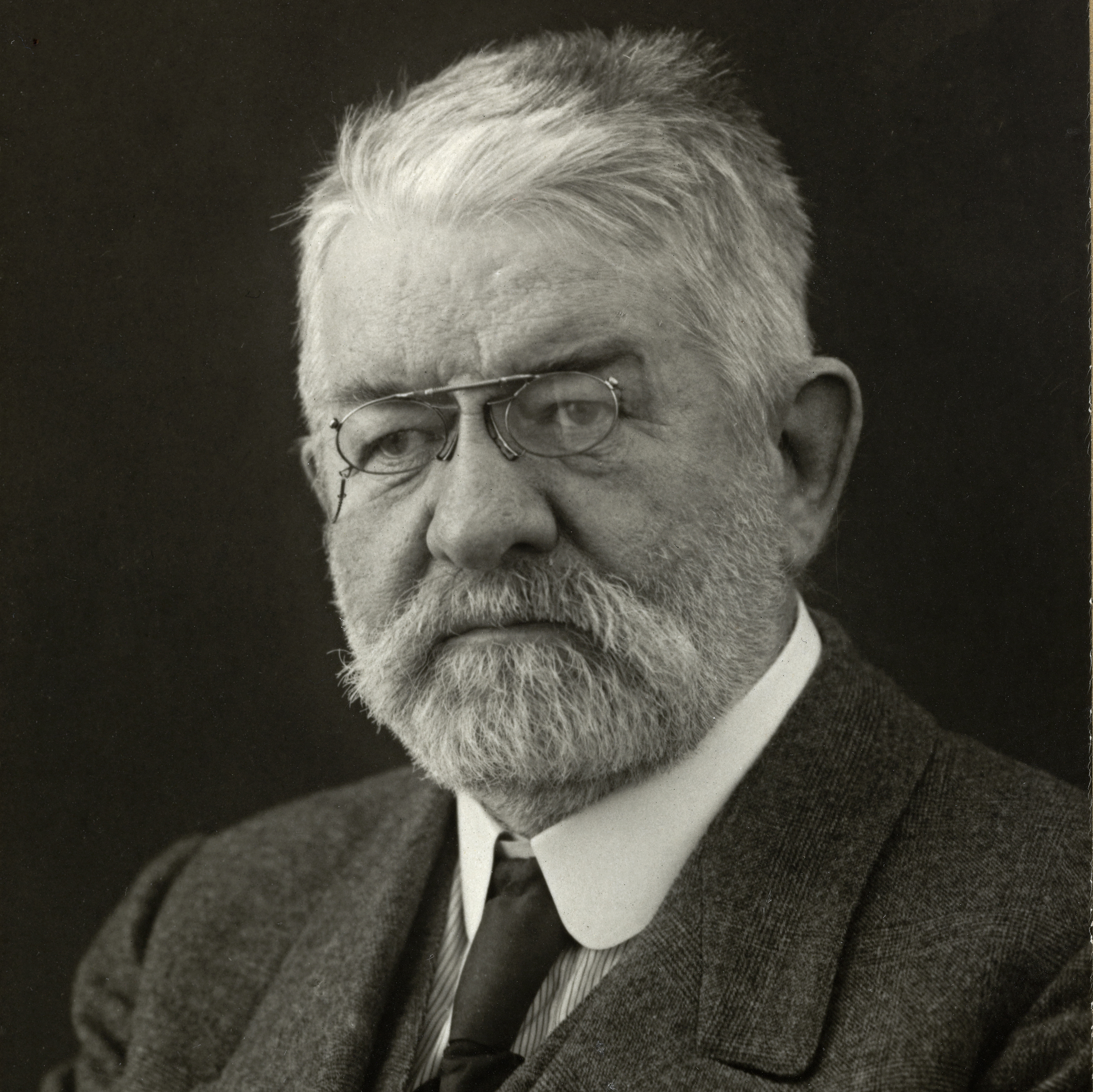
Paul Olaf Bodding

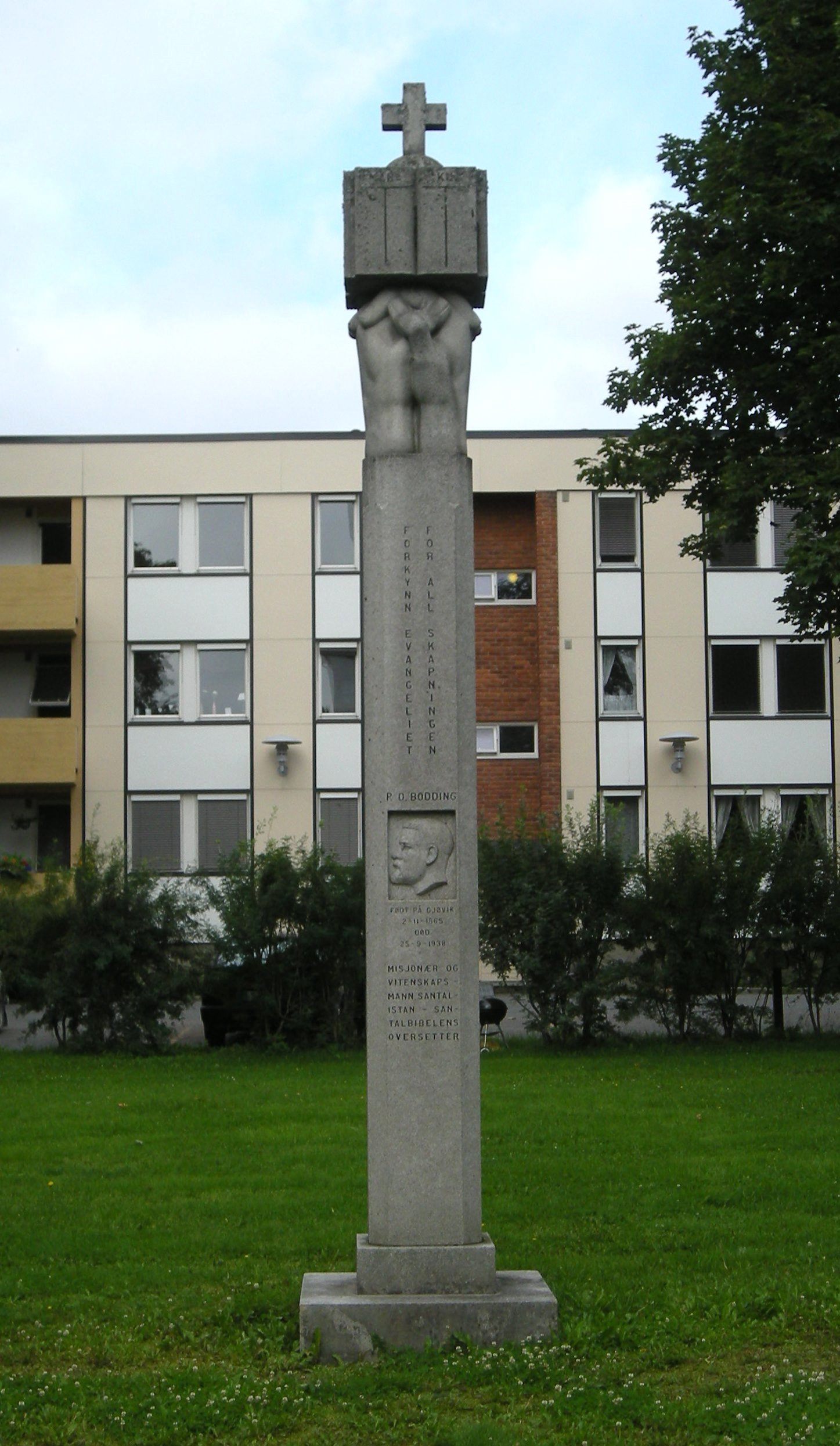
Monument to Paul Olaf Bodding at Gjøvik Church

Paul Olaf Bodding (2 November 1865 – 25 September 1938) was a Norwegian missionary, linguist and folklorist.

== Biography ==
Paul Olaf Bodding was born at Gjøvik in Oppland, Norway. He was the son of Edward Olsen Bodding (1825–1905) and Betzy Emilie Wennevold (1838–1889). Bodding was the son of a bookseller, and he first met the founder of The Indian Home Mission to the Santals (later developed to the NELC), Lars Olsen Skrefsrud, in his father's bookshop in Gjøvik. Skrefsrud was born just outside the neighbouring town Lillehammer, in Oppland. Bodding studied theology at the University of Kristiania (now University of Oslo) and graduated in 1889.

In 1890, he arrived in Santalistan (Santal Parganas) as a missionary priest. When Skrefsrud died in 1909, Bodding took over as the leader of the Norwegian missionary organization Santaline Mission (Den norske Santalmisjon). He served in India for 44 years (1889–1933), and operated mainly from the town Dumka in the Santhal Parganas-district. In 1914 Bodding also completed the translation of the Bible into the Santali language.

He is still well known among the santal living in the states of Jharkhand, Bihar and Assam as well as in Bangladesh and the Scandinavian countries. After returning from India in 1934, Bodding settled with his Danish-born wife Christine Larsen (1883–1940) in Odense, Denmark, where he died during 1938.

Cecil Henry Bompas published Folklore of the Santal Parganas (London: D. Nutt, 1909) compiled from stories collected by P. O. Bodding. In 2006, Olav Hodne issued a biography in his book Oppreisning. A monument to Bodding stands in front of Gjøvik church in Oppland.

== Works ==
- Materials for a Santali Grammar I, Dumka 1922
- A Chapter of Santal Folklore, Oslo 1924
- Santal Folk Tales (3 volumes), 1925–29
- Studies in Santal Medicine and Connected Folklore (3 volumes), 1925–40
- A Santal Dictionary (5 volumes), 1933–36
- Santal Riddles and Witchcraft among the Santals, 1940

== Other sources ==
- Friedrich Wilhelm Bautz (1975). "Paul Olaf Bodding". In Bautz, Friedrich Wilhelm (ed.). Biographisch-Bibliographisches Kirchenlexikon (BBKL) (in German). Vol. 1. Hamm: Bautz. col. 643. ISBN 3-88309-013-1.
- Olav Hodne (2006) Oppreisning, Misjonæren og vitenskapsmannen Paul Olav Bodding (Oslo:Luther forlag) ISBN 8253133316
