= List of common Chinese surnames =

These are lists of the most common Chinese surnames in the People's Republic of China (Hong Kong, Macau, and Mainland China), the Republic of China (Taiwan), and the Chinese diaspora overseas as provided by government or academic sources. Chinese names also form the basis for many common Cambodian, Japanese, Korean, and Vietnamese surnames, and to an extent, Filipino surnames in both translation and transliteration into those languages.

The conception of China as consisting of the "old hundred families" (Chinese: 老百姓; pinyin: Lǎo Bǎi Xìng; lit. 'Old Hundred Surnames') is an ancient and traditional one, the most notable tally being the Song-era Hundred Family Surnames (百家姓; Bǎi Jiā Xìng). Even today, the number of surnames in China is a little over 4,000, while the 2000 United States census found there are more than 6.2 million surnames altogether and that the number of surnames held by 100 or more Americans (per name) was just over 150,000.

The Chinese expression "Three Zhang Four Li" (simplified Chinese: 张三李四; traditional Chinese: 張三李四; pinyin: Zhāng Sān Lǐ Sì) is used to mean "anyone" or "everyone", but the most common surnames are currently Wang in mainland China and Chen in Taiwan. A commonly cited factoid from the 1990 edition of the Guinness Book of World Records estimated that Zhang was the most common surname in the world, but no comprehensive information from China was available at the time and more recent editions have not repeated the claim. However, Zhang Wei (张伟) is the most common full name in mainland China.

The top five surnames in China – Wang, Li, Zhang, Liu, Chen – are also the top five surnames in the world, each with over 70-100 million worldwide.

== China ==
This list of the 100 most common Chinese surnames derives from China's Ministry of Public Security's annual report on the top 100 surnames in China, with the latest report release in January 2020 for the year 2019. When the 1982 Chinese census was first published, it did not include a list of top surnames. However, in 2004, the State Post Bureau subsequently used the census data to release a series of commemorative stamps in honor of the then-most-common surnames in 2004.

The summary of the 2007 survey revealed China had approximately 92,881,000 Wangs (7.25% of the population), 92,074,000 Lis (7.19%), and 87,502,000 Zhangs (6.83%).

A 2018 survey showed that Liu and Chen were the next most common China with more than 70 million each.

These top five surnames – Wang, Lee (Li), Zhang, Liu, Chen – alone accounted for more people than Indonesia, the fourth most populous country in the world,

The next five – Yang, Huang, Zhao, Wu, and Zhou – were each shared by more than 20 million Chinese. Twelve more – Xu, Sun, Ma, Zhu, Hu, Guo, He, Gao, Lin, Luo, Zheng, and Liang – were each shared by more than 10 million.

All together, the top hundred surnames accounted for 84.77% of China's population.

=== Surname list ===
Romanizations
Rank	Character		Mandarin		Cantonese		Min Nan		Hakka		Gan		Wu		Other	
2019	Trad.	Simp.	Pinyin	Wade–Giles	HK	Other	POJ (Note: Pronunciations are based on the Xiamen (X), Zhangzhou (Z), Quanzhou (Q), Kaohsiung (K) and Taipei (T) varieties.)	Other	PFS	Other	GP	Other	Shanghainese romanization	Other	Other	
1	王		Wáng	Wang^{2}	Wong	Vang	Ông	Wung; Heng	Vòng	Wong	Uōng	Wong	Waon	Whang	Viet.	Vương
1	王		Wáng	Wang^{2}	Wong	Vang	Ông	Wung; Heng	Vòng	Wong	Uōng	Wong	Waon	Whang	Kor.	Wang (왕)
1	王		Wáng	Wang^{2}	Wong	Vang	Ông	Wung; Heng	Vòng	Wong	Uōng	Wong	Waon	Whang	Jpn.	Ō
1	王		Wáng	Wang^{2}	Wong	Vang	Ông	Wung; Heng	Vòng	Wong	Uōng	Wong	Waon	Whang	Phil.	Ong, Wong, Wang, Heng
2	李		Lǐ	Li^{3}	Lee; Li	Ly	Lí	Lee	Lí	Lee	Lî	Lee	Li	Lee	Viet.	Lý
2	李		Lǐ	Li^{3}	Lee; Li	Ly	Lí	Lee	Lí	Lee	Lî	Lee	Li	Lee	N. Kor.	Ri (리),
2	李		Lǐ	Li^{3}	Lee; Li	Ly	Lí	Lee	Lí	Lee	Lî	Lee	Li	Lee	S. Kor.	Yi, Lee, Rhee (이)
2	李		Lǐ	Li^{3}	Lee; Li	Ly	Lí	Lee	Lí	Lee	Lî	Lee	Li	Lee	Jpn.	Ri
2	李		Lǐ	Li^{3}	Lee; Li	Ly	Lí	Lee	Lí	Lee	Lî	Lee	Li	Lee	Phil.	Dy, Dee, Lee, Li
3	張	张	Zhāng	Chang^{1}	Cheung	Cheong; Chong	Tiuⁿ (X, Q, K, T); Tioⁿ (Z)	Teo; Teoh; Tio	Chông	Chong	Tong	Cheong; Thong	Tsan	Tzan Zan	Viet.	Trương
3	張	张	Zhāng	Chang^{1}	Cheung	Cheong; Chong	Tiuⁿ (X, Q, K, T); Tioⁿ (Z)	Teo; Teoh; Tio	Chông	Chong	Tong	Cheong; Thong	Tsan	Tzan Zan	Kor.	Jang (장)
3	張	张	Zhāng	Chang^{1}	Cheung	Cheong; Chong	Tiuⁿ (X, Q, K, T); Tioⁿ (Z)	Teo; Teoh; Tio	Chông	Chong	Tong	Cheong; Thong	Tsan	Tzan Zan	Jpn.	Chō
3	張	张	Zhāng	Chang^{1}	Cheung	Cheong; Chong	Tiuⁿ (X, Q, K, T); Tioⁿ (Z)	Teo; Teoh; Tio	Chông	Chong	Tong	Cheong; Thong	Tsan	Tzan Zan	Phil.	Tiu
3	張	张	Zhāng	Chang^{1}	Cheung	Cheong; Chong	Tiuⁿ (X, Q, K, T); Tioⁿ (Z)	Teo; Teoh; Tio	Chông	Chong	Tong	Cheong; Thong	Tsan	Tzan Zan	Idn.	Sutiono, Tjong
4	劉	刘	Liú	Liu^{2}	Lau	Lao; Lou; Lưu	Lâu	Lau; Low; Lao	Liù	Liew	Liu	Lew; Lieu	Lieu	Lio	Viet.	Lưu
4	劉	刘	Liú	Liu^{2}	Lau	Lao; Lou; Lưu	Lâu	Lau; Low; Lao	Liù	Liew	Liu	Lew; Lieu	Lieu	Lio	Kor.	Yu/Yoo (유)
4	劉	刘	Liú	Liu^{2}	Lau	Lao; Lou; Lưu	Lâu	Lau; Low; Lao	Liù	Liew	Liu	Lew; Lieu	Lieu	Lio	Phil.	Lao, Lew, Liu
4	劉	刘	Liú	Liu^{2}	Lau	Lao; Lou; Lưu	Lâu	Lau; Low; Lao	Liù	Liew	Liu	Lew; Lieu	Lieu	Lio	Jpn.	Ryū
5	陳	陈	Chén	Ch'en^{2}	Chan	Chun; Chean; Chin	Tân	Tan; Tang; Ting	Chhìn	Chin	Thín	Thin; Chin	Zen	Tchen	Viet.	Trần
5	陳	陈	Chén	Ch'en^{2}	Chan	Chun; Chean; Chin	Tân	Tan; Tang; Ting	Chhìn	Chin	Thín	Thin; Chin	Zen	Tchen	Kor.	Jin (진)
5	陳	陈	Chén	Ch'en^{2}	Chan	Chun; Chean; Chin	Tân	Tan; Tang; Ting	Chhìn	Chin	Thín	Thin; Chin	Zen	Tchen	Phil.	Tan, Chan, Tantoco
5	陳	陈	Chén	Ch'en^{2}	Chan	Chun; Chean; Chin	Tân	Tan; Tang; Ting	Chhìn	Chin	Thín	Thin; Chin	Zen	Tchen	Jpn.	Chin
6	楊	杨	Yáng	Yang^{2}	Yeung	Yeong; Ieong; Young	Iûⁿ (X, Q, K, T); Iôⁿ (Z)	Yeoh; Yeo; Yo; Nyo	Yòng	Yong; Yeong	Iōng	Yeong	Yan	Yang Ian	Viet.	Dương
6	楊	杨	Yáng	Yang^{2}	Yeung	Yeong; Ieong; Young	Iûⁿ (X, Q, K, T); Iôⁿ (Z)	Yeoh; Yeo; Yo; Nyo	Yòng	Yong; Yeong	Iōng	Yeong	Yan	Yang Ian	Kor.	Yang (양)
6	楊	杨	Yáng	Yang^{2}	Yeung	Yeong; Ieong; Young	Iûⁿ (X, Q, K, T); Iôⁿ (Z)	Yeoh; Yeo; Yo; Nyo	Yòng	Yong; Yeong	Iōng	Yeong	Yan	Yang Ian	Phil.	Yu, Young, Yung, Yang, Yongco, Yuchengco
6	楊	杨	Yáng	Yang^{2}	Yeung	Yeong; Ieong; Young	Iûⁿ (X, Q, K, T); Iôⁿ (Z)	Yeoh; Yeo; Yo; Nyo	Yòng	Yong; Yeong	Iōng	Yeong	Yan	Yang Ian	Jpn.	Yō
6	楊	杨	Yáng	Yang^{2}	Yeung	Yeong; Ieong; Young	Iûⁿ (X, Q, K, T); Iôⁿ (Z)	Yeoh; Yeo; Yo; Nyo	Yòng	Yong; Yeong	Iōng	Yeong	Yan	Yang Ian	Misc.	Yana
7	黃	黄	Huáng	Huang^{2}	Wong	Wang; Vong	N̂g (X, Q, K, T); Ûiⁿ (Z)	Ng; Ung; Ooi; Uy; Wee	Vòng	Wong; Wung	Uōng	Wong; Fong	Waon	Whang	Viet.	Hoàng/Huỳnh
7	黃	黄	Huáng	Huang^{2}	Wong	Wang; Vong	N̂g (X, Q, K, T); Ûiⁿ (Z)	Ng; Ung; Ooi; Uy; Wee	Vòng	Wong; Wung	Uōng	Wong; Fong	Waon	Whang	Kor.	Hwang (황)
7	黃	黄	Huáng	Huang^{2}	Wong	Wang; Vong	N̂g (X, Q, K, T); Ûiⁿ (Z)	Ng; Ung; Ooi; Uy; Wee	Vòng	Wong; Wung	Uōng	Wong; Fong	Waon	Whang	Phil.	Ng, Uy, Wee, Wong, Hwang, Huang
7	黃	黄	Huáng	Huang^{2}	Wong	Wang; Vong	N̂g (X, Q, K, T); Ûiⁿ (Z)	Ng; Ung; Ooi; Uy; Wee	Vòng	Wong; Wung	Uōng	Wong; Fong	Waon	Whang	Jpn.	Kō
8	趙	赵	Zhào	Chao^{4}	Chiu	Chu; Chio; Jiu	Tiō (X, Z, K, T); Tiǒ (Q)	Teo; Teoh	Chhau	Chau	Thèu	Cheu; Chew	Zau	Zo	Viet.	Triệu
8	趙	赵	Zhào	Chao^{4}	Chiu	Chu; Chio; Jiu	Tiō (X, Z, K, T); Tiǒ (Q)	Teo; Teoh	Chhau	Chau	Thèu	Cheu; Chew	Zau	Zo	Kor.	Jo (조)
8	趙	赵	Zhào	Chao^{4}	Chiu	Chu; Chio; Jiu	Tiō (X, Z, K, T); Tiǒ (Q)	Teo; Teoh	Chhau	Chau	Thèu	Cheu; Chew	Zau	Zo	Phil.	Tio, Chiu, Chio, Chu
8	趙	赵	Zhào	Chao^{4}	Chiu	Chu; Chio; Jiu	Tiō (X, Z, K, T); Tiǒ (Q)	Teo; Teoh	Chhau	Chau	Thèu	Cheu; Chew	Zau	Zo	Jpn.	Chō
9	吳	吴	Wú	Wu^{2}	Ng	Ung, Eng	Gô͘ Ngô͘ (X, Q, K, T)	Goh	Ǹg	Ng	Ng	Ng	Wu; Ng	Eng Woo	Viet.	Ngô
9	吳	吴	Wú	Wu^{2}	Ng	Ung, Eng	Gô͘ Ngô͘ (X, Q, K, T)	Goh	Ǹg	Ng	Ng	Ng	Wu; Ng	Eng Woo	Kor.	Oh (오)
9	吳	吴	Wú	Wu^{2}	Ng	Ung, Eng	Gô͘ Ngô͘ (X, Q, K, T)	Goh	Ǹg	Ng	Ng	Ng	Wu; Ng	Eng Woo	Jpn.	Go / Kure
9	吳	吴	Wú	Wu^{2}	Ng	Ung, Eng	Gô͘ Ngô͘ (X, Q, K, T)	Goh	Ǹg	Ng	Ng	Ng	Wu; Ng	Eng Woo	Phil.	Go, Ngo, Goh, Wu, Gozon, Gozum, Gochian, Gokongwei, Gosiengfiao
9	吳	吴	Wú	Wu^{2}	Ng	Ung, Eng	Gô͘ Ngô͘ (X, Q, K, T)	Goh	Ǹg	Ng	Ng	Ng	Wu; Ng	Eng Woo	Misc.	Woo
10	周		Zhōu	Chou^{1}	Chow; Chau	Jao, Chau, Chao	Chiu	Chew; Jew	Chiû	Chew; Chiew	Tiu	Chew; Cheu	Tseu	Tzo	Viet.	Chu, Châu
10	周		Zhōu	Chou^{1}	Chow; Chau	Jao, Chau, Chao	Chiu	Chew; Jew	Chiû	Chew; Chiew	Tiu	Chew; Cheu	Tseu	Tzo	Kor.	Ju (주)
10	周		Zhōu	Chou^{1}	Chow; Chau	Jao, Chau, Chao	Chiu	Chew; Jew	Chiû	Chew; Chiew	Tiu	Chew; Cheu	Tseu	Tzo	Jpn.	Shū
10	周		Zhōu	Chou^{1}	Chow; Chau	Jao, Chau, Chao	Chiu	Chew; Jew	Chiû	Chew; Chiew	Tiu	Chew; Cheu	Tseu	Tzo	Phil.	Chiu, Jao, Chow
10	周		Zhōu	Chou^{1}	Chow; Chau	Jao, Chau, Chao	Chiu	Chew; Jew	Chiû	Chew; Chiew	Tiu	Chew; Cheu	Tseu	Tzo	Misc.	Joe
11	徐		Xú	Hsü^{2}	Tsui	Choi; Chui; Tsua	Chhî (X, Z, K, T); Sîr (Q)	Chee; Cher; Cheu; Swee; Ji; Jee	Chhì	Chi	Chhié	Chee; Chui	Zee	Zi	Viet.	Từ
11	徐		Xú	Hsü^{2}	Tsui	Choi; Chui; Tsua	Chhî (X, Z, K, T); Sîr (Q)	Chee; Cher; Cheu; Swee; Ji; Jee	Chhì	Chi	Chhié	Chee; Chui	Zee	Zi	Kor.	Seo (서)
11	徐		Xú	Hsü^{2}	Tsui	Choi; Chui; Tsua	Chhî (X, Z, K, T); Sîr (Q)	Chee; Cher; Cheu; Swee; Ji; Jee	Chhì	Chi	Chhié	Chee; Chui	Zee	Zi	Jpn.	Sho
11	徐		Xú	Hsü^{2}	Tsui	Choi; Chui; Tsua	Chhî (X, Z, K, T); Sîr (Q)	Chee; Cher; Cheu; Swee; Ji; Jee	Chhì	Chi	Chhié	Chee; Chui	Zee	Zi	Phil.	Choi
11	徐		Xú	Hsü^{2}	Tsui	Choi; Chui; Tsua	Chhî (X, Z, K, T); Sîr (Q)	Chee; Cher; Cheu; Swee; Ji; Jee	Chhì	Chi	Chhié	Chee; Chui	Zee	Zi	Idn.	Dharmadjie; Christiadjie
12	孫	孙	Sūn	Sun^{1}	Suen	Sun	Sng (X, Q, K, T); Sun (X, Q, K, T); Suiⁿ (Z)	Sng; Soon	Sûn	Sun	Sun	Suen	Sen	Sun	Viet.	Tôn
12	孫	孙	Sūn	Sun^{1}	Suen	Sun	Sng (X, Q, K, T); Sun (X, Q, K, T); Suiⁿ (Z)	Sng; Soon	Sûn	Sun	Sun	Suen	Sen	Sun	Kor.	Son (손)
12	孫	孙	Sūn	Sun^{1}	Suen	Sun	Sng (X, Q, K, T); Sun (X, Q, K, T); Suiⁿ (Z)	Sng; Soon	Sûn	Sun	Sun	Suen	Sen	Sun	Jpn.	Son
12	孫	孙	Sūn	Sun^{1}	Suen	Sun	Sng (X, Q, K, T); Sun (X, Q, K, T); Suiⁿ (Z)	Sng; Soon	Sûn	Sun	Sun	Suen	Sen	Sun	Phil.	Suan, Soon, Son
13	馬	马	Mǎ	Ma^{3}	Ma	Mah; Mar	Má; Bé (K, T)	Bey; Beh; Baey	Mâ	Ma	Mâ	Mâ	Mo	Mu; Ma	Viet.	Mã
13	馬	马	Mǎ	Ma^{3}	Ma	Mah; Mar	Má; Bé (K, T)	Bey; Beh; Baey	Mâ	Ma	Mâ	Mâ	Mo	Mu; Ma	Kor.	Ma (마)
13	馬	马	Mǎ	Ma^{3}	Ma	Mah; Mar	Má; Bé (K, T)	Bey; Beh; Baey	Mâ	Ma	Mâ	Mâ	Mo	Mu; Ma	Phil.	Ma, Mapua
13	馬	马	Mǎ	Ma^{3}	Ma	Mah; Mar	Má; Bé (K, T)	Bey; Beh; Baey	Mâ	Ma	Mâ	Mâ	Mo	Mu; Ma	Jpn.	Ba
14	朱		Zhū	Chu^{1}	Chu	Chue	Chu	Choo	Chû	Choo	Tu	Chu	Tsy; Tsyu	Tzu; Chu	Viet.	Châu
14	朱		Zhū	Chu^{1}	Chu	Chue	Chu	Choo	Chû	Choo	Tu	Chu	Tsy; Tsyu	Tzu; Chu	Kor.	Ju (주)
14	朱		Zhū	Chu^{1}	Chu	Chue	Chu	Choo	Chû	Choo	Tu	Chu	Tsy; Tsyu	Tzu; Chu	Jpn.	Shu
14	朱		Zhū	Chu^{1}	Chu	Chue	Chu	Choo	Chû	Choo	Tu	Chu	Tsy; Tsyu	Tzu; Chu	Phil.	Chu
14	朱		Zhū	Chu^{1}	Chu	Chue	Chu	Choo	Chû	Choo	Tu	Chu	Tsy; Tsyu	Tzu; Chu	Can.	Gee
14	朱		Zhū	Chu^{1}	Chu	Chue	Chu	Choo	Chû	Choo	Tu	Chu	Tsy; Tsyu	Tzu; Chu	Misc.	Ju
15	胡		Hú	Hu^{2}	Wu	Woo, Vu	Ô͘	Oh; Ow; Aw	Fù	Foo	Ū	Wu; Foo	Wu	Woo	Viet.	Hồ
15	胡		Hú	Hu^{2}	Wu	Woo, Vu	Ô͘	Oh; Ow; Aw	Fù	Foo	Ū	Wu; Foo	Wu	Woo	Kor.	Ho (호)
15	胡		Hú	Hu^{2}	Wu	Woo, Vu	Ô͘	Oh; Ow; Aw	Fù	Foo	Ū	Wu; Foo	Wu	Woo	Jpn.	Ko
15	胡		Hú	Hu^{2}	Wu	Woo, Vu	Ô͘	Oh; Ow; Aw	Fù	Foo	Ū	Wu; Foo	Wu	Woo	Phil.	Hu, Ho
16	郭		Guō	Kuo^{1}	Kwok	Kuok	Koeh (Z, K, T); Keh (X); Kerh (Q)	Kueh; Koay; Quay; Kwek; Quek Kwik	Kwok	Kwok; Kok	Kuok	Kwok	Koh	Goh; Kueh; Koq	Viet.	Quách
16	郭		Guō	Kuo^{1}	Kwok	Kuok	Koeh (Z, K, T); Keh (X); Kerh (Q)	Kueh; Koay; Quay; Kwek; Quek Kwik	Kwok	Kwok; Kok	Kuok	Kwok	Koh	Goh; Kueh; Koq	Kor.	Gwak (곽)
16	郭		Guō	Kuo^{1}	Kwok	Kuok	Koeh (Z, K, T); Keh (X); Kerh (Q)	Kueh; Koay; Quay; Kwek; Quek Kwik	Kwok	Kwok; Kok	Kuok	Kwok	Koh	Goh; Kueh; Koq	Jpn.	Kaku
16	郭		Guō	Kuo^{1}	Kwok	Kuok	Koeh (Z, K, T); Keh (X); Kerh (Q)	Kueh; Koay; Quay; Kwek; Quek Kwik	Kwok	Kwok; Kok	Kuok	Kwok	Koh	Goh; Kueh; Koq	Phil.	Que, Cue, Kwok, Guo
17	何		Hé	Hê^{2} Ho^{2}	Ho	Hoe	Hô	Ho; Hor; Hou	Hò	Ho	Hó	Ho	Wu	Woo	Viet.	Hà
17	何		Hé	Hê^{2} Ho^{2}	Ho	Hoe	Hô	Ho; Hor; Hou	Hò	Ho	Hó	Ho	Wu	Woo	Kor.	Ha (하)
17	何		Hé	Hê^{2} Ho^{2}	Ho	Hoe	Hô	Ho; Hor; Hou	Hò	Ho	Hó	Ho	Wu	Woo	Phil.	Ho
17	何		Hé	Hê^{2} Ho^{2}	Ho	Hoe	Hô	Ho; Hor; Hou	Hò	Ho	Hó	Ho	Wu	Woo	Jpn.	Ka
18	林		Lín	Lin^{2}	Lam	Lum	Lîm	Lim	Lìm	Lim	Līm	Līm	Lin	Ling	Viet.	Lâm
18	林		Lín	Lin^{2}	Lam	Lum	Lîm	Lim	Lìm	Lim	Līm	Līm	Lin	Ling	Kor.	Lim/Im/Rim (임/림)
18	林		Lín	Lin^{2}	Lam	Lum	Lîm	Lim	Lìm	Lim	Līm	Līm	Lin	Ling	Phil.	Lim
18	林		Lín	Lin^{2}	Lam	Lum	Lîm	Lim	Lìm	Lim	Līm	Līm	Lin	Ling	Jpn.	Rin/Hayashi
19	高		Gāo	Kao^{1}	Ko	Kou; Go	Ko (X, Z, K, T); Ko͘ (Q)	Ko; Kor	Kô; Kau	Koo	Kou	Kou	Kau	Ko; Gau	Viet.	Cao
19	高		Gāo	Kao^{1}	Ko	Kou; Go	Ko (X, Z, K, T); Ko͘ (Q)	Ko; Kor	Kô; Kau	Koo	Kou	Kou	Kau	Ko; Gau	Kor.	Go (고)
19	高		Gāo	Kao^{1}	Ko	Kou; Go	Ko (X, Z, K, T); Ko͘ (Q)	Ko; Kor	Kô; Kau	Koo	Kou	Kou	Kau	Ko; Gau	Jpn.	Kō
19	高		Gāo	Kao^{1}	Ko	Kou; Go	Ko (X, Z, K, T); Ko͘ (Q)	Ko; Kor	Kô; Kau	Koo	Kou	Kou	Kau	Ko; Gau	Phil.	Caw, Co, Ko, Gao
20	羅	罗	Luó	Lo^{2}	Lo	Law; Loh, Lowe; Lor	Lô	Lo; Lor; Law	Lò	Law; Lo; Loh	Lō	Lō; Law	Lu	Loo	Viet.	La
20	羅	罗	Luó	Lo^{2}	Lo	Law; Loh, Lowe; Lor	Lô	Lo; Lor; Law	Lò	Law; Lo; Loh	Lō	Lō; Law	Lu	Loo	Kor.	Na/La/Ra (나/라)
20	羅	罗	Luó	Lo^{2}	Lo	Law; Loh, Lowe; Lor	Lô	Lo; Lor; Law	Lò	Law; Lo; Loh	Lō	Lō; Law	Lu	Loo	Phil.	Lo
20	羅	罗	Luó	Lo^{2}	Lo	Law; Loh, Lowe; Lor	Lô	Lo; Lor; Law	Lò	Law; Lo; Loh	Lō	Lō; Law	Lu	Loo	Jpn.	Ra
21	鄭	郑	Zhèng	Cheng^{4}	Cheng	Cheang; Chiang	Tēⁿ (K); Tīⁿ (X, T); Tìⁿ (Q); Tēeⁿ (Z)	Tay; Teh; Tey	Chhang	Chang	Thàng		Zen	Zung	Viet.	Trịnh
21	鄭	郑	Zhèng	Cheng^{4}	Cheng	Cheang; Chiang	Tēⁿ (K); Tīⁿ (X, T); Tìⁿ (Q); Tēeⁿ (Z)	Tay; Teh; Tey	Chhang	Chang	Thàng		Zen	Zung	Kor.	Jeong (정)
21	鄭	郑	Zhèng	Cheng^{4}	Cheng	Cheang; Chiang	Tēⁿ (K); Tīⁿ (X, T); Tìⁿ (Q); Tēeⁿ (Z)	Tay; Teh; Tey	Chhang	Chang	Thàng		Zen	Zung	Jpn.	Tei
21	鄭	郑	Zhèng	Cheng^{4}	Cheng	Cheang; Chiang	Tēⁿ (K); Tīⁿ (X, T); Tìⁿ (Q); Tēeⁿ (Z)	Tay; Teh; Tey	Chhang	Chang	Thàng		Zen	Zung	Phil.	Ty, Tee, Cheng, Chiang
22	梁		Liáng	Liang^{2}	Leung	Leong; Lang; Leng	Niû (X, Q, K, T); Niô͘ (Z)	Neo	Liòng	Leong	Liōng		Lian		Viet.	Lương
22	梁		Liáng	Liang^{2}	Leung	Leong; Lang; Leng	Niû (X, Q, K, T); Niô͘ (Z)	Neo	Liòng	Leong	Liōng		Lian		Kor.	Yang/Ryang (양/량)
22	梁		Liáng	Liang^{2}	Leung	Leong; Lang; Leng	Niû (X, Q, K, T); Niô͘ (Z)	Neo	Liòng	Leong	Liōng		Lian		Phil.	Leong, Liong, Leung, Niu
22	梁		Liáng	Liang^{2}	Leung	Leong; Lang; Leng	Niû (X, Q, K, T); Niô͘ (Z)	Neo	Liòng	Leong	Liōng		Lian		Jpn.	Ryō
23	謝	谢	Xiè	Hsieh^{4}	Tse	Che	Chiā (Z, K); Siā (X, T); Sià (Q)	Chia; Cheah; Seah	Tshia	Cheah	Chhià		Zia		Viet.	Tạ
23	謝	谢	Xiè	Hsieh^{4}	Tse	Che	Chiā (Z, K); Siā (X, T); Sià (Q)	Chia; Cheah; Seah	Tshia	Cheah	Chhià		Zia		Kor.	Sa (사)
23	謝	谢	Xiè	Hsieh^{4}	Tse	Che	Chiā (Z, K); Siā (X, T); Sià (Q)	Chia; Cheah; Seah	Tshia	Cheah	Chhià		Zia		Jpn.	Sha
23	謝	谢	Xiè	Hsieh^{4}	Tse	Che	Chiā (Z, K); Siā (X, T); Sià (Q)	Chia; Cheah; Seah	Tshia	Cheah	Chhià		Zia		Can.	Tsia
23	謝	谢	Xiè	Hsieh^{4}	Tse	Che	Chiā (Z, K); Siā (X, T); Sià (Q)	Chia; Cheah; Seah	Tshia	Cheah	Chhià		Zia		Phil.	Sia, Saa, Sese, Chia, Tse
23	謝	谢	Xiè	Hsieh^{4}	Tse	Che	Chiā (Z, K); Siā (X, T); Sià (Q)	Chia; Cheah; Seah	Tshia	Cheah	Chhià		Zia		Misc.	Shie
24	宋		Sòng	Sung^{4}	Sung		Sòng; Sàng (K, T)	Song	Sung	Song; Soong	Sūng		Son	Sung; Soong	Viet.	Tống
24	宋		Sòng	Sung^{4}	Sung		Sòng; Sàng (K, T)	Song	Sung	Song; Soong	Sūng		Son	Sung; Soong	Kor.	Song (송)
24	宋		Sòng	Sung^{4}	Sung		Sòng; Sàng (K, T)	Song	Sung	Song; Soong	Sūng		Son	Sung; Soong	Jpn.	Sō
24	宋		Sòng	Sung^{4}	Sung		Sòng; Sàng (K, T)	Song	Sung	Song; Soong	Sūng		Son	Sung; Soong	Phil.	Song, Songco, Soong, Sung
24	宋		Sòng	Sung^{4}	Sung		Sòng; Sàng (K, T)	Song	Sung	Song; Soong	Sūng		Son	Sung; Soong	Misc.	Soong
25	唐		Táng	T'ang^{2}	Tong		Tn̂g; Tông (X, Z, K, T)	Tng; Tang	Thòng	Tong; Thong	Thóng		Daon	Daan	Viet.	Đường
25	唐		Táng	T'ang^{2}	Tong		Tn̂g; Tông (X, Z, K, T)	Tng; Tang	Thòng	Tong; Thong	Thóng		Daon	Daan	Kor.	Dang (당)
25	唐		Táng	T'ang^{2}	Tong		Tn̂g; Tông (X, Z, K, T)	Tng; Tang	Thòng	Tong; Thong	Thóng		Daon	Daan	Phil.	Teng
25	唐		Táng	T'ang^{2}	Tong		Tn̂g; Tông (X, Z, K, T)	Tng; Tang	Thòng	Tong; Thong	Thóng		Daon	Daan	Jpn.	Tō
26	許	许	Xǔ	Hsü^{3}	Hui	Hoi	Khó͘	Koh; Khoh; Ko	Hí	Hee	Hé		Siu	Syu; Shiu	Viet.	Hái, Hứa
26	許	许	Xǔ	Hsü^{3}	Hui	Hoi	Khó͘	Koh; Khoh; Ko	Hí	Hee	Hé		Siu	Syu; Shiu	Kor.	Heo (허)
26	許	许	Xǔ	Hsü^{3}	Hui	Hoi	Khó͘	Koh; Khoh; Ko	Hí	Hee	Hé		Siu	Syu; Shiu	Jpn.	Kyo
26	許	许	Xǔ	Hsü^{3}	Hui	Hoi	Khó͘	Koh; Khoh; Ko	Hí	Hee	Hé		Siu	Syu; Shiu	Phil.	Kho, Ko, Co, Kaw, Cojuangco
27	鄧	邓	Dèng	Teng^{2}	Tang	Theng	Tēng (X, Z, K, T); Tèng (Q)	Teng	Then	Then Thien	Then	Thèn		Den	Viet.	Đặng
27	鄧	邓	Dèng	Teng^{2}	Tang	Theng	Tēng (X, Z, K, T); Tèng (Q)	Teng	Then	Then Thien	Then	Thèn		Den	Kor.	Deung (등)
27	鄧	邓	Dèng	Teng^{2}	Tang	Theng	Tēng (X, Z, K, T); Tèng (Q)	Teng	Then	Then Thien	Then	Thèn		Den	Jpn.	Tō
27	鄧	邓	Dèng	Teng^{2}	Tang	Theng	Tēng (X, Z, K, T); Tèng (Q)	Teng	Then	Then Thien	Then	Thèn		Den	Phil.	Teng, Tengco, Tangco
28	韓	韩	Hán	Han^{2}	Hon		Hân	Hang; Han	Hòn	Hon	Hón		Ghoe	Reu	Viet.	Hàn
28	韓	韩	Hán	Han^{2}	Hon		Hân	Hang; Han	Hòn	Hon	Hón		Ghoe	Reu	Kor.	Han (한)
28	韓	韩	Hán	Han^{2}	Hon		Hân	Hang; Han	Hòn	Hon	Hón		Ghoe	Reu	Jpn.	Kan
28	韓	韩	Hán	Han^{2}	Hon		Hân	Hang; Han	Hòn	Hon	Hón		Ghoe	Reu	Misc.	Hang
29	馮	冯	Féng	Feng^{2}	Fung	Fong	Pâng	Pang	Fùng; Phùng	Foong	Fūng		Von	Vong	Viet.	Phùng
29	馮	冯	Féng	Feng^{2}	Fung	Fong	Pâng	Pang	Fùng; Phùng	Foong	Fūng		Von	Vong	Kor.	Pung (풍)
29	馮	冯	Féng	Feng^{2}	Fung	Fong	Pâng	Pang	Fùng; Phùng	Foong	Fūng		Von	Vong	Jpn.	Hō
29	馮	冯	Féng	Feng^{2}	Fung	Fong	Pâng	Pang	Fùng; Phùng	Foong	Fūng		Von	Vong	Phil.	Fung, Pangco, Pang
30	曹		Cáo	Ts'ao^{2}	Cho; Tso	Chaw	Chô (X, Z, K, T); Chô͘ (Q)	Chow	Tshò; Tshàu	Cho; Chaw	Chhóu		Zau	Zo	Viet.	Tào
30	曹		Cáo	Ts'ao^{2}	Cho; Tso	Chaw	Chô (X, Z, K, T); Chô͘ (Q)	Chow	Tshò; Tshàu	Cho; Chaw	Chhóu		Zau	Zo	Kor.	Jo (조)
30	曹		Cáo	Ts'ao^{2}	Cho; Tso	Chaw	Chô (X, Z, K, T); Chô͘ (Q)	Chow	Tshò; Tshàu	Cho; Chaw	Chhóu		Zau	Zo	Jpn.	Sō
31	彭		Péng	P'eng^{2}	Pang	Banh	Phêⁿ (K); Phîⁿ (X, Q, T); Phêeⁿ (Z)	Peh; Phe	Phàng	Phang	Pháng		Ban		Viet.	Bành
31	彭		Péng	P'eng^{2}	Pang	Banh	Phêⁿ (K); Phîⁿ (X, Q, T); Phêeⁿ (Z)	Peh; Phe	Phàng	Phang	Pháng		Ban		Kor.	Paeng (팽)
31	彭		Péng	P'eng^{2}	Pang	Banh	Phêⁿ (K); Phîⁿ (X, Q, T); Phêeⁿ (Z)	Peh; Phe	Phàng	Phang	Pháng		Ban		Jpn.	Hō
31	彭		Péng	P'eng^{2}	Pang	Banh	Phêⁿ (K); Phîⁿ (X, Q, T); Phêeⁿ (Z)	Peh; Phe	Phàng	Phang	Pháng		Ban		Khmer	Pay
32	曾		Zēng	Tseng^{1}	Tsang	Chang; Dong	Chan	Chan	Tsên	Chen	Chen		Tsen	Tzen; Tsung	Viet.	Tăng
32	曾		Zēng	Tseng^{1}	Tsang	Chang; Dong	Chan	Chan	Tsên	Chen	Chen		Tsen	Tzen; Tsung	Kor.	Jeung (증)
32	曾		Zēng	Tseng^{1}	Tsang	Chang; Dong	Chan	Chan	Tsên	Chen	Chen		Tsen	Tzen; Tsung	Jpn.	Sō
32	曾		Zēng	Tseng^{1}	Tsang	Chang; Dong	Chan	Chan	Tsên	Chen	Chen		Tsen	Tzen; Tsung	Idn.	Tjan
32	曾		Zēng	Tseng^{1}	Tsang	Chang; Dong	Chan	Chan	Tsên	Chen	Chen		Tsen	Tzen; Tsung	Phil.	Chan, Chang
32	曾		Zēng	Tseng^{1}	Tsang	Chang; Dong	Chan	Chan	Tsên	Chen	Chen		Tsen	Tzen; Tsung	Misc.	Tzeng
33	蕭	萧	Xiāo	Hsiao^{1}	Siu; Shiu	Sio	Siau (X, Z, K, T); Sio (X, Q, K, T)	Seow; Siau; Siow	Siâu	Siew; Siaw	Sieu		Siau	Shio	Viet.	Tiêu
33	蕭	萧	Xiāo	Hsiao^{1}	Siu; Shiu	Sio	Siau (X, Z, K, T); Sio (X, Q, K, T)	Seow; Siau; Siow	Siâu	Siew; Siaw	Sieu		Siau	Shio	Kor.	So (소)
33	蕭	萧	Xiāo	Hsiao^{1}	Siu; Shiu	Sio	Siau (X, Z, K, T); Sio (X, Q, K, T)	Seow; Siau; Siow	Siâu	Siew; Siaw	Sieu		Siau	Shio	Phil.	Siao, Syaw, Shau, Shao, Shaw
33	蕭	萧	Xiāo	Hsiao^{1}	Siu; Shiu	Sio	Siau (X, Z, K, T); Sio (X, Q, K, T)	Seow; Siau; Siow	Siâu	Siew; Siaw	Sieu		Siau	Shio	Jpn.	Shō
34	田		Tián	T'ien^{2}	Tin	Chan	Tiân	Chan; Chang	Thièn	Thien; Then	Thién		Di	Dee	Viet.	Điền
34	田		Tián	T'ien^{2}	Tin	Chan	Tiân	Chan; Chang	Thièn	Thien; Then	Thién		Di	Dee	Kor.	Jeon (전)
34	田		Tián	T'ien^{2}	Tin	Chan	Tiân	Chan; Chang	Thièn	Thien; Then	Thién		Di	Dee	Phil.	Tian, Tien
34	田		Tián	T'ien^{2}	Tin	Chan	Tiân	Chan; Chang	Thièn	Thien; Then	Thién		Di	Dee	Jpn.	Ten
35	董		Dǒng	Tung^{3}	Tung	Tong	Táng; Tóng (Z)	Tong	Túng	Tung	Tûng		Ton	Tung; Toong	Viet.	Đổng
35	董		Dǒng	Tung^{3}	Tung	Tong	Táng; Tóng (Z)	Tong	Túng	Tung	Tûng		Ton	Tung; Toong	Kor.	Dong (동)
35	董		Dǒng	Tung^{3}	Tung	Tong	Táng; Tóng (Z)	Tong	Túng	Tung	Tûng		Ton	Tung; Toong	Phil.	Tong, Tung
35	董		Dǒng	Tung^{3}	Tung	Tong	Táng; Tóng (Z)	Tong	Túng	Tung	Tûng		Ton	Tung; Toong	Jpn.	Tō
36	潘		Pān	P'an^{1}	Poon; Pun	Pun	Phoaⁿ	Phua	Phân	Pan; Phan	Phon		Phoe	Poe	Viet.	Phan
36	潘		Pān	P'an^{1}	Poon; Pun	Pun	Phoaⁿ	Phua	Phân	Pan; Phan	Phon		Phoe	Poe	Kor.	Ban (반)
36	潘		Pān	P'an^{1}	Poon; Pun	Pun	Phoaⁿ	Phua	Phân	Pan; Phan	Phon		Phoe	Poe	Jpn.	Han
36	潘		Pān	P'an^{1}	Poon; Pun	Pun	Phoaⁿ	Phua	Phân	Pan; Phan	Phon		Phoe	Poe	Phil.	Pua, Pan, Poon
37	袁		Yuán	Yüan^{2}	Yuen	Wan	Oân	Wang	Yèn	Yen	Iōn		Yoe	Yoo; Yeu	Viet.	Viên
37	袁		Yuán	Yüan^{2}	Yuen	Wan	Oân	Wang	Yèn	Yen	Iōn		Yoe	Yoo; Yeu	Kor.	Won (원)
37	袁		Yuán	Yüan^{2}	Yuen	Wan	Oân	Wang	Yèn	Yen	Iōn		Yoe	Yoo; Yeu	Jpn.	En
37	袁		Yuán	Yüan^{2}	Yuen	Wan	Oân	Wang	Yèn	Yen	Iōn		Yoe	Yoo; Yeu	Phil.	Yan
38	蔡		Cài	Ts'ai^{4}	Choi	Choy; Tsoi; Toy	Chhoà	Chua	Chhai	Chai; Choi	Chhói		Tsa		Viet.	Thái; Sái
38	蔡		Cài	Ts'ai^{4}	Choi	Choy; Tsoi; Toy	Chhoà	Chua	Chhai	Chai; Choi	Chhói		Tsa		Kor.	Chae (채)
38	蔡		Cài	Ts'ai^{4}	Choi	Choy; Tsoi; Toy	Chhoà	Chua	Chhai	Chai; Choi	Chhói		Tsa		Jpn.	Sai
38	蔡		Cài	Ts'ai^{4}	Choi	Choy; Tsoi; Toy	Chhoà	Chua	Chhai	Chai; Choi	Chhói		Tsa		Can.	Chai
38	蔡		Cài	Ts'ai^{4}	Choi	Choy; Tsoi; Toy	Chhoà	Chua	Chhai	Chai; Choi	Chhói		Tsa		Phil.	Chua, Choa, Choi, Cai, Tsai
38	蔡		Cài	Ts'ai^{4}	Choi	Choy; Tsoi; Toy	Chhoà	Chua	Chhai	Chai; Choi	Chhói		Tsa		Misc.	Tsay
39	蔣	蒋	Jiǎng	Chiang^{3}	Tseung	Cheung	Chiúⁿ (X, Q, K, T); Chióⁿ (Z)	Cheoh; Chioh	Tsiòng	Cheong	Chiông		Cian	Jian	Viet.	Tưởng
39	蔣	蒋	Jiǎng	Chiang^{3}	Tseung	Cheung	Chiúⁿ (X, Q, K, T); Chióⁿ (Z)	Cheoh; Chioh	Tsiòng	Cheong	Chiông		Cian	Jian	Kor.	Jang (장)
39	蔣	蒋	Jiǎng	Chiang^{3}	Tseung	Cheung	Chiúⁿ (X, Q, K, T); Chióⁿ (Z)	Cheoh; Chioh	Tsiòng	Cheong	Chiông		Cian	Jian	Jpn.	Shō
39	蔣	蒋	Jiǎng	Chiang^{3}	Tseung	Cheung	Chiúⁿ (X, Q, K, T); Chióⁿ (Z)	Cheoh; Chioh	Tsiòng	Cheong	Chiông		Cian	Jian	Phil.	Chio, Chiu, Chung
40	余		Yú	Yü^{2}	Yu; Yue	U Yee	Î (Z, K, T); Û (X, K, T); Îr (Q)	Ee; Eu	Yì	Yee	Uī		Yu		Viet.	Dư
40	余		Yú	Yü^{2}	Yu; Yue	U Yee	Î (Z, K, T); Û (X, K, T); Îr (Q)	Ee; Eu	Yì	Yee	Uī		Yu		Kor.	Yeo (여)
40	余		Yú	Yü^{2}	Yu; Yue	U Yee	Î (Z, K, T); Û (X, K, T); Îr (Q)	Ee; Eu	Yì	Yee	Uī		Yu		Jpn.	Yo
40	余		Yú	Yü^{2}	Yu; Yue	U Yee	Î (Z, K, T); Û (X, K, T); Îr (Q)	Ee; Eu	Yì	Yee	Uī		Yu		Idn.	Ie, Iman, Oe
40	余		Yú	Yü^{2}	Yu; Yue	U Yee	Î (Z, K, T); Û (X, K, T); Îr (Q)	Ee; Eu	Yì	Yee	Uī		Yu		Phil.	Yee, Yu
41	于		Yú	Yü^{2}	Yue	U	Î (Z); Û (X); U (Q, K, T)	Yee	Yî	Yee	Uī		Iu	Ü Yu	Viet.	Vu
41	于		Yú	Yü^{2}	Yue	U	Î (Z); Û (X); U (Q, K, T)	Yee	Yî	Yee	Uī		Iu	Ü Yu	Kor.	U (우)
41	于		Yú	Yü^{2}	Yue	U	Î (Z); Û (X); U (Q, K, T)	Yee	Yî	Yee	Uī		Iu	Ü Yu	Jpn.	U
42	杜		Dù	Tu^{4}	To	Do; Tou	Tō͘ (X, Z, K, T); Tǒ͘ (Q)	Toh	Thu	To; Toh	Thù		Du		Viet.	Đỗ
42	杜		Dù	Tu^{4}	To	Do; Tou	Tō͘ (X, Z, K, T); Tǒ͘ (Q)	Toh	Thu	To; Toh	Thù		Du		Kor.	Du (두)
42	杜		Dù	Tu^{4}	To	Do; Tou	Tō͘ (X, Z, K, T); Tǒ͘ (Q)	Toh	Thu	To; Toh	Thù		Du		Jpn.	To
42	杜		Dù	Tu^{4}	To	Do; Tou	Tō͘ (X, Z, K, T); Tǒ͘ (Q)	Toh	Thu	To; Toh	Thù		Du		Phil.	To
43	葉	叶	Yè	Yeh^{4}	Yip	Ip; Yeap	Ia̍p	Yap	Ya̍p	Yap	Iep		Yih	Yiq	Viet.	Diệp
43	葉	叶	Yè	Yeh^{4}	Yip	Ip; Yeap	Ia̍p	Yap	Ya̍p	Yap	Iep		Yih	Yiq	Kor.	Seop/Yeop (섭/엽)
43	葉	叶	Yè	Yeh^{4}	Yip	Ip; Yeap	Ia̍p	Yap	Ya̍p	Yap	Iep		Yih	Yiq	Jpn.	Yō
43	葉	叶	Yè	Yeh^{4}	Yip	Ip; Yeap	Ia̍p	Yap	Ya̍p	Yap	Iep		Yih	Yiq	Phil.	Yap, Ip
43	葉	叶	Yè	Yeh^{4}	Yip	Ip; Yeap	Ia̍p	Yap	Ya̍p	Yap	Iep		Yih	Yiq	Misc.	Yee, Ee
44	程		Chéng	Ch'eng^{2}	Ching	Cheng	Thiâⁿ (X, Q, K, T); Thêeⁿ (Z)	Thia	Chhàng; Chhìn	Chang; Chin	Tháng		Zen	Zung	Viet.	Trình
44	程		Chéng	Ch'eng^{2}	Ching	Cheng	Thiâⁿ (X, Q, K, T); Thêeⁿ (Z)	Thia	Chhàng; Chhìn	Chang; Chin	Tháng		Zen	Zung	Kor.	Jeong (정)
44	程		Chéng	Ch'eng^{2}	Ching	Cheng	Thiâⁿ (X, Q, K, T); Thêeⁿ (Z)	Thia	Chhàng; Chhìn	Chang; Chin	Tháng		Zen	Zung	Jpn.	Tei
45	魏		Wèi	Wei^{4}	Ngai		Gūi (X, Z, K, T); Gùi (Q)	Ngwee; Ngui	Ngui	Ngui; Wee	Ngùi		Ngue; We	Wae	Viet.	Nguỵ; Ngụy
45	魏		Wèi	Wei^{4}	Ngai		Gūi (X, Z, K, T); Gùi (Q)	Ngwee; Ngui	Ngui	Ngui; Wee	Ngùi		Ngue; We	Wae	Kor.	Wi (위)
45	魏		Wèi	Wei^{4}	Ngai		Gūi (X, Z, K, T); Gùi (Q)	Ngwee; Ngui	Ngui	Ngui; Wee	Ngùi		Ngue; We	Wae	Jpn.	Gi
45	魏		Wèi	Wei^{4}	Ngai		Gūi (X, Z, K, T); Gùi (Q)	Ngwee; Ngui	Ngui	Ngui; Wee	Ngùi		Ngue; We	Wae	Phil.	Wee
46	蘇	苏	Sū	Su^{1}	So	Sou	So͘	Soh	Sû	Soo	Su		Su	Soo	Viet.	Tô
46	蘇	苏	Sū	Su^{1}	So	Sou	So͘	Soh	Sû	Soo	Su		Su	Soo	Kor.	So (소)
46	蘇	苏	Sū	Su^{1}	So	Sou	So͘	Soh	Sû	Soo	Su		Su	Soo	Jpn.	So
46	蘇	苏	Sū	Su^{1}	So	Sou	So͘	Soh	Sû	Soo	Su		Su	Soo	Phil.	So, Solon
46	蘇	苏	Sū	Su^{1}	So	Sou	So͘	Soh	Sû	Soo	Su		Su	Soo	Misc.	Soo
47	呂	吕	Lǚ	Lü^{3}	Lui	Loi	Lū (X, T); Lī (Z, K); Lǐr (Q)	Lee; Leu; Ler; Loo	Lî	Lee	Liê		Li	Lee	Viet.	Lữ; Lã
47	呂	吕	Lǚ	Lü^{3}	Lui	Loi	Lū (X, T); Lī (Z, K); Lǐr (Q)	Lee; Leu; Ler; Loo	Lî	Lee	Liê		Li	Lee	Kor.	Yeo/Ryeo (여/려)
47	呂	吕	Lǚ	Lü^{3}	Lui	Loi	Lū (X, T); Lī (Z, K); Lǐr (Q)	Lee; Leu; Ler; Loo	Lî	Lee	Liê		Li	Lee	Jpn.	Ryo
47	呂	吕	Lǚ	Lü^{3}	Lui	Loi	Lū (X, T); Lī (Z, K); Lǐr (Q)	Lee; Leu; Ler; Loo	Lî	Lee	Liê		Li	Lee	Phil.	Lu, Loo, Luy
48	丁		Dīng	Ting^{1}	Ting	Ding	Teng	Teng	Tén	Ten	Tiang		Tin		Viet.	Đinh
48	丁		Dīng	Ting^{1}	Ting	Ding	Teng	Teng	Tén	Ten	Tiang		Tin		Kor.	Jeong (정)
48	丁		Dīng	Ting^{1}	Ting	Ding	Teng	Teng	Tén	Ten	Tiang		Tin		Jpn.	Tei
48	丁		Dīng	Ting^{1}	Ting	Ding	Teng	Teng	Tén	Ten	Tiang		Tin		Phil.	Ting, Tin
49	任		Rén	Jen^{4}	Yam	Iam; Yum	Jîm (Z, K); Lîm (X, Q); Līm (T)	Jim	Ngim	Ngim; Yim	Nìm		Nin	Nying	Viet.	Nhiệm; Nhậm
49	任		Rén	Jen^{4}	Yam	Iam; Yum	Jîm (Z, K); Lîm (X, Q); Līm (T)	Jim	Ngim	Ngim; Yim	Nìm		Nin	Nying	Kor.	Im (임)
49	任		Rén	Jen^{4}	Yam	Iam; Yum	Jîm (Z, K); Lîm (X, Q); Līm (T)	Jim	Ngim	Ngim; Yim	Nìm		Nin	Nying	Jpn.	Jin
50	盧	卢	Lú	Lu^{2}	Lo	Lou	Lô͘	Loh	Lù	Loo	Lū		Lu		Viet.	Lư; Lô
50	盧	卢	Lú	Lu^{2}	Lo	Lou	Lô͘	Loh	Lù	Loo	Lū		Lu		Kor.	No/Ro (노/로)
50	盧	卢	Lú	Lu^{2}	Lo	Lou	Lô͘	Loh	Lù	Loo	Lū		Lu		Jpn.	Ro
51	姚		Yáo	Yao^{2}	Yiu	Yeow; Io; Iu	Iâu	Yeo	Yào	Yow	Iēu	Yau	Yau		Viet.	Diêu
51	姚		Yáo	Yao^{2}	Yiu	Yeow; Io; Iu	Iâu	Yeo	Yào	Yow	Iēu	Yau	Yau		Kor.	Yo (요)
51	姚		Yáo	Yao^{2}	Yiu	Yeow; Io; Iu	Iâu	Yeo	Yào	Yow	Iēu	Yau	Yau		Jpn.	Yō
51	姚		Yáo	Yao^{2}	Yiu	Yeow; Io; Iu	Iâu	Yeo	Yào	Yow	Iēu	Yau	Yau		Phil.	Yao
52	沈		Shěn	Shen^{3}	Shum; Sum; Sham	Sam; Shum	Sím	Sim	Shím; Sím	Sim	Sím		Sen	Sung	Viet.	Thẩm; Trầm
52	沈		Shěn	Shen^{3}	Shum; Sum; Sham	Sam; Shum	Sím	Sim	Shím; Sím	Sim	Sím		Sen	Sung	Kor.	Sim/Shim (심)
52	沈		Shěn	Shen^{3}	Shum; Sum; Sham	Sam; Shum	Sím	Sim	Shím; Sím	Sim	Sím		Sen	Sung	Jpn.	Shin
53	鍾	钟	Zhōng	Chung^{1}	Chung	Chong	Chiong; Cheng (K, T)	Cheng	Chûng; Tsung	Choong; Chung	Tung		Tson	Tzon; Tsung	Viet.	Chung
53	鍾	钟	Zhōng	Chung^{1}	Chung	Chong	Chiong; Cheng (K, T)	Cheng	Chûng; Tsung	Choong; Chung	Tung		Tson	Tzon; Tsung	Kor.	Jong (종)
53	鍾	钟	Zhōng	Chung^{1}	Chung	Chong	Chiong; Cheng (K, T)	Cheng	Chûng; Tsung	Choong; Chung	Tung		Tson	Tzon; Tsung	Jpn.	Shō
53	鍾	钟	Zhōng	Chung^{1}	Chung	Chong	Chiong; Cheng (K, T)	Cheng	Chûng; Tsung	Choong; Chung	Tung		Tson	Tzon; Tsung	Phil.	Chiong, Chong, Chung
54	姜		Jiāng	Chiang^{1}	Keung	Geung; Keong	Khiang (Z); Khiong (X, K, T); Khiuⁿ (Q)	Kiang	Kiông	Keong	Kiong		Cian	Jian	Viet.	Khương
54	姜		Jiāng	Chiang^{1}	Keung	Geung; Keong	Khiang (Z); Khiong (X, K, T); Khiuⁿ (Q)	Kiang	Kiông	Keong	Kiong		Cian	Jian	Kor.	Kang (강)
54	姜		Jiāng	Chiang^{1}	Keung	Geung; Keong	Khiang (Z); Khiong (X, K, T); Khiuⁿ (Q)	Kiang	Kiông	Keong	Kiong		Cian	Jian	Jpn.	Kyō
55	崔		Cuī	Ts'ui^{1}	Chui	Choi	Chhui	Chui; Chwee	Tshûi	Chooi	Chhoi		Tsoe	Tseu	Viet.	Thôi
55	崔		Cuī	Ts'ui^{1}	Chui	Choi	Chhui	Chui; Chwee	Tshûi	Chooi	Chhoi		Tsoe	Tseu	Kor.	Choi (최)
55	崔		Cuī	Ts'ui^{1}	Chui	Choi	Chhui	Chui; Chwee	Tshûi	Chooi	Chhoi		Tsoe	Tseu	Jpn.	Sai
55	崔		Cuī	Ts'ui^{1}	Chui	Choi	Chhui	Chui; Chwee	Tshûi	Chooi	Chhoi		Tsoe	Tseu	Misc.	Tseui
56	譚	谭	Tán	T'an^{2}	Tam	Tom; Ham; Hom	Thâm	Tham	Thàm	Tham	Thóm		De	Dae	Viet.	Đàm
56	譚	谭	Tán	T'an^{2}	Tam	Tom; Ham; Hom	Thâm	Tham	Thàm	Tham	Thóm		De	Dae	Kor.	Dam (담)
56	譚	谭	Tán	T'an^{2}	Tam	Tom; Ham; Hom	Thâm	Tham	Thàm	Tham	Thóm		De	Dae	Jpn.	Tan
56	譚	谭	Tán	T'an^{2}	Tam	Tom; Ham; Hom	Thâm	Tham	Thàm	Tham	Thóm		De	Dae	Phil.	Tam
57	陸	陆	Lù	Lu^{4}	Luk	Lok	Lio̍k	Loke; Lek	Liu̍k	Luk	Liuk		Loh	Loq	Viet.	Lục
57	陸	陆	Lù	Lu^{4}	Luk	Lok	Lio̍k	Loke; Lek	Liu̍k	Luk	Liuk		Loh	Loq	Kor.	Yuk/Ryuk (육/륙)
57	陸	陆	Lù	Lu^{4}	Luk	Lok	Lio̍k	Loke; Lek	Liu̍k	Luk	Liuk		Loh	Loq	Jpn.	Riku
57	陸	陆	Lù	Lu^{4}	Luk	Lok	Lio̍k	Loke; Lek	Liu̍k	Luk	Liuk		Loh	Loq	Phil.	Diokno
58	范		Fàn	Fan^{4}	Fan		Hoān (X, Z, K, T); Hoǎn (Q)Hwan	Huang; Hoan; Hwan	Fam	Fam; Hoan; Hwan	Fàn		Ve	Vae	Viet.	Phạm
58	范		Fàn	Fan^{4}	Fan		Hoān (X, Z, K, T); Hoǎn (Q)Hwan	Huang; Hoan; Hwan	Fam	Fam; Hoan; Hwan	Fàn		Ve	Vae	Kor.	Beom (범)
58	范		Fàn	Fan^{4}	Fan		Hoān (X, Z, K, T); Hoǎn (Q)Hwan	Huang; Hoan; Hwan	Fam	Fam; Hoan; Hwan	Fàn		Ve	Vae	Jpn.	Han
58	范		Fàn	Fan^{4}	Fan		Hoān (X, Z, K, T); Hoǎn (Q)Hwan	Huang; Hoan; Hwan	Fam	Fam; Hoan; Hwan	Fàn		Ve	Vae	Phil.	Juan, Hwan
59	汪		Wāng	Wang^{1}	Wong	Wung		Ong (X, Q, K, T); Óng (Z)	Wang	Vong	Wong	Uong	Waon	Whang	Viet.	Uông
59	汪		Wāng	Wang^{1}	Wong	Wung		Ong (X, Q, K, T); Óng (Z)	Wang	Vong	Wong	Uong	Waon	Whang	Kor.	Wang (왕)
59	汪		Wāng	Wang^{1}	Wong	Wung		Ong (X, Q, K, T); Óng (Z)	Wang	Vong	Wong	Uong	Waon	Whang	Jpn.	Ō
59	汪		Wāng	Wang^{1}	Wong	Wung		Ong (X, Q, K, T); Óng (Z)	Wang	Vong	Wong	Uong	Waon	Whang	Phil.	Ong, Ang
60	廖		Liào	Liao^{4}	Liu	Lew; Leow; Liew; Lio	Liāu (X, Z, K, T); Liàu (Q)	Leow; Liau; Liow	Liau	Liew; Liau	Lièu		Liau		Viet.	Liêu; Liệu
60	廖		Liào	Liao^{4}	Liu	Lew; Leow; Liew; Lio	Liāu (X, Z, K, T); Liàu (Q)	Leow; Liau; Liow	Liau	Liew; Liau	Lièu		Liau		Kor.	Ryo (료)
60	廖		Liào	Liao^{4}	Liu	Lew; Leow; Liew; Lio	Liāu (X, Z, K, T); Liàu (Q)	Leow; Liau; Liow	Liau	Liew; Liau	Lièu		Liau		Jpn.	Ryō
61	石		Shí	Shih^{2}	Shek	Sek; Seac; Seak	Chio̍h	Chioh; Cheoh	Sha̍k; Sak	Shak	Sak		Zah	Zaq	Viet.	Thạch
61	石		Shí	Shih^{2}	Shek	Sek; Seac; Seak	Chio̍h	Chioh; Cheoh	Sha̍k; Sak	Shak	Sak		Zah	Zaq	Kor.	Seok (석)
61	石		Shí	Shih^{2}	Shek	Sek; Seac; Seak	Chio̍h	Chioh; Cheoh	Sha̍k; Sak	Shak	Sak		Zah	Zaq	Jpn.	Seki
62	金		Jīn	Chin^{1}	Kam	Gum	Kim	Kim	Kîm	Kim	Kim		Cin	Jin	Viet.	Kim
62	金		Jīn	Chin^{1}	Kam	Gum	Kim	Kim	Kîm	Kim	Kim		Cin	Jin	Kor.	Kim (김)
62	金		Jīn	Chin^{1}	Kam	Gum	Kim	Kim	Kîm	Kim	Kim		Cin	Jin	Jpn.	Kin
63	韋	韦	Wéi	Wei^{2}	Wai	Vai	Ûi (X, Q, K, T); Úi (Z)	Wee	Vúi; Vì	Wooi; Wee	Uī		We		Viet.	Vi
63	韋	韦	Wéi	Wei^{2}	Wai	Vai	Ûi (X, Q, K, T); Úi (Z)	Wee	Vúi; Vì	Wooi; Wee	Uī		We		Kor.	Wi (위)
63	韋	韦	Wéi	Wei^{2}	Wai	Vai	Ûi (X, Q, K, T); Úi (Z)	Wee	Vúi; Vì	Wooi; Wee	Uī		We		Jpn.	I
63	韋	韦	Wéi	Wei^{2}	Wai	Vai	Ûi (X, Q, K, T); Úi (Z)	Wee	Vúi; Vì	Wooi; Wee	Uī		We		Phil.	Wee, Uy
64	賈	贾	Jiǎ	Chia^{3}	Ka	Ga	Ká (X, Q, K, T); Kée (Z)	Kia	Ká	Ka	Kâ		Cia	Jia	Viet.	Giả
64	賈	贾	Jiǎ	Chia^{3}	Ka	Ga	Ká (X, Q, K, T); Kée (Z)	Kia	Ká	Ka	Kâ		Cia	Jia	Kor.	Ga (가); Go (고)
64	賈	贾	Jiǎ	Chia^{3}	Ka	Ga	Ká (X, Q, K, T); Kée (Z)	Kia	Ká	Ka	Kâ		Cia	Jia	Jpn.	Ka
65	夏		Xià	Hsia^{2}	Ha		Hē (K, T); Hā (X, K, T); Hà (Q); Hēe (Z)	Hah; Hay	Ha	Ha	Hà		Gho	Ya; Wo	Viet.	Hạ
65	夏		Xià	Hsia^{2}	Ha		Hē (K, T); Hā (X, K, T); Hà (Q); Hēe (Z)	Hah; Hay	Ha	Ha	Hà		Gho	Ya; Wo	Kor.	Ha (하)
65	夏		Xià	Hsia^{2}	Ha		Hē (K, T); Hā (X, K, T); Hà (Q); Hēe (Z)	Hah; Hay	Ha	Ha	Hà		Gho	Ya; Wo	Jpn.	Ka
66	傅		Fù	Fu^{4}	Fu; Foo		Pò͘	Poh	Fu	Fu	Fù		Fu	Foo	Viet.	Phó
66	傅		Fù	Fu^{4}	Fu; Foo		Pò͘	Poh	Fu	Fu	Fù		Fu	Foo	Kor.	Bu (부)
66	傅		Fù	Fu^{4}	Fu; Foo		Pò͘	Poh	Fu	Fu	Fù		Fu	Foo	Jpn.	Fu
66	傅		Fù	Fu^{4}	Fu; Foo		Pò͘	Poh	Fu	Fu	Fù		Fu	Foo	Phil.	Po
67	方		Fāng	Fang^{1}	Fong		Hong (X, Q, K, T); Png (X, Q, K, T); Puiⁿ (Z)	Pung	Fông	Fong	Fong		Faon	Faan	Viet.	Phương
67	方		Fāng	Fang^{1}	Fong		Hong (X, Q, K, T); Png (X, Q, K, T); Puiⁿ (Z)	Pung	Fông	Fong	Fong		Faon	Faan	Kor.	Bang (방)
67	方		Fāng	Fang^{1}	Fong		Hong (X, Q, K, T); Png (X, Q, K, T); Puiⁿ (Z)	Pung	Fông	Fong	Fong		Faon	Faan	Jpn.	Hō
68	鄒	邹	Zōu	Tsou^{1}	Chau; Chow	Jao; Chau	Chau (K, T); Cho͘ (X, Z, K, T); Cho (Q); Che (Z)	Chou; Choh	Tsêu	Chew; Chiew	Chiu		Tseu	Tzeu	Viet.	Trâu
68	鄒	邹	Zōu	Tsou^{1}	Chau; Chow	Jao; Chau	Chau (K, T); Cho͘ (X, Z, K, T); Cho (Q); Che (Z)	Chou; Choh	Tsêu	Chew; Chiew	Chiu		Tseu	Tzeu	Kor.	Chu (추)
68	鄒	邹	Zōu	Tsou^{1}	Chau; Chow	Jao; Chau	Chau (K, T); Cho͘ (X, Z, K, T); Cho (Q); Che (Z)	Chou; Choh	Tsêu	Chew; Chiew	Chiu		Tseu	Tzeu	Jpn.	Shū
68	鄒	邹	Zōu	Tsou^{1}	Chau; Chow	Jao; Chau	Chau (K, T); Cho͘ (X, Z, K, T); Cho (Q); Che (Z)	Chou; Choh	Tsêu	Chew; Chiew	Chiu		Tseu	Tzeu	Phil.	Chou
69	熊		Xióng	Hsiung^{2}	Hung	Hong	Hîm	Him	Yùng	Yoong	Hiūng		Yon	Yoong	Viet.	Hùng
69	熊		Xióng	Hsiung^{2}	Hung	Hong	Hîm	Him	Yùng	Yoong	Hiūng		Yon	Yoong	Kor.	Ung (웅)
69	熊		Xióng	Hsiung^{2}	Hung	Hong	Hîm	Him	Yùng	Yoong	Hiūng		Yon	Yoong	Jpn.	Yū
69	熊		Xióng	Hsiung^{2}	Hung	Hong	Hîm	Him	Yùng	Yoong	Hiūng		Yon	Yoong	Phil.	Hung
70	白		Bái	Pai^{2}	Pak	Bahk	Pe̍h; Pe̍k (Z)	Peh	Pha̍k	Pak; Phak	Phak		Bah	Baq	Viet.	Bạch
70	白		Bái	Pai^{2}	Pak	Bahk	Pe̍h; Pe̍k (Z)	Peh	Pha̍k	Pak; Phak	Phak		Bah	Baq	Kor.	Baek (백)
70	白		Bái	Pai^{2}	Pak	Bahk	Pe̍h; Pe̍k (Z)	Peh	Pha̍k	Pak; Phak	Phak		Bah	Baq	Jpn.	Haku
70	白		Bái	Pai^{2}	Pak	Bahk	Pe̍h; Pe̍k (Z)	Peh	Pha̍k	Pak; Phak	Phak		Bah	Baq	Misc.	Bo
71	孟		Mèng	Meng^{4}	Mang		Bēng (X, Z, K, T); Bèng (Q)	Meng	Men	Mang	Màng		Man		Viet.	Mạnh
71	孟		Mèng	Meng^{4}	Mang		Bēng (X, Z, K, T); Bèng (Q)	Meng	Men	Mang	Màng		Man		Kor.	Maeng (맹)
71	孟		Mèng	Meng^{4}	Mang		Bēng (X, Z, K, T); Bèng (Q)	Meng	Men	Mang	Màng		Man		Jpn.	Mō
72	秦		Qín	Ch'in^{2}	Chun	Tseun; Tseon; Chon	Chîn	Ching	Tshìn	Chin	Chhín		Zhin	Zin	Viet.	Tần
72	秦		Qín	Ch'in^{2}	Chun	Tseun; Tseon; Chon	Chîn	Ching	Tshìn	Chin	Chhín		Zhin	Zin	Kor.	Jin (진)
72	秦		Qín	Ch'in^{2}	Chun	Tseun; Tseon; Chon	Chîn	Ching	Tshìn	Chin	Chhín		Zhin	Zin	Jpn.	Shin
72	秦		Qín	Ch'in^{2}	Chun	Tseun; Tseon; Chon	Chîn	Ching	Tshìn	Chin	Chhín		Zhin	Zin	Phil.	Ching
73	邱		Qiū^{1}	Ch'iu^{1}	Yau	Iao; Iau	Khu	Khoo; Kho	Khiû; Hiû	Hew; Khew	Khiu		Chieu		Viet.	Khâu
73	邱		Qiū^{1}	Ch'iu^{1}	Yau	Iao; Iau	Khu	Khoo; Kho	Khiû; Hiû	Hew; Khew	Khiu		Chieu		Kor.	Gu (구)
73	邱		Qiū^{1}	Ch'iu^{1}	Yau	Iao; Iau	Khu	Khoo; Kho	Khiû; Hiû	Hew; Khew	Khiu		Chieu		Jpn.	Kyū
73	邱		Qiū^{1}	Ch'iu^{1}	Yau	Iao; Iau	Khu	Khoo; Kho	Khiû; Hiû	Hew; Khew	Khiu		Chieu		Mal.	Hew, Hiew; Chiew
73	邱		Qiū^{1}	Ch'iu^{1}	Yau	Iao; Iau	Khu	Khoo; Kho	Khiû; Hiû	Hew; Khew	Khiu		Chieu		Phil.	Coo, Khoo
73	邱		Qiū^{1}	Ch'iu^{1}	Yau	Iao; Iau	Khu	Khoo; Kho	Khiû; Hiû	Hew; Khew	Khiu		Chieu		Misc.	Chiou
74	侯		Hóu	Hou^{2}	Hau	Hao	Hô͘ (X, Z); Hâu (Q, K, T); Kâu (X, Q, Z)	Hoh; Hau	Hèu	Hew	Héu		Gheu	Roe	Viet.	Hầu
74	侯		Hóu	Hou^{2}	Hau	Hao	Hô͘ (X, Z); Hâu (Q, K, T); Kâu (X, Q, Z)	Hoh; Hau	Hèu	Hew	Héu		Gheu	Roe	Kor.	Hu (후)
74	侯		Hóu	Hou^{2}	Hau	Hao	Hô͘ (X, Z); Hâu (Q, K, T); Kâu (X, Q, Z)	Hoh; Hau	Hèu	Hew	Héu		Gheu	Roe	Jpn.	Kō
74	侯		Hóu	Hou^{2}	Hau	Hao	Hô͘ (X, Z); Hâu (Q, K, T); Kâu (X, Q, Z)	Hoh; Hau	Hèu	Hew	Héu		Gheu	Roe	Phil.	Caw, Ho
75	江		Jiāng	Chiang^{1}	Kong		Kang	Kang	Kông	Kong	Kong		Kaon	Kang	Viet.	Giang
75	江		Jiāng	Chiang^{1}	Kong		Kang	Kang	Kông	Kong	Kong		Kaon	Kang	Kor.	Gang (강)
75	江		Jiāng	Chiang^{1}	Kong		Kang	Kang	Kông	Kong	Kong		Kaon	Kang	Jpn.	Kō
75	江		Jiāng	Chiang^{1}	Kong		Kang	Kang	Kông	Kong	Kong		Kaon	Kang	Phil.	Kang
75	江		Jiāng	Chiang^{1}	Kong		Kang	Kang	Kông	Kong	Kong		Kaon	Kang	Misc.	Kiang
76	尹		Yǐn	Yin^{3}	Wan		Ún (K, T); Ín (X, Q, Z)	Un; Eun; Eung	Yún	Yoon	Ín		Yin		Viet.	Doãn
76	尹		Yǐn	Yin^{3}	Wan		Ún (K, T); Ín (X, Q, Z)	Un; Eun; Eung	Yún	Yoon	Ín		Yin		Kor.	Yun (윤)
76	尹		Yǐn	Yin^{3}	Wan		Ún (K, T); Ín (X, Q, Z)	Un; Eun; Eung	Yún	Yoon	Ín		Yin		Jpn.	In
76	尹		Yǐn	Yin^{3}	Wan		Ún (K, T); Ín (X, Q, Z)	Un; Eun; Eung	Yún	Yoon	Ín		Yin		Phil.	Unson
77	薛		Xuē	Hsüeh^{1}	Sit		Sih		Siet	Set	Siot		Shih	Siq	Viet.	Tiết
77	薛		Xuē	Hsüeh^{1}	Sit		Sih		Siet	Set	Siot		Shih	Siq	Kor.	Seol (설)
77	薛		Xuē	Hsüeh^{1}	Sit		Sih		Siet	Set	Siot		Shih	Siq	Jpn.	Setsu
78	閻	阎	Yán	Yen^{2}	Yim	Im	Giâm	Ngiam	Ngiàm	Ngiam; Yam	Iēm		Ni	Gni; Nyi	Viet.	Diêm
78	閻	阎	Yán	Yen^{2}	Yim	Im	Giâm	Ngiam	Ngiàm	Ngiam; Yam	Iēm		Ni	Gni; Nyi	Kor.	Yeom (염)
78	閻	阎	Yán	Yen^{2}	Yim	Im	Giâm	Ngiam	Ngiàm	Ngiam; Yam	Iēm		Ni	Gni; Nyi	Jpn.	En
79	段		Duàn	Tuan^{4}	Tuen	Tun	Toān (X, Z, K, T); Toàn (Q)	Tng; Teung	Thon	Ton; Thon	Thòn		Doe	Deu	Viet.	Đoàn
79	段		Duàn	Tuan^{4}	Tuen	Tun	Toān (X, Z, K, T); Toàn (Q)	Tng; Teung	Thon	Ton; Thon	Thòn		Doe	Deu	Kor.	Dan (단)
79	段		Duàn	Tuan^{4}	Tuen	Tun	Toān (X, Z, K, T); Toàn (Q)	Tng; Teung	Thon	Ton; Thon	Thòn		Doe	Deu	Jpn.	Dan
80	雷		Léi	Lei^{2}	Lui	Loi	Lûi	Lui	Lùi	Looi; Lui	Lōi		Le	Lae; Lei	Viet.	Lôi
80	雷		Léi	Lei^{2}	Lui	Loi	Lûi	Lui	Lùi	Looi; Lui	Lōi		Le	Lae; Lei	Kor.	Roe (뢰); Noe (뇌)
80	雷		Léi	Lei^{2}	Lui	Loi	Lûi	Lui	Lùi	Looi; Lui	Lōi		Le	Lae; Lei	Jpn.	Rai
80	雷		Léi	Lei^{2}	Lui	Loi	Lûi	Lui	Lùi	Looi; Lui	Lōi		Le	Lae; Lei	Phil.	Lui, Luy
80	雷		Léi	Lei^{2}	Lui	Loi	Lûi	Lui	Lùi	Looi; Lui	Lōi		Le	Lae; Lei	Hoisan	Louie, Louis
81	龍	龙	Lóng	Lung^{2}	Lung; Loong	Long	Lêng (K, T); Liông	Leng; Liong	Liùng	Loong	Liūng		Lon	Lung	Viet.	Long
81	龍	龙	Lóng	Lung^{2}	Lung; Loong	Long	Lêng (K, T); Liông	Leng; Liong	Liùng	Loong	Liūng		Lon	Lung	Kor.	Yong/Ryong (용/룡)
81	龍	龙	Lóng	Lung^{2}	Lung; Loong	Long	Lêng (K, T); Liông	Leng; Liong	Liùng	Loong	Liūng		Lon	Lung	Jpn.	Ryō
81	龍	龙	Lóng	Lung^{2}	Lung; Loong	Long	Lêng (K, T); Liông	Leng; Liong	Liùng	Loong	Liūng		Lon	Lung	Phil.	Leong, Liong, Wee
82	黎		Lí	Li^{2}	Lai		Lê	Loy; Loi	Lì; Lài	Lee; Lai	Lī		Lí	Lee	Viet.	Lê
82	黎		Lí	Li^{2}	Lai		Lê	Loy; Loi	Lì; Lài	Lee; Lai	Lī		Lí	Lee	Kor.	Yeo/Ryeo (여/려)
82	黎		Lí	Li^{2}	Lai		Lê	Loy; Loi	Lì; Lài	Lee; Lai	Lī		Lí	Lee	Jpn.	Rei
83	史		Shǐ	Shih^{3}	Sze	Si	Sú (X, Z, K, T); Sái (X, Q); Sír (Q)	Ser; Seu; Sze	Sṳ́	Soo; Sze	Sî		Sy	Si	Viet.	Sử
83	史		Shǐ	Shih^{3}	Sze	Si	Sú (X, Z, K, T); Sái (X, Q); Sír (Q)	Ser; Seu; Sze	Sṳ́	Soo; Sze	Sî		Sy	Si	Kor.	Sa (사)
83	史		Shǐ	Shih^{3}	Sze	Si	Sú (X, Z, K, T); Sái (X, Q); Sír (Q)	Ser; Seu; Sze	Sṳ́	Soo; Sze	Sî		Sy	Si	Jpn.	Shi
83	史		Shǐ	Shih^{3}	Sze	Si	Sú (X, Z, K, T); Sái (X, Q); Sír (Q)	Ser; Seu; Sze	Sṳ́	Soo; Sze	Sî		Sy	Si	Phil.	Sze
84	陶		Táo	T'ao^{2}	To; Tao	Tow	Tô (X, Z, K, T); Tô͘ (Q); Thô (Q)	Tow	Thàu; Thò	Tao; Tow	Thóu		Dau	Do	Viet.	Đào
84	陶		Táo	T'ao^{2}	To; Tao	Tow	Tô (X, Z, K, T); Tô͘ (Q); Thô (Q)	Tow	Thàu; Thò	Tao; Tow	Thóu		Dau	Do	Kor.	Do (도)
84	陶		Táo	T'ao^{2}	To; Tao	Tow	Tô (X, Z, K, T); Tô͘ (Q); Thô (Q)	Tow	Thàu; Thò	Tao; Tow	Thóu		Dau	Do	Jpn.	Tō
84	陶		Táo	T'ao^{2}	To; Tao	Tow	Tô (X, Z, K, T); Tô͘ (Q); Thô (Q)	Tow	Thàu; Thò	Tao; Tow	Thóu		Dau	Do	Phil.	To
85	賀	贺	Hè	Hê^{4} Ho^{4}	Ho		Hō (X, Z, K, T); Hò (Q)	Hor	Ho; Fo	Ho	Hò		Wu	Woo	Viet.	Hạ
85	賀	贺	Hè	Hê^{4} Ho^{4}	Ho		Hō (X, Z, K, T); Hò (Q)	Hor	Ho; Fo	Ho	Hò		Wu	Woo	Kor.	Ha (하)
85	賀	贺	Hè	Hê^{4} Ho^{4}	Ho		Hō (X, Z, K, T); Hò (Q)	Hor	Ho; Fo	Ho	Hò		Wu	Woo	Jpn.	Ka
86	毛		Máo	Mao^{2}	Mo	Mou	Mô͘	Mor	Mô; Mâu	Mo; Mao	Mōu		Mau	Mo	Viet.	Mao
86	毛		Máo	Mao^{2}	Mo	Mou	Mô͘	Mor	Mô; Mâu	Mo; Mao	Mōu		Mau	Mo	Kor.	Mo (모)
86	毛		Máo	Mao^{2}	Mo	Mou	Mô͘	Mor	Mô; Mâu	Mo; Mao	Mōu		Mau	Mo	Jpn.	Bō
87	郝		Hǎo	Hao^{3}	Kok		Hok	Hak	Khok		Hok		Heh	Heq	Viet.	Hác
87	郝		Hǎo	Hao^{3}	Kok		Hok	Hak	Khok		Hok		Heh	Heq	Kor.	Hak (학)
87	郝		Hǎo	Hao^{3}	Kok		Hok	Hak	Khok		Hok		Heh	Heq	Jpn.	Kaku
88	顧	顾	Gù	Ku^{4}	Ku	Goo; Gu; Khoo	Kò͘	Koh	Ku	Koo	Kū	Go	Ku	Koo; Gu	Viet.	Cố
88	顧	顾	Gù	Ku^{4}	Ku	Goo; Gu; Khoo	Kò͘	Koh	Ku	Koo	Kū	Go	Ku	Koo; Gu	Kor.	Go (고)
88	顧	顾	Gù	Ku^{4}	Ku	Goo; Gu; Khoo	Kò͘	Koh	Ku	Koo	Kū	Go	Ku	Koo; Gu	Jpn.	Ko
88	顧	顾	Gù	Ku^{4}	Ku	Goo; Gu; Khoo	Kò͘	Koh	Ku	Koo	Kū	Go	Ku	Koo; Gu	Phil.	Coo, Khoo, Gu
89	龔	龚	Gōng	Kung^{1}	Kung	Kwong	Kéng (X, Q, K, T); Kiong (Z)		Kiûng	Kong	Kiung		Cion	Jiong; Jun	Viet.	Cung
89	龔	龚	Gōng	Kung^{1}	Kung	Kwong	Kéng (X, Q, K, T); Kiong (Z)		Kiûng	Kong	Kiung		Cion	Jiong; Jun	Kor.	Gong (공)
89	龔	龚	Gōng	Kung^{1}	Kung	Kwong	Kéng (X, Q, K, T); Kiong (Z)		Kiûng	Kong	Kiung		Cion	Jiong; Jun	Jpn.	Kyō
90	邵		Shào	Shao^{4}	Siu; Shiu	Shaw; Sio	Siō (X, K, T); Siāu (Z, K, T); Siàu (Q)	Seow; Sioh	Shau; Sau	Shao	Sèu		Zau	Zo	Viet.	Thiệu
90	邵		Shào	Shao^{4}	Siu; Shiu	Shaw; Sio	Siō (X, K, T); Siāu (Z, K, T); Siàu (Q)	Seow; Sioh	Shau; Sau	Shao	Sèu		Zau	Zo	Kor.	So (소)
90	邵		Shào	Shao^{4}	Siu; Shiu	Shaw; Sio	Siō (X, K, T); Siāu (Z, K, T); Siàu (Q)	Seow; Sioh	Shau; Sau	Shao	Sèu		Zau	Zo	Jpn.	Shō
90	邵		Shào	Shao^{4}	Siu; Shiu	Shaw; Sio	Siō (X, K, T); Siāu (Z, K, T); Siàu (Q)	Seow; Sioh	Shau; Sau	Shao	Sèu		Zau	Zo	Phil.	Siao, Syaw, Shau, Shao, Shaw
91	萬	万	Wàn	Wan^{4}	Man	Meng	Bān (X, Z, K, T); Bàn (Q)	Buang	Van	Wan; Man	Màn		Vae; Mae	Ve; Me	Viet.	Vạn
91	萬	万	Wàn	Wan^{4}	Man	Meng	Bān (X, Z, K, T); Bàn (Q)	Buang	Van	Wan; Man	Màn		Vae; Mae	Ve; Me	Kor.	Man (만)
91	萬	万	Wàn	Wan^{4}	Man	Meng	Bān (X, Z, K, T); Bàn (Q)	Buang	Van	Wan; Man	Màn		Vae; Mae	Ve; Me	Jpn.	Ban
91	萬	万	Wàn	Wan^{4}	Man	Meng	Bān (X, Z, K, T); Bàn (Q)	Buang	Van	Wan; Man	Màn		Vae; Mae	Ve; Me	Phil.	Man
92	覃		Tán / Qín	T'an^{2}	Tam		Thâm		Thàm		Thóm		Dae	De	Viet.	Tán
92	覃		Tán / Qín	T'an^{2}	Tam		Thâm		Thàm		Thóm		Dae	De	Kor.	Dam (담)
92	覃		Tán / Qín	T'an^{2}	Tam		Thâm		Thàm		Thóm		Dae	De	Jpn.	Tan
92	覃		Tán / Qín	T'an^{2}	Tam		Thâm		Thàm		Thóm		Dae	De	Phil.	Tam
93	武		Wǔ	Wu^{3}	Mo	Mou	Bú	Boo	Vú	Moo; Woo	Mú		Wu	Ghu; Woo	Viet.	Vũ; Võ
93	武		Wǔ	Wu^{3}	Mo	Mou	Bú	Boo	Vú	Moo; Woo	Mú		Wu	Ghu; Woo	Kor.	Mu (무)
93	武		Wǔ	Wu^{3}	Mo	Mou	Bú	Boo	Vú	Moo; Woo	Mú		Wu	Ghu; Woo	Jpn.	Bu
94	錢	钱	Qián	Ch'ien^{2}	Chin	Chee	Chîⁿ	Chee	Tshièn	Chen	Chhién		Zhi	Zee	Viet.	Tiền
94	錢	钱	Qián	Ch'ien^{2}	Chin	Chee	Chîⁿ	Chee	Tshièn	Chen	Chhién		Zhi	Zee	Kor.	Jeon (전)
94	錢	钱	Qián	Ch'ien^{2}	Chin	Chee	Chîⁿ	Chee	Tshièn	Chen	Chhién		Zhi	Zee	Jpn.	Sen
94	錢	钱	Qián	Ch'ien^{2}	Chin	Chee	Chîⁿ	Chee	Tshièn	Chen	Chhién		Zhi	Zee	Phil.	Chi
95	戴		Dài	Tai^{4}	Tai		Tè (X, Z, K, T); Tèr (Q)	Tai	Tai	Tai	Thài		Ta	Da	Viet.	Đái; Đới
95	戴		Dài	Tai^{4}	Tai		Tè (X, Z, K, T); Tèr (Q)	Tai	Tai	Tai	Thài		Ta	Da	Kor.	Dae (대)
95	戴		Dài	Tai^{4}	Tai		Tè (X, Z, K, T); Tèr (Q)	Tai	Tai	Tai	Thài		Ta	Da	Jpn.	Tai
95	戴		Dài	Tai^{4}	Tai		Tè (X, Z, K, T); Tèr (Q)	Tai	Tai	Tai	Thài		Ta	Da	Phil.	Te
96	嚴	严	Yán	Yen^{2}	Yim	Im	Giâm	Ngiam	Ngiàm	Yam	Ngiēm		Ni	Gni; Nyi	Viet.	Nghiêm
96	嚴	严	Yán	Yen^{2}	Yim	Im	Giâm	Ngiam	Ngiàm	Yam	Ngiēm		Ni	Gni; Nyi	Kor.	Eom (엄)
96	嚴	严	Yán	Yen^{2}	Yim	Im	Giâm	Ngiam	Ngiàm	Yam	Ngiēm		Ni	Gni; Nyi	Jpn.	Gen
96	嚴	严	Yán	Yen^{2}	Yim	Im	Giâm	Ngiam	Ngiàm	Yam	Ngiēm		Ni	Gni; Nyi	Phil.	Gan
97	歐	欧	Ōu	Ou^{1}	Au		Au	Eu					Eu		Jpn.	Ō
98	莫		Mò	Mo^{4}	Mok		Bo̍h (K, T); Bo̍k	Mok	Mo̍k	Mok	Mok		Moh	Moq	Viet.	Mạc
98	莫		Mò	Mo^{4}	Mok		Bo̍h (K, T); Bo̍k	Mok	Mo̍k	Mok	Mok		Moh	Moq	Kor.	Mo (모)
98	莫		Mò	Mo^{4}	Mok		Bo̍h (K, T); Bo̍k	Mok	Mo̍k	Mok	Mok		Moh	Moq	Jpn.	Baku
99	孔		Kǒng	K'ung^{3}	Hung		Khóng	Kong; Khong	Khúng	Koong; Khoong	Khúng		Khon	Kung	Viet.	Khổng
99	孔		Kǒng	K'ung^{3}	Hung		Khóng	Kong; Khong	Khúng	Koong; Khoong	Khúng		Khon	Kung	Kor.	Kong (공)
99	孔		Kǒng	K'ung^{3}	Hung		Khóng	Kong; Khong	Khúng	Koong; Khoong	Khúng		Khon	Kung	Jpn.	Kyō
99	孔		Kǒng	K'ung^{3}	Hung		Khóng	Kong; Khong	Khúng	Koong; Khoong	Khúng		Khon	Kung	Phil.	Consunji, Kong, Hung
100	向		Xiàng	Hsiang^{4}	Heung		Hiòng (X, Q, K, T); Hiàng (Z)	Hiang	Hióng		Hiòng		Shian	Hian	Viet.	Hưởng
100	向		Xiàng	Hsiang^{4}	Heung		Hiòng (X, Q, K, T); Hiàng (Z)	Hiang	Hióng		Hiòng		Shian	Hian	Kor.	Hyang (향)
100	向		Xiàng	Hsiang^{4}	Heung		Hiòng (X, Q, K, T); Hiàng (Z)	Hiang	Hióng		Hiòng		Shian	Hian	Jpn.	Kyō
101	常		Cháng	Ch'ang^{2}	Sheung		Siông (X, Q, K, T); Siâng (Z)	Sioh; Seoh	Sòng	Song	Sōng		Zan		Viet.	Thường
101	常		Cháng	Ch'ang^{2}	Sheung		Siông (X, Q, K, T); Siâng (Z)	Sioh; Seoh	Sòng	Song	Sōng		Zan		Kor.	Sang (상)
101	常		Cháng	Ch'ang^{2}	Sheung		Siông (X, Q, K, T); Siâng (Z)	Sioh; Seoh	Sòng	Song	Sōng		Zan		Jpn.	Shō
101	常		Cháng	Ch'ang^{2}	Sheung		Siông (X, Q, K, T); Siâng (Z)	Sioh; Seoh	Sòng	Song	Sōng		Zan		Misc.	Sōng, Thōng
102	湯	汤	Tāng	T'ang^{1}	Tong		Thng	Tng; Teung	Thông	Thong; Tong	Thong		Thaon	Thaan	Viet.	Thang
102	湯	汤	Tāng	T'ang^{1}	Tong		Thng	Tng; Teung	Thông	Thong; Tong	Thong		Thaon	Thaan	Jpn.	Tō
102	湯	汤	Tāng	T'ang^{1}	Tong		Thng	Tng; Teung	Thông	Thong; Tong	Thong		Thaon	Thaan	Phil.	Tang
103	康		Kāng	Kang^{1}	Hong		Khng	Kang; Khang	Không	Khong; Kong	Khong		Khaon	Khaan	Viet.	Khang
103	康		Kāng	Kang^{1}	Hong		Khng	Kang; Khang	Không	Khong; Kong	Khong		Khaon	Khaan	Kor.	Gang (강)
103	康		Kāng	Kang^{1}	Hong		Khng	Kang; Khang	Không	Khong; Kong	Khong		Khaon	Khaan	Jpn.	Kō
103	康		Kāng	Kang^{1}	Hong		Khng	Kang; Khang	Không	Khong; Kong	Khong		Khaon	Khaan	Phil.	Kang
104	易		Yì	I^{4}	Yik		E̍k (X, Z, K, T); Ia̍k (Q)	Ek	Yit		Iak		I Yih	Yiq	Viet.	Dịch
104	易		Yì	I^{4}	Yik		E̍k (X, Z, K, T); Ia̍k (Q)	Ek	Yit		Iak		I Yih	Yiq	Kor.	Yee (이)
104	易		Yì	I^{4}	Yik		E̍k (X, Z, K, T); Ia̍k (Q)	Ek	Yit		Iak		I Yih	Yiq	Jpn.	Eki, I
105	喬	乔	Qiáo	Ch'iao^{2}	Kiu		Kiâu	Keow; Kiao	Khiàu	Kiew; Khiew	Khiéu		Jiau	Djio; Jioh	Viet.	Kiều
105	喬	乔	Qiáo	Ch'iao^{2}	Kiu		Kiâu	Keow; Kiao	Khiàu	Kiew; Khiew	Khiéu		Jiau	Djio; Jioh	Kor.	Kyo (교)
105	喬	乔	Qiáo	Ch'iao^{2}	Kiu		Kiâu	Keow; Kiao	Khiàu	Kiew; Khiew	Khiéu		Jiau	Djio; Jioh	Jpn.	Kyō
106	賴	赖	Lài	Lai^{4}	Lay	Lai	Lōa (X, Z, K, T); Lòa (Q)	Nai	Lai	Lài	Lài		La	Le; Lae	Viet.	Lại
106	賴	赖	Lài	Lai^{4}	Lay	Lai	Lōa (X, Z, K, T); Lòa (Q)	Nai	Lai	Lài	Lài		La	Le; Lae	Kor.	Roe (뢰); Noe (뇌)
106	賴	赖	Lài	Lai^{4}	Lay	Lai	Lōa (X, Z, K, T); Lòa (Q)	Nai	Lai	Lài	Lài		La	Le; Lae	Jpn.	Rai
107	文		Wén	When^{2}	Man		Bûn	Boon	Vùn	Voon	Mūn		Ven	Vung	Viet.	Văn
107	文		Wén	When^{2}	Man		Bûn	Boon	Vùn	Voon	Mūn		Ven	Vung	Kor.	Moon (문)
107	文		Wén	When^{2}	Man		Bûn	Boon	Vùn	Voon	Mūn		Ven	Vung	Jpn.	Bun
108	施		Shī	Shih^{1}	Si	Xi	Si; Soa	Sy; Sua	Sṳ̂	Sii´			Sy	Si	Viet.	Thí
108	施		Shī	Shih^{1}	Si	Xi	Si; Soa	Sy; Sua	Sṳ̂	Sii´			Sy	Si	Kor.	Si (시)
108	施		Shī	Shih^{1}	Si	Xi	Si; Soa	Sy; Sua	Sṳ̂	Sii´			Sy	Si	Jpn.	Shi, I
108	施		Shī	Shih^{1}	Si	Xi	Si; Soa	Sy; Sua	Sṳ̂	Sii´			Sy	Si	Phil.	Sy, Siy, See, Sze, Shi
109	洪		Hóng	Hung^{2}	Hung	Huhng	Âng; Hông	Ang; Hong	Fùng	Fung			Ghon	Won; Ung One	Viet.	Hồng
109	洪		Hóng	Hung^{2}	Hung	Huhng	Âng; Hông	Ang; Hong	Fùng	Fung			Ghon	Won; Ung One	Kor.	Hong (홍)
109	洪		Hóng	Hung^{2}	Hung	Huhng	Âng; Hông	Ang; Hong	Fùng	Fung			Ghon	Won; Ung One	Jpn.	Kō
109	洪		Hóng	Hung^{2}	Hung	Huhng	Âng; Hông	Ang; Hong	Fùng	Fung			Ghon	Won; Ung One	Phil.	Ang, Hong
110	辛		Xīn	Hsin^{1}	San	Sen	Sîn	Sin	Sîn	Xin´	Sîng		Shin	Sin	Viet.	Tân
110	辛		Xīn	Hsin^{1}	San	Sen	Sîn	Sin	Sîn	Xin´	Sîng		Shin	Sin	Kor.	Shin (신)
110	辛		Xīn	Hsin^{1}	San	Sen	Sîn	Sin	Sîn	Xin´	Sîng		Shin	Sin	Jpn.	Shin
110	辛		Xīn	Hsin^{1}	San	Sen	Sîn	Sin	Sîn	Xin´	Sîng		Shin	Sin	Phil.	Sin, Sing, Singson
111	柯		Kē	kʻo^{1}	O	Ngo	Koa, Kho	Ko,	Ker, Quah, Kwa	Khô	Ko´		Khu	Koo	Viet.	Kha
111	柯		Kē	kʻo^{1}	O	Ngo	Koa, Kho	Ko,	Ker, Quah, Kwa	Khô	Ko´		Khu	Koo	Kor.	Ga (가)
111	柯		Kē	kʻo^{1}	O	Ngo	Koa, Kho	Ko,	Ker, Quah, Kwa	Khô	Ko´		Khu	Koo	Jpn.	Ka
111	柯		Kē	kʻo^{1}	O	Ngo	Koa, Kho	Ko,	Ker, Quah, Kwa	Khô	Ko´		Khu	Koo	Phil.	Cua, Kua, Kho, Ko, Co, Coson
112	莊	庄	Zhuāng	Chuang^{1}	Tsong	Chong, Jong	Chng, Chong	Cheng	Chông	Zong´	Chang		Tsaon	Tsaan; Tzaon	Viet.	Trang
112	莊	庄	Zhuāng	Chuang^{1}	Tsong	Chong, Jong	Chng, Chong	Cheng	Chông	Zong´	Chang		Tsaon	Tsaan; Tzaon	Kor.	Jang (장)
112	莊	庄	Zhuāng	Chuang^{1}	Tsong	Chong, Jong	Chng, Chong	Cheng	Chông	Zong´	Chang		Tsaon	Tsaan; Tzaon	Jpn.	Shō, Sō, Chan
112	莊	庄	Zhuāng	Chuang^{1}	Tsong	Chong, Jong	Chng, Chong	Cheng	Chông	Zong´	Chang		Tsaon	Tsaan; Tzaon	Phil.	Cheng, Ching, Chung, Chong

==== Other surveys ====
- 2006 multi-year survey and study conducted by Yuan Yida, a researcher at the Chinese Academy of Sciences's Institute of Genetics and Developmental Biology, using a sample size of 296 million spread across 1,110 counties and cities and recording around 4,100 surnames.
- 1990: Ji Yuwen Publishing House, based on a sample size of 174,900.
- 1987 study conducted by Yuan Yida with a sample size of 570,000.
- 1977 study published by Li Dongming, a Chinese historian, as "Surname" (《姓》) in Dongfang Magazine.

=== 400 character list ===
Mainland Chinese names by frequency, 2013
1. Wáng (7.17%)
2. Lǐ (7.00%)
3. Zhāng (6.74%)
4. Liú (5.10%)
5. Chén (4.61%)
6. Yáng (3.22%)
7. Huáng (2.45%)
8. Wú (2.00%)
9. Zhào (2.00%)
10. Zhōu (1.90%)
11. Xú (1.45%)
12. Sūn (1.38%)
13. Mǎ (1.29%)
14. Zhū (1.28%)
15. Hú (1.16%)
16. Lín (1.13%)
17. Guō (1.13%)
18. Hé (1.06%)
19. Other (47.9%)

In 2013, the Fuxi Institution compiled a ranking of the 400 most common surnames in China.

400 most common surnames in China
Rank	Name	Pinyin	% of pop.	No. (1,000s)	Province with most
1	王	Wáng	7.17%	95,200	Henan
2	李	Lǐ	7.00%	93,400	Henan
3	张	Zhāng	6.74%	89,600	Henan
4	刘	Liú	5.10%	67,700	Shandong
5	陈	Chén	4.61%	61,300	Guangdong
6	杨	Yáng	3.22%	42,700	Sichuan
7	黄	Huáng	2.45%	32,600	Guangdong
8	吴	Wú	2.00%	26,800	Guangdong
9	赵	Zhào	2.00%	26,700	Henan
10	周	Zhōu	1.90%	25,200	Hunan
11	徐	Xú	1.45%	19,300	Jiangsu
12	孙	Sūn	1.38%	18,300	Shandong
13	马	Mǎ	1.29%	17,200	Henan
14	朱	Zhū	1.28%	17,000	Jiangsu
15	胡	Hú	1.16%	15,500	Hubei
16	林	Lín	1.13%	15,100	Guangdong
17	郭	Guō	1.13%	15,000	Henan
18	何	Hé	1.06%	14,000	Sichuan
19	高	Gāo	1.00%	13,300	Shandong
20	罗	Luó	0.95%	12,600	Sichuan
21	郑	Zhèng	0.93%	12,400	Guangdong
22	梁	Liáng	0.85%	11,300	Guangdong
23	谢	Xiè	0.76%	10,100	Guangdong
24	宋	Sòng	0.70%	9,320	Shandong
25	唐	Táng	0.69%	9,170	Hunan
26	许	Xǔ	0.66%	8,810	Guangdong
27	邓	Dèng	0.62%	8,210	Guangdong
28	冯	Féng	0.62%	8,180	Guangdong
29	韩	Hán	0.61%	8,150	Henan
30	曹	Cáo	0.60%	7,910	Henan
31	曾	Zēng	0.58%	7,720	Guangdong
32	彭	Péng	0.58%	7,660	Hunan
33	萧	Xiāo	0.56%	7,390	Hunan
34	蔡	Cài	0.53%	7,010	Guangdong
35	潘	Pān	0.52%	6,870	Guangdong
36	田	Tián	0.52%	6,850	Henan
37	董	Dǒng	0.51%	6,770	Shandong
38	袁	Yuán	0.50%	6,670	Sichuan
39	于	Yú	0.48%	6,420	Shandong
40	余	Yú	0.48%	6,330	Hubei
41	叶	Yè	0.48%	6,320	Guangdong
42	蒋	Jiǎng	0.48%	6,320	Sichuan
43	杜	Dù	0.47%	6,190	Henan
44	苏	Sū	0.46%	6,060	Guangdong
45	魏	Wèi	0.45%	6,030	Henan
46	程	Chéng	0.45%	6,010	Anhui
47	吕	Lǚ	0.45%	5,960	Shandong
48	丁	Dīng	0.43%	5,760	Jiangsu
49	沈	Shěn	0.41%	5,500	Jiangsu
50	任	Rén	0.41%	5,470	Henan
51	姚	Yáo	0.40%	5,380	Jiangsu
52	卢	Lú	0.40%	5,360	Guangdong
53	傅	Fù	0.40%	5,360	Henan
54	钟	Zhōng	0.40%	5,330	Guangdong
55	姜	Jiāng	0.39%	5,230	Shandong
56	崔	Cuī	0.38%	5,090	Shandong
57	谭	Tán	0.38%	4,990	Hunan
58	廖	Liào	0.37%	4,870	Guangdong
59	范	Fàn	0.36%	4,850	Henan
60	汪	Wāng	0.36%	4,830	Anhui
61	陆	Lù	0.36%	4,800	Guangxi
62	金	Jīn	0.35%	4,670	Zhejiang
63	石	Shí	0.34%	4,550	Henan
64	戴	Dài	0.34%	4,490	Jiangsu
65	贾	Jiǎ	0.33%	4,390	Henan
66	韦	Wéi	0.32%	4,300	Guangxi
67	夏	Xià	0.32%	4,260	Jiangsu
68	邱	Qiū	0.32%	4,230	Guangdong
69	方	Fāng	0.31%	4,130	Anhui
70	侯	Hóu	0.30%	4,010	Henan
71	邹	Zōu	0.30%	3,940	Jiangxi
72	熊	Xióng	0.29%	3,840	Jiangxi
73	孟	Mèng	0.29%	3,830	Shandong
74	秦	Qín	0.29%	3,790	Henan
75	白	Bái	0.28%	3,740	Hebei
76	江	Jiāng	0.28%	3,690	Guangdong
77	阎	Yán	0.27%	3,600	Henan
78	薛	Xuē	0.26%	3,470	Jiangsu
79	尹	Yǐn	0.26%	3,460	Hunan
80	段	Duàn	0.24%	3,200	Henan
81	雷	Léi	0.24%	3,190	Sichuan
82	黎	Lí	0.22%	2,880	Guangdong
83	史	Shǐ	0.21%	2,850	Henan
84	龙	Lóng	0.21%	2,810	Hunan
85	陶	Táo	0.21%	2,740	Anhui
86	贺	Hè	0.21%	2,740	Hunan
87	顾	Gù	0.20%	2,720	Jiangsu
88	毛	Máo	0.20%	2,640	Zhejiang
89	郝	Hǎo	0.20%	2,640	Hebei
90	龚	Gōng	0.20%	2,640	Hunan
91	邵	Shào	0.20%	2,620	Shandong
92	万	Wàn	0.19%	2,540	Jiangxi
93	钱	Qián	0.19%	2,490	Jiangsu
94	严	Yán	0.19%	2,460	Jiangsu
95	赖	Lài	0.18%	2,400	Guangdong
96	覃	Qín	0.18%	2,400	Guangxi
97	洪	Hóng	0.18%	2,400	Taiwan
98	武	Wǔ	0.18%	2,390	Shanxi
99	莫	Mò	0.18%	2,330	Guangxi
100	孔	Kǒng	0.17%	2,310	Shandong
101	汤	Tāng	0.17%	2,270	Jiangsu
102	向	Xiàng	0.17%	2,260	Hunan
103	常	Cháng	0.16%	2,180	Henan
104	温	Wēn	0.16%	2,170	Guangdong
105	康	Kāng	0.16%	2,110	Hebei
106	施	Shī	0.15%	2,060	Jiangsu
107	文	Wén	0.15%	2,040	Sichuan
108	牛	Niú	0.15%	2,020	Henan
109	樊	Fán	0.15%	2,000	Henan
110	葛	Gě	0.15%	1,950	Jiangsu
111	邢	Xíng	0.14%	1,920	Shandong
112	安	Ān	0.13%	1,790	Hebei
113	齐	Qí	0.13%	1,760	Hebei
114	易	Yì	0.13%	1,750	Hunan
115	乔	Qiáo	0.13%	1,730	Henan
116	伍	Wǔ	0.13%	1,710	Guangdong
117	庞	Páng	0.13%	1,670	Guangxi
118	颜	Yán	0.12%	1,640	Hunan
119	倪	Ní	0.12%	1,630	Jiangsu
120	庄	Zhuāng	0.12%	1,620	Guangdong
121	聂	Niè	0.12%	1,590	Jiangxi
122	章	Zhāng	0.12%	1,570	Zhejiang
123	鲁	Lǔ	0.11%	1,510	Henan
124	岳	Yuè	0.11%	1,490	Henan
125	翟	Zhái	0.11%	1,490	Henan
126	殷	Yīn	0.11%	1,470	Jiangsu
127	詹	Zhān	0.11%	1,470	Guangdong
128	申	Shēn	0.11%	1,470	Henan
129	欧	Ōu	0.11%	1,460	Guangdong
130	耿	Gěng	0.11%	1,400	Henan
131	关	Guān	0.10%	1,370	Guangdong
132	兰	Lán	0.10%	1,340	Sichuan
133	焦	Jiāo	0.10%	1,330	Henan
134	俞	Yú	0.10%	1,320	Zhejiang
135	左	Zuǒ	0.10%	1,310	Henan
136	柳	Liǔ	0.10%	1,290	Hubei
137	甘	Gān	0.095%	1,260	Guangxi
138	祝	Zhù	0.090%	1,200	Zhejiang
139	包	Bāo	0.087%	1,150	Inner Mongolia
140	宁	Nìng	0.083%	1,100	Guangxi
141	尚	Shàng	0.082%	1,090	Henan
142	符	Fú	0.082%	1,090	Hainan
143	舒	Shū	0.082%	1,090	Hunan
144	阮	Ruǎn	0.082%	1,090	Guangdong
145	柯	Kē	0.080%	1,060	Hubei
146	纪	Jǐ	0.080%	1,060	Shandong
147	梅	Méi	0.079%	1,050	Hubei
148	童	Tóng	0.079%	1,050	Zhejiang
149	凌	Líng	0.078%	1,030	Guangdong
150	毕	Bì	0.078%	1,030	Shandong
151	单	Shàn	0.076%	1,010	Jiangsu
152	季	Jì	0.076%	1,010	Jiangsu
153	裴	Péi	0.076%	1,000	Henan
154	霍	Huò	0.075%	1,000	Hebei
155	涂	Tú	0.075%	1,000	Jiangxi
156	成	Chéng	0.075%	1,000	Jiangsu
157	苗	Miáo	0.075%	1,000	Henan
158	谷	Gǔ	0.075%	990	Henan
159	盛	Shèng	0.074%	980	Anhui
160	曲	Qū	0.074%	980	Shandong
161	翁	Wēng	0.073%	970	Fujian
162	冉	Rǎn	0.073%	970	Chongqing
163	骆	Luò	0.073%	960	Guangdong
164	蓝	Lán	0.072%	960	Guangxi
165	路	Lù	0.072%	950	Henan
166	游	Yóu	0.071%	940	Fujian
167	辛	Xīn	0.070%	920	Shandong
168	靳	Jìn	0.069%	920	Henan
169	欧阳	Ōuyáng	0.068%	910	Hunan
170	管	Guǎn	0.065%	870	Shandong
171	柴	Chái	0.065%	860	Henan
172	蒙	Méng	0.062%	830	Guangxi
173	鲍	Bào	0.062%	820	Anhui
174	华	Huà	0.061%	820	Jiangsu
175	喻	Yù	0.061%	810	Hunan
176	祁	Qí	0.061%	800	Jiangsu
177	蒲	Pú	0.056%	750	Sichuan
178	房	Fáng	0.056%	750	Shandong
179	滕	Téng	0.055%	740	Shandong
180	屈	Qū	0.055%	730	Shaanxi
181	饶	Ráo	0.055%	730	Jiangxi
182	解	Xiè	0.053%	710	Shandong
183	牟	Mù	0.053%	700	Sichuan
184	艾	Ài	0.052%	690	Hubei
185	尤	Yóu	0.052%	680	Jiangsu
186	阳	Yáng	0.050%	670	Hunan
187	时	Shí	0.050%	670	Henan
188	穆	Mù	0.048%	640	Guizhou
189	农	Nóng	0.047%	620	Guangxi
190	司	Sī	0.044%	590	Henan
191	卓	Zhuó	0.043%	580	Guangdong
192	古	Gǔ	0.043%	580	Guangdong
193	吉	Jí	0.043%	580	Jiangsu
194	缪	Miào	0.043%	570	Jiangsu
195	简	Jiǎn	0.043%	570	Taiwan
196	车	Chē	0.043%	570	Shandong
197	项	Xiàng	0.043%	570	Zhejiang
198	连	Lián	0.043%	570	Fujian
199	芦	Lú	0.042%	570	Henan
200	麦	Mài	0.041%	550	Guangdong
201	褚	Chǔ	0.041%	540	Shandong
202	娄	Lóu	0.040%	530	Henan
203	窦	Dòu	0.040%	530	Shandong
204	戚	Qī	0.040%	530	Jiangsu
205	岑	Cén	0.039%	520	Guangxi
206	景	Jǐng	0.039%	520	Shanxi
207	党	Dǎng	0.039%	520	Shaanxi
208	宫	Gōng	0.039%	520	Shandong
209	费	Fèi	0.039%	510	Jiangsu
210	卜	Bǔ	0.038%	510	Jiangsu
211	冷	Lěng	0.038%	500	Sichuan
212	晏	Yàn	0.038%	500	Jiangxi
213	席	Xí	0.036%	480	Henan
214	卫	Wèi	0.036%	480	Shanxi
215	米	Mǐ	0.035%	460	Hebei
216	柏	Bǎi	0.035%	460	Jiangsu
217	宗	Zōng	0.034%	450	Jiangsu
218	瞿	Qú	0.033%	440	Hunan
219	桂	Guì	0.033%	440	Anhui
220	全	Quán	0.033%	440	Hunan
221	佟	Tóng	0.033%	430	Liaoning
222	应	Yīng	0.033%	430	Zhejiang
223	臧	Zāng	0.032%	430	Shandong
224	闵	Mǐn	0.032%	430	Hubei
225	苟	Gǒu	0.032%	430	Sichuan
226	邬	Wū	0.032%	420	Zhejiang
227	边	Biān	0.032%	420	Hebei
228	卞	Biàn	0.032%	420	Jiangsu
229	姬	Jī	0.032%	420	Henan
230	师	Shī	0.031%	410	Henan
231	和	Hé	0.031%	410	Yunnan
232	仇	Qiú	0.030%	400	Jiangsu
233	栾	Luán	0.030%	400	Shandong
234	隋	Suí	0.030%	400	Shandong
235	商	Shāng	0.030%	390	Shandong
236	刁	Diāo	0.030%	390	Shandong
237	沙	Shā	0.030%	390	Jiangsu
238	荣	Róng	0.029%	380	Shandong
239	巫	Wū	0.029%	380	Guangdong
240	寇	Kòu	0.029%	380	Henan
241	桑	Sāng	0.028%	370	Shandong
242	郎	Láng	0.028%	370	Hebei
243	甄	Zhēn	0.027%	360	Hebei
244	丛	Cóng	0.027%	360	Shandong
245	仲	Zhòng	0.027%	350	Jiangsu
246	虞	Yú	0.026%	350	Zhejiang
247	敖	Áo	0.026%	350	Guizhou
248	巩	Gǒng	0.026%	340	Shandong
249	明	Míng	0.026%	340	Hubei
250	佘	Shé	0.025%	340	Hunan
251	池	Chí	0.025%	340	Fujian
252	查	Zhā	0.025%	330	Anhui
253	麻	Má	0.025%	330	Zhejiang
254	苑	Yuān	0.025%	330	Hebei
255	迟	Chí	0.024%	320	Shandong
256	邝	Kuàng	0.024%	320	Guangdong
257	官	Guān	0.023%	310	Guangdong
258	封	Fēng	0.023%	310	Jiangsu
259	谈	Tán	0.023%	310	Jiangsu
260	匡	Kuāng	0.023%	300	Hunan
261	鞠	Jū	0.023%	300	Shandong
262	惠	Huì	0.022%	298	Shaanxi
263	荆	Jīng	0.022%	289	Shandong
264	乐	Yuè	0.022%	288	Jiangxi
265	冀	Jì	0.021%	285	Hebei
266	郁	Yù	0.021%	285	Jiangsu
267	胥	Xū	0.021%	285	Sichuan
268	南	Nán	0.021%	277	Shaanxi
269	班	Bān	0.021%	273	Guangxi
270	储	Chǔ	0.021%	272	Anhui
271	原	Yuán	0.020%	270	Shanxi
272	栗	Lì	0.020%	266	Henan
273	燕	Yàn	0.020%	264	Shandong
274	楚	Chǔ	0.020%	263	Henan
275	鄢	Yān	0.020%	263	Hubei
276	劳	Láo	0.019%	259	Guangxi
277	谌	Chén	0.019%	248	Hunan
278	奚	Xī	0.017%	231	Jiangsu
279	皮	Pí	0.017%	229	Hunan
280	粟	Sù	0.017%	228	Hunan
281	冼	Xiǎn	0.017%	228	Guangdong
282	蔺	Lìn	0.017%	228	Shandong
283	楼	Lóu	0.017%	228	Zhejiang
284	盘	Pán	0.017%	225	Guangxi
285	满	Mǎn	0.016%	219	Shandong
286	闻	Wén	0.016%	217	Anhui
287	位	Wèi	0.016%	208	Henan
289	厉	Lì	0.016%	206	Zhejiang
289	伊	Yī	0.016%	206	Shandong
290	仝	Tóng	0.015%	200	Henan
291	区	Ōu	0.015%	199	Guangdong
292	郜	Gào	0.015%	198	Henan
293	海	Hǎi	0.015%	197	Ningxia
294	阚	Kàn	0.015%	196	Anhui
295	花	Huā	0.015%	195	Jiangsu
296	权	Quán	0.014%	191	Shaanxi
297	强	Qiáng	0.014%	190	Shaanxi
298	帅	Shuài	0.014%	190	Sichuan
299	屠	Tú	0.014%	189	Zhejiang
300	豆	Dòu	0.014%	188	Henan
301	朴	Piáo	0.014%	187	Jilin
302	盖	Gě	0.014%	186	Shandong
303	练	Liàn	0.014%	185	Guangdong
304	廉	Lián	0.014%	184	Henan
305	禹	Yǔ	0.014%	182	Henan
306	井	Jǐng	0.013%	179	Shandong
307	祖	Zǔ	0.013%	177	Hebei
308	漆	Qī	0.013%	177	Sichuan
309	巴	Bā	0.013%	177	Inner Mongolia
310	丰	Fēng	0.013%	176	Shandong
311	支	Zhī	0.013%	173	Jiangsu
312	卿	Qīng	0.013%	172	Sichuan
313	国	Guó	0.013%	171	Shandong
314	狄	Dí	0.013%	168	Jiangsu
315	平	Píng	0.013%	166	Henan
316	计	Jì	0.012%	165	Anhui
317	索	Suǒ	0.012%	165	Henan
318	宣	Xuān	0.012%	164	Zhejiang
319	晋	Jìn	0.012%	162	Henan
320	相	Xiàng	0.012%	162	Shandong
321	初	Chū	0.012%	159	Shandong
322	门	Mén	0.012%	159	Shandong
323	雲	Yún	0.012%	156	Inner Mongolia
324	容	Róng	0.012%	154	Guangdong
325	敬	Jìng	0.011%	150	Sichuan
326	来	Lái	0.011%	148	Zhejiang
327	扈	Hù	0.011%	147	Henan
328	晁	Cháo	0.011%	146	Henan
329	芮	Ruì	0.011%	146	Jiangsu
330	都	Dū	0.011%	146	Shandong
331	普	Pǔ	0.011%	145	Yunnan
332	阙	Quē	0.011%	145	Fujian
333	浦	Pǔ	0.011%	144	Jiangsu
334	戈	Gē	0.011%	144	Jiangsu
335	伏	Fú	0.011%	143	Sichuan
336	鹿	Lù	0.011%	140	Shandong
337	薄	Bó	0.011%	140	Shandong
338	邸	Dǐ	0.011%	139	Hebei
339	雍	Yōng	0.010%	139	Sichuan
340	辜	Gū	0.010%	138	Sichuan
341	羊	Yáng	0.010%	136	Hainan
342	阿	Ā	0.010%	136	Inner Mongolia
343	乌	Wū	0.010%	135	Inner Mongolia
344	母	Mǔ	0.010%	135	Sichuan
345	裘	Qiú	0.010%	134	Zhejiang
346	亓	Qí	0.010%	134	Shandong
347	修	Xiū	0.010%	133	Shandong
348	邰	Tái	0.010%	130	Guizhou
349	赫	Hè	0.010%	128	Liaoning
350	杭	Háng	0.010%	128	Jiangsu
351	况	Kuàng	0.0094%	124	Chongqing
352	那	Nā	0.0093%	124	Inner Mongolia
353	宿	Sù	0.0093%	123	Shandong
354	鲜	Xiān	0.0092%	122	Sichuan
355	印	Yìn	0.0091%	121	Jiangsu
356	逯	Lù	0.0091%	121	Shandong
357	隆	Lóng	0.0090%	120	Hunan
358	茹	Rú	0.0090%	119	Henan
359	诸	Zhū	0.0089%	118	Zhejiang
360	战	Zhàn	0.0088%	117	Shandong
361	慕	Mù	0.0086%	115	Gansu
362	危	Wēi	0.0084%	112	Jiangxi
363	玉	Yù	0.0084%	112	Guangxi
364	银	Yín	0.0084%	111	Guangxi
365	亢	Kàng	0.0083%	110	Henan
366	嵇	Jī	0.0082%	109	Jiangsu
367	公	Gōng	0.0082%	109	Shandong
368	哈	Hǎ	0.0081%	107	Inner Mongolia
369	湛	Zhàn	0.0079%	105	Hunan
370	宾	Bīn	0.0077%	102	Guangxi
371	戎	Róng	0.0076%	101	Jiangsu
372	勾	Gōu	0.0076%	101	Sichuan
373	茅	Máo	0.0076%	101	Jiangsu
374	利	Lì	0.0076%	100	Guangdong
375	於	Yú	0.0074%	99	Jiangsu
376	呼	Hū	0.0074%	98	Inner Mongolia
377	居	Jū	0.0074%	98	Jiangsu
378	揭	Jiē	0.0073%	96	Jiangxi
379	干	Gān	0.0072%	96	Zhejiang
380	但	Dàn	0.0072%	95	Sichuan
381	尉	Wèi	0.0071%	95	Shanxi
382	冶	Yě	0.0071%	94	Qinghai
383	斯	Sī	0.0070%	93	Inner Mongolia
384	元	Yuán	0.0069%	92	Henan
385	束	Shù	0.0068%	91	Jiangsu
386	檀	Tán	0.0068%	90	Anhui
387	衣	Yī	0.0067%	90	Shandong
388	信	Xìn	0.0067%	89	Shandong
389	展	Zhǎn	0.0067%	89	Shandong
390	阴	Yīn	0.0067%	89	Shanxi
391	昝	Zǎn	0.0066%	87	Sichuan
392	智	Zhì	0.0065%	87	Henan
393	幸	Xìng	0.0065%	86	Chongqing
394	奉	Fèng	0.0064%	85	Hunan
395	植	Zhí	0.0064%	85	Guangdong
396	衡	Héng	0.0063%	84	Jiangsu
397	富	Fù	0.0063%	84	Liaoning
398	尧	Yáo	0.0060%	80	Jiangxi
399	闭	Bì	0.0060%	80	Guangxi
400	由	Yóu	0.0060%	80	Shandong

== Taiwan ==
According to a comprehensive survey of residential permits released by the Taiwanese Ministry of the Interior's Department of Population in 2016, Taiwan has only 1,503 surnames. The top ten surnames in Taiwan accounted for 52.77% of the general population, and the top 100 accounted for 96.56%.

Rank	Character	Romanizations						% of total pop.
Rank	Character	Mandarin		Min Nan		Hakka		% of total pop.
2016	Trad.	Wade	Pinyin	POJ	Other	PFS	Other	% of total pop.
1	陳	Ch'en^{2}	Chén	Tân	Tan	Chin	Thin	11.14%
2	林	Lin^{2}	Lín	Lîm	Lim; Liem	Lim	Lim	8.31%
3	黃	Huang^{2}	Huáng	Ng	Eng; Ung; Uy; Wee	Vòng	Wong; Bong	6.05%
4	張	Chang^{1}	Zhāng	Tiuⁿ	Teo; Teoh; Thio; Tiew	Chông	Chong	5.27%
5	李	Li^{3}	Lǐ	Lí	Lee; Dee	Lí	Lee	5.13%
6	王	Wang^{2}	Wáng	Ông	Heng; Bong	Vòng	Wong	4.11%
7	吳	Wu^{2}	Wú	Gô͘ Ngô͘	Goh; Gouw	Ǹg	Ng	4.04%
8	劉	Liu^{2}	Liú	Lâu	Lao	Liù	Liew	3.16%
9	蔡	Ts'ai^{4}	Cài	Chhoà	Chua; Choa; Tjoa	Chhai	Chai; Choi	2.91%
10	楊	Yang^{2}	Yáng	Iûⁿ	Eaw; Joe; Nyo; Yong	Yòng	Yong; Yeong	2.66%
11	許	Hsü^{3}	Xǔ	Khó͘	Ko; Koh	Hi	Hee	—
12	鄭	Cheng^{4}	Zhèng	Tīⁿ; Tēⁿ	Teh	Chhang	Chang	—
13	謝	Hsieh^{4}	Xiè	Chiā; Siā	Cheah; Seah	Tshia	Cheah	—
14	洪	Hung^{2}	Hóng	Âng; Hông	Ang; Hong	Fùng	Fung	—
15	郭	Kuo^{1}	Guō	Koeh	Kueh	Kwok	Kok	—
16	邱	Ch'iu^{1}	Qiū	Khu	Khoo; Kho	Hiû; Khiû	Hew; Khew	—
17	曾	Tseng^{1}	Zēng	Chan		Tsên	Chen	—
18	廖	Liao^{4}	Liào	Liāu	Leow; Liow	Liau	Lieu	—
19	賴	Lai^{4}	Lài	Lōa	Nai	Lài		—
20	徐	Hsü^{2}	Xú	Chhî	Chee; Jee; Ji	Chhì	Chi	—
21	周	Chou^{1}	Zhōu	Chiu	Chew	Chiû	Cher; Chiew	—
22	葉	Yeh^{4}	Yè	Ia̍p	Yap	Yap		—
23	蘇	Su^{1}	Sū	So͘	Soh	Sû	Soo	—
24	莊	Chuang^{1}	Zhuāng	Chong	Cheng	Chông	Zong	—
25	呂	Lü^{3}	Lǚ	Lū; Lī; Līr	Lee; Leu; Loo	Lî	Lee	—
26	江	Chiang^{1}	Jiāng	Kang		Kông	Kong	—
27	何	Hê^{2} Ho^{2}	Hé	Hô	Ho; Hou	Hò	Ho	—
28	蕭	Hsiao^{1}	Xiāo	Siau; Sio	Seow; Siow	Siâu	Siaw; Siew	—
29	羅	Lo^{2}	Luó	Lô	Lo; Law	Lò	Law; Lo; Loh	—
30	高	Kao^{1}	Gāo	Ko	Koh	Kô; Kau	Koo	—

=== Other surveys ===
- 1994–2011: The American researcher Chih-Hao Tsai has compiled unauthoritative annual surveys of the most common surnames on Taiwan based on published lists of all successful applicants taking Taiwan's Joint College Entrance Exam. The test was mandatory for college entrance until 2002 and is still quite common, with more than a hundred thousand successful applicants a year and a pass rate for all test takers between 60 and 90%.

== Philippines ==
Chinese Filipinos whose ancestors came to the Philippines from 1898 onward usually have single syllable Chinese surnames. On the other hand, most who have Chinese ancestors who came to the Philippines prior to 1898 usually have multiple-syllable Chinese surnames such as Cuyegkeng, Gokongwei, Ongpin, CuUnjieng, Pempengco, Yuchengco, Teehankee, Tansipek, and Yaptinchay among such others. These were originally full Chinese names which were transliterated in Spanish orthography and adopted as surnames.

Common Chinese Filipino surnames are: Tan/Chan (陳/陈), Dy/Dee/Lee/Li (李), Sy/See/Siy/Sze (施), Lim/Lam (林), Chua/Choa/Choi (蔡), Yap/Ip (葉/叶), Co/Ko/Kho (許/许), Ko/Gao/Caw (高), Ho/Haw/Hau/Caw (侯), Cua/Kua/Co/Kho/Ko (柯), Coo/Gu/Ku/Khu/Cu (邱), Go/Ngo/Wu (吳/吴), Ong/Wong (王), Ang/Hong/Hung (洪), Lao (劉/刘), Tiu/Cheung (張/张), Yu/Young (楊/杨), Auyong/Awyoung (歐陽/欧阳), Ng/Uy/Wee/Hong/Wong/Huang (黃), Tiu/Chiu/Chio/Chu (趙/赵), Chu/Chiu/Chow (周), King (龔), Chan (曾), Ty/Tee (鄭/郑), Ching/Cheng/Chong (莊/庄), Que/Cue/Kwok (郭), Leong/Liong/Leung (梁), etc.

There are also multiple-syllable Chinese surnames that are Spanish transliterations of Hokkien words. Surnames like Tuazon (eldest grandson, 大孫), Dizon (second grandson, 二孫), Samson/Sanson (third grandson, 三孫), Sison (fourth grandson, 四孫), Guzon/Gozum/Gozon/Goson (fifth grandson, 五孫), Lacson (sixth grandson, 六孫), Tecson/Ticzon/Tiongson/Teoxon (seventh grandson, 德孫/提克宗/頂客/东阳顺), Sioson (eighth grandson, 西奥森) and Hizon (ninth grandson, 希森) are examples of transliterations of designations that use the Hokkien suffix -son (孫) used as surnames for some Chinese Filipinos who trace their ancestry from Chinese immigrants to the Philippines during the Spanish colonial period. The surname "Timkang" (添康) is listed in the Chinese text Hundred Family Surnames, perhaps shedding light on the Hokkien suffix -Kang used here as a surname alongside some sort of accompanying enumeration scheme.

Rank (2020)	Name	Character(s)	Total number (2020)
1	Tan	陳	123,290
2	Dizon	二孫	106,507
3	Lim	林	96,874
4	Samson	三孫	66,516
5	Sison	四孫	57,840
6	Chua	蔡	51,380
7	Uy	黃	47,832
8	Ong	王	39,649
9	Yap	葉	37,703
10	Go	吳	37,354
11	Tuazon	大孫	36,543
12	Cinco	新哥	29,718
13	Sy	施	28,038
14	Yu	楊	27,732
15	Sayson	世孫/西孫	26,833
16	Quiambao	鹹賺/欠賺	25,555
17	Chan	曾,陳	24,835
18	Cuizon	貴孫/歸孫	23,732
19	Ang	洪	23,341
20	Tecson	德孫	22,679
21	Timkang	添康	17,900

== Canada ==
=== Ontario ===
A 2010 study by Baiju Shah & al data-mined the Registered Persons Database of Canadian health card recipients in the province of Ontario for a particularly Chinese-Canadian name list. Ignoring potentially non-Chinese spellings such as Lee (49,898 total), they found that the most common Chinese names in Ontario were:

Rank	Name	Total number	Character(s)		Romanization
Rank	Name	Total number	Trad.	Simp.	Romanization
1	Wong	34,567	王		Wáng, Wong
1	Wong	34,567	黃	黄	Huáng, Hwang, Hawang, Whang, Whong
1	Wong	34,567	汪		Wāng, Wong, Wung
2	Chan	32,692	陳	陈	Chan, Chén
3	Li	27,608	李		Ly, Lee, Lei, Lǐ
3	Li	27,608	黎		Lai, Ly, Lee, Lei, Lí
4	Chen	25,618	陳	陈	Chan, Chén
5	Wang	22,548	王		Wáng, Wong
5	Wang	22,548	汪		Wāng, Wong
6	Liu	18,784	劉	刘	Lau, Liew, Liú, Low
6	Liu	18,784	廖		Lau, Lew, Liào, Lieu, Liew, Liu
7	Zhang	18,003	張	张	Chang, Chong, Chung, Cheung, Teo, Zhāng, Zheung
8	Lam	15,910	林		Lam, Lín
8	Lam	15,910	藍	蓝	Lán
9	Leung	13,696	梁		Leung, Liáng
10	Ho	12,830	何		Hé, Ho
10	Ho	12,830	賀	贺	Hè, Ho

== Indonesia ==
Nearly as large is the Chinese Indonesian community. The 2010 Indonesian census reported more than 2.8 million self-identified Chinese, or about 1% of the general population. Just as in Thailand, though, previous legislation (in this case, 127/U/Kep/12/1966) had banned ethnic Chinese surnames throughout the country. This law was abolished after the removal of Suharto, but Chinese Indonesian names remain a mix of Indonesian, pinyin, pe̍h-ōe-jī, and Dutch-spelled Hokkien.

== Malaysia ==
During the 2010 Malaysian Census, there were approximately 6,960,000 Malaysians of Chinese ethnicity. The Chinese are the second largest ethnicity in Malaysia, after the Malays.

== Singapore ==
Chinese Singaporean surnames by frequency
1. Tan (9.50%)
2. Lim (6.60%)
3. Lee (4.50%)
4. Ng (4.20%)
5. Ong (2.70%)
6. Wong (2.60%)
7. Goh (2.20%)
8. Chua (2.20%)
9. Chan (1.90%)
10. Koh (1.90%)
11. Teo (1.90%)
12. Ang (1.70%)
13. Yeo (1.50%)
14. Tay (1.40%)
15. Ho (1.30%)
16. Low (1.30%)
17. Other (52.6%)

Ethnic Chinese make up almost three-fourths (2009) of Singapore's resident population of nearly four million (2011).

=== 2000 ===
According to Statistics Singapore, as of 2000, the most common Chinese Singaporean names were:

Rank	Name	Origin	Total number (2000)	% (Chinese population)	Character(s)		Pinyin	Other forms
Rank	Name	Origin	Total number (2000)	% (Chinese population)	Trad.	Simp.	Pinyin	Other forms
1	Tan	Hokkien; Teochew; Hainanese	237,800	9.5	陳	陈	Chén	Chan for Cantonese Chin for Hakka
2	Lim	Hokkien; Teochew; Hainanese; Hakka	166,000	6.6	林		Lín	Lam or Lum for Cantonese
3	Lee	Hokkien; Teochew; Cantonese; Hainanese; Hakka	112,600	4.5	李		Lǐ	
4	Ng	Hokkien; Teochew	106,200	4.2	黃	黄	Huáng	
4	Ng	Hakka; Cantonese	106,200	4.2	吳	吴	Wú	
4	Ng	Hakka; Cantonese	106,200	4.2	伍		Wǔ	
5	Ong	Hokkien	66,700	2.7	王		Wáng	
5	Ong	Hokkien	66,700	2.7	汪		Wāng	
6	Wong	Cantonese; Hainanese; Hakka	65,000	2.6	王		Wáng	
6	Wong	Cantonese; Hainanese; Hakka	65,000	2.6	汪		Wāng	
6	Wong	Cantonese; Hainanese; Hakka	65,000	2.6	黃	黄	Huáng	
7	Goh	Hokkien; Teochew	56,200	2.2	吳	吴	Wú	
8	Chua	Hokkien; Teochew	54,600	2.2	蔡		Cài	Choy for Cantonese Chai for Hakka
9	Chan	Cantonese	48,400	1.9	陳	陈	Chén	
9	Chan	Hokkien; Teochew	48,400	1.9	曾		Zēng	
10	Koh	Hokkien; Teochew	48,100	1.9	許	许	Xǔ	Hee for Hakka
11	Teo	Hokkien; Teochew	46,800	1.9	張	张	Zhāng	Cheong for Cantonese Chong for Hakka
12	Ang	Hokkien; Teochew	43,600	1.7	洪		Hóng	
12	Ang	Hokkien	43,600	1.7	翁		Wēng	
13	Yeo	Hokkien; Teochew	36,600	1.5	楊	杨	Yáng	
13	Yeo	Hokkien; Teochew	36,600	1.5	姚		Yáo	
14	Tay	Hokkien; Teochew	35,800	1.4	鄭	郑	Zhèng	
15	Ho	Hokkien; Teochew; Cantonese; Hakka; Hainanese	35,000	1.4	何		Hé	
16	Low	Teochew; Hokkien	31,600	1.3	劉	刘	Liú	
17	Toh	Teochew; Hokkien	25,300	1.0	杜		Dù	
17	Toh	Teochew; Hokkien	25,300	1.0	卓		Zhuó	
18	Sim	Teochew; Hokkien	23,800	0.9	沈		Shěn	
19	Chong	Hakka	23,100	0.9	張	张	Zhāng	
19	Chong	Cantonese; Hakka	23,100	0.9	莊	庄	Zhuāng	
19	Chong	Cantonese; Hakka	23,100	0.9	鍾	钟	Zhōng	
20	Chia	Hokkien; Teochew; Hakka	22,600	0.9	謝	谢	Xiè	

- As most Singaporeans of Chinese descent have ancestors which originated from Southern China, mainly from Fujian, Guangdong and Hainan, the distribution of surnames in Singapore is quite different from that of Mainland China.
- As there are a variety of dialect groups in Singapore, the same surname in Chinese characters may be romanised in several different ways in Singapore. Some less common Chinese transcriptions of the 20 most common romanised surnames may not be listed in the table above.

=== Newer version ===
There is a newer list of most common surnames in Singapore from an unknown year. Some numbers are missing as the original list contains several non-Chinese surnames, which have been excluded from the table below.

Rank	Name	Origin	Total number	Character(s)		Pinyin
Rank	Name	Origin	Total number	Trad.	Simp.	Pinyin
1	Tan	Hokkien; Teochew; Hainanese; Henghua	276,329	陳	陈	Chén
2	Lim	Hokkien; Teochew; Hainanese; Hakka	196,492	林		Lín
3	Lee	Hokkien; Teochew; Cantonese; Hainanese; Hakka	151,278	李		Lǐ
4	Ng	Hokkien; Teochew; Henghua	125,122	黃	黄	Huáng
4	Ng	Hakka; Cantonese	125,122	吳	吴	Wú
4	Ng	Hakka; Cantonese	125,122	伍		Wǔ
5	Wong	Cantonese; Hainanese; Hakka; Eastern Min	90,861	王		Wáng
5	Wong	Cantonese; Hainanese; Hakka; Eastern Min	90,861	汪		Wāng
5	Wong	Cantonese; Hainanese; Hakka; Eastern Min	90,861	黃	黄	Huáng
6	Ong	Hokkien	80,354	王		Wáng
6	Ong	Hokkien	80,354	汪		Wāng
6	Ong	Hainanese; Henghua	80,354	翁		Wēng
7	Goh	Hokkien; Teochew; Hainanese	72,248	吳	吴	Wú
8	Chan	Cantonese	69,355	陳	陈	Chén
8	Chan	Hokkien; Teochew	69,355	曾		Zēng
8	Chan	Hokkien	69,355	田		Tián
9	Chua	Hokkien; Teochew	67,321	蔡		Cài
10	Koh	Hokkien; Teochew	61,941	許	许	Xǔ
10	Koh	Hokkien; Teochew	61,941	高		Gāo
11	Teo	Hokkien; Teochew	59,487	張	张	Zhāng
11	Teo	Hokkien; Teochew	59,487	趙	赵	Zhào
12	Ang	Hokkien; Teochew; Henghua	52,131	洪		Hóng
12	Ang	Hokkien	52,131	翁		Wēng
13	Ho	Hokkien; Teochew; Cantonese; Hakka; Hainanese	50,949	何		Hé
14	Tay	Hokkien; Teochew	49,438	鄭	郑	Zhèng
14	Tay	Hokkien; Henghua	49,438	戴		Dài
15	Yeo	Hokkien; Teochew	48,889	楊	杨	Yáng
15	Yeo	Hokkien; Teochew	48,889	姚		Yáo
16	Low	Teochew; Hokkien; Cantonese; Hakka; Henghua	43,122	劉	刘	Liú
16	Low	Teochew; Hokkien; Cantonese; Hakka; Henghua	43,122	羅	罗	Luó
16	Low	Teochew; Hokkien; Cantonese; Hakka; Henghua	43,122	盧	卢	Lú
16	Low	Teochew; Hokkien; Cantonese; Hakka; Henghua	43,122	駱	骆	Luò
17	Chong	Hakka	41,552	張	张	Zhāng
17	Chong	Cantonese; Hakka	41,552	莊	庄	Zhuāng
17	Chong	Cantonese; Hakka	41,552	鍾	钟	Zhōng
18	Chen	Mandarin	35,895	陳	陈	Chén
18	Chen	Hakka	35,895	曾		Zēng
19	Leong	Cantonese; Hakka	32,898	梁		Liáng
19	Leong	Hokkien	32,898	龍	龙	Lóng
20	Loh	Hokkien; Teochew; Cantonese; Hakka; Hainanese	32,808	羅	罗	Luó
20	Loh		32,808	盧	卢	Lú
20	Loh	Hokkien	32,808	駱	骆	Luò
21	Chia	Hokkien; Teochew; Hakka	32,718	謝	谢	Xiè
22	Sim	Hokkien; Teochew; Hakka	32,621	沈		Shěn
23	Chew	Hokkien; Teochew; Hainanese; Hakka; Henghua	31,051	周		Zhōu
23	Chew	Cantonese	31,051	趙	赵	Zhào
24	Wang	Mandarin; Hainanese	28,888	王		Wáng
24	Wang	Mandarin	28,888	汪		Wāng
25	Yap	Hokkien; Teochew; Hainanese; Hakka	28,636	葉	叶	Yè
26	Toh	Teochew; Hokkien	28,268	杜		Dù
26	Toh	Teochew; Hokkien	28,268	卓		Zhuó
27	Li	Mandarin	26,363	李		Lǐ
28	Wee	Hokkien; Hainanese	25,278	黃	黄	Huáng
28	Wee	Hokkien	25,278	阮		Ruǎn
29	Tang	Teochew	24,548	陳	陈	Chén
29	Tang	Hokkien; Teochew	24,548	董		Dǒng
29	Tang	Cantonese	24,548	鄧	邓	Dèng
29	Tang	Eastern Min	24,548	鄭	郑	Zhèng
29	Tang	Mandarin	24,548	唐		Táng
29	Tang	Mandarin	24,548	湯	汤	Tāng
30	Yong	Cantonese; Hakka	24,503	楊	杨	Yáng
31	Foo	Hainanese	24,438	符		Fú
31	Foo	Hakka	24,438	胡		Hú
32	Soh	Hokkien; Teochew; Cantonese	23,818	蘇	苏	Sū
33	Chin	Hakka	23,211	陳	陈	Chén
33	Chin	Cantonese	23,211	錢	钱	Qián
34	Lin	Mandarin	23,056	林		Lín
35	Chng	Teochew; Hokkien	21,339	莊	庄	Zhuāng
36	Lau	Teochew; Hokkien; Cantonese	21,047	劉	刘	Liú
37	Zhang	Mandarin	19,549	張	张	Zhāng
38	Cheng	Cantonese; Hainanese	19,401	鄭	郑	Zhèng
38	Cheng	Teochew; Hokkien	19,401	鍾	钟	Zhōng
38	Cheng	Mandarin	19,401	程		Chéng
39	Choo	Hokkien; Teochew; Hainanese	19,181	朱		Zhū
39	Choo	Hakka	19,181	周		Zhōu
40	Liu	Mandarin	18,374	劉	刘	Liú
41	Lai	Cantonese	18,303	黎		Lí
41	Lai	Cantonese; Hakka	18,303	赖		Lài
42	Cheong	Cantonese	17,993	張	张	Zhāng
42	Cheong	Eastern Min	17,993	蔣	蒋	Jiǎng
43	Chee	Hokkien; Hakka	17,870	徐		Xú
44	Heng	Teochew	17,631	王		Wáng
45	Quek	Teochew	17,418	郭		Guō
46	Peh	Teochew; Hokkien	16,845	白		Bái
47	Khoo	Teochew; Hokkien	16,572	丘		Qīu
47	Khoo	Teochew; Hokkien	16,572	邱		Qīu
48	Poh	Hokkien	16,527	傅		Fù
49	Seah	Teochew; Hokkien	16,197	謝	谢	Xiè
49	Seah	Teochew; Hokkien	16,197	佘		Shé
50	Pang	Teochew; Hokkien; Hainanese	15,778	馮	冯	Féng
50	Pang	Mandarin	15,778	龐	庞	Páng
50	Pang	Cantonese; Hakka	15,778	彭		Péng
51	Huang	Mandarin	15,519	黃	黄	Huáng
52	Liew	Hakka	14,906	劉	刘	Liú
53	Yang	Mandarin; Cantonese	14,809	楊	杨	Yáng
54	Neo	Hokkien	14,550	梁		Liáng
55	Lam	Hokkien; Hakka; Cantonese	13,640	藍	蓝	Lán
55	Lam	Cantonese	13,640	林		Lín
56	Chang	Cantonese; Teochew	13,252	曾		Zēng
56	Chang	Hakka	13,252	鄭	郑	Zhèng
57	Gan	Hokkien	13,130	顏	颜	Yán
58	Han	Mandarin	12,962	韓	韩	Hán
59	Song	Mandarin; Teochew; Cantonese	12,878	宋		Sòng
60	Wu	Mandarin	12,839	吳	吴	Wú
61	Hong	Mandarin; Cantonese; Hainanese	12,645	洪		Hóng
61	Hong	Cantonese	12,645	康		Kāng
61	Hong	Cantonese	12,645	熊		Xióng
61	Hong	Henghua	12,645	方		Fāng
62	Chow	Cantonese	12,096	周		Zhōu
62	Chow	Teochew; Hokkien	12,096	曹		Cáo
62	Chow	Hakka	12,096	趙	赵	Zhào
63	Kok	Cantonese	11,903	郭		Guō
64	Tham	Hokkien; Teochew; Cantonese; Hakka; Hainanese	11,715	譚	谭	Tán
65	Ling	Eastern Min	11,321	林		Lín
65	Ling	Mandarin	11,321	凌		Líng
66	Wei	Mandarin	11,276	魏		Wèi
67	See	Hokkien	11,063	施		Shī
67	See	Teochew; Hokkien	11,063	薛		Xuē
68	Oh	Teochew; Hokkien	10,617	胡		Hú
69	Yu	Mandarin	10,475	于		Yú
69	Yu	Mandarin	10,475	余		Yú
70	Seet	Cantonese	10,361	薛		Xuē
71	Fong	Cantonese	10,346	方		Fāng
71	Fong	Cantonese	10,346	馮	冯	Féng
72	Loo	Cantonese; Hakka	10,340	羅	罗	Luó
72	Loo	Eastern Min	10,340	盧	卢	Lú
73	Kong	Cantonese	9,642	江		Jiāng
73	Kong	Mandarin	9,642	孔		Kǒng
74	Phua	Teochew; Hokkien; Hainanese	9,545	潘		Pān
75	Yee		9,487	于		Yú
75	Yee	Cantonese; Hakka	9,487	余		Yú
76	Seow	Hokkien; Teochew; Hakka	9,442	蕭	萧	Xiāo
77	Teng	Hokkien; Teochew	9,339	鄧	邓	Dèng
77	Teng	Henghua	9,339	陳	陈	Chén
78	Xu	Mandarin	8,822	許	许	Xǔ
78	Xu	Mandarin	8,822	徐		Xú
79	Kang	Hokkien	8,292	江		Jiāng
79	Kang		8,292	姜		Jiāng
79	Kang	Mandarin	8,292	康		Kāng
80	Tong	Cantonese	8,150	董		Dǒng
80	Tong	Cantonese	8,150	唐		Táng
80	Tong	Mandarin	8,150	童		Tóng
81	Leow	Hokkien; Teochew; Hakka	8,021	廖		Liào
82	Chai	Cantonese; Hakka	7,950	蔡		Cài
83	Teh	Teochew; Hokkien	7,711	鄭	郑	Zhèng
84	Png	Teochew; Hokkien	7,687	方		Fāng
85	Soon	Hokkien; Cantonese; Hakka	7,608	孫	孙	Sūn
86	Wan	Cantonese	7,498	溫	温	Wēn
86	Wan		7,498	袁		Yuán
87	Tee	Hokkien	7,466	鄭	郑	Zhèng
88	Hui	Cantonese	7,272	許	许	Xǔ
89	Yip	Cantonese	7,220	葉	叶	Yè
90	Woo	Cantonese	7,123	胡		Hú
91	Liang	Mandarin	7,098	梁		Liáng
92	Chung	Cantonese	6,923	鍾	锺	Zhōng
93	Lu	Mandarin	6,910	盧	卢	Lú
93	Lu	Mandarin	6,910	陸	陆	Lù
93	Lu	Mandarin	6,910	路		Lù
94	Soo	Hakka	6,568	蘇	苏	Sū
95	Aw	Hakka; Hokkien	6,381	胡		Hú
95	Aw	Hokkien; Teochew; Cantonese; Hakka	6,381	歐	欧	Ōu
96	Boon	Teochew; Hokkien; Hainanese	6,368	文		Wén
97	Yan	Mandarin	6,355	嚴	严	Yán
97	Yan	Mandarin	6,355	顏	颜	Yán
97	Yan	Cantonese	6,355	甄		Zhēn
98	Zhou	Mandarin	6,265	周		Zhōu
99	Ting	Eastern Min	6,232	陳	陈	Chén
99	Ting		6,232	丁		Dīng
100	Kee	Hokkien; Teochew; Hakka; Hainanese	6,226	紀	纪	Jì
101	Seng	Teochew; Hokkien; Cantonese	6,135	成		Chéng
102	Sun	Mandarin	6,103	孫	孙	Sūn
102	Sun	Cantonese	6,103	辛		Xīn
103	Kwok	Cantonese; Hakka	6,103	郭		Guo
104	Ooi	Hainanese; Hokkien	6,064	黃	黄	Huáng
105	Kim	Hokkien; Teochew; Hakka; Hainanese	6,026	金		Jīn
106	Yew	Hokkien	5,748	楊	杨	Yáng
106	Yew		5,748	于		Yú
106	Yew		5,748	余		Yú
106	Yew		5,748	遊	游	Yóu
107	Su	Mandarin	5,735	蘇	苏	Sū
108	Zheng	Mandarin	5,677	鄭	郑	Zhèng
109	Law	Hakka	5,593	劉	刘	Liú
110	Loke	Cantonese	5,490	陸	陆	Lù
111	Poon	Cantonese	5,418	潘		Pān
112	Chiang	Hainanese	5,406	張	张	Zhāng
112	Chiang		5,406	蔣	蒋	Jiǎng
113	Hu	Mandarin	5,380	胡		Hú
114	Zhao	Mandarin	5,373	趙	赵	Zhào
115	Peng	Mandarin	5,315	彭		Péng
116	Lum	Hokkien; Hakka; Cantonese	5,315	蓝		Lán
116	Lum	Cantonese	5,315	林		Lín
117	Ching	Teochew	5,263	秦		Qín
118	Kwan	Cantonese	5,192	關	关	Guān
119	Ee		5,154	于		Yú
119	Ee	Cantonese	5,154	余		Yú
120	Kwek	Teochew; Hokkien	5,147	郭		Guō
121	Mok	Hainanese; Cantonese; Teochew	5,089	莫		Mò
122	Ngiam	Teochew; Hakka; Hainanese; Eastern Min		嚴	严	Yán
123	Nah	Teochew		藍	蓝	Lán
124	Thia	Hokkien; Teochew		程		Chéng
125	Quah	Hokkien; Teochew		柯		Kē
126	Sng	Teochew; Hokkien		孫	孙	Sūn
127	Eng	Teochew		翁		Wēng

== Thailand ==
The largest Chinese diaspora community in the world are the Chinese Thais (or Sino-Thais), who make up 12–14% of the total Thai population. However, very few Chinese Thais have Chinese surnames, after the 1913 Surname Act that required the adoption of Thai surnames in order to enjoy Thai citizenship. Moreover, the same law requires that those possessing the same surname be related, meaning that immigrant Chinese may not adopt the surname of their clansmen unless they can show actual kinship.

== United States ==
The 2010 US Census found 3,794,673 self-identified Chinese Americans and 230,382 self-identified Taiwanese Americans, up from 2,734,841 Chinese Americans and 144,795 Taiwanese Americans in 2000.

Although the Chinese make up the largest segment of the U.S. Asian and Pacific Islander population, the most common Chinese-derived surname during the 2000 census was not itself Chinese but the Vietnamese Nguyễn (Chinese: 阮, Ruǎn).

During the 2000 census, the 10 most common Chinese American names were: (Note: Other popular Asian & Pacific Islander names are the Vietnamese names Nguyen (#1), Tran (#5), Le (#8), and Pham (#13); the Korean names Kim (#3) and Park (#15); and the Indian names Patel (#4) and Singh (#16).)

Rank		Name	Ethnicity	Total number (2000 census; API only)	Character(s)		Pinyin
Among API	Across all names	Name	Ethnicity	Total number (2000 census; API only)	Trad.	Simp.	Pinyin
2	24	Lee	Chinese	229,200	李		Lǐ
2	24	Lee	Korean	229,200	黎		Lí
6	262	Chen	Chinese	100,700	陳	陈	Chén
7	279	Wong	Chinese (Cantonese)	88,000	王		Wáng
7	279	Wong	Chinese (Cantonese)	88,000	黃	黄	Huáng
7	279	Wong	Chinese (Cantonese)	88,000	汪		Wāng
9	399	Yang	Chinese (Mandarin)	69,000	楊	杨	Yáng
10	440	Wang	Chinese	63,800	王		Wáng
10	440	Wang	Chinese	63,800	汪		Wāng
11	426	Chang	Chinese	62,900	張	张	Zhāng
11	426	Chang	Chinese	62,900	常		Cháng
12	461	Chan	Chinese (Cantonese)	59,800	陳	陈	Chén
14	521	Li	Chinese	55,700	李		Lǐ
14	521	Li	Chinese	55,700	黎		Lí
17	626	Lin	Chinese	47,000	林		Lín
18	652	Liu	Chinese	45,500	劉	刘	Liú
18	652	Liu	Chinese	45,500	廖		Liào

Other surveys
- 2002: study by Matthew Falkenstein, data-mining the 2000 US Census for a particularly Asian & Pacific Islander name list, omitting those like Lee that are common among other ethnicities
- 2000: study by Diane Lauderdale, et al., data-mining Social Security card applications by persons born abroad before 1941 for a particularly Chinese-American name list

== See also ==
- Chinese given name
- Hundred Family Surnames
- Chinese Indonesian surname
- Est. sizes of the 20 largest Chinese families (2006)
- Chinese compound surname
- Surname stroke order
- Lists of common Asian surnames
- Japanese name
- Korean name
- List of Korean surnames
- Vietnamese name
