= Sù (surname 粟) =

Sù (粟) is a Chinese surname. Notable people with the surname include:

- Su Wen (triple jumper) (Chinese: 粟文; born 1999), Chinese track and field athlete
- Su Yu (Chinese: 粟裕; 1907 – 1984) Chinese military commander, general of the People's Liberation Army

== See also ==
- zh:Category:粟姓
