= Chou =

Chou may refer to:

- CHOU (AM), a multicultural radio station (1450 AM) in Montreal, Quebec, in Canada, also known as Middle East Radio
- Chou role, the clown role in Chinese opera
- Chou, a fighter hero in Mobile Legends: Bang Bang

== Chinese surnames ==
- Zhou (surname), romanized as Chou¹ in the Wade–Giles system for Mandarin Chinese, a surname among Han Chinese persons
- Cao (surname), a Chinese surname romanized as "Chou" in some Minnan dialects

== See also ==
- Choux pastry or pâte à choux, a light pastry dough used in many pastries
- Zhou (disambiguation)
- Cho (disambiguation)
- Chūō (disambiguation)
