= Neo (surname) =

Neo is the Hokkien romanisation of the surname Liang (梁).

Neo can also refer to the surname of the following notable people:

- Akira Neo (born 2000), Japanese baseball player
- August Neo (1908–1982), Estonian wrestler
