= Pú (surname) =

Pú (蒲) is a Chinese surname.

== Notable people ==
- Fu Jian (317–355) (Chinese: 苻健; 317–355), originally named Pu Jian (蒲健, name changed 350), courtesy name Jianye (建業), the founding emperor of the Chinese/Di state Former Qin
- Pu Shougeng (c. 1250–1284), Chinese Muslim merchant and administrator
- Pu Songling (蒲松齡), Qing dynasty Chinese writer, best known as the author of Strange Stories from a Chinese Studio
- Pu Hua (蒲華, c. 1834–1911), Qing dynasty landscape painter and calligrapher
- Pu Tze-chun (蒲澤春; born 1956), Taiwanese admiral and scholar
- Mu-ming Poo (born 1948), Chinese-American neuroscientist
  - Ai-jen Poo (蒲艾眞; born 1974), American labor activist, director of the National Domestic Workers Alliance
- Kevin Pu Jun Jin (蒲俊錦; born 1984), Chinese racing driver
- Pu Zhelong (蒲蛰龙; 1912–1997), Chinese entomologist and an academician of the Chinese Academy of
- Pu Tiansheng (or Pu Tian-shen, Chinese: 蒲添生, 1912–1996), Taiwanese sculptor
