= Xiang (surname 項) =

Xiàng (traditional Chinese: 項; simplified Chinese: 项) is a Chinese surname. It is listed 125th in the Song dynasty classic text Hundred Family Surnames.

== Notable people ==
- Xiang Bo (項伯), noble of the Chu state
- Xiang Chong (項充), a fictional character in the novel Water Margin
- Xiang Huaicheng (项怀诚), Chinese economist and former minister of finance of China
- Jing Xiang (项晶), Chinese German actress
- Xiang Liang (項梁), rebel leader in the Qin dynasty
- Xiang Shengmo (項聖謨), Chinese painter in the Ming Dynasty
- Xiang Yu (項羽), prominent warlord in the late Qin dynasty
- Xiang Zhuang (項莊), a younger cousin of Xiang Yu
