= Hundred Family Surnames =

Classic composition of common surnames in China's Song dynasty

Chinese name
- Chinese: 百家姓
- Hanyu Pinyin: Bǎijiā Xìng
Transcriptions
Standard Mandarin
- Hanyu Pinyin: Bǎijiā Xìng
- Bopomofo: ㄅㄞˇ ㄐㄧㄚ ㄒㄧㄥˋ
- Gwoyeu Romatzyh: Baejia Shinq
- Wade–Giles: Pai^{3} Chia^{1} Hsing^{4}
- Yale Romanization: Bǎijyā Syìng
- IPA: [pàɪ.tɕjá ɕîŋ]
Yue: Cantonese
- Yale Romanization: Baakgā Sing
- Jyutping: baak3 gaa1 sing3
Southern Min
- Hokkien POJ: Pah-ka-seⁿ

Vietnamese name
- Vietnamese alphabet: Bách gia tính
- Chữ Hán: 百家姓

Korean name
- Hangul: 백가성
- Hanja: 百家姓
Transcriptions
- Revised Romanization: Baekgaseong

Japanese name
- Kanji: 百家姓
- Kana: ひゃっかせい
Transcriptions
- Romanization: Hyakkasei

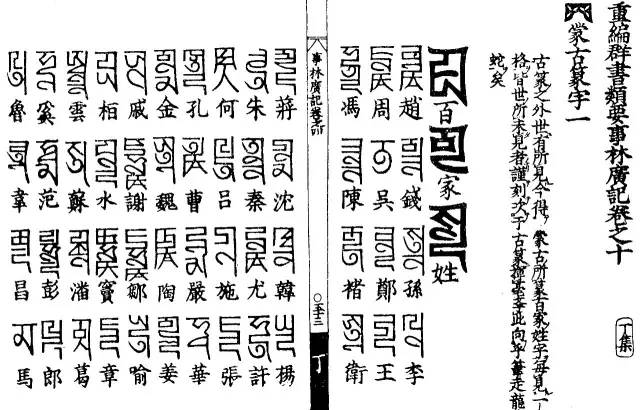
Hundred Family Surnames written in Chinese characters and Phagspa script, from Shilin Guangji written by Chen Yuanjing in the Yuan dynasty

The Hundred Family Surnames (Chinese: 百家姓), commonly known as Bai Jia Xing, also translated as Hundreds of Chinese Surnames, is a classic Chinese text composed of common Chinese surnames. An unknown author compiled the book during the Song dynasty (960–1279). The book lists 504 surnames. Of these, 444 are single-character surnames and 60 are double-character surnames. About 800 names have been derived from the original ones.

In the dynasties following the Song, the 13th-century Three Character Classic, the Hundred Family Surnames, and the 6th-century Thousand Character Classic came to be known as San Bai Qian (Three, Hundred, Thousand), from the first character in their titles. They served as instructional books for children, becoming the almost universal introductory literary texts for students (almost exclusively boys) from elite backgrounds and even for a number of ordinary villagers. Each text was available in many versions, printed cheaply and available to all since they did not become superseded. When a student had memorized all three, he had a knowledge of roughly 2,000 characters. Since Chinese did not use an alphabet, this was an effective, though time-consuming, way of studying character-recognition before going on to understanding texts and writing characters.

== Form ==
The work is a rhyming poem in lines of eight characters. The surnames are not listed in order of commonality. According to Song dynasty scholar Wang Mingqing (王明清), the first four surnames listed represent the most important families in the empire at the time, particularly in the Jiangnan Region:

- 1st: Zhao (趙) is the surname of the Song dynasty emperors.
- 2nd: Qian (錢) is the surname of the kings of Wuyue.
- 3rd: Sun (孫) is the surname of the queen Sun Taizhen of Wuyue king Qian Chu.
- 4th: Li (李) is the surname of the kings of Southern Tang.

The next four, Zhou 周, Wu 吳, Zheng 鄭, and Wang 王, were the surnames of the other wives of Qian Chu, the last king of Wuyue.

== Complete text ==
This text is written in Traditional Chinese. Note that several of these characters may link to the same article.

- 趙(Zhao)
- 錢(Qian)
- 孫(Sun)
- 李(Li)
- 周(Zhou)
- 吳(Wu)
- 鄭(Zheng)
- 王(Wang)
- 馮(Feng)
- 陳(Chen)
- 褚(Chu)
- 衛(Wei)
- 蔣(Jiang)
- 沈(Shen)
- 韓(Han)
- 楊(Yang)
- 朱(Zhu)
- 秦(Qin)
- 尤(You)
- 許(Xu)
- 何(He)
- 呂(Lü)
- 施(Shi)
- 張(Zhang)
- 孔(Kong)
- 曹(Cao)
- 嚴(Yan)
- 華(Hua)
- 金(Jin)
- 魏(Wei)
- 陶(Tao)
- 姜(Jiang)
- 戚(Qi)
- 謝(Xie)
- 鄒(Zou)
- 喻(Yu)
- 柏(Bai)
- 水(Shui)
- 竇(Dou)
- 章(Zhang)
- 雲(Yun)
- 蘇(Su)
- 潘(Pan)
- 葛(Ge)
- 奚(Xi)
- 范(Fan)
- 彭(Peng)
- 郎(Lang)
- 魯(Lu)
- 韋(Wei)
- 昌(Chang)
- 馬(Ma)
- 苗(Miao)
- 鳳(Feng)
- 花(Hua)
- 方(Fang)
- 俞(Yu)
- 任(Ren)
- 袁(Yuan)
- 柳(Liu)
- 酆(Feng)
- 鮑(Bao)
- 史(Shi)
- 唐(Tang)
- 費(Fei)
- 廉(Lian)
- 岑(Cen)
- 薛(Xue)
- 雷(Lei)
- 賀(He)
- 倪(Ni)
- 湯(Tang)
- 滕(Teng)
- 殷(Yin)
- 羅(Luo)
- 畢(Bi)
- 郝(Hao)
- 鄔(Wu)
- 安(An)
- 常(Chang)
- 樂(Yue)
- 于(Yu)
- 時(Shi)
- 傅(Fu)
- 皮(Pi)
- 卞(Bian)
- 齊(Qi)
- 康(Kang)
- 伍(Wu)
- 余(Yu)
- 元(Yuan)
- 卜(Bu)
- 顧(Gu)
- 孟(Meng)
- 平(Ping)
- 黃(Huang)
- 和(He)
- 穆(Mu)
- 蕭(Xiao)
- 尹(Yin)
- 姚(Yao)
- 邵(Shao)
- 湛(Zhan)
- 汪(Wang)
- 祁(Qi)
- 毛(Mao)
- 禹(Yu)
- 狄(Di)
- 米(Mi)
- 貝(Bei)
- 明(Ming)
- 臧(Zang)
- 計(Ji)
- 伏(Fu)
- 成(Cheng)
- 戴(Dai)
- 談(Tan)
- 宋(Song)
- 茅(Mao)
- 龐(Pang)
- 熊(Xiong)
- 紀(Ji)
- 舒(Shu)
- 屈(Qu)
- 項(Xiang)
- 祝(Zhu)
- 董(Dong)
- 梁(Liang)
- 杜(Du)
- 阮(Ruan)
- 藍(Lan)
- 閔(Min)
- 席(Xi)
- 季(Ji)
- 麻(Ma)
- 強(Qiang)
- 賈(Jia)
- 路(Lu)
- 婁(Lou)
- 危(Wei)
- 江(Jiang)
- 童(Tong)
- 顏(Yan)
- 郭(Guo)
- 梅(Mei)
- 盛(Sheng)
- 林(Lin)
- 刁(Diao)
- 鍾(Zhong)
- 徐(Xu)
- 邱(Qiu)
- 駱(Luo)
- 高(Gao)
- 夏(Xia)
- 蔡(Cai)
- 田(Tian)
- 樊(Fan)
- 胡(Hu)
- 凌(Ling)
- 霍(Huo)
- 虞(Yu)
- 萬(Wan)
- 支(Zhi)
- 柯(Ke)
- 昝(Zan)
- 管(Guan)
- 盧(Lu)
- 莫(Mo)
- 經(Jing)
- 房(Fang)
- 裘(Qiu)
- 繆(Miao)
- 干(Gan)
- 解(Xie)
- 應(Ying)
- 宗(Zong)
- 丁(Ding)
- 宣(Xuan)
- 賁(Ben)
- 鄧(Deng)
- 郁(Yu)
- 單(Shan)
- 杭(Hang)
- 洪(Hong)
- 包(Bao)
- 諸(Zhu)
- 左(Zuo)
- 石(Shi)
- 崔(Cui)
- 吉(Ji)
- 鈕(Niu)
- 龔(Gong)
- 程(Cheng)
- 嵇(Ji)
- 邢(Xing)
- 滑(Hua)
- 裴(Pei)
- 陸(Lu)
- 榮(Rong)
- 翁(Weng)
- 荀(Xun)
- 羊(Yang)
- 於(Yu)
- 惠(Hui)
- 甄(Zhen)
- 麴(Qu)
- 家(Jia)
- 封(Feng)
- 芮(Rui)
- 羿(Yi)
- 儲(Chu)
- 靳(Jin)
- 汲(Ji)
- 邴(Bing)
- 糜(Mi)
- 松(Song)
- 井(Jing)
- 段(Duan)
- 富(Fu)
- 巫(Wu)
- 烏(Wu)
- 焦(Jiao)
- 巴(Ba)
- 弓(Gong)
- 牧(Mu)
- 隗(Kui)
- 山(Shan)
- 谷(Gu)
- 車(Che)
- 侯(Hou)
- 宓(Mi)
- 蓬(Peng)
- 全(Quan)
- 郗(Xi)
- 班(Ban)
- 仰(Yang)
- 秋(Qiu)
- 仲(Zhong)
- 伊(Yi)
- 宮(Gong)
- 寧(Ning)
- 仇(Qiu)
- 欒(Luan)
- 暴(Bao)
- 甘(Gan)
- 鈄(Tou)
- 厲(Li)
- 戎(Rong)
- 祖(Zu)
- 武(Wu)
- 符(Fu)
- 劉(Liu)
- 景(Jing)
- 詹(Zhan)
- 束(Shu)
- 龍(Long)
- 葉(Ye)
- 幸(Xing)
- 司(Si)
- 韶(Shao)
- 郜(Gao)
- 黎(Li)
- 薊(Ji)
- 薄(Bo)
- 印(Yin)
- 宿(Su)
- 白(Bai)
- 懷(Huai)
- 蒲(Pu)
- 邰(Tai)
- 從(Cong)
- 鄂(E)
- 索(Suo)
- 咸(Xian)
- 籍(Ji)
- 賴(Lai)
- 卓(Zhuo)
- 藺(Lin)
- 屠(Tu)
- 蒙(Meng)
- 池(Chi)
- 喬(Qiao)
- 陰(Yin)
- 鬱(Yu)
- 胥(Xu)
- 能(Nai)
- 蒼(Cang)
- 雙(Shuang)
- 聞(Wen)
- 莘(Shen)
- 黨(Dang)
- 翟(Zhai)
- 譚(Tan)
- 貢(Gong)
- 勞(Lao)
- 逄(Pang)
- 姬(Ji)
- 申(Shen)
- 扶(Fu)
- 堵(Du)
- 冉(Ran)
- 宰(Zai)
- 酈(Li)
- 雍(Yong)
- 郤(Xi)
- 璩(Qu)
- 桑(Sang)
- 桂(Gui)
- 濮(Pu)
- 牛(Niu)
- 壽(Shou)
- 通(Tong)
- 邊(Bian)
- 扈(Hu)
- 燕(Yan)
- 冀(Ji)
- 郟(Jia)
- 浦(Pu)
- 尚(Shang)
- 農(Nong)
- 溫(Wen)
- 別(Bie)
- 莊(Zhuang)
- 晏(Yan)
- 柴(Chai)
- 瞿(Qu)
- 閻(Yan)
- 充(Chong)
- 慕(Mu)
- 連(Lian)
- 茹(Ru)
- 習(Xi)
- 宦(Huan)
- 艾(Ai)
- 魚(Yu)
- 容(Rong)
- 向(Xiang)
- 古(Gu)
- 易(Yi)
- 慎(Shen)
- 戈(Ge)
- 廖(Liao)
- 庾(Yu)
- 終(Zhong)
- 暨(Ji)
- 居(Ju)
- 衡(Heng)
- 步(Bu)
- 都(Du)
- 耿(Geng)
- 滿(Man)
- 弘(Hong)
- 匡(Kuang)
- 國(Guo)
- 文(Wen)
- 寇(Kou)
- 廣(Guang)
- 祿(Lu)
- 闕(Que)
- 東(Dong)
- 歐(Ou)
- 殳(Shu)
- 沃(Wo)
- 利(Li)
- 蔚(Wei)
- 越(Yue)
- 夔(Kui)
- 隆(Long)
- 師(Shi)
- 鞏(Gong)
- 厙(She)
- 聶(Nie)
- 晁(Chao)
- 勾(Gou)
- 敖(Ao)
- 融(Rong)
- 冷(Leng)
- 訾(Zi)
- 辛(Xin)
- 闞(Kan)
- 那(Na)
- 簡(Jian)
- 饒(Rao)
- 空(Kong)
- 曾(Zeng)
- 毋(Wu)
- 沙(Sha)
- 乜(Nie)
- 養(Yang)
- 鞠(Ju)
- 須(Xu)
- 豐(Feng)
- 巢(Chao)
- 關(Guan)
- 蒯(Kuai)
- 相(Xiang)
- 查(Zha)
- 后(Hou)
- 荊(Jing)
- 紅(Hong)
- 游(You)
- 竺(Zhu)
- 權(Quan)
- 逯(Lu)
- 蓋(Ge)
- 益(Yi)
- 桓(Huan)
- 公(Gong)
- 万俟(Moqi)
- 司馬(Sima)
- 上官(Shangguan)
- 歐陽(Ouyang)
- 夏侯(Xiahou)
- 諸葛(Zhuge)
- 聞人(Wenren)
- 東方(Dongfang)
- 赫連(Helian)
- 皇甫(Huangfu)
- 尉遲(Yuchi)
- 公羊(Gongyang)
- 澹臺(Tantai)
- 公冶(Gongye)
- 宗政(Zongzheng)
- 濮陽(Puyang)
- 淳于(Chunyu)
- 單于(Chanyu)
- 太叔(Taishu)
- 申屠(Shentu)
- 公孫(Gongsun)
- 仲孫(Zhongsun)
- 軒轅(Xuanyuan)
- 令狐(Linghu)
- 鐘離(Zhongli)
- 宇文(Yuwen)
- 長孫(Zhangsun)
- 慕容(Murong)
- 鮮于(Xianyu)
- 閭丘(Lüqiu)
- 司徒(Situ)
- 司空(Sikong)
- 亓官(Qiguan)
- 司寇(Sikou)
- 仉(Zhang)
- 督(Du)
- 子車(Ziju)
- 顓孫(Zhuansun)
- 端木(Duanmu)
- 巫馬(Wuma)
- 公西(Gongxi)
- 漆雕(Qidiao)
- 樂正(Yuezheng)
- 壤駟(Rangsi)
- 公良(Gongliang)
- 拓跋(Tuoba)
- 夾谷(Jiagu)
- 宰父(Zaifu)
- 穀粱(Guliang)
- 晉(Jin)
- 楚(Chu)
- 閆(Yan)
- 法(Fa)
- 汝(Ru)
- 鄢(Yan)
- 涂(Tu)
- 欽(Qin)
- 段干(Duangan)
- 百里(Baili)
- 東郭(Dongguo)
- 南門(Nanmen)
- 呼延(Huyan)
- 歸(Gui)
- 海(Hai)
- 羊舌(Yangshe)
- 微生(Weisheng)
- 岳(Yue)
- 帥(Shuai)
- 緱(Gou)
- 亢(Kang)
- 況(Kuang)
- 後(Hou)
- 有(You)
- 琴(Qin)
- 梁丘(Liangqiu)
- 左丘(Zuoqiu)
- 東門(Dongmen)
- 西門(Ximen)
- 商(Shang)
- 牟(Mou)
- 佘(She)
- 佴(Nai)
- 伯(Bo)
- 賞(Shang)
- 南宮(Nangong)
- 墨(Mo)
- 哈(Ha)
- 譙(Qiao)
- 笪(Da)
- 年(Nian)
- 愛(Ai)
- 陽(Yang)
- 佟(Tong)
- 第五(Diwu)
- 言(Yan)
- 福(Fu)
- 百家姓(Bǎijiāxìng)
- 終(zhōng) (Note: The last four-character line means "thus ends the Hundred Family Surnames." It is not intended to contain surnames.)

== Prevalence in modern times ==
In 2013 the Fuxi Institution compiled a ranking of the 400 most common surnames in China.

=== Under 300th most common ===
According to the study, the following surnames from the Hundred Family Surnames are not among the 300 most common surnames:

- Yōng 雍 – 339th
- Píng 平 – 315th
- Mǐ 米 – 316th
- Zhàn 湛 – 369th

=== Under 400th most common ===
According to the study, the following surnames from the Hundred Family Surnames are not among the 400 most common surnames:

- Bèi (贝; 貝)
- Shuǐ (水)
- Wū (邬; 鄔)
- Háng (杭)
- Zhú (竺)
- Bǐng (邴)
- Fú (扶)
- Dǔ (堵)
- Zǎi (宰)
- Lì (郦; 酈)
- Xì (郤)
- Pú (濮)
- Shòu (寿; 壽)
- Tōng (通)
- Jia (郏; 郟)
- Bié (别; 別)
- Chōng (充)
- Xí (习/習)
- Hóng (红; 紅)
- Huàn (宦)
- Ài (艾)
- Shèn (慎)
- Yǔ (庾)
- Zhōng (终; 終)
- Jì (暨)
- Bù (步)
- Hóng (弘)
- Lù (禄; 祿)
- Shū (殳)
- Wò (沃)
- Wèi (蔚)
- Yuè (越)
- Kuí (夔)
- Mù (牧)
- Shè (厍; 厙)
- Zī (訾)
- Kōng (空)
- Kuí (隗)
- Shān (山)
- Wú (毋)
- Niè (乜)
- Yang (养; 養)
- Xū (须; 須)
- Xún (荀)
- Sháo (韶)
- Bēn (贲; 賁)
- Every two syllable name (except for Ōuyáng (欧阳; 歐陽))

== See also ==
- Chinese surnames
- List of common Chinese surnames
- Seek for Surname History
- Three Character Classic
- Thousand Character Classic
