= Yin =

Yin often refers to dark force in the yin and yang from traditional Chinese philosophy and medicine.

Yin or YIN may also refer to:

== Surnames ==
- Yīn (surname) (殷), a Chinese surname
- Yīn (surname 陰), a Chinese surname
- Yǐn (surname) (尹), a Chinese surname
- Yìn (surname) (印), a Chinese surname

== Kingdoms ==
- Shang dynasty, also known as the Yin dynasty
  - Yinxu or Yin, the Shang dynasty capital now in ruins
- Yin (Five Dynasties period), a short-lived kingdom during China's Five Dynasties and Ten Kingdoms period

== Other uses ==
- Yin Mountains, a mountain range in Inner Mongolia and Hebei province in China
- Yin (尹, yǐn), an office of early China sometimes equivalent to prime minister and sometimes to governor
  - Prime minister (Chu State), known in Chinese as Lingyin.
- YIN, the IATA code for Yining Airport, Xinjiang, China
- Yin (Darker than Black), fictional character in the anime series Darker than Black
