= Foimo =

Manchu clan and family name

Manchu name
- Manchu script: ᠣᡳ᠌ᠮᠣ

Chinese name
- Chinese: 费莫氏
Transcriptions
Standard Mandarin
- Hanyu Pinyin: fèi mò shì

Pronunciation respelling name
- Pronunciation respelling: FOH-i-moh

Foimo is a Manchu clan and family name recorded as one of the Eight Great Manchu noble clans in some version of historical documents.

== Overview ==
The clan traces its origins to the Peiman clan (裴滿氏) of the Jurchen Jin dynasty, itself descended from one of the thirty major Jurchen surnames recorded during the late Tang period. According to tradition, the founder of the Magiya clan, Mamudun, was the brother of Genteyi, the earliest traceable ancestor of the Foimo clan, making the Magiya clan a branch of the Foimo. Therefore, tradition stating that members of the Magiya, Fuca, and Foimo should not intermarry due to the same paternal ancestry.

By the late Ming and early Qing periods, Foimo families were dispersed across Feiyou, Burhatu, the Changbai Mountains, Hoifa, Warka, Ningguta, and other regions in Manchuria, gradually joined the founding of Later Jin by Nurhaci. Following the fall of the Qing dynasty, members of the clan commonly adopted Chinese surnames such as Ma (surname) (馬), Ma (麻), Fei (費), Pei (裴), Chen (陳), Fu (傅), and Liu (劉).

Several prominent Foimo lineages emerged during the Qing dynasty. Descendants of Nanjilan of the Plain Red Banner produced notable officials including Unda (Manchu: ᡠᠨ᠋ᡩ᠋ᠠ, romanized: Unda) and his grandson Leboo (Manchu: ᠯᡝᠪᠣᠣ, romanized: Leboo), who both served the court as Grand Secretaries. Leboo further distinguished himself in the suppression of the Miao and White Lotus Rebellion and was posthumously honored as a Marquis First Class (一等侯爵).

The descendants of other families were recorded of holding minor hereditary titles and achieved distinction in campaigns against the Ming, the Dzungars, and other enemies of the Qing, serving as imperial guards, banner officers, and commanders.
