= Heng (surname) =

As a surname, Heng may refer to:

- Teochew romanization of the Chinese surname written 王 (Wáng in Hanyu Pinyin)
- Hokkien romanization of the Chinese surname written 邢 (Xíng in Hanyu Pinyin)
- pinyin romanization of the less-common Chinese surname written 橫 in traditional characters or 横 in simplified characters (also Héng)

== Distribution ==
Heng is mostly identified as a Teochew-romanized Chinese surname written 王 (Wáng in Hanyu Pinyin) in Singapore and Malaysia. The Chinese surname was listed 8th on the famous Song dynasty list of the Hundred Family Surnames and is the most common surname in mainland China.

However, Heng is an uncommon surname in the United States (ranked 13,044th during the 1990 census and 10,281st during the year 2000 census).

== Notable people ==
=== 王 ===
- Heng Swee Keat (born 1961), Singaporean politician and Deputy Prime Minister
- Heng Kim Song (born 1963), Singaporean editorial cartoonist
- Ivan Heng (born 1963), Singaporean actor
- Heng Chee How (born 1961), Singaporean politician
- Amanda Heng (born 1951), Singaporean artist

=== 邢 ===
- Margaret Heng (born 1961), Singaporean businesswoman
- Nadia Heng (born 1985), Malaysian beauty pageant titleholder and model
