= Ji (surname 汲) =

Chinese family name

Ji (汲)
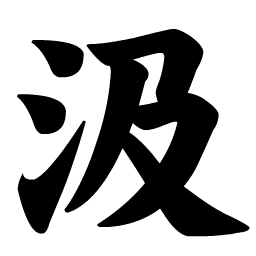
- Pronunciation: Jí (Mandarin); Kap (Cantonese)
- Language: Chinese

Origin
- Language: Old Chinese

Other names
- Variant forms: Chi, Kap

Jí is the Mandarin pinyin romanization of the Chinese surname written 汲 in Chinese character. It is romanized as Chi in Wade–Giles, and Kap in Cantonese. Ji is listed 213th in the Song dynasty classic text Hundred Family Surnames. It is not among the 300 most common surnames in China.

== Origins ==
There are two main sources of the Ji 汲 surname:

1. From the state of Wey. According to the Song dynasty text Lushi, during the Spring and Autumn period, Crown Prince Ji (太子伋), the son of Duke Xuan of Wey, lived in the settlement of Ji 汲, and his descendants adopted the place name as their surname.

2. From the state of Qi. According to the Han dynasty text Fengsu Tongyi, during the Spring and Autumn period, a son or grandson of Duke Xuan of Qi (reigned 455–405 BC) was enfeoffed at the settlement of Ji 汲, and his descendants adopted Ji as their surname.

== Meanings of the character from Ancient Text ==
1. Draw water from a well.

2. Describe a feeling of urgency, hard pursuit.

3. Family name.

== Notable people ==
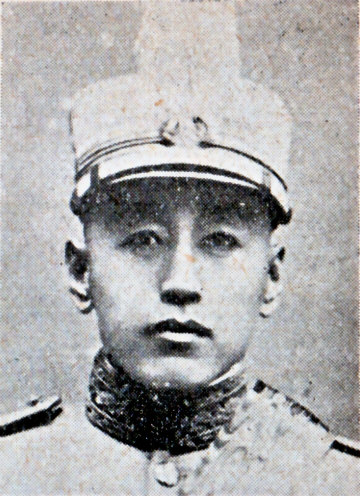
General Ji Jinchun

- Ji An (汲黯; died 112 BC), Western Han official known for his integrity
- Ji Sang (汲桑; died 308), rebel of the Western Jin dynasty
- Ji Gu (汲固), Northern Wei official serving under Emperor Xiaowen
- Ji Jinchun (汲金純; 1877–1948), Republic of China general, governor of Rehe and Suiyuan provinces
- Ji Binchang (汲斌昌; born 1963), former Chinese executive and politician
- Ji Yansong (Chinese: 汲岩松; pinyin: Jí Yánsōng; born 1989) Chinese male curler and curling coach
