= Leng =

Leng may refer to:

- Leng (surname) (冷), a Chinese surname
- Leng (plateau), a fictional plateau
