= Yi (surname 羿) =

Yi is the Mandarin pinyin romanization of the Chinese surname written 羿 in Chinese characters, named after historical figure Hou Yi (not the similarly named and related mythological figure). It is romanized I in Wade–Giles. Yi is listed 210th in the Song dynasty classic text Hundred Family Surnames. It is not among the 300 most common surnames in China in the present, with a noticeable lack of notable people compared to other surnames in the text.

== Notable people ==
- Yi Hanqing (born 1935), ethnic Mongol Chinese Communist Party member and politician
- Yi Zhong (1368–1398), chief magistrate of Suining

== See also ==
- Yi (surname 易)
- Yi (surname 伊)
