= Chu (Chinese surname) =

Pinyin romanization of several different Chinese surnames

The character "楚" (pronounced Chǔ in Mandarin) written in small seal script (top), and in regular script (bottom)

Chu is the pinyin romanization of several different Chinese surnames, which including 楚 Chǔ, 儲/储 Chǔ, 褚 Chǔ, 觸/触 Chù, etc. In the Wade–Giles romanization system, Chu is also a transliteration for 朱 (Zhu in Hanyu Pinyin), and it can also refer to several Chinese family names. In Hong Kong and Macau, this is also the spelling for the surnames 朱, 諸, 儲, 褚, among others. In Taiwan, the last name Chu is also used to refer to 朱 (Zhu in pinyin), 曲 (Qu in pinyin), 祝 (Zhù in Pinyin), etc.

== Notable people named Chu ==
=== 楚 Chǔ ===
The name is transliterated as Sở in Vietnamese. Some people think this surname originated from Viscount Xiong Yi, the founder of Chu State in Western Zhou dynasty. After Qin conquered Chu, the royal family of Chu took their countries’ name as their surname.

- Chu Liuxiang, fictional protagonist of Gu Long's Chu Liuxiang Series
- Chu Qing (1923–2016), politician
- Arthur Chu, Taiwanese American columnist and former Jeopardy! contestant

=== 儲/储 Chǔ ===
11th on the Hundred Family Surnames.

- Chu Anping, scholar and liberal journalist in the 20th century
- Chu Bo (born 1944), politician
- Chu Feng (born 1965), computer scientist
- Chu Feng, known as Frances Yao, mathematician and computer scientist
- Chu Guangxi (706–760), poet
- Chu Yun (born 1977), conceptual artist

=== 褚 Chǔ ===
It is the 11th name on the Hundred Family Surnames poem.

- Chu Suiliang, politician and calligrapher in Tang Dynasty
- Chu Shijian (1928–2019), businessman
- Chu Yupu (Chinese: 褚玉璞; 1887–1929) Chinese general who served under Yuan Shikai and later Zhang Zongchang

== See also ==
- Zhu
