= Dōng =

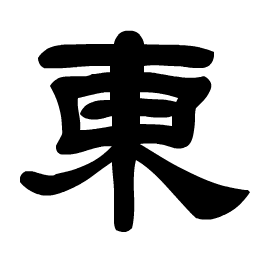
- Romanization: Vietnamese: Đồng, Đông
- Pronunciation: Dōng ([tʊ́ŋ]) (Mandarin)

Origin
- Origin: Dongfang
- Meaning: "East"
- Region of origin: China

Dōng (simplified Chinese: 东; traditional Chinese: 東; pinyin: Dōng "East") is a Chinese surname. Its Vietnamese form is Đồng, Đông. It is listed 360th on the Hundred Family Surnames poem.

An origin of Dong is the simplification of the surname Dongfang, which originates from Fu Xi. During the middle Zhou dynasty, Dongguan (東關) the Ji (姬) family reduce surname to Dong (東) in Jin (晉國). Donghu people (東胡) people get surname Dong (東) with tribe name.

== Notable people ==
- Dong Feng (weightlifter) (东峰; born 1980), Chinese weightlifter
- Dong Hang (东航; born 1993), Chinese footballer
- Dong Mei (东梅; born 1967), Chinese architect

== See also ==
- Dǒng or Tung, a surname
- Dong
