= Bie =

Bie or BIE may refer to:

- Bie, Sweden, a village in Södermanland County
- Bié Plateau, a highland region in Angola
- Bié Province in Angola
- Bie (surname), a Chinese surname
- Beijing Institute of Education, a university in China
- Bureau International des Expositions, the intergovernmental organisation that supervises international exhibitions
- Bienheuré (Saint Bié), a semi-legendary saint of Vendôme
- Bureau of Indian Education, a bureau within the US government
- Black Identity Extremists, a designation coined by the FBI
- Trionychidae (Chinese: 鳖; pinyin: biē), softshell turtles
- Theta Coronae Australis, a star also named Bie

== People with the surname ==
- Amadeus de Bie (1844–1920), Belgian abbot
- Oskar Bie (1864–1938), German art historian
- Bie Tingfang (1883–1940), Chinese general
- Ferdinand Bie (1888–1961), Norwegian track and field athlete
- Källa Bie (born 1974), Swedish actress
- Bie Ge (born 1992), Chinese sprinter
