= QU =

QU, Qu or qu may refer to:

== Arts and media ==
- QU (album), an album by the American band Sherwood
- Qu (poetry), a Chinese type of sung poetry
- A race of gourmands from the Square Enix console role-playing game Final Fantasy IX
- An alien species in C. M. Kosemen's science fiction novel All Tomorrows
- A member of the History Monks in Terry Pratchett's Discworld novels

== People ==
- Qu (surname 屈), Chinese surname
- Qu (surname 瞿), Chinese surname
- Qu (surname 曲), Chinese surname

== Schools ==
- Qarshi University, Lahore, Pakistan
- Qassim University, Qassim, Saudi Arabia
- Qatar University, Doha, Qatar
- Queensland University, Brisbane, Queensland, Australia
- Queen's University at Kingston, Ontario, Canada
- Quincy University, Quincy, Illinois, United States
- Quinnipiac University, Hamden, Connecticut, United States

== Other uses ==
- List of English words containing Q not followed by U
- The Latin name for the Roman script letter Q;
- Qu (digraph), a digraph used in several languages;
- Qu County, county in Sichuan, China;
- Qū (曲/麹/麴), fermentation starters used in East Asia in the production of traditional Chinese alcoholic beverages;
- District (PRC and ROC) in the People's Republic of China and the Republic of China;
- Myrocarpus frondosus, a plant;
- Quechua languages, a group of Native American languages of South America (ISO 639-1 code "qu").
