= U of Q =

U of Q may refer to:

- Université du Québec, a system of ten provincially run public universities in Quebec, Canada
- University of Queensland, a public university located in Brisbane, Australia

== See also ==
- UQ (disambiguation)
