= Feng (surname 酆) =

Chinese family name

Fēng (酆) is the 61st name in the Hundred Family Surnames poem. It is derived from the place-name Feng (酆), the name of a fief (in present-day Huyi District, Shanxi province) granted to the 17th son of the virtuous King Wen of Zhou.

== Notable people ==
- Feng Hai (born 1407), politician of the Ming dynasty
- Feng Shu (died 594 BCE), politician of the Spring and Autumn Period
- Feng Ti (1903–1938), soldier
- Feng Yixiang (1536–1570), politician of the Ming dynasty
- Feng Yueshou (17th century), politician of the late Ming and early Qing dynasty
- Feng Yunhe (c. 1898–1988), Chinese government official and politician
