= Ji (surname 计) =

Ji (计/計)
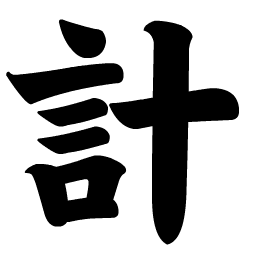
- Pronunciation: Jì (Mandarin); Gai (Cantonese)
- Language: Chinese

Origin
- Language: Old Chinese

Other names
- Variant forms: Chi, Kai, Gai

Jì is the Mandarin pinyin romanization of the Chinese surname written 计 in simplified Chinese and 計 in traditional Chinese. It is romanized as Chi in Wade–Giles, and Kai or Gai in Cantonese. Ji is listed 113th in the Song dynasty classic text Hundred Family Surnames. Relatively uncommon, it is not among the top 300 surnames in China. A 2013 study found it was the 316th-most common surname, being shared by 165,0000 people or 0.012% of the population, with the province with the most being Anhui.

== Origins ==
According to the Song dynasty text Lushi, a lineage that descended from Yu the Great was enfeoffed at Ji 计, and adopted it as their surname.

According to the Qing dynasty genealogy text Xingshi Kaolue (姓氏考略), another source of the Ji surname was the Zhou dynasty Dongyi state of Ju, whose capital was at Jijin (计斤, in present-day Jiaozhou, Shandong). Some citizens of Jijin adopted Ji as their surname.

== Notable people ==
- Ji Ran (計然), Spring and Autumn period scholar of the state of Yue
- Ji Yougong (計有功; fl. 12th century), Song dynasty scholar and official
- Ji Sheng (計盛; 15th century), Ming dynasty painter
- Ji Cheng (計成; 1582 – c. 1642), Ming dynasty garden designer
- Ji Liuqi (計六奇; 1622 – ?), Ming and Qing dynasty historian
- Ji Zhiwen (计志文; 1901–1985), Christian leader, founder of the Evangelize China Fellowship
- Ji Chunhua (计春华; born 1961), film actor
- Ji Cheng (计成; born 1987), first Chinese cyclist to race in a Grand Tour
- Yusheng Ji (計 宇生), Japanese electrical engineer
