= Lu (surname 逯) =

Chinese family name

Lù (逯)
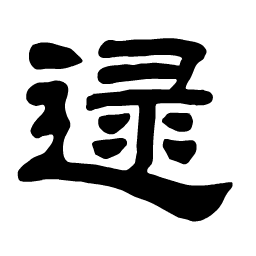
- Pronunciation: Lù (Mandarin); Luk (Cantonese)
- Language: Chinese

Origin
- Language: Old Chinese

Lu (Chinese: 逯; pinyin: Lù) is a Chinese surname. It is also spelled Luk according to the Cantonese pronunciation. Lu 逯 is listed 404th in the Song dynasty classic text Hundred Family Surnames. Relatively uncommon, Lu 逯 is the 356th most common surname in China, being shared by 121,000 people, with the province with the greatest number of people being Shandong.

== Origins ==
According to the second-century Eastern Han dynasty text Fengsu Tongyi, Lu 逯 was a place name in the State of Qin of the Eastern Zhou dynasty, in modern Shaanxi province. An official of Qin was enfeoffed at Lu, and his descendants adopted Lu as their surname.

According to the Song dynasty text Lushi, another origin of the Lu 逯 surname is the State of Chu, also of the Eastern Zhou dynasty. A kinsman of the king of Chu was enfeoffed at the settlement of Lu, and his descendants adopted Lu as their surname. This lineage of Lu is a branch of the Chu royal surname Mi.

== Notable people ==
- Lu Pu (逯普), Han dynasty nobleman, Marquis of Mengxiang
- Lu Bing (逯并), Xin dynasty marshall
- Lu Luzeng (逯鲁曾, died 1352), high-ranking Yuan dynasty government official
- Lu Qinli (逯钦立, 1911–1973), paleographer
- Lu Yaodong (逯耀東, 1933–2006), historian and professor of National Taiwan University
- Max Lu or Lu Gaoqing (逯高清; born 1963), nanotechnologist, Vice-Chancellor of the University of Surrey
- Lu Jiajing (逯佳境; born 1989), tennis player
- Lu Jiaxiang (逯佳翔; born 1989), tennis player, twin sister of Lu Jiajing
