= UQ (disambiguation) =

UQ is the University of Queensland, a public research university in Queensland, Australia.

UQ may also refer to:

- Urumqi Airlines (IATA code UQ)
- Ubiquinone, or coenzyme Q
- Uncertainty quantification
- Universal Queue, a concept in contact center design
- Université du Québec, the public university system in Quebec, Canada
- Universities Quarterly, now renamed Higher Education Quarterly, a journal published by the Society for Research into Higher Education

== See also ==
- QU (disambiguation)
