= Ji (surname 蓟) =

Chinese family name

Ji (蓟/薊)
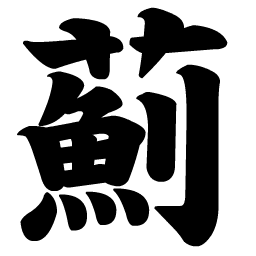
- Pronunciation: Jì (Mandarin); Gai (Cantonese)
- Language: Chinese

Origin
- Language: Old Chinese
- Origin: State of Ji

Other names
- Variant forms: Chi, Gai, Kai

Jì is the Mandarin pinyin romanization of the Chinese surname written 蓟 in simplified Chinese and 薊 in traditional Chinese. It is romanized as Chi in Wade–Giles and Gai or Kai in Cantonese. Ji is listed 263rd in the Song dynasty classic text Hundred Family Surnames. It is not among the 300 most common surnames in China.

== Origin ==
The Ji 蓟 surname originated from the state of Ji 蓟. According to tradition, after King Wu of Zhou conquered the Shang dynasty in 1046/45 BC, he enfeoffed a descendant of the Yellow Emperor at the settlement of Ji, in modern Beijing municipality. Ji was conquered by the neighbouring state of Yan in the 7th century BC, and the people of Ji adopted the name of their former state as their surname.

The most prominent clan (junwang, 郡望) of the Ji surname in history is that of the Neihuang Commandery, in modern Henan province.

== Notable people ==
- Ji Zixun (蓟子训), Eastern Han dynasty Taoist who became revered as an immortal
