= Chang (surname 昌) =

Chinese family name

Chāng is the 51st name on the Hundred Family Surnames poem. It is not in the top 400-most common surnames in 2013. it is said to be from the name of Changyi, son of the legendary Yellow Emperor.
