= Zu (surname) =

Zu (祖)
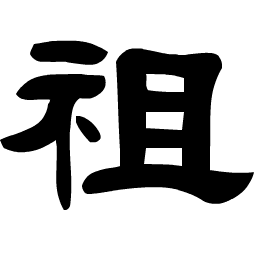
- Pronunciation: Zǔ (Mandarin)
- Language: Chinese

Origin
- Language: Old Chinese

Other names
- Variant form: Tsu

Zu is the Mandarin pinyin romanization of the Chinese surname written 祖 in Chinese character. It is romanized Tsu in Wade–Giles. It is listed 249th in the Song dynasty classic text Hundred Family Surnames. It is not among the 300 most common surnames in China.

== Notable people ==
- Zu Ti (祖逖; 266–321), celebrated Eastern Jin general
- Zu Yue (祖約; died 330), Eastern Jin general, younger brother of Zu Ti
- Zu Chongzhi (429–500), Liu Song dynasty mathematician and astronomer
- Zu Gengzhi (450? – 520?), mathematician, son of Zu Chongzhi
- Zu Ting (6th century), scholar-official of the Northern Qi dynasty
- Zu Xiaosun (6th – 7th century), Sui and Tang dynasty musician
- Zu Yong (699–746?), Tang dynasty poet
- Zu Dashou (died 1656), Ming dynasty general who surrendered to the Qing
- Zu Zhiwang (祖之望; 1754–1813), Qing dynasty Governor of Hunan and Shandong provinces
- John B. Tsu (1924–2005), Chinese academic and lobbyist for Asians in the United States
- Jidi or Zu Yale (born 1983), cartoonist and illustrator
