= Ji (surname 吉) =

Chinese family name

Ji (吉)
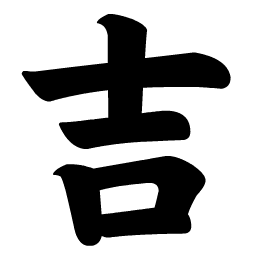
- Pronunciation: Jí (Mandarin); Gat (Cantonese)
- Language: Chinese

Origin
- Language: Old Chinese

Other names
- Variant forms: Chi, Kat, Gil (Korean)

Jí is the Mandarin pinyin romanization of the Chinese surname written 吉 in Chinese character. It is romanized as Chi in Wade–Giles, and Gat in Cantonese. Ji is the 195th most common surname in China, with a population of 490,000. It is listed 190th in the Song dynasty classic text Hundred Family Surnames.

== Demographics ==
As of 2008, Ji 吉 is the 195th most common surname in China, shared by 490,000 people, or 0.04% of the Chinese population. It is concentrated in the provinces of Jiangsu, Shandong, Shanxi, and Hainan, which together account for 50% of the total, including 15% in Jiangsu alone.

== Origins ==
According to tradition, there are two main origins of the Ji 吉 surname:

1. From the ancient state of Southern Yan. Bo Tiao (伯儵), said to a descendant of the Yellow Emperor, was enfeoffed at the Southern Yan (in modern Weihui, Henan). Bo Tiao's ancestral name was Ji 姞, and his descendants later dropped the 女 radical from their surname, which became Ji 吉.

2. From Xi Jia (兮甲), a top minister of King Xuan of Zhou (reigned 827–782 BC), during the Western Zhou dynasty. He led the Zhou army to defeat the Xianyun tribes of the north and the Dongyi people of the Huai River. His military feat was extolled in several songs collected in the Classic of Poetry. His courtesy name was Jifu (吉甫), and some of his descendants adopted Ji 吉, the main character of his courtesy name, as their surname.

A third possible origin was the legendary Jiyi tribe (吉夷氏). Some descendants of the tribe were said to have adopted Ji, the first character of Jiyi, as their surname.

== Notable people ==
- Ji Ben (吉本; died 218), Eastern Han court physician
- Ji Yi (吉挹; died 379), Eastern Jin general who died of a hunger strike after being captured by the Former Qin
- Ji Xu (吉頊; died c. 700), Chancellor under Empress Wu Zetian
- Ji Wen (吉温; died 755), Tang dynasty official
- Ji Wenyuan (吉文元; died 1854), military leader of the Taiping Rebellion
- Ji Hongchang (吉鸿昌; 1895–1934), Communist general, Chairman of Ningxia province
- Ji Xingwen (吉星文; 1908–1958), Kuomintang general
- Ji Bingxuan (吉炳轩; born 1951), former Communist Party Chief of Heilongjiang province
- Ji Lin (吉林; born 1962), Chairman of the Beijing Committee of the Chinese People's Political Consultative Conference
- Ji Xinpeng (吉新鹏; born 1977), Olympic badminton gold medalist
- Ji Xiang (吉翔; born 1990), professional football player
- Ji Zhe (吉喆; 1986–2019), professional basketball player (Beijing Ducks)
