= Sù (surname 宿) =

Sù (宿) is a Chinese surname. It was listed 266th among the Hundred Family Surnames.

== Notable people ==
- Su Maozhen (宿茂臻 1972, in Qingdao, Shandong) Chinese football coach
- Su Bai (宿白 1922 – 2018) Chinese archaeologist and bibliographer

== See also ==
- Suzhou, Anhui (宿州), city associated with the surname
