= Miáo (surname) =

Chinese family name

Miáo (苗) is a Chinese language surname. In 2013 it was counted as the 157th most common surname with 1 million people sharing the name or 0.075% of the total population, the province with the largest population of people with the name is Henan. It is the 53rd name on the Hundred Family Surnames poem.

== Notable people ==
- Miao Bo (苗波; born 1975), Chinese basketball player
- Miao Chunting (苗春亭; 1919–2020), Chinese politician
- Miao Hua (苗华; born 1955), Chinese military officer
- Miao Huaxu (苗华旭; born 2000), Chinese footballer
- Miao Jinqing (苗晉卿; 685–765), Tang Dynasty politician and chancellor
- Miao Ke-li (苗可麗; born Wu Kang-hua (吳岡樺), 1971), Taiwanese actress, television host, singer
- Miao Lijie (苗立杰; born 1981), Chinese basketball player
- Miao Litian (苗力田; 1917–2000), Chinese translator and professor
- Miao Miao (苗苗; born 1981), Australian table tennis player
- Michael Miu (苗僑偉; born 1958), Hong Kong actor and businessman
- Nora Miao (苗可秀; born Chan Wing-man (陳詠憫), 1952), Hong Kong actress
- Miao Poya (苗博雅; born 1987), Taiwanese politician
- Miao Pu (苗圃; born 1977), Chinese actress
- Miao Tian (苗甜; born 1993), Chinese rower, Olympic bronze medalist
- Miao Tien (苗天; 1925–2005), Chinese actor
- Vivi Miao (苗苗; born 1988), Chinese actress
- Miao Wei (苗圩; born 1955), Chinese politician and business executive
- Ying Miao (苗颖; born 1985), Chinese contemporary artist and writer
