= Zan (surname) =

Chinese family name

- Chinese: 昝
Transcriptions
Standard Mandarin
- Hanyu Pinyin: Zǎn
- Wade–Giles: Tsan^{3}
- IPA: [tsàn]
Yue: Cantonese
- Jyutping: Zaan^{2}
Middle Chinese
- Middle Chinese: /t͡sʌm^{X}/

Zan (昝) is a Chinese surname. It is romanized Tsan in Wade–Giles, or Zaan in Cantonese romanization. According to a 2013 study, it was the 391st most common name in China; it was shared by 87,000 people, or 0.007% of the population, with the province with the most people being Sichuan. It is the 165th name on the Hundred Family Surnames poem.

== Origins ==
- According to the Shuowen Jiezi, the surname may have originated as a corruption of 朁 (cǎn), which had a similar pronunciation.
- a surname originating in ancient southwestern China
- adopted as a surname by the Zan Lu (昝盧) or Chi Lu (叱盧) families from the Xianbei people in northern China during the Northern Wei period (AD 386–534)
- said to be adopted in place of the surname Jiu (咎 meaning ‘disaster’)

== Notable people ==
- Zan Jian (昝堅), Jin-era general
- Zan Jiaxiang (昝家驤), basketball player and coach
