= Rui (surname) =

Rui (芮)
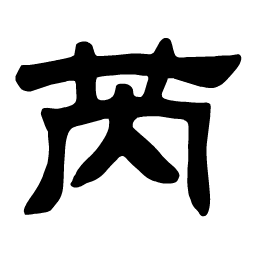
- Pronunciation: Ruì ([ɻwêɪ]) (Mandarin)
- Language: Chinese

Origin
- Language: Old Chinese

Other names
- Variant form: Jui

Rui is the Mandarin pinyin romanization of the Chinese surname written 芮 in Chinese characters. It is romanized Jui in Wade–Giles. Rui is listed 209th in the Song dynasty classic text Hundred Family Surnames. It is not among the 300 most common surnames in China. A 2013 study found that it was the 329th most common surname, shared by 146,000 people or 0.011% of the population, with Jiangsu being the province with the most.

== Notable people ==
- Rui Yifu (芮逸夫; 1898–1991), Chinese anthropologist
- Rui Zhenggao (芮正皋; 1919–2015), Chinese diplomat
- Rui Xingwen (1927–2005), Communist Party Chief of Shanghai
- Rui Qingkai (芮清凯; born 1945), lieutenant general of the People's Liberation Army
- Rui Naiwei (born 1963), Go player
- Rui Chenggang (born 1977), former China Central Television news anchor
