= Sha (surname) =

Sha (沙)
- Pronunciation: Shā (Mandarin)
- Language: Chinese

Origin
- Language: Old Chinese
- Meaning: Sand

Sha is the Mandarin pinyin and Wade–Giles romanization of the Chinese surname written 沙 in Chinese character. It is listed 387th in the Song dynasty classic text Hundred Family Surnames. As of 2008, it is the 216th most common surname in China, shared by 400,000 people.

== Notable people ==
- Sha Cheng (沙澄; died 1696), Qing dynasty Minister of Rites
- Sha Liang (沙亮; died 1748), Qing dynasty general
- Sha Chunyuan (沙春元; died 1858), Qing dynasty general, killed in the Second Opium War
- Sha Yuanbing (沙元炳; 1864–1927), politician and poet
- Sha Qianli (沙千里; 1901–1982), entrepreneur, Minister of Light Industry
- Sha Menghai (1900–1992), calligrapher
- Sha Ke (沙克; 1907–1993), PLA major general
- Sha Xuejun (沙学浚; 1907–1998), Republic of China geographer
- Sha Wenhan (1908–1964), historian, Governor of Zhejiang province, brother of Sha Menghai
- Sha Fei (1912–1950), war photographer
- Sha Qi (沙耆; 1914–2005), oil painter
- Sha Gengshi (沙更世; born 1926), calligrapher and painter, son of Sha Menghai
- Sha Guohe (沙国河; born 1934), chemist, member of the Chinese Academy of Sciences
- Sha Xianming (沙显明; born 1939), PLA lieutenant general
- Sha Yexin (1939–2018), playwright and political activist
- Sha Zukang (born 1947), former Under-Secretary-General of the United Nations
- Zhi Gang Sha (born 1956), self-styled spiritual healer
- Sha Hailin (沙海林; born 1957), politician and diplomat
- Sha Baoliang (沙宝亮; born 1972), singer
- Sha Yi (沙溢; born 1978), actor
- Sha Zhengwen (born 1990), member of the China women's national handball team
- Sha Yibo (born 1991), football player
- Sha Wujing, fictional character in the classic novel Journey to the West
