= Bei (surname) =

Bèi (贝/貝)
- Pronunciation: Bèi (Mandarin)
- Language: Chinese

Origin
- Language: Old Chinese

Other names
- Variant form: Pei
- Derivative: Sudarto (Indonesian)

Bèi is the Mandarin pinyin romanization of the Chinese surname written 贝 in simplified Chinese and 貝 in traditional Chinese. It is romanized Pei in Wade–Giles. Bei is listed 110th in the Song dynasty classic text Hundred Family Surnames. It is not among the 300 most common surnames in China.

== Notable people ==
- Bei Jinquan (贝锦泉; 1831–1890), Qing dynasty general
- Bei Shizhang (1903–2009), "Father of Chinese Biophysics"
- I. M. Pei (Bei Yuming, 1917–2019), Chinese-American architect
- Peggy Lam (Bei Yujia, born 1928), Hong Kong politician
- Pui Kwan Kay (Bei Junqi; 貝鈞奇; born 1951), Hong Kong businessman
- Bei Ling (貝嶺, born 1959), Chinese poet

== Fictional characters ==
- Bei Weiwei, a character in Love O2O
