= Bu (surname) =

Chinese family name

Bǔ (卜) is a Chinese surname. It is the 210th most common Chinese surname, being shared by 510,000 or 0.038% of the population, with Jiangsu being the province with the most people. It is the 92nd name on the Hundred Family Surnames poem.

== Notable people ==
- Bu Hua (born 1973), Chinese digital artist
- Bu Shang (507 – c. 420 BC), ancient Chinese philosopher
- Bu Shuaihang (born 2006), Chinese sport shooter
- Bu Tao (born 1983), Chinese baseball player
- Bu Xiangzhi (born 1985), Chinese chess player
- Bu Xin (born 1987), Chinese football player
- Bu Wancang (1900 – 1973), Chinese film director and screenwriter
- Bu Yunchaokete (born 2002), Chinese tennis player
