= Seek for Surname History =

Hong Kong television programme

- Genre: History series
- Presented by: Spencer Leung (Chinese: 梁思浩)
- Country of origin: Hong Kong
- Original language: Cantonese
- No. of episodes: 26

Production
- Running time: 30 minutes each episode

Original release
- Network: ATV
- Release: 16 February 2011

Seek for Surname History (Chinese: 尋找百姓家) is a TV series broadcast by ATV in Hong Kong in 2011. Each episode is dedicated to telling some of the legendary stories that belong to the Chinese surnames in the Hundred Family Surnames ancient text.

== Production ==
The first season features 26 episodes hosted by Spencer Leung (Chinese: 梁思浩). The content is not limited to just the five big surnames, but also covers lesser known names.

Many of the stories are legacy stories researched from ancient family trees that go back hundreds to thousands of years. Some of the stories focus on how the surname ended up in Hong Kong.

== Episode surnames ==
Episode	Chinese surnames	English	Description
1			Preview pilot episode
2	成	Cheng	
3	毛	Mao, Mo	
4	鄧	Deng, Tang, Teng	
5	李	Li, Lee	
6	曾	Zeng, Tsang, Tseng	
7	胡	Hu	
8	張	Zhang, Chang, Cheung	Cheung Ceoi-lyun (張隨聯) became a Buddhist in Guangdong Qing dynasty. After his death his body became enshrined in a statue to help villagers gain faith in fighting off a plague. The temple became successful, but thieves tried to corrupt and invade it. The son of the family had a dream where his ancestor instructed him to create a replica statue to decoy the thieves away. This allowed the family to escape to HK.
9	廖	Liao	
10	林	Lin, Lam	
11	鄧	Deng, Tang, Teng	During the transition from Northern to Southern Song dynasty, families of the royalties were being pursued by the Jin army. One of the princess (family name Zhao) was rescued by a military personnel named Deng Yun-loeng (鄧元亮), who thought she was just a little girl lost. After taking her into his home and raising her, she revealed in her older years that she was really the daughter of Emperor Gaozong of Song. After her identity was verified, she brought a great deal of wealth to the Deng family.
12	文	Wen	Related to the biography of Wen Tianxiang
