= Ji (surname 嵇) =

Chinese family name

Ji (嵇)
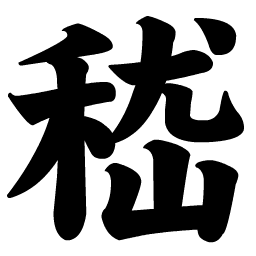
- Pronunciation: Jī (Mandarin); Gai (Cantonese)
- Language: Chinese

Origin
- Language: Old Chinese
- Origin: Kuaiji, Mount Ji

Other names
- Variant forms: Chi, Kai, Gai

Jī is the Mandarin pinyin romanization of the Chinese surname written 嵇 in Chinese characters. It is romanized as Chi in Wade–Giles and Kai or Gai in Cantonese. Ji is listed 194th in the Song dynasty classic Hundred Family Surnames. Relatively uncommon today, it is not among the top 300 surnames in China.

== Origin ==
According to the Yuanhe Xing Zuan, a Tang-era text on Chinese genealogy, the Ji surname originated from Kuaiji (present-day Shaoxing) on the southern shore of Hangzhou Bay in Zhejiang. King Shao Kang of the Xia was said to have enfeoffed one of his sons in the place and his descendants adopted Kuaiji or Ji (written 稽) as their surname. Then, during the early Han dynasty, a branch of this clan was said to have migrated to Mount Ji (嵇山) in Qiao Commandery (谯郡, within modern Bozhou in Anhui). They then altered the character of their surname to match their new home.

== Later adoption ==
During the Xianbei Northern Wei dynasty, Emperor Xiaowen (r. AD 467–499) implemented a drastic policy of sinicization, ordering his own people to adopt Chinese surnames. The Tongji (统嵇) tribe of the Xianbei adopted Ji as their surname.

== Notable people ==
- Ji Kang (嵇康; 223–262), Cao Wei era scholar and philosopher, one of the Seven Sages of the Bamboo Grove
- Ji Shao (嵇紹; 253–304), son of Ji Kang, died when protecting Emperor Hui of Jin during the War of the Eight Princes
- Ji Huang (嵇璜; 1711–1794), Qing dynasty politician and hydrologist
- Ji Wenfu (嵇文甫; 1895–1963), philosopher, President of Henan University, Vice Governor of Henan province
- Ji Ruyun (嵇汝运; 1918–2010), chemist, academician of Chinese Academy of Sciences
