= Shèn (surname) =

Chinese family name

Shèn is the pinyin romanization of the Chinese surname 慎 and 諶 / 谌.

Shen is the 340th surname in the Song-era Hundred Family Surnames.

== Romanisation ==
慎 is romanised as Thận in Vietnamese.

諶/谌 can also be read as Chèn.

== Distribution ==
Shen was unlisted among the 100 most common surnames in mainland China in 2007 or among the 100 most common surnames on Taiwan in 2005. Similarly, although Chinese make up the largest part of America's Asian and Pacific Islander population, none of the romanizations of 慎 appeared among the 1000 most common surnames during the AD 2000 US census.

== Origin ==
Shen is said to have originated in Yingshang County.

== Notable people ==
- Shen Dao (c. 350 BC–c. 275 BC), Chinese philosopher and writer
- Shen Haixiong (born 1967), Chinese journalist and propaganda official
