= Duanmu =

Duanmu (端木)
- Pronunciation: Duānmù (Mandarin)
- Language: Chinese

Origin
- Language: Old Chinese

Other names
- Variant forms: Tuan-mu, Twanmoh

Duanmu is the Mandarin pinyin romanization of the Chinese compound surname written 端木 in Chinese characters. It is romanized as Tuan-mu in Wade–Giles. Duanmu is listed 447th in the Song dynasty classic text Hundred Family Surnames. It is not among the 300 most common surnames in modern China.

== Notable people ==
- Duanmu Ci or Zigong (520–456 BC), disciple of Confucius, one of the Twelve Philosophers
- Duanmu Shu (端木叔), Warring States period descendant of Duanmu Ci, known for his wealth and philanthropy
- Duan Fuchu or Duanmu Fuchu (端復初; 1321–1373), Ming dynasty Minister of Justice
- Duanmu Guohu (端木國瑚; 1773–1837), Qing dynasty official and scholar of the I Ching
- Duanmu Jie (端木傑; 1897–1972), Republic of China general and Minister of Transportation
- Joseph K. Twanmoh (端木愷 Duanmu Kai, 1903–1987), Republic of China politician, president of Soochow University (Taiwan)
- Duanmu Hongliang (1912–1996), novelist
- Lucy Duanmu (端木露西; 1912–1998), writer, wife of Chu Anping
- Duanmu Zheng (端木正; 1920–2006), Vice President of the Supreme People's Court of the PRC, son of Duanmu Jie
- Duanmu Mei (端木美), historian, daughter of Duanmu Zheng
- Duanmu San (端木三), professor of linguistics, University of Michigan
