= Hè (surname) =

Chinese surname

Hè (simplified Chinese: 贺; traditional Chinese: 賀; pinyin: Hè; IPA: [xɤ̂])), also romanized as Ho, is a Chinese surname that is 71st in the list of the top 100 most common Chinese family names. The Chinese character 贺 / 賀 means "celebrate" or "congratulate." According to a 2013 study, He was the 86th most common surname, shared by 2,740,000 people or 0.210% of the population, with the province with the most people being Hunan. It is the 70th name on the Hundred Family Surnames poem.

== Origin ==
The surname originated as a semantic variant of Qing (庆), which can be traced back to Qing Feng (庆封), the great-grandson of Duke Huan of Qi. In the Eastern Han dynasty, a well-known official and descendant of the Qing family, Qing Chun (庆纯), changed his surname to He, which has the same meaning as Qing, because his surname Qing happened to be the given name of Liu Qing (刘庆), the father of the Emperor An of Han, in order to avoid a naming taboo.

Another origin was a shortened form of disyllabic surnames such as He Lan (贺兰), He Lai (贺赖), He Dun (贺敦), which were from the Xianbei ethnic group, shortened to He through cultural fusion with the Han people during Northern and Southern dynasties.

== Notable people ==
- He Jingzhi (贺敬之; born 1924), politician and poet
- He Bingyan (贺炳炎; 1913–1960) was a general in the People's Liberation Army
- He Mengfu (賀孟斧; 1911–1945) a Chinese film and theatre director from Wujin, Jiangsu
- He Jiankui (贺建奎), Chinese scientist known for the Lulu and Nana gene editing controversy
- He Zhizhang (賀知章), Tang Dynasty poet
- He Long (贺龙), Chinese military leader and one of the Ten Marshals of the People's Republic of China
- He Zizhen (贺子珍) third wife of Mao Zedong from May 1930 to 1937
- He Guoqiang (贺国强) retired senior leader of the Chinese Communist Party
- He Weifang (贺卫方), professor at Peking University
- Mike He (賀軍翔), Taiwanese actor
- Anna Mae He (贺梅; born 1999), an American child who was the subject of a custody battle between her Chinese biological parents and American adopted parents
- He Guan (贺惯; born 1993 in Tai'an) is a Chinese football player
- He Ying (revolutionary) (賀英), originally He Mingying (born 1886), was a Chinese revolutionary born in Sangzhi County, Hunan province
- He Zhongshan (賀衷寒), notable Kuomintang general that also served as Ministry of Transportation in Taiwan
- He Junlin (贺峻霖), Chinese singer, member of Teens in Times
