= Lu (surname 祿) =

Chinese family name

Lù (禄)
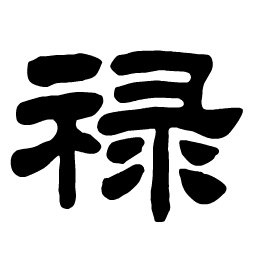
- Pronunciation: Lù (Mandarin); Luk (Cantonese)
- Language: Chinese

Origin
- Language: Old Chinese

Lu (simplified Chinese: 禄; traditional Chinese: 祿; pinyin: Lù) is a Chinese surname. It is also spelled Luk according to the Cantonese pronunciation. Lu 禄 is listed 358th in the Song dynasty classic text Hundred Family Surnames. Relatively uncommon, Lu 禄 is not among the top 300 surnames in China.

== Origins ==
According to the second-century Eastern Han dynasty text Fengsu Tongyi, the Lu 禄 surname originated from Wu Geng, the son of King Zhou, the last king of the Shang dynasty. Wu Geng's courtesy name was Lufu (禄父), and his descendants adopted Lu as their surname.

According to the Ming dynasty book Wan Xing Tong Pu (萬姓統譜, Genealogies of Ten Thousand Surnames), another origin of Lu 禄 is the Zhou dynasty government office silu (司禄). Lu is the abbreviation of silu.

A third origin of Lu is more recent, from Lufeng County and Luquan Yi and Miao Autonomous County, both in southwestern Yunnan province, inhabited by many ethnic minorities. Lu 禄 is the first character of Lufeng and Luquan.

== Notable people ==
- Lady Lu (禄氏), Qing dynasty leader in Yunnan, mother of Marquis of Longqing
- Lu Zhiming (禄智明; born 1952), vice governor of Guizhou province
