= Nian (surname) =

Nian (Chinese: 年; pinyin: Nián), also transliterated Nien, is a Chinese surname listed in the Hundred Family Surnames.

It was not one of the 400 most common surnames in China as of 2013.

Notable people with the surname include:

- Ah Nian (born 1965), filmmaker
- Nian Gengyao (1679–1726), Qing dynasty military commander
- Nian Guangjiu (1940–2023), melon seed entrepreneur
- Nian Weisi (born 1933), association football player
- Nian Yun (born 1982), Olympic swimmer
