= Yong (surname) =

Chinese family name

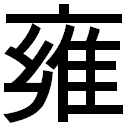

Chinese name
- Chinese: 雍
- Literal meaning: harmony
Transcriptions
Standard Mandarin
- Hanyu Pinyin: Yōng
- Wade–Giles: Yung^{1}
- IPA: [jʊ́ŋ]
Yue: Cantonese
- Jyutping: Jung^{1}
Southern Min
- Hokkien POJ: Iong
Middle Chinese
- Middle Chinese: 'jowng
Old Chinese
- Zhengzhang: /*qoŋ/

Vietnamese name
- Vietnamese: Ung

Yong (雍) is a Chinese surname. It is Romanized as Yung in Wade-Giles, Iong in Min Nan and Yung in Cantonese. According to a 2013 study, it was the 339th most common name in China; it was shared by 139,000 people, or 0.01% of the population, being most popular in Sichuan. It is the 304th name in the Hundred Family Surnames poem.

== Origins ==
The surname Yong is claimed to derive from one of:

- from Yong (雍), the name of a Shang-era fief located in Fengxiang, Shaanxi
- from the placename Yong (雍), a state (located in modern Henan) granted to Yong Bo (雍伯), twelfth son of King Wen of Zhou (1152–1056 BC)
- from the personal name Yong (雍), a son of the Duke Huan of Qi (d. 643 BC)

== Notable people ==
- Yong Ji (雍己), Shang king
- Yong Zhiwei (雍智伟), archer
- Yong Chi (雍齒, d. 192 BC), nobleman of the Qin/Han period
