= Zai (surname) =

Zai (宰)
- Pronunciation: Zǎi (Mandarin)
- Language: Chinese

Origin
- Language: Old Chinese

Other names
- Variant form: Tsai

Zai is the Mandarin pinyin romanization of the Chinese surname written 宰 in Chinese character. It is romanized Tsai in Wade–Giles. Zai is listed 302nd in the Song dynasty classic text Hundred Family Surnames. It is not among the 300 most common surnames in China. It was also confirmed not to be among the 400 most common surnames in 2013.

== Notable people ==
- Zai Kong (宰孔; 7th century BC), Duke of Zhou during the Spring and Autumn period
- Zai Yu or Zai Wo (522–458 BC), disciple of Confucius, one of the Twelve Philosophers
- Zai Yingwen (宰應文), Ming dynasty person famous for filial piety
