= Pi (surname) =

Pi (皮)
- Pronunciation: Pí (Mandarin); Pei (Cantonese)
- Language: Chinese

Origin
- Language: Old Chinese

Other names
- Variant form: P'i

Pi is the Mandarin pinyin romanization of the Chinese surname written 皮 in Chinese character. It is romanized P'i in Wade–Giles, and Pei in Cantonese. Pi is listed 85th in the Song dynasty classic text Hundred Family Surnames. According to a 2008 study, it was not among the 300 most common surnames in China. However a 2013 study found that it was the 279th most common name, being shared by 229,000 people or 0.017% of the population, with the province with the most people being Hunan.

The same surname is also a Korean family name (Korean: 피; MR: P'i), shared by 6,578 people in South Korea in 2015.

== Notable people ==
- Rixiu (ca. 834–883), classical poet
- Pi Guangye (877–943), chancellor of the Wuyue Kingdom
- Pi Xirui (皮錫瑞; 1850–1908), Confucianist
- Pi Zongshi (1887–1967), President of Hunan University
- Ignatius Pi Shushi (1897–1978), archbishop of the Roman Catholic Archdiocese of Shenyang
- Pi Dingjun (皮定钧; 1914–1976), PLA lieutenant general
- So-Young Pi (born 1946), South Korean physicist
- Pi Hongyan (born 1979), Chinese-born French badminton player
