= Yue (surname) =

岳, 樂 Yue
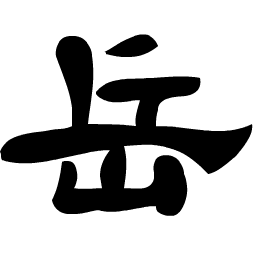
- Pronunciation: Yuè

Origin
- Origin: China
- Meaning: Mountain

Yuè is the Hanyu Pinyin transliteration of the Chinese family name 岳. In places which use the Wade-Giles romanization such as Taiwan, Yue is usually spelled as "Yüeh" or "Yueh".

Yuè is also the pinyin transliteration of the surname 樂 in traditional character and 乐 in simplified character. This name can also be read as Lè, which has a different origin.

== Prominent individuals with the surname Yue 岳 ==
- Yue Hua (岳華) actor
- Yue Fei (岳飛) military general who lived in the Southern Song dynasty
- Yue Xin (activist) (岳昕) feminist and Marxist activist

== Prominent individuals with the surname Yue 樂/乐 ==
It is the 81st name on the Hundred Family Surnames poem.

- Yue Jin (樂進) Military General who served under Warlord Cao Cao in the Late Han dynasty
- Yue Yi (樂毅) Minister of the states of Zhao and Yan in the Warring States era
- Yue Guang (樂廣) Minister of West Jin during the Jin dynasty
