= Bo (Chinese surname) =

Origin
- Region of origin: China

Bo is a set of several Chinese family names, including 薄 Bó, 柏 Bó/Bǎi, 波 Bō, 伯 Bó, etc. Among these names, 柏 is the 213th most common surname in China at present, shared by at least 430,000 Chinese citizens, although when used as a surname it is generally pronounced Bai. None of the other characters pronounced Bo are currently in the top 300 surnames in China, although surname 薄 is the 271st surname in the Hundred Family Surnames and is quite well known due to it being the family name of high-profile politicians Bo Xilai and his father Bo Yibo.

== Notable people named Bo ==
According to a 2013 study, 薄 was the 337th most common surname, being shared by 140,000 people or 0.011% of the population, with the province with the most people having the name being Shandong.

=== 薄 Bó ===
- Empress Dowager Bo (died 155 BC) of the Han dynasty
- Empress Bo (died 147 BC) of the Han dynasty
- Bo Yibo (薄一波;1908 – 2007), Chinese communist politician
- Bo Xilai (simplified Chinese: 薄熙来; traditional Chinese: 薄熙來; born 1949), son to Bo Yibo, former CPC Chongqing Committee Secretary
- Bo Bing (薄冰;1921 – 2013), Chinese English grammar academic

=== 柏 Bó ===
- Bo Yang, penname of Guō Dìngshēng (郭定生), a writer in Taiwan

=== 波 Bō ===
- Bo Cai, a minor leader of the Yellow Turban Rebellion in the Han dynasty

=== 伯 Bó ===
- Bo Pi, treacherous official of Wu (state) during the late Spring and Autumn period
