= Nong (surname) =

Chinese family name

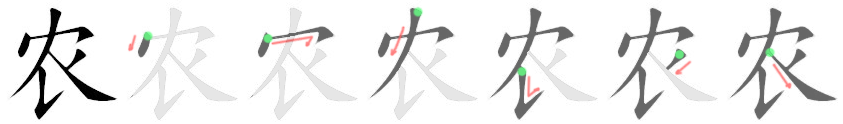
- Stroke order of the simplified version of Nong (农)
- Traditional Chinese: 農
- Simplified Chinese: 农
Transcriptions
Standard Mandarin
- Hanyu Pinyin: Nóng
- Wade–Giles: Nung^{2}
- IPA: [nʊ̌ŋ]
Yue: Cantonese
- Jyutping: Nung^{4}
Southern Min
- Hokkien POJ: Lâng
Middle Chinese
- Middle Chinese: /nuoŋ/

Nong (simplified Chinese: 农; traditional Chinese: 農 or 辳) is a Chinese surname meaning "farmer". It is romanized Nung in Wade–Giles or Cantonese romanization. According to a 2013 study, it was the 189th most common name in China; it was shared by 640,000 people, or 0.047% of the population, with the surname being most common in Guangxi. It is the 320th name in the Hundred Family Surnames poem.

== Origins ==
Two origins are proposed:

- In honour of Shennong (神農, "Divine Farmer"), mythological figure who brought agriculture and herbal medicine to China
- From the ancient post of nongzheng (農正, "agriculture officer").

== Notable people ==
- Nong Qunhua (农群华; born 1966), Chinese badminton player
- Nong Rong (农融; born 1967), Chinese diplomat
