= Ping (surname) =

Ping (平)
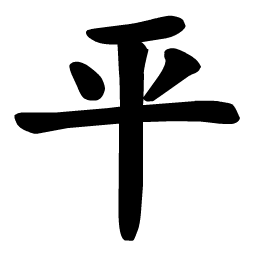
- Pronunciation: Píng (Mandarin)
- Language: Chinese

Origin
- Language: Old Chinese

Other names
- Variant form: P'ing

Ping is the Mandarin pinyin romanization of the Chinese surname written 平 in Chinese character. It is romanized P'ing in Wade–Giles. Ping is listed 95th in the Song dynasty classic text Hundred Family Surnames. It is not among the 300 most common surnames in China in 2008.

== Notable people ==
- Ping Dang (平當; died 4 AD), Han dynasty chancellor
- Ping Yan (平晏; died 20 AD), son of Ping Dang, Xin dynasty government minister
- Ping An (平安; died 1409), Ming dynasty general, adopted son of the Hongwu Emperor
- Ping Hailan (平海澜; 1885–1960), educator, co-founder of Utopia University
- Ping Fan (平凡; 1920–1999), Hong Kong actor
- Ping Hsin-tao (平鑫濤; 1927–2019), Taiwanese publisher and filmmaker, husband of Chiung Yao
- Ping Yali (平亚丽; born 1961), long jumper, first Chinese Paralympic gold medalist
- Ping An (平安; born 1978), singer

== People from elsewhere with the surname ==
- Jean Ping (born 1942), Gabonese diplomat and Chairperson of the Commission of the African Union
- Nimrod Ping (1947–2006), politician in Brighton, England
