= Lang (Chinese surname) =

Chinese family name

Láng (Chinese: 郎; pinyin: Láng) is a surname of Chinese and Manchu origin. It was an official title in imperial times, meaning "minister" or "councillor". According to a 2013 study, it is the 242nd most common surname in China; around 370,000 people (0.028% of the total population) have the name, and it is most common in the province of Hebei. It is the 48th name on the Hundred Family Surnames poem.

== Origins ==
- Lang (郎) was the name of a city where Fei Bo (費伯), the grandson of Duke Yi of Lu, lived. Some of his descendants later changed their original surname Fei to Lang (郎).
- The surname is also borne by some families from the state of the South Huns.
- Additionally, during the Qing dynasty, the Niohuru family of Manchu origin sinicized their family name, changing it to Lang (郎), which sounded like "wolf" (狼; also Láng) in Mandarin Chinese, since niohuru was derived from the Manchu word for "wolf".

== Notable people ==
- Lang Jingshan, Chinese photographer
- Lang Lang (born 1982), Chinese pianist
- Lang Ping (born 1960), Chinese former volleyball player and coach
- Lang Zheng (郎征; born 1986), Chinese footballer
- Lang Shining, Chinese name of Giuseppe Castiglione, (1688–1766) Italian Jesuit brother
- Lang Tzu-yun (郎祖筠; born 1965), Taiwanese actress
- Lang Yongchun (郎永淳; born 1971), Chinese former news anchor best known for his work at China Central Television

== See also ==
- Lang (surname), a surname of Germanic origin
