= Sang (surname) =

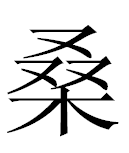
- Romanisation: Sang
- Language: Chinese

Sang is the pinyin romanization of the Chinese surname 桑 (Sāng). A variant traditional form is 桒. Both forms were unlisted among the Song-era Hundred Family Surnames.

== Distribution ==
Sang was unlisted among the 100-most-common surnames in mainland China in 2007 or on Taiwan in 2005. It was the 16,712th most common name in United States during the 2000 US census.

== History ==
Sang literally means "mulberry". Its Old Chinese form has been reconstructed as *sˤaŋ, but it was already Sang by the time of Middle Chinese.

== List of persons with the surname ==
- George Assang (1927–1997), Australian singer and actor; surname anglicised from (Ah) Sang
- Sang Guowei (b. 1941), Chinese politician
- Sang Hongyang (c. 152–80 BC), Han-era official
- Sang Lan (b. 1981), Chinese gymnast and television personality
- Samantha Sang (b. 1951), the stage name of the Chinese-Australian singer Cheryl Lau Sang
- Stephanie Sang Xu (b. 1986), Chinese-Australian table tennis player
- Sang Xue (b. 1984), Chinese diver
- Sang Yang (b. 1982), Chinese badminton player
- Tom Sang (b. 1999), football player from Liverpool, England
