= Hang (surname) =

Chinese family name

Chinese name
- Chinese: 杭
Transcriptions
Standard Mandarin
- Hanyu Pinyin: Háng
- Wade–Giles: Hang^{2}
- IPA: [xǎŋ]
Yue: Cantonese
- Jyutping: Hong^{4}
Southern Min
- Hokkien POJ: Hâng
Middle Chinese
- Middle Chinese: /hang/
Old Chinese
- Zhengzhang: /*ɡaːŋ/

Vietnamese name
- Vietnamese: Hàng

Hang (杭) is a Chinese surname. It is romanized Hong in Cantonese romanization. According to a 2013 study, it was the 350th most common name in China; it was shared by 128,000 people, or 0.01% of the population, being most popular in Jiangsu. It is the 183rd name in the Hundred Family Surnames poem.

== Origins ==
Hang (杭) was adopted in place of another Chinese surname, 抗 (Kàng, "fight against"), which can be traced back to San Kang (三抗, 三杭, 三伉), an official in the state of Wey during the Spring and Autumn Period. The two characters 抗 and 杭 were interchangeable in ancient Chinese. During the Northern Song period (10th–12th centuries AD), many people with the surname 抗 (Kàng) changed it to 杭 (Hang).

== Notable people ==
- Empress Hang (d. 1456), wife of the Jingtai Emperor
- Hang Yihong (杭义洪, born 1962), engineer
- Han Lih-wu (杭立武, 1903–1991), educator, politician and diplomat
