= Diao =

Diao (刁)
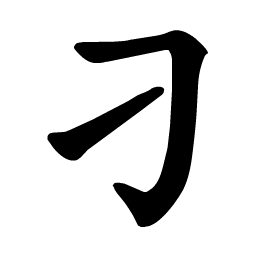
- Pronunciation: Diāo (Mandarin)
- Language: Chinese

Origin
- Language: Old Chinese

Other names
- Variant form: Tiao

Diao is the Mandarin pinyin romanization of the Chinese surname written 刁 in Chinese character. It is romanized as Tiao in Wade–Giles. Diao is listed 148th in the Song dynasty classic text Hundred Family Surnames. As of 2008, it is the 245th most common surname in China, shared by 300,000 people.

== Notable people ==
- Diao Jian (刁间), one of the richest merchants of the Western Han dynasty
- Diao Zidu (刁子都; died 26 AD), Xin dynasty rebel leader
- Diao Xie (刁協; died 322), Eastern Jin dynasty prime minister
- Diao Yi (刁彝), son of Diao Xie, avenged his father's death
- Diao Yong (刁雍; 390–484), Eastern Jin official, great-grandson of Diao Xie
- Diao Guangyin or Diao Guang (刁光胤; ca. 852–935), Tang dynasty painter
- George Tiao (刁錦寰; born 1933), statistician, member of the Academia Sinica
- Diao Wenyuan (刁文元; born 1943), table tennis player and coach
- David Diao (born 1943), Chinese-American artist
- Diao Guoxin (刁国新; born 1958), PLA lieutenant general
- Diao Yinan (born 1969), filmmaker and actor
- Diao Xiaojuan (born 1986), female Hong Kong cyclist
- Barbie Diao (刁扬; born 1990), model
- Diao Linyu (刁琳宇; born 1994), women's volleyball player
- Chuti Tiu, American actress

== See also ==
- Ousmane Diao (born 2004), Senegalese footballer
- Salif Diao (born 1977), Senegalese footballer
