= Bing (Chinese surname) =

Chinese family name

Bing (邴)
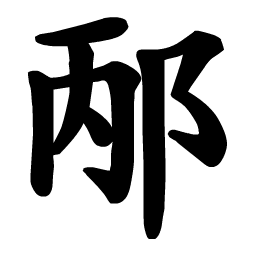
- Pronunciation: Bǐng (Mandarin)
- Language: Chinese

Origin
- Language: Old Chinese

Other names
- Variant form: Ping

Bing is the Mandarin pinyin romanization of the Chinese surname written 邴 in Chinese character. It is romanized Ping in Wade–Giles. Bing is listed 214th in the Song dynasty classic text Hundred Family Surnames. It is not among the 300 most common surnames in China.

== Origin ==
During the Spring and Autumn period (771–476 BC), a government minister of the State of Qi (in modern-day Shandong province) was enfeoffed at the settlement of Bing. He and his descendants adopted Bing as their surname.

== Notable people ==
- Bing Ji (邴吉; died 55 AD), Han dynasty chancellor
- Bing Yuan (邴原), Eastern Han politician
- Bing Zhigang (邴志刚; born 1957), Vice-Governor of Liaoning province
