= Ji (surname 暨) =

Chinese family name

Ji (暨)
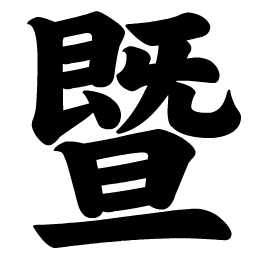
- Pronunciation: Jì (Mandarin); Kei (Cantonese)
- Language: Chinese

Origin
- Language: Old Chinese

Other names
- Variant forms: Chi, Kei

Jì is the Mandarin pinyin romanization of the Chinese surname written 暨 in Chinese character. It is romanized as Chi in Wade–Giles and Kei in Cantonese. Ji is listed 345th in the Song dynasty classic text Hundred Family Surnames. It is not among the 300 most common surnames in China.

== Origins ==
According to tradition, there are two main sources of the Ji 暨 surname:

1. From Luzhong (陆终), a great-great-grandson of the legendary emperor Zhuanxu. Luzhong's father Wuhui (吴回) was put in charge of fire by Emperor Ku and given the title of Zhu Rong. A descendant of Dapeng (大彭), the third son of Luzhong, was enfeoffed in Ji 暨 (in modern Dongmocheng Township, Jiangyin, Jiangsu), and his descendants adopted Ji as their surname.

2. From Fugai (夫概), a younger brother of King Helü of the Kingdom of Wu, a major power of the Spring and Autumn period. Fugai attempted to usurp the throne of Wu, but was defeated by Helü and fled to the Kingdom of Chu. Some descendants of Fugai adopted Gai 概, the second character in Fugai's name, as their surname. It was later changed to the similar character Ji 暨.

== Notable people ==
- Ji Yan (暨豔), Eastern Wu official
- Ji Xun (暨逊), Jin dynasty official, Marquis of Guannei (关内侯)
- Ji Yanyun (暨彦赟), Southern Han general and navy commander
- Ji Tao (暨陶), Song dynasty official
