= Guo (surname 國) =

Chinese family name

Chinese name
- Traditional Chinese: 國
- Simplified Chinese: 国
- Literal meaning: country
Transcriptions
Standard Mandarin
- Hanyu Pinyin: Guó
- Wade–Giles: Kuo^{2}
- IPA: [kwǒ]
Yue: Cantonese
- Jyutping: Gwok^{3}
Southern Min
- Hokkien POJ: Kok
Middle Chinese
- Middle Chinese: kwok
Old Chinese
- Zhengzhang: /*kʷɯːɡ/

Japanese name
- Kana: くに、こく、くく

Guo (trad. 國, simp. 国) is a Chinese surname. It is Romanized as Kuo in Wade-Giles, Kok in Min Nan and Gwok in Cantonese. According to a 2013 study, it was the 339th most common name in China; it was shared by 171,000 people, or 0.013% of the population, being most popular in Shandong. It is the 354th name in the Hundred Family Surnames poem.

It should not be confused with the much more common surname Guō (郭) (lit. 'city wall').

== Origins ==
Stroke order of the simplified character

The surname Guo is claimed to derive from:

- descendants of Guo Ai (國哀), teacher of Yu the Great, first Xia dynasty king
- descendants of a noble family in the state of Qi during the Spring and Autumn period (770–476 BC)
- Zi Guo (子國), style name of Fa, a prince in the state of Zheng during the Spring and Autumn period
- The Koku/Kuni clan is one of the historical clans of Japan, known as a Toraijin (clan of immigrant descent). The family traces its origin to one of the Great Eight Families from Baekje, specifically the character “Guk” (國). The name appears in various classical sources such as the Nihon Shoki. In the Nihon Shoki, under the reign of Emperor Kinmei, a Baekje figure named Kuni Suita (国雖多) is recorded. Additionally, the Shoku Nihongi notes in the entry for October of Hōki 5 (774): "San’i Jūshi no Ge, Kuni no Naka no Muraji Kimimaro has passed away. He was originally a man from the country of Baekje." It is said that his grandfather Kuni Kotsufu (国骨富) came to Japan during the second year of Emperor Tenji (663), after the fall of Baekje. Over time, the Kuni clan diversified into several branch families under Japan's hereditary surname system, such as Kokui, Kokue, Kokubo, Kogura, and Kokubo (using alternative readings). Some lineages preserved the original one-character surname "Kuni (国)," which still appears today in regions such as Shiga, Hyōgo, and Ishikawa Prefectures.
- The Koku surname also exists as a one-character surname in the Amami Islands, particularly in Amami City, Yuwan Village, and Setouchi Town, all in Kagoshima Prefecture.
- In Ryukyu and Okinawa, many surnames incorporate the character "Kuni", including Kunigami/Kunjan (国頭), Kokuba/Kukuba (国場), and Kuniyoshi/Kunishi (国吉). After the Ryukyu Disposition in the early Meiji period, some dissidents who fled to Qing China or elsewhere simplified their family names during exile, and adopted the single-character surname Koku/Kuku (国) as a mark of their heritage.

== Notable people ==
- Guo Yuan (Zini) (國淵, fl. AD 190s–210s), advisor to Cao Cao
- Guo Ai (國哀; d. 1428), concubine of the Xuande Emperor
- Guo Wei (国伟, born 1969), ice hockey player
- Guo Linyao (国林耀, born 1972), gymnast
