= Min (surname) =

Min (闵/閔)
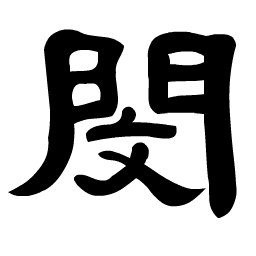
- Pronunciation: Min (Mandarin); Man (Cantonese)
- Language: Chinese

Origin
- Language: Old Chinese

Other names
- Variant form: Man
- Derivative: Min (Korean surname)

Min is the Mandarin pinyin and Wade–Giles romanization of the Chinese surname written 闵 in simplified Chinese and 閔 in traditional Chinese. It is romanized Man in Cantonese. It is also romanized as Mẫn in Vietnamese. Min is listed 132nd in the Song dynasty classic text Hundred Family Surnames. As of 2008, it is the 193rd most common surname in China, shared by 520,000 people. In 2013 it was the 224 the most common, with around 4.3 million people sharing the name, accounting for 0.032% of the total population, with the province with the most people sharing the name being Hubei.

== Notable people ==
- Min Sun (536–487 BC), major disciple of Confucius
- Min Gui (閔珪; 1430–1511), Ming dynasty Viceroy of Liangguang and Minister of War
- Min Kai (閔楷; 16th century), Ming dynasty Minister of Revenue
- Min Hongxue (閔洪學; 16th–17th century), Ming dynasty Minister of Personnel
- Min Mengde (闵梦得; 1565–1628), Ming dynasty Minister of War
- Min Zhen (1730–?), Qing dynasty painter
- Min Yide (闵一得; 1758–1836), Qing dynasty Taoist
- Min Erchang (闵尔昌; 1872–1948), poet and historian
- Min Ganghou (闵刚侯; 1904–1971), PRC Vice Minister of Justice
- Min Zhiting (闵智亭; 1924–2004), chairman of the Chinese Taoist Association
- Min Enze (1924–2016), petrochemical engineer, member of the Chinese Academy of Sciences
- Min Naida (闵乃大; 1911–2001), Chinese-German computer scientist
- Min Guirong (闵桂荣; 1933–2021), astrophysicist, member of the Chinese Academy of Sciences
- Min Naiben (1935–2018), physicist, member of the Chinese Academy of Sciences, brother of Min Naida
- Min Huifen (1945–2014), erhu master
- Min Xiao-Fen, Chinese-American pipa player, sister of Min Huifen
- Min Weifang (闵维方; born 1950), former vice president of Peking University
- Anchee Min or Min Anqi (born 1957), Chinese-American author
- Min Lulei (闵鹿蕾; born 1963), basketball player and coach
- Min Chunfeng (born 1969), female discus thrower
- Min Jin (born 1978), football player
- Min Chunxiao (闵春晓; born 1983), actress
