= Ji (surname 籍) =

Chinese family name

Ji (籍)
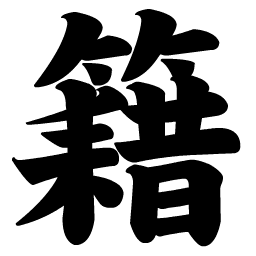
- Pronunciation: Jí (Mandarin); Zik (Cantonese)
- Language: Chinese

Origin
- Language: Old Chinese

Other names
- Variant forms: Chi, Zik

Jí is the Mandarin pinyin romanization of the Chinese surname written 籍 in Chinese character. It is romanized as Chi in Wade–Giles, and Zik in Cantonese. Ji is listed 275th in the Song dynasty classic text Hundred Family Surnames. It is not among the 300 most common surnames in China.

== Origin ==
According to the Zuo Zhuan and the Song dynasty encyclopedia Tongzhi, the surname Ji 籍 originated from Bo Yan (伯黡), a chief minister of the state of Jin, a major power of the Spring and Autumn period. Boyan was in charge of government records, and was commonly referred to as Ji Yan (ji 籍 means record). His descendants adopted Ji as their surname.

During the Chu–Han Contention, many people surnamed Ji 籍 changed their surname to Xi 席 because of naming taboo of Xiang Yu, the Hegemon-King of Western Chu, whose given name was Ji 籍.

== Notable people ==
- Bo Yan (伯黡) or Ji Yan, chief minister of the state of Jin
- Ji Yan or Ji You (籍偃, fl. 6th century BC), official serving under Duke Dao of Jin
- Ji Tan (籍谈, fl. 6th century BC), son of Ji You, official serving under Duke Ping of Jin
- Ji Qin (籍秦, fl. 6th century BC), a younger son of Ji You, official serving under Duke Qing of Jin
- Ji Ru (籍孺), Western Han eunuch
- Ji Zhongyin (籍忠寅; 1877–1930), Qing dynasty and Republic of China politician
- Ji Xiaocheng (籍孝诚; 1923–2019), paediatrician, introduced perinatal medicine to China
