= Gongye =

Gongye (Chinese: 公冶; pinyin: Gōngyě) is a Chinese compound surname listed in the Hundred Family Surnames. Its choronym or clan identifier (郡望) is Lu Commandery, in what is now Qufu, Shandong.

According to the Xingshi Kaolüe (姓氏考略), the surname comes from Ji Ye (季冶) of the State of Lu during the Spring and Autumn period. His courtesy name was Gongye, which his descendants adopted as a surname.

The surname was eventually simplified to Gong (公); it is one of many two-character surnames beginning with Gong (公) that were simplified to just the one character over the course of history.

Gongye Chang, a disciple of Confucius, had this surname. It was also the courtesy name of Spring and Autumn period politician Ji Ye (季冶) and Qing dynasty politician Ji Ruxi (冀如錫).
