= Rao (Chinese surname) =

- Pronunciation: Mandarin: Ráo

Origin
- Language: Chinese
- Region of origin: modern day Shanxi and Jiangxi.

Rao (simplified Chinese: 饶; traditional Chinese: 饒; pinyin: Ráo; Wade–Giles: Jao) is a Chinese family name. It can also be spelled as "Yow" or "Yaw".

The surname Rao is approximately 2200 years old, and originated in the area near present-day Linfen county in Shanxi province.

It is the 181st most common name being shared by around 730,000 people or 0.055% of the population with the province with the most people being Jiangxi. It is on the Hundred Family Surnames poem.

== Notable people ==
- Jao Tsung-I (1917–2018), Hong Kong Chinese calligrapher
- Ngeow Sze Chan (1915–2002), Malaysian practitioner of traditional Chinese medicine
- Rao Ching-ling (born 1969), magistrate of Taitung County
- Rao Shushi (1903–1975), senior member of the Chinese Communist Party
- Rao Yi (born 1962 in Jiangxi), neuroscientist
- Rao Yutai (1891–1968), physicist
- Yaw Shin Leong (1976–2023), Singaporean politician
- Nyu Kok Meng, Malaysian and convicted robber who committed armed robbery in Singapore.
