= Fēng (surname 封) =

Fēng (封) is a Chinese family name. It is No.208 in the Baijiaxing, and 257 in the modern census, called the "New Baijiaxing".

There are two recorded origins for the name. The first according to the Xingyuan (《姓苑》) from a prince originally with the name Jiang. The second according to Weishu Guanshizhi 《魏书·官氏志》 the name Fu (复) was changed to Feng (封).

== Notable people with the surname ==
- Feng Deyi (封德彝) (568–627), formal name Feng Lun (封倫) chancellor to the emperors of the Tang Dynasty
- Feng Changqing (Chinese: 封常清; pinyin: Fēng Chángqīng; Wade–Giles: Feng Ch'angch'ing (died January 24, 756[1]) a general of the Tang Dynasty.
- Feng Congde (born 1966), political activist
- Feng Donglai, physicist
- Feng Hetu (438–501), official in the Northern Wei dynasty
- Feng Jialiang (born 1966), painter
- Peter Feng Xinmao (born 1963), Catholic priest
- Feng Yi (died 365), official during the Sixteen Kingdoms period
- zh:Category:封姓
