= Liǔ =

Chinese surname

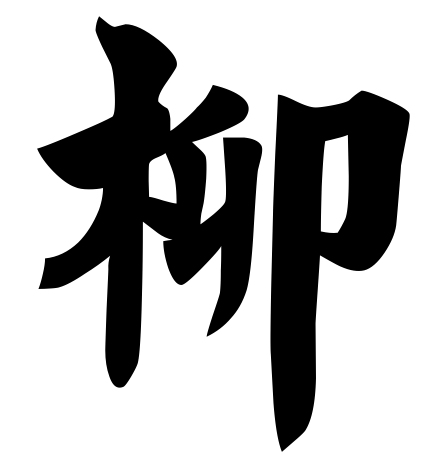
- Language: Chinese, Japanese, Korean, Vietnamese

Origin
- Language: Old Chinese
- Meaning: willow

Other names
- See also: Yoo (Korean name), Yanagi (surname)

Liǔ (Chinese: 柳; pinyin: Liǔ; Wade–Giles: Liu³, [ljòʊ]) is an East Asian surname of Chinese origin found in China, Korea, and Japan, as well as in Vietnam and throughout Southeast Asia. It is the 60th name in the Hundred Family Surnames poem.

During antiquity, the Liu family emigrated to Korea around the Silla era, where they were given them the surname Liu. The Korean spelling of the surname is usually written in English as Ryu or Yoo. In the modern era, some Japanese people have migrated throughout East Asia and adopted the surname. In Vietnam, the name is spelled Liễu.

In ancient times, Yao people with the surname Liu emigrated from Guangdong in Guangxi to Vietnam, where the spelling of the name changed from Liu to Lieu when romanised.

== Origin ==
- The Posterity of Emperor Yi of Chu adopted the surname Liu, bearing the regional name of Liu Country in Changde, Hunan, China
- Zhan Huo was given the posthumous name 柳下惠, thus believing that his descendants would receive the surname Liu
- The ancient Miao people used the surname Liu
- The ancient Yao people used the surname Liu
- During the Ming dynasty, the Yang family used the name Liu

== Notable people with this name ==
- Liu Gongquan (柳公權, 778–865) a Tang poet and calligrapher
- Liu Zongyuan (柳宗元, 773–819), a poet during the Tang dynasty
- Liu Yizheng (柳詒徵, 1880–1956) a modern historian
- Liu Zhesheng (柳哲生, 1914–1991), ace-fighter pilot of the War of Resistance/WWII for the Chinese Air Force
- Liu Chuanzhi (柳传志, born 1944) Chinese businessman, founder of Lenovo
- Liu Yan (柳岩, born 1980), actress, singer, and television personality
- Norman C.T. Liu (柳澈漯), Chinese-American businessman, Senior Advisor at ICBC Leasing, former Chairman, President & CEO of GE Commercial Aviation Services
