= Suo (surname) =

Chinese family name

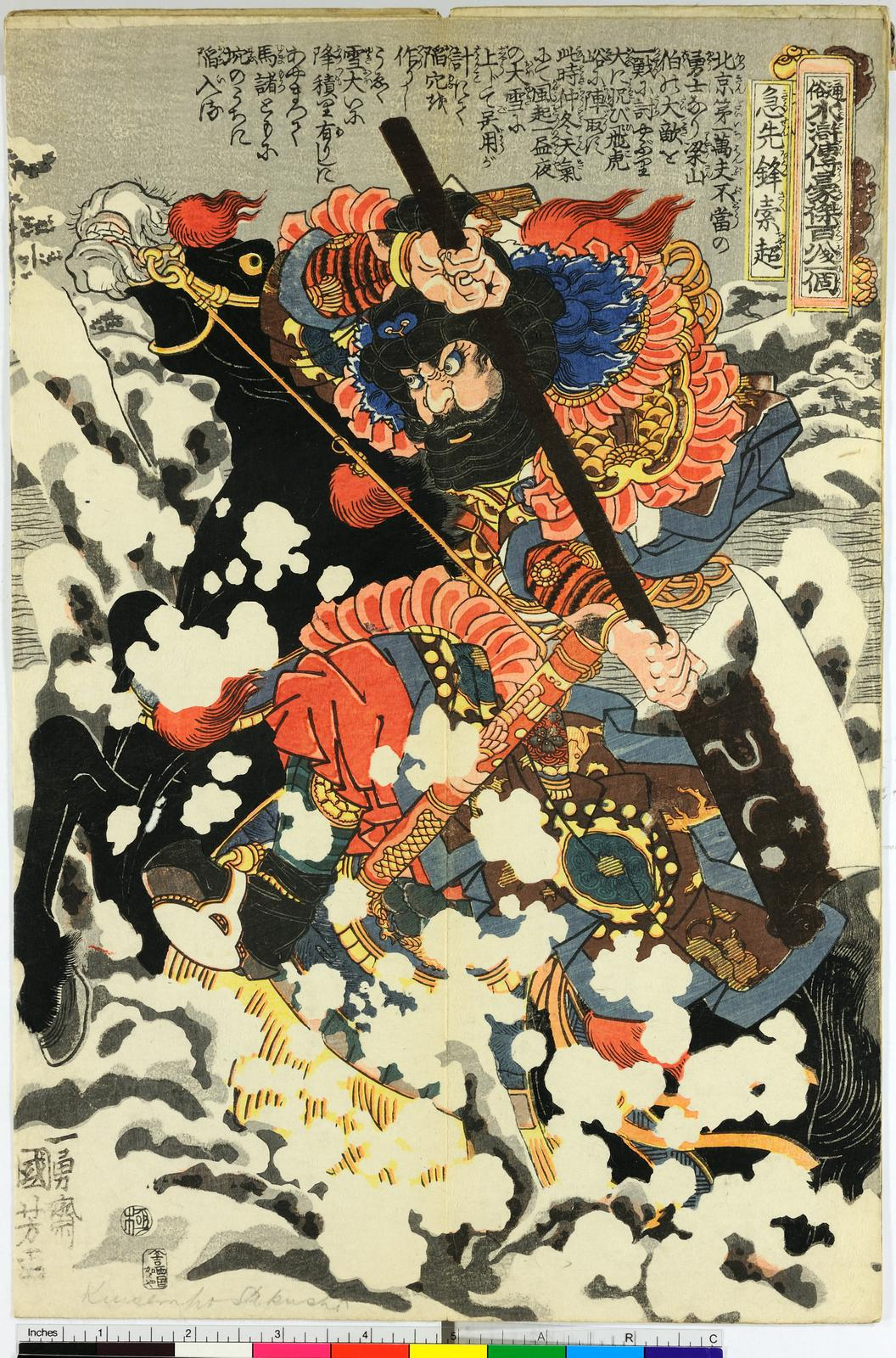
- Suo Chao (索超) from the Water Margin
- Chinese: 索
- Literal meaning: rope
Transcriptions
Standard Mandarin
- Hanyu Pinyin: Suǒ
- Wade–Giles: So^{3}
- IPA: [swò]
Yue: Cantonese
- Jyutping: Sok^{3}
Southern Min
- Hokkien POJ: Sek
Middle Chinese
- Middle Chinese: /sak/
Old Chinese
- Zhengzhang: /*slaːɡ/

Suo (索) is a Chinese surname. It is Romanized as So in Wade-Giles and Sok in Cantonese. According to a 2013 study, it was the 317th most common name in China; it was shared by 165,000 people, or 0.012% of the population, being most popular in Henan. It is the 273rd name in the Hundred Family Surnames poem.

== Origins ==
The surname is claimed to derive from a Suo state (索) located in modern Henan during the Shang period (late 2nd millennium BC), which was annexed by the Western Zhou (11th–8th centuries BC); the Suo were one of six clans of the Shang that were sent to the state of Lu after the downfall of the Shang.

== Notable people ==
- Suo Chen (索綝, died 316), Jin general
- Suo Yuanli (索元禮, died 691), Tang police official
- Suo Zhaoshiya (索趙士雅, 1905–1967), politician
- Suo Di (索敌, born 1993), badminton player
- Suo Ran (索冉, born 1994), swimmer

=== Fictional ===
- Suo Chao (索超) from the Water Margin
