= Zuo =

Surname list

- Zuo surname in regular script
- Pronunciation: Zuǒ (Pinyin); Chó (Pe̍h-ōe-jī)
- Language: Chinese

Origin
- Language: Chinese
- Meaning: "left"

Other names
- Variant forms: Zuo (Mandarin); Tso (Mandarin, Wade-Giles)

Zuo (Chinese: 左; pinyin: Zuǒ) is a Chinese surname. It is the 187th name listed on the Hundred Family Surnames poem.

== People ==
- Zuo Zongtang (左宗棠) (1812–1885), Qing dynasty Han Chinese General, the inspiration for General Tso's chicken
- Zuo Baogui (左寶貴) (1837–1894), Qing dynasty Hui Chinese General
- Zhang Zuo (pianist) (左章) (born 1989), Chinese-American pianist
- Zuo Xiaoqing (Chinese: 左小青; born 1977) Chinese actress, TV presenter and former rhythmic gymnast.
- Zuo Caiyun (born 1996), Chinese para-athlete

== See also ==
- List of common Chinese surnames
