= Wei (surname 危) =

Chinese family name

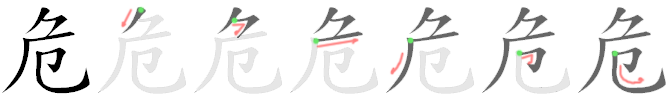
- Stroke order for 危
- Chinese: 危
- Literal meaning: danger
Transcriptions
Standard Mandarin
- Hanyu Pinyin: Wēi
- Wade–Giles: Wei^{1}
- IPA: [wéɪ]
Yue: Cantonese
- Jyutping: Ngai^{4}
Southern Min
- Hokkien POJ: Gûi
Middle Chinese
- Middle Chinese: /ngjwe/
Old Chinese
- Zhengzhang: /*ŋrol/

Wei (危) is a Chinese surname. According to a 2013 study, it was the 362nd most common name in China; it was shared by 112,000 people, or 0.0084% of the population, being most popular in Jiangxi. It is the 140th name in the Hundred Family Surnames poem.

== Origins ==
The character 危 means "dangerous," "rooftop" or "towering." The surname is traced to:

- from the placename San Wei (三危) in Gansu, to which the San Miao migrated during the reign of the legendary Emperor Shun
- descendants of Wei Su (危素) a Ming-era scholar whose original surname was Huang

== Notable people ==
- Wei Quanfeng (危全諷), Tang-era warlord
- Wei Yilin (危亦林, c. 1277–1347), Yuan-era doctor
- Wei Weihan (危伟汉, born 1965), politician

=== Fictional ===
- The Ngai (危) family from The Comeback Clan
- The Ngai (危) family from The Drive of Life
