= Ao (surname) =

Ao (敖)
- Pronunciation: Áo (Mandarin) ngou4 (Cantonese)
- Language: Chinese

Origin
- Language: Old Chinese

Other names
- Variant form: Ngo

Áo is Mandarin pinyin and Wade–Giles romanization of the Chinese surname written 敖 in Chinese character. It is romanized as Ngo in Cantonese. Ao is listed 375th in the Song dynasty classic text Hundred Family Surnames. As of 2008, it is the 261st most common surname in China, shared by 250,000 people.

In Japanese, Ao is Japanese surname written 粟生 in Chinese character.

== Notable people ==
- Ao Taosun (敖陶孫; 1154–1227), Song dynasty poet
- Ao Zongqing (敖宗慶; 16th century), Ming dynasty governor of Yunnan province
- Ao Yu-hsiang (敖幼祥; born 1956), Taiwanese cartoonist
- Ao Kuo-chu (敖國珠; born 1969), Taiwanese journalist
- Ao Long (敖龍), Cantonese opera performer and actor
- Ngo Ka-nin (born 1976), Hong Kong actor
- Ao Feifan (born 1989), football player
- Ao Ruipeng (敖瑞鹏; born 1995), Chinese actor
- Takahiro Ao (粟生 隆寛, born 1984), Japanese former professional boxer

== Mythology ==
In Chinese mythology, the Dragon Kings of the Four Seas are surnamed Ao:

- Ao Guang, Dragon King of the East Sea
- Ao Qin (敖欽), Dragon King of the South Sea
- Ao Run (敖閏), Dragon King of the West Sea
- Ao Shun (敖順), Dragon King of the North Sea
- Ao Bing (敖丙), one of Ao Guang's sons

== See also ==
- Ou, commonly romanized as Ao in Cantonese
