= Xu (surname 胥) =

Chinese family name

- Chinese: 胥
Transcriptions
Standard Mandarin
- Hanyu Pinyin: Xū
- Wade–Giles: Hsü^{1}
- IPA: [ɕú]
Yue: Cantonese
- Jyutping: Seoi^{1}
Southern Min
- Hokkien POJ: Su
Middle Chinese
- Middle Chinese: /sjo/
Old Chinese
- Zhengzhang: /*sŋa/

Xu (胥, SHOO) is a Chinese surname. It is romanized as Hsü in Wade–Giles and Seoi in Cantonese. According to a 2013 study, it was the 267th most common name in China; it was shared by 285,000 people, or 0.021% of the population, being most popular in Sichuan. It is the 285th name in the Hundred Family Surnames poem.

== Origins ==
The character 胥 means "assist," "store" or "all;" it formerly referred to a kind of low-ranking official or assistant. The surname is traced to:

- Xu Chen (胥臣), style name of an official in the state of Jin during the Spring and Autumn period (770–476 BC)
- He Xu Shi (赫胥氏), a name of the legendary Yan Emperor

== Notable people ==
- Xu Wumei (胥午梅, born 1962), news anchor
- Stefano Xu Hongwei (胥红伟, born 1975), Catholic bishop
- Xu Xu (胥栩, born 1998), footballer
