= Ru (surname) =

Ru (茹)
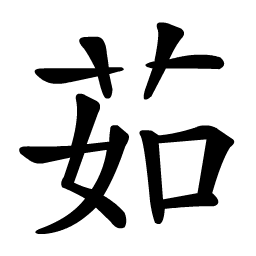
- Pronunciation: Rú (Mandarin); Yu (Cantonese)
- Language: Chinese

Origin
- Language: Old Chinese

Other names
- Variant form: Ju

Ru is the Mandarin pinyin romanization of the Chinese surname written 茹 in Chinese character. Ju is in Wade–Giles, and Yuh is romanized in Yale (Cantonese). Ru is listed 331st in the Song dynasty classic text Hundred Family Surnames. It is not among the 300 most common surnames in China.

== Notable people ==
- Ru Faliang (茹法亮; 5th century), Southern Qi dynasty official
- Ru Taisu (茹太素; died 1389), Ming dynasty Minister of Revenue
- Ru Chang (茹瑺; died 1409), Ming dynasty Minister of War
- Ru Yun (茹鈗; 1696–?), Qing dynasty general
- Ru Fen (茹棻; 1755–1821), Qing dynasty zhuangyuan and Minister of War
- Ru Zhijuan (茹志鹃; 1925–1998), novelist
- Ru Ping (茹萍; born 1966), actress
- Julian Yee Zhi Jie or Ru Zijie (茹自杰; born 1997), Malaysian figure skater
