= Luan (surname) =

Luan (栾/欒)
- Pronunciation: Luán (Mandarin)
- Language: Chinese

Origin
- Language: Old Chinese

Luan is the Mandarin pinyin and Wade–Giles romanization of the Chinese surname written 栾 in simplified Chinese and 欒 in traditional Chinese. Luan is listed 243rd in the Song dynasty classic text Hundred Family Surnames. As of 2008, it is the 226th most common surname in China, shared by 360,000 people.

== Notable people ==
- Luan Bin (欒賓; 8th century BC), minister of Huan Shu of Quwo
- Luan Cheng (欒成; died 709 BC), son of Luan Bin, minister of the State of Jin
- Luan Zhi (欒枝; died 622 BC), son of Luan Cheng, general of Jin
- Luan Dun (欒盾; 7th century BC), son of Luan Zhi, general of Jin
- Luan Shu (欒書; died 573 BC), son of Luan Dun, general of Jin
- Luan Yan (欒黶; died 556 BC), son of Luan Shu, general of Jin
- Luan Zhen (欒鍼; died 559 BC), younger brother of Luan Yan, general of Jin
- Luan Ying (欒盈; died 550 BC), son of Luan Yan, revolted against Jin
- Luan Fang (欒魴; 6th century BC), the only survivor of the Luan clan after its failed rebellion against Jin
- Luan Shi (欒施; 6th century BC), minister of the State of Qi
- Luan Bu (欒布; died 145 BC), Han dynasty general
- Luan Da (died 112 BC), Han dynasty religious figure
- Luan Ba (欒巴; died 168 AD), Eastern Han eunuch
- Jujie Luan (born 1958), Chinese-Canadian female fencer, Olympic champion
- Luan Jin (born 1958), badminton player, world champion
- Luan Bo (born 1965), female skater and coach
- Luan Yijun (栾义军; 1967–2009), football player
- Luan Keyong (欒克勇; born 1970), Taiwanese songwriter
- Luan Zheng (born 1984), female handball player
- Luan Yunping (栾云平; born 1984), xiangsheng performer
