= Ben (surname) =

Chinese family name

- The Bēn character in small seal script
- Traditional Chinese: 賁
- Simplified Chinese: 贲
Transcriptions
Standard Mandarin
- Hanyu Pinyin: Bēn
- Wade–Giles: Pên^{1}
- IPA: [pə́n]
Yue: Cantonese
- Jyutping: Ban^{1}
Southern Min
- Hokkien POJ: Hûn
Middle Chinese
- Middle Chinese: /bʉi/

Ben (trad. 賁, simp. 贲) is a Chinese surname meaning "bright, energetic". It is romanized Pên in Wade–Giles, or Ban in Cantonese romanization. According to a 2013 study, it was not one of the top 400 surnames in modern China. It is the 179th name on the Hundred Family Surnames poem.

== Origins ==
Several origins are claimed for the surname:

- from Xian Ben Fu (縣賁父) a carriage driver during the reign of Duke Zhuang of Lu (706–662 BC)
- from Hu Ben (虎賁), an official post in charge of guarding the king or the royal palace
- from the Ben Hun (賁渾), a minority ethnic group in ancient western China

== Notable people ==
- Fan Ben (died 349), Chinese politician and emperor
- Sun Ben (fl. 190s–200s), Chinese general
- Wang Ben (fl. 220s BCE), Chinese general

== See also ==
- Ben (disambiguation)#People, people with similar surnames
