= Yang (surname 羊) =

Chinese family name

- Cursive form of the 羊 character
- Chinese: 羊
- Literal meaning: sheep, goat
Transcriptions
Standard Mandarin
- Hanyu Pinyin: Yáng
- Wade–Giles: Yang^{2}
- IPA: [jǎŋ]
Yue: Cantonese
- Jyutping: Joeng^{4}
Southern Min
- Hokkien POJ: Iûⁿ
Middle Chinese
- Middle Chinese: /jɨɐŋ/
Old Chinese
- Baxter–Sagart (2014): /*ɢaŋ/
- Zhengzhang: /*laŋ/

Yang (羊) is a Chinese surname. It is romanized Joeng in Cantonese romanization. According to a 2013 study, it was the 391st most common name in China; it was shared by 136,000 people, or 0.01% of the population, being most popular in Hainan. It is the 202nd name in the Hundred Family Surnames poem.

== Origins ==
The surname is from the Chinese 羊 meaning "goat" or "sheep." Origins for the surname include:

- from yangren (羊人) the name of an official post during the Western Zhou period (1046–771 BC) who was in charge of animal sacrifices.
- A shortened form of the compound surname Yangshe (羊舌) which was originally the name of a fief (located in modern Hebei) granted to an official in the state of Jin, a great-grandson of Duke Wu of Jin (ruler of the state of Jin 716–677 BC). Some of the Yangshe clan adopted the much more common surname Yang (楊/杨).

== Notable people ==
- Yang Hu (羊祜), Jin-era general
- Yang Xianrong (羊獻容), Jin and Former Han empress
- Yang Huiyu (羊徽瑜), Jin empress
