= Zhi (surname) =

Chinese family name

- Pronunciation: Zhī (Pinyin)
- Language: Chinese, Vietnamese

Origin
- Language: Old Chinese

Other names
- Variant forms: Zhi (Mandarin, Cantonese); Chi (Vietnamese)

Zhi (Chinese: 支; pinyin: Zhī) is a Chinese family name. As of 2006, it ranks as the 163rd most common Chinese surname in Mainland China.

== Origin ==
One origin of the surname came from descendants of Zhi Fu (支父) during the Three Sovereigns and Five Emperors in ancient China.

Many non-Han Chinese groups adopted the surname Zhi. In the Qin and Han dynasties, Yuezhi immigrants simplified their names to Zhi.

== Notable people ==
=== Historical ===
- Lokaksema, a Buddhist monk who traveled to China during the Han dynasty and translated Buddhist texts into Chinese, and, as such, is an important figure in Chinese Buddhism.
- Zhidun, Buddhist monk and philosopher.
- Zhi Qian, a Buddhist monk who translated a wide range of Indian Buddhist scriptures into Chinese.
- Wang Shichong, a general of Sui dynasty who deposed Sui's last emperor Yang Tong and briefly ruled as the emperor of a succeeding state of Zheng.
- Zhi Keda, a politician in the Ming dynasty.

=== Contemporary ===
- Chi-Ming Che, a Hong Kong chemist and an academician of the Chinese Academy of Sciences.
- Zhi Bingyi, a scientist and an academician of the Chinese Academy of Sciences.
- Zhi Shuping, a politician in the People's Republic of China.
- Zhi Xinhua, a retired Chinese football player.
- Zhi Yaqi, a Chinese football player.
