= Heng Kim Song =

Singaporean editorial cartoonist

Heng Kim Song (Chinese: 王锦松; born 1963) is a Singaporean editorial cartoonist.

== Career ==
Heng was born in 1963. He studied business at Ngee Ann Polytechnic (graduating in 1983) and then became an editorial cartoonist. He won first place in Singapore's National Drawing Competition.

Since 1984, Heng has drawn editorial cartoons for Lianhe Zaobao, the largest Chinese-language newspaper in Singapore. His work was first syndicated internationally in 1991; since that time, his work has been published in The Straits Times, The New York Times, the International Herald Tribune, and Newsweek. In 2000, Heng became the first Asian to win the award for best world news cartoon at the International Political Satire Festival, held in Italy.

Singapore's major national media outlets are deferential to the national government, and "as a result, national newspapers do not carry political cartoons that caricature the country's politicians." Heng's work focuses on international, rather than domestic, politics.

A freelancer, Heng also completed commissioned work. His work was displayed in a solo exhibition entitled Heng On The World at Singapore's Arts House gallery in 2011.

In September 2014, around the time when India's Mars Orbiter Mission probe was to go into Mars orbit, the International New York Times published a cartoon by Heng Kim Song depicting a turban-wearing man with a bull knocking at the door of the "Elite Space Club" with members inside reading a newspaper with a headline about India's Mars mission. Heng received both support and criticism of the cartoon. Critics asserted that the cartoon was racist. Heng stated that the work was not intended to be racist, as critics charged, saying: "I was trying to say that India has come a long way from its humble beginnings. It used to rely on cows for transport but is now part of an elite club because it made it to Mars." Times editorial page editor Andrew Rosenthal, apologized, writing in a Facebook post:

A large number of readers have complained about a recent editorial cartoon in The International New York Times, about India's foray into space exploration. The intent of the cartoonist ... was to highlight how space exploration is no longer the exclusive domain of rich, Western countries. Mr. Heng ... uses images and text – often in a provocative way – to make observations about international affairs. We apologize to readers who were offended by the choice of images in this cartoon. Mr. Heng was in no way trying to impugn India, its government or its citizens.

According to the Straits Times, Heng's cartoons, executed in black-and-white, have a distinctive "droll" and "light-hearted" style. In addition to his editorial cartooning work, Heng is also an illustrator and greeting card designer.

== Personal life ==
Heng is married and has three sons.
