= Jū =

Chinese family name

Jū (鞠 or 居; also a variant of Zhu) is a Chinese family name.

== Notable people ==
=== 鞠 ===
- Ju Ping (鞠萍; born 1966), Chinese host
- Ju Yingzhi (鞠盈智; born 1987), Chinese-born Hong Kong footballer
- Ju Jingyi (鞠婧祎; born 1994), Chinese idol singer
- Ju Feng (鞠枫; born 1995), Chinese footballer

=== 居 ===
- Ju Wenjun (居文君; born 1991), Chinese chess player
