= Yìn (surname) =

Chinese family name

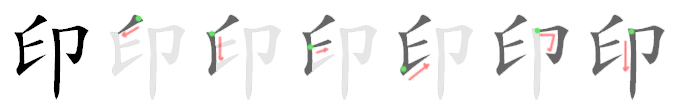
- Stroke order of the 印 character
- Chinese: 印
Transcriptions
Standard Mandarin
- Hanyu Pinyin: Yìn
- Wade–Giles: Yin^{4}
- IPA: [în]
Yue: Cantonese
- Jyutping: Jan^{3}
Southern Min
- Hokkien POJ: Ìn
Middle Chinese
- Middle Chinese: /ʔiɪn^{H}/

Yin (印) is a Chinese surname meaning "stamp" or "seal". According to a 2013 study, it was the 355th most common name in China; it was shared by 121,000 people, or 0.0091% of the population, with the province with the most people being Jiangsu. It is the 265th name in the Hundred Family Surnames poem.

== Origins ==
The surname originates with Zi Yin (子印), the courtesy name of Lun, son of Duke Mu of Zheng (ruled 627–606 BC).

== Notable people ==
- Yin Shun (印順), monk
- Yin Qing (印青), composer
- Luna Yin (印子月), C-pop singer
- Yin Yijun (印毅俊), canoeist
