= Qiao (surname) =

Family name

Qiáo (simplified Chinese: 乔; traditional Chinese: 喬; pinyin: Qiáo; Wade–Giles: Ch'iao^{2}; Jyutping: kiu4) is the 96th most common last name in China. The Qiaos are descendants of the Ji (姬) family. This name was named after a mountain. According to the legend, the ancient king Huang Di was buried in mountain of Qiao Shan (Huangling in Shaanxi). Some of Huang Di's descendants were responsible for taking care of his grave, and they eventually adopted Qiao as their last name, originally using "橋" before changing to "喬" later. Many people with this South of Shangqiu in Henan Province.

During the Three Kingdoms, there were two famous Qiao sisters who were known for their beauty. The older sister, Daqiao, was married to Sun Ce, a founder of Wu kingdom. The younger sister, Xiaoqiao, was married to the famous general Zhou Yu.

== Alternate spellings ==
- Chiao
- Kiu

== Notable people ==
- Tien Kieu, Vietnamese Australian politician
- Roy Chiao (喬宏 1927–1999) was a British Hong Kong-era Chinese actor
- Qiao Renliang (乔任梁 1987– 2016), also known as Kimi Qiao, Chinese singer and actor
- Qiao Xuan (橋玄, 110 – 6 June 184), courtesy name Gongzu, official who lived during the Eastern Han dynasty of China
- Qiao Mao (橋瑁, died 190), courtesy name Yuanwei, official and minor warlord who lived during the late Eastern Han dynasty of China

== See also ==
- Qiao Family Compound
- Takashi, Japanese masculine given name
