= Zhangsun (surname) =

Zhangsun was a Chinese compound surname often of Xianbei origin. People with this surname included:

- Zhangsun Sheng (552–609), diplomat and general of Sui dynasty
- Zhangsun Shunde (565–631), general of the Tang dynasty
- Empress Zhangsun (601–636), first empress consort of the Tang dynasty
- Zhangsun Wuji (died 659), prime minister of the Tang dynasty and Empress Zhangsun's brother
