= Zong (surname) =

Zong is the pinyin romanization of the Chinese surname written 宗. The Wade-Giles transliteration is Tsung.

Zong is also a Cantonese-derived spelling for the surname Zhuang (庄/莊).

According to a 2013 study it was the 217th most common surname, shared by 450,000 people or 0.034% of the population, with Jiangsu being the province with the most people.

== People with the surname ==
- Zong Ai (宗愛) (died 452), Northern Wei eunuch
- Zong Bing (宗炳) (375–444), Chinese artist and musician
- Zong Chen (宗臣) (1525–1560), Ming dynasty scholar-official
- Zong Chuke (宗楚客) (d. 710), Tang dynasty chancellor
- Zong Lei (宗磊) (b. 1981), Chinese footballer
- Zong Pu (宗璞) (b. 1928), Chinese writer and scholar
- Zong Qinghou (宗庆后) (1945–2024), Chinese entrepreneur
- Zong Qinke (宗秦客) (d. 691), Tang dynasty official
- Zong Xiangqing (宗祥慶) (b. 1960), Chinese Olympic fencer
- Zong Yu (宗預) (d. 263), Three Kingdoms general
- Connie Chung (宗毓華 Zōng Yùhuá), American news anchor and journalist
- Zong Zoua Her, ethnic Hmong leader
- Zong Xiao Chen (宗笑尘) (born 1998), Chinese professional darts player
