= Jing (name) =

- Language: Mandarin, Cantonese

Origin
- Language: Old Chinese

Jing is an East Asian surname and given name of Chinese origin. It is also the pinyin romanization of a number of less-common names including Jīng (京), Jīng (荆), Jīng (t 經, s 经), Jǐng (井), and Jǐng (景), etc.

== Surname 景 (Jǐng) ==
- Jing Junhai (景俊海; 1960-) Chinese politician, serving since 2018 as the Governor of Jilin
- Jing Haipeng (景海鹏, 1966-) Chinese pilot and astronaut selected as part of the Shenzhou program.

== Surname 井 (Jǐng) ==
- Jing Boran (井柏然; 1989-), Chinese actor and singer
- Jing Junhong (井浚泓, 1968-), Chinese former professional table tennis player
- Jing Yuexiu (井岳秀, 1878–1936), Chinese Warlord of Shaanxi during Warlord Era

== Surname 经 (Jīng) ==
- Jing Shuping (Chinese: 经叔平, 1918 – 2009), Chinese businessman and banker

== Surname 荊 (Jīng) ==
- Jing Ke (荊軻, ? – 227 BC) a retainer of Crown Prince Dan of the Yan state and renowned for his failed assassination attempt of King Zheng of the Qin state

== Given name ==
- Jing Lee (born 1967), Australian-Malaysian politician
- Jing Tian-Zörner (born 1963), Chinese-born German table tennis player

== See also ==
- Jing: King of Bandits, Japanese manga series
