= Qiang (name) =

Qiang is a transliteration of multiple Chinese given names and a surname.

Notable people with these names include:

== Given name ==
- Chi Qiang, Chinese competitive sailor
- Qiang Du, Chinese mathematician and computational scientist
- Gao Qiang, Chinese politician
- Huang Qiang, Chinese-Malaysian diver
- Jin Qiang, Chinese footballer
- Li Qiang (disambiguation), multiple people
- Liu Qiang, Chinese boxer
- Qin Qiang (athlete), Chinese track and field athlete
- Shen Qiang, Canadian table tennis player of Chinese origin
- Song Qiang, Chinese essayist
- Wang Qiang (disambiguation), multiple people
- Wen Qiang, Chinese judicial official
- Xiao Qiang, Chinese journalist
- Qiang Yang, Chinese scientist
- Ye Qiang, Chinese handball player
- Zhou Qiang, President of the Supreme People's Court of China

== Surname ==
- Qiang Wei, Chinese politician

== See also ==
- Jiang (surname) (彊/强), a Chinese surname for which Qiang is an alternate transliteration
