= Qú =

Qu Chinese: 瞿; pinyin: Qú is a Chinese surname. The surname Qu (瞿) is listed among the Hundred Family Surnames (Chinese: 百家姓) book of common Chinese surnames, compiled during the Song dynasty.

== Notable people ==
Notable people with the surname include:

- Annie Qu (瞿培勇), Professor of Statistics, University of California, Irvine
- Qu You (瞿佑, 1341–1427), a Chinese novelist who lived in the Ming dynasty
- Qu Qiubai (瞿秋白, 1899–1935), Chinese writer, poet, translator, and political activist Qu Qiubai
- Qu Ying (瞿颖, 1971-), Chinese model and actress Qu Ying

== See also ==
- Chinese Surnames
- Han Chinese
