= Gou (surname) =

Chinese surname

Gou (Chinese: 苟; pinyin: gǒu) is a Chinese surname. In 2013, it was the 225th-most common surname, shared by around 430,000 people, comprising 0.032% of the total population, with the province with the most people sharing the surname being Sichuan.

== Notable people ==
- Christine Kuo (Chinese: 苟芸慧; pinyin: Gǒu Yúnhuì, 1983-) a Taiwanese-Canadian actress based in Hong Kong
- Empress Gou (苟皇后, personal name unknown) an empress of the Chinese/Di state Former Qin. Her husband was Fu Jiān
- Gou Zhongwen (Chinese: 苟仲文; born June 1957) is a Chinese politician, serving since 2017 as the director of the State General Administration of Sports

== See also ==
- Terry Gou, (郭台銘, Guo Taiming) Chairman and CEO of Foxconn (Hon Hai Technology Group)
