= Xie (surname 解) =

Xiè is the pinyin romanization of the surname 解. The character 解 is also pronounced "Jiě". A 2013 study found that it was the 182nd-most common surname, shred by 710,000 people or 0.053% of the population, with Shandong being the province with the most.

== Notable people ==
- Xie Feng, politician
- Xie Jin, mandarin
- Xie Zhenhua, politician
- Xie Jingxian (Chinese: 解静娴; pinyin: Xiè Jìngxián) (born October 31, 1983), Chinese pianist
- Xie Zhong (Chinese: 解众; born September 19, 1998), Chinese pair skater
- Xie Xuegong (Chinese: 解学恭; Wade–Giles: Hsieh Hsueh-kung; October 6, 1913–March 3, 1993), Chinese politician, also known as Xie Bin (Chinese: 谢宾)
- Xie Fei (Chinese: 解飛; fl. 334–349), Chinese inventor and scholar of the Later Zhao
- Chieh Yuan (1945–1977), Malaysian-born Hong Kong actor and martial artist

=== Fictional ===
- Xie Bao, a character in Water Margin
