= Yīn (surname 陰) =

Chinese family name

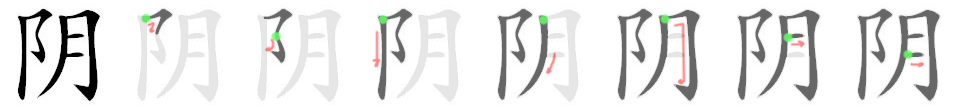
- Stroke order of 阴, the Simplified form of the Yīn character.
- Traditional Chinese: 陰
- Simplified Chinese: 阴
- Literal meaning: darkness (yin)
Transcriptions
Standard Mandarin
- Hanyu Pinyin: Yīn
- Wade–Giles: Yin^{1}
- IPA: [ín]
Yue: Cantonese
- Jyutping: Jam^{1}
Southern Min
- Hokkien POJ: Im
Middle Chinese
- Middle Chinese: ˑiəm
Old Chinese
- Zhengzhang: /*qrɯm/

Yīn (trad. 陰, simp. 阴) is a Chinese surname. It is Romanized as Im in Min Nan and Yam in Cantonese. According to a 2013 study, it was the 390th most common name in China; it was shared by 39,000 people, or 0.0067% of the population, being most popular in Shanxi. It is the 283rd name in the Hundred Family Surnames poem.

It should not be confused with the much more popular surname Yīn (殷), whose name comes from the Shang capital of Yin.

== Origins ==
The surname Yin is claimed to derive from one of:

- from the personal name of Yin Jing (陰兢), an official in the late Shang dynasty (late 2nd millennium BC)
- from the placename Yin (陰), a fief located in modern Henan during the Western Zhou (11th–8th centuries BC)
- from Yin Dafu (陰大夫 "Yin Counsellor"), a title given to Guan Xiu, a descendant of philosopher Guan Zhong

== Notable people ==
- Yin Lihua (陰麗華, AD 5–64), empress, wife of Emperor Guangwu of Han
- Yin Changsheng (陰長生, AD 120–210), Daoist xian ("transcendent; immortal")
- Yin Hejun (阴和俊; born 1963), politician and engineer
- Yin Fatang (阴法唐; 1922–2025), Chinese military officer and politician
