= Shuai =

Shuài (帥) is a Chinese surname. Shi (師 OC: /*sri/) was changed to Shuai (帥 OC: /*sruds/, *srud/) to avoid conflict with the name of Sima Shi, a military general and regent of Cao Wei during the Three Kingdoms period of China, who is regarded as Emperor Jing of the Jin dynasty. Shuai is the 298th most common surname in China.

Notable people with the surname Shuai include:

- Bei Bei Shuai, Chinese immigrant
- Shuai Mengqi (1897–1998), Chinese politician
- Shuai Weihao (born 2009), Chinese footballer

== See also ==
- Shuai jiao
- Yuan shuai
  - Da yuan shuai
