= Wen (surname 闻) =

Chinese surname

Wén (simplified Chinese: 闻; traditional Chinese: 聞) is a Chinese surname. It is related to the name Wenren (Wenjen).

闻 (Wén), meaning "fame" or "to listen", shares its origin with 文 (Wén) and usually romanised in a similar way. It may be romanised as Man in Cantonese, Wen, Boon, Vun, or Voon in Taiwan, Văn in Vietnamese.

286th most common name, shared by 210,700 people or 0.016% of the population, the province with the most being Anhui.

== Notable people ==
- Wen Yiduo, politician and nationalist poet assassinated by the KMT
- Wen Yumei (闻玉梅; born 1934) a Chinese virologist and microbiologist and the current director of the Institute of Pathogenic Microorganisms, Fudan University.
- Wen Zhong (Investiture of the Gods)
