= Dongfang (surname) =

- Dongfang in regular script
- Pronunciation: Tong-hong (Pe̍h-ōe-jī)

Origin
- Language: Chinese language
- Origin: Fu Xi clan Dongfang Shuo
- Meaning: the east

Other names
- Variant form: Dongfang (Mandarin)
- See also: Zhang (surname)

Dongfang
- Traditional Chinese: 東方
- Simplified Chinese: 东方
Transcriptions
Standard Mandarin
- Hanyu Pinyin: Dōngfāng
- Bopomofo: ㄉㄨㄥ ㄈㄤ
Yue: Cantonese
- Jyutping: dung^{1} fong^{1}
Southern Min
- Hokkien POJ: Tong-hong

Dongfang is a compound surname in China and also later spread into East Asia. Dongfang has two points of origin. One branch is said to be descended from the Fuxi clan, which originated in the east; the other is said to be descended from Dongfang Shuo, whose original family name was Zhang.

Dongfang is the 119th surname in Hundred Family Surnames.

== Notable people named Dongfang ==
- Dongfang Shuo, poet during the Han dynasty
- Dongfang Qiu, poet and historian during the Tang dynasty
- Dongfang Xian, scholar during the Tang dynasty
- Dongfang Bubai, fictional character from The Smiling, Proud Wanderer
