= Mou (surname) =

Móu (牟) is a Chinese surname.

== Notable people ==
- Mou Zongsan (Chinese: 牟宗三; pinyin: Móu Zōngsān; Wade–Giles: Mou Tsung-san, 1909–1995), Chinese New Confucian philosopher
- Mou Tun-fei (牟敦芾, 1941–2019), Chinese filmmaker
- Mou Shantao (born 1990), Chinese footballer
