= Shang (surname) =

Shang (Chinese: 尚; pinyin: shàng) is a Chinese surname. According to a 2013 study, it was the 141st-most common surname shared by 1,009,000 people or 0.082% of the population of China, with the province with the most people being Henan. It means "esteem."

== Origins ==
- from the given name of Jiang Shang (姜尚) or Shang Fu (尚父), known as Jiang Ziya, a revered official during the Western Zhou dynasty, who was the ancestor of the kings of the Qi. He helped King Wu of Zhou overthrow the Shang dynasty. Some of his descendants inherited his given name as their surname.
- from the personal name of Shang Kegu (尚可孤), who was from the Xianbei people in the Tang dynasty.

== Notable people ==
- Shang Rang, (尚讓; died c. 884), Chinese agrarian rebel during the Tang dynasty; follower of Huang Chao
- Shang Kexi, (尚可喜; 1604–1676), Qing dynasty general and Prince of Pingnan
- Shang Zhixin, (尚之信; 1636–1680), Qing dynasty general and Prince of Pingnan who rebelled in the Revolt of the Three Feudatories; Son of Shang Kexi
- Shang Yang (artist) (Chinese: 尚扬; born 1942, former name Shang Nengquan), a contemporary Chinese painter based in Beijing and is considered one of the most important painters of the life-stream movement
- Shang Wenjie (尚雯婕; born 1982), also known as Laure Shang, Chinese singer
