= Bie (surname) =

Bie (simplified Chinese: 别; traditional Chinese: 別; pinyin: Bié) is a Chinese surname listed in the Hundred Family Surnames. It is also romanized as Pit.

Its choronym or clan identifier (郡望) is Jingzhao Commandery, in what is now Shaanxi.

== Notable people ==
- Bie Biliang (born 1967), politician
- Bie Bixiong (born 1962), politician
- Bie Ge (born 1992), sprinter
- Bie Ronghai (born 1968), politician
- Bie Shengxue (born 1952), politician
- Bie Tingfang (1883–1940), soldier
- Torres Pit or Pit Hung-yau (born 1996), YouTuber
- Bie Zhijie (died 1253), Song dynasty politician
- Bie Zuhou (1912–1981), soldier
