= Feng Yunhe =

Chinese politician

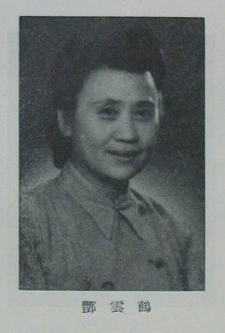

Feng Yunhe (1898/ April 1900 – 14 December 1988) was a Chinese scientist who worked in the Chinese government from 1949–1954 as the Minister of Textile Industry. Alongside Shi Liang and Li Dequan, who were appointed the same year, she was the first female cabinet minister in China (not counting He Xiangning, who served prior to unification). Feng Yunhe was an expert in ramie fibre. She was one of the founders of the China National Democratic Construction Association, one of the eight legally recognised minor political parties in the People's Republic of China. She was the first woman on record to earn a PhD in chemical engineering in the United States.

== Early life and education ==
Feng Yunhe hailed from Lijin, Shandong Province in China. She attended primary and secondary school at the Jinan Girls' Junior Normal School and the Beijing Girls' Higher Normal School. In 1920 she was admitted to the United States to study chemical engineering at Ohio State University, where she received her master's degree in 1928 and her doctorate in chemical engineering in 1931, making her the first woman to obtain a doctoral degree in chemical engineering in the United States. Whilst in America, she was known as Yun Hao Feng or Ruth Feng. In 1930 she and Mary Bucher were members of the American Institute of Chemical Engineers Student Chapter in Ohio, the first cohort group to allow female membership.

== Career ==
After graduating, she returned to China and taught at Yanjing University, where she went to the University of Berlin, Germany in 1933 to conduct research on rayon and invented the first rayon made from grass fibres, returning to China in 1936 to serve as a commissioner of the Central Economic Commission. In 1938 she moved to Chongqing to set up the Southwest Chemical Industry Manufacturing Factory, where she conducted research on ramie processing and eventually spun out the "Cloud Silk", known as Yunsi fiber. In 1949, she attended the first plenary session of the Chinese People's Political Consultative Conference.

After the founding of the People's Republic of China, Feng Yunhe became an advisor to the Ministry of Textile Industry and Deputy Director of the Guangdong Chemical Research Institute, and in 1951, she began researching the chemical denaturation of ramie fibres, which was successful after five years of experiments. During the Cultural Revolution, she was branded as a "reactionary academic authority". After the end of the Cultural Revolution, she became a consultant to the Shanghai Textile Industry Bureau's Wool and Hemp Textile Industry Company and joined the Chinese Communist Party in 1979. She was awarded the invention prize by the State Science and Technology Commission in 1981 for the development of a large number of ramie fibre sulphonation denaturation products in Shanghai, and was a technical advisor to Hubei Province on textile technology from 1984.

== Political positions ==
Feng Yunhe was a member of the First to Third National People's Congress, a member of the Standing Committee of the Fifth National Committee of the Chinese People's Political Consultative Conference and a member of the Sixth National Committee of the Chinese People's Political Consultative Conference.

Feng Yunhe died in Guangzhou in on 14 December 1988 at the age of 89.
