= Gui (surname) =

Gui (Chinese: 桂; pinyin: Guì or simplified Chinese: 归; traditional Chinese: 歸; pinyin: Guī), or Kwai (Jyutping: Gwai^{1}) in Cantonese, is a Chinese surname. Notable people with this surname include:

- Gui Minhai (桂敏海 or 桂民海; born 1964), Chinese-born Swedish book publisher and writer
- Gwei Lun-mei (桂綸鎂; born 1983), Taiwanese actress
- Gui Hong (桂宏; born 1995), Chinese footballer
- Gua Ah-leh (歸亞蕾; born 1944), Taiwanese actress and singer
- Gui Haichao (桂海潮), Chinese astronaut
- Nancy Kwai (歸綽嶢; born 2000), Hong Kong singer and actress
