= Ximen =

- Ximen in regular script
- Pronunciation: Xīmén (Pinyin); Se-mn̂g (Pe̍h-ōe-jī)
- Language: Chinese

Origin
- Language: Chinese language
- Meaning: western gate

Other names
- Variant form: (Mandarin)
- See also: Xi (surname)

Ximen (simplified Chinese: 西门; traditional Chinese: 西門; pinyin: Xīmén) is a Chinese compound surname. Ximen literally means "west gate", the origination story says that there was a noble family in Zheng or Qi state live near the west gate, so the descendants took Ximen (west gate) as their family name. As compound surnames are rare in China, some Ximen families have changed their name to the single surname Xi(西).

== Notable people named Ximen ==
- Ximen Bao, minister and court advisor in Wei
- Ximen Qing, fictional character in Water Margin and The Plum in the Golden Vase
- Ximen Chuixue, fictional character in The Legend of Lu Xiaofeng
- Ximen Yan, fictional character in Meteor Garden (2018 TV series)
- Ximen Nao (西门闹), fictional main character in Life and Death Are Wearing Me Out by Mo Yan
