= Xuan (surname) =

Hsuan / Xuan (宣)
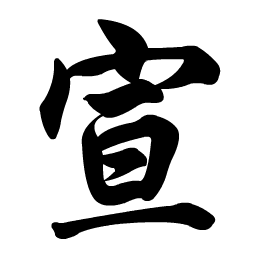
- Pronunciation: Xuān (Mandarin)
- Language: Chinese

Origin
- Language: Old Chinese

Other names
- Variant forms: Hsüan, Hsuan, Seon (Korean)

Xuan ([ɕɥɛ́n]) is the Mandarin pinyin romanization of the Chinese surname written 宣 as a Chinese character. It is romanized Hsüan in Wade–Giles. It is not among the top 300 most common Chinese surnames.

== Notable people ==
- Xuan Zeng (宣缯); fl. early 13th century), high minister of the Southern Song dynasty
- Xuan Xiafu (宣侠父; 1899–1938), Communist agent assassinated by the KMT
- Xuan Jinglin (宣景琳; 1907–1992), actress
- Hsuan Ming-chih (宣明智; born 1952), former general manager of UMC
- Jessica Hsuan or Xuan Xuan (born 1970), Hong Kong actress
- Xuan Zan, fictional character in the classical novel Water Margin
