= Xiang (surname) =

Xiang is the pinyin romanization of the Chinese surnames: Xiàng (Chinese: 向; Xiàng) and Xiāng (Chinese: 相). It means “to go forward”

It originated from several sources. First, from Xiang, an ancient state (located in Shandong province), destroyed in the early Spring and Autumn period. Secondly from Xiang, an ancient state located in Henan province, which was destroyed in the late Western Zhou dynasty. Thirdly from the first character of the personal name Xiang Fu (向父), the style name of Bi, son of the Duke Huan in the state of Song.

== Notable people ==
- Xiang Hantian (向汉天)
- Xiang Huaqiang, better known as Charles Heung (向華強)
- Xiang Jingyu (向警予)
- Xiang Rong (向榮)
- Xiang Xuan (向轩)
- Xiang Zhongfa (向忠發)
- Xiang Zhejun (向哲浚)
- Ning Xiang (向宁), Chinese American acoustics expert
- Xiang Chong (向寵) general and politician of the state of Shu Han
- Bruce Yu-lin Hsiang (向玉麟; born 1979) better known as GamerBee, a Taiwanese professional fighting games player
- Jacky Heung Cho (Chinese: 向佐) Hong Kong actor. He is the elder son of Charles Heung.

== See also ==
- Xiang
- Xiang Xiu
