= Margaret Heng =

Singaporean businesswoman (born 1961)

Margaret Heng (Chinese: 邢紫薇; pinyin: Xíng Zǐwēi; born 1961) is a Singaporean businesswoman. She is the chief executive officer of Shatec and the current executive director of the Singapore Hotel Association. Born 1961 in Singapore, Heng is an alumna of Raffles Girls' School, National Junior College, University of Western Ontario, and George Washington University. She is married and has two children.

== Early life ==
Heng was born 1961 in Singapore to foodhouse owner Heng Kok San and his wife Kim Lan (née Jee), a homemaker. Heng has four siblings – three brothers Jimmy, Henry and Richard and one sister Alice. Heng attended Raffles Girls' School and National Junior College. She studied finance and administration at the University of Western Ontario, graduating in 1983. Heng also holds a master's degree in Human Resource Development from the George Washington University.

== Career ==
Originally joining Shatec in 1984 as an administrator in expenditure, Heng is now the CEO of Shatec, an educational institution specialising in teaching various job skills, a position she has held since December 2011. She is also the Singapore Hotel Association (SHA)'s current executive director. A member of Singapore's National Crime Prevention Council, Heng was part of the 2012 Singapore Service Excellence Medallion Management Committee.

== Personal life ==
Heng's spouse is polytechnic administrative manager Siow Chow Sid (born 1959). They have two daughters Cheryl (born 1988) and Clare (born 1992), the former being a businesswoman in the retail industry. Heng claims to not have a "lavish taste in food" and leads a simple lifestyle, choosing to dine in at local food centres as opposed to hotel restaurants.
