= Ma (surname 麻) =

Chinese family name

Chinese name
- Chinese: 麻
- Literal meaning: hemp
Transcriptions
Standard Mandarin
- Hanyu Pinyin: Má
- Wade–Giles: Ma^{2}
- IPA: [mǎ]
Yue: Cantonese
- Jyutping: Maa^{4}
Southern Min
- Hokkien POJ: Môa
Middle Chinese
- Middle Chinese: /mae/
Old Chinese
- Zhengzhang: /*mraːl/

Vietnamese name
- Vietnamese: Ma

Ma (麻) is a Chinese surname. According to a 2013 study, it was the 253rd most common name in China; it was shared by 330,000 people, or 0.025% of the population, being most popular in Zhejiang. It is the 135th name in the Hundred Family Surnames poem.

It should not be confused with Mǎ (马/馬) ("horse"), one of the most common surnames in China.

== Origins ==
The character 麻 denotes a plant, usually hemp, sesame or flax. The surname is traced to the Spring and Autumn Period (8th–5th centuries BC), being derived from either of:

- Ma (麻), the name of a fief located in Macheng, Hubei, which was granted to an official of the state of Chu
- Ma Ying (麻婴), an official in the state of Qi

== Notable people ==
- Ma Qiu (麻秋, d. AD 350), Later Zhao and Former Qin general
- Ma Gui (麻贵, 1543–1617), Ming general
- Ma Zhenjun (麻振军, born 1962), PLAAF general
- Xiaonan Ma (麻小南, born 1962), mathematician
- Ma Jingyi (麻敬宜, born 1995), curler
- Sanggok Ma clan, a Korean clan
