= Leng (surname) =

Leng (冷)
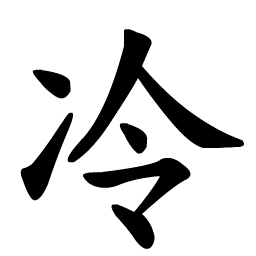
- Pronunciation: Lěng (Mandarin)
- Language: Chinese

Origin
- Language: Old Chinese
- Meaning: “cold”

Leng is the Mandarin pinyin and Wade–Giles romanization of the Chinese surname written 冷 in Chinese character and Vietnamese surname written Lãnh. It is listed 377th in the Song dynasty classic text Hundred Family Surnames. As of 2008, it is the 246th most common surname in China, shared by 300,000 people.

== Notable people ==
- Leng Bao (冷苞; 3rd century AD), Han dynasty general
- Yangqi Fanghui (杨岐方会; 992 – ca. 1049), lay surname Leng, founder of the Yangqi Sect of Chan Buddhism
- Leng Mei (冷枚, 17th–18th century), painter
- Leng Yu (冷遹; 1882–1959), Vice Governor of Jiangsu province
- Leng Jiaji (冷家骥; 1899–1957), businessman and politician
- Leng Xin (冷欣; 1900–1987), Lieutenant General of the Republic of China
- Leng Pengfei (冷鹏飞; born 1933), PLA war hero and major general
- Leng Kuan (冷宽; born 1938), Vice Admiral of the PLA Navy
- Leng Rong (冷溶; born 1953), Vice President of the Chinese Academy of Social Sciences
- Leng Xueyan (冷雪艳 born 1972), runner, Asian Games gold medalist
