= Linghu =

- Lingu in regular script
- Pronunciation: Línghú (Mandarin)
- Language: Chinese

Origin
- Language: Chinese language
- Origin: General Wei Ke (魏颗)
- Derivation: City of Linghu, Zhou dynasty

Linghu (Chinese: 令狐; pinyin: Línghú) is a Chinese compound surname. During the Zhou dynasty, a general, Wei Ke (魏顆) scored many victories for Zhou and was granted the city of Linghu. All his descendants took the compound surname Linghu.

== Notable people ==
- Bruce Linghu (born 1954), Taiwanese politician and diplomat
- Linghu An (born 1946), Chinese politician
- Linghu Chu (766–837), an official of the Tang dynasty
- Linghu Defen (583–666), a historian-official of the Tang dynasty
- Linghu Tao (795–872), an official of the Tang dynasty
- Ling Jihua (Chinese: 令计划; born 1956, originally Linghu Jihua) former Chinese politician as one of the principal political advisers of former leader Hu Jintao
- Fictional: Linghu Chong, the protagonist in Louis Cha's wuxia novel The Smiling, Proud Wanderer
