= Pei (surname) =

Pei (裴)
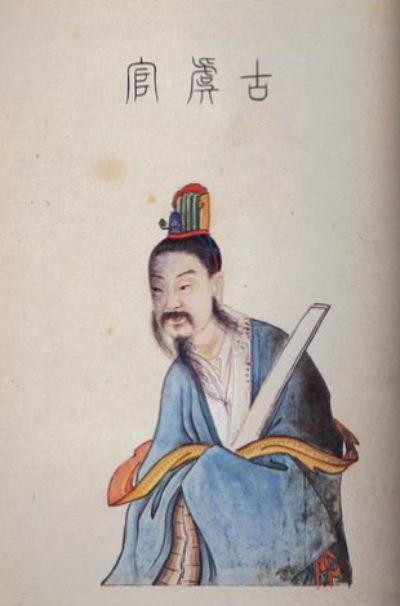
- Bo Yi, the leader of Dongyi people and helper of Yu the Great, was described as the ancestor of surnames Ying and Pei in Chinese history
- Pronunciation: Péi (Mandarin)
- Language: Chinese

Origin
- Language: Old Chinese

The surname Pei in China is strongly associated with southeast Shanxi. The most prominent Pei clan of Hedong originated from here, and Shanxi used to be the region having the most people with Pei as their surname in ancient times.

Pei (Chinese: 裴; pinyin: Péi) is an East Asian surname originating in north China. In 2008, it was the 156th most common surname in mainland China, with at least 830,000 Chinese sharing this surname.

There are also people with this surname based on the same Chinese letter in Vietnam (as Bùi), where it is in relative terms much more common (the 9th most common surname), and Korea (as Bae; 배).

The surname Lei (壘) was accidentally created from Pei as a result of a transcription error.

By coincidence, "Pei" is also an Italian surname (of two syllables), whose meaning may derive from the pear or pear tree, or alternatively, represent an abbreviation of "Pietro" or "Pompeo."

== Notable people ==
=== Historical figures ===
- Pei clan of Hedong
- Pei Di (Tang) poet and official
- Pei Ji (Sui and Tang) Official and Chancellor of the Tang Dynasty
- Pei Ju Official of the Sui Dynasty and Chancellor of the Tang Dynasty
- Pei Songzhi (372–451), Liu Song dynasty historian
- Pei Xiu (224–271), minister, geographer, and cartographer during the Three Kingdoms and Jin Dynasty
- Pei Yan (died 684), Tang dynasty official

=== China ===
- Carl Pei (born Péi Yǔ; 1989–), Chinese-born Swedish entrepreneur
- Pei Rongfu (1924–2025), Chinese engineer
- Pei Wenzhong (1904–1982), anthropologist

=== Italy ===
- Mario Pei (1901–1978), linguist
