= Yi (surname 伊) =

Chinese surname 伊

- Language: Chinese

Origin
- Language: Old Chinese

Other names
- Variant forms: Yi, Yih (Mandarin)

Yī (Chinese: 伊; pinyin: Yī) is a Chinese surname. It is also rarely spelled as Yih in Wade–Giles. According to a 2013 study, it was found to be the 289th most common surname, shared by 206,000 people or 0.016% of the population, with the province with the most being Shandong.

== Notable people ==
- Yi Ji (伊籍, fl. 200s–221), courtesy name Jibo, was an official serving in the state of Shu Han during the Three Kingdoms period of China
- Yi Hai (伊海; 1698 – c. 1747) was a Chinese painter and merchant who frequented the Japanese trading port of Nagasaki
- Yi Bingshou (伊秉绶) (1754–1815), Chinese calligrapher and political figure
- Yi Ling (伊玲, formerly 钱今凡, born 1928) is the oldest living transgender woman in China
- Yi Yi (actress) (伊一; born 1989 in Yongzhou, Hunan) is a Chinese actress and host
