= Lushi (book) =

History written by Luo Mi/Bi

- Author: Luo Mi/Luo Bi
- Original title: 路史
- Language: Classical Chinese
- Subject: Chinese history and mythology
- Publication date: 12th century
- Publication place: Southern Song Dynasty China

The Lushi (路史, Grand History), is an unofficial history of China written by Southern Song Dynasty scholar Luo Mi or Luo Bi (罗泌; 1131 – c. 1189), with key assistance from his son Luo Ping (罗苹). As Lushi interpolates historical facts with legends and folklore collected from Taoist and divinational scriptures, its reliability has been disputed by historians. However, it is a valuable work for the study of ancient Chinese mythology. The extant version of Lushi was assembled by the later scholars based on Luo's work.
