= Qu (surname 曲) =

Chinese family name

Qu (Chinese: 曲; pinyin: Qū). While the character 曲 is often pronounced Qǔ (third tone) in Modern Mandarin, the surname is pronounced Qū in the first tone. It is written Khúc in Vietnamese.

== Notable people ==
- Wanting Qu (Chinese: 曲婉婷, born 1983) simply known as Wanting, Chinese-born singer-songwriter and pianist
- Khúc Thừa Dụ (Chinese: 曲承裕; pinyin: Qū Chéngyù) or Khúc Tiên Chủ (曲先主; Qū Xiānzhǔ) (?–907), Vietnamese Jiedushi of Vietnam and Jinghai-jun (Tĩnh Hải quân), in the early 10th century
- Qu Bo (Chinese: 曲波, born 1981), retired Chinese footballer
- Qu Yunxia (simplified Chinese: 曲云霞 born 1972), Chinese Olympic athlete who specialized in the 1500 metres
- Qu Bo (writer) (Chinese: 曲波; pinyin: Qū Bō; 1923–2002), Chinese novelist
- Qu Tongfeng (Chinese: 曲同丰; pinyin: Qǔ Tóngfēng; Wade–Giles: Ch'ü^{3} T'ung^{2}-feng^{1} 1873–1929), general who served Yuan Shikai and the Anhui clique
- Qu Xiaohui (Chinese: 曲晓辉; born 1987), Chinese football player
- Qu Feifei (simplified Chinese: 曲飞飞; traditional Chinese: 曲飛飛; pinyin: Qǔ Fēifēi; born 1982), Chinese football (soccer) player who competed at the 2004 Summer Olympics

== See also ==
- Khúc clan
- Chinese Surnames
- Han Chinese
- Kinh people
