= Xiong Li =

- Ruler of Chu
- Reign: 11th century BCE
Full name
- Clan name: 姓 Ancestral temple surname: Mǐ (羋); 氏 Lineage surname: Xióng (熊); Given name: Lì (麗)

Xiong Li (Chinese: 熊麗, reigned 11th century BCE) was an early ruler of the state of Chu during or possibly prior to the early Zhou dynasty of ancient China. He succeeded his father Yuxiong, who was the teacher of King Wen of Zhou, the first king of Zhou. Xiong Li's ancestral surname was Mi (芈), but he adopted the second character of his father's name – Xiong, literally "bear" – as the royal clan name of Chu, which is now the 72nd most common surname in China.

Xiong Li was succeeded by his son, Xiong Kuang, and his grandson Xiong Yi would later be enfeoffed by King Cheng of Zhou and granted the hereditary noble rank of zi (子).

Xiong Li House of Mi
Regnal titles
Preceded by Yuxiong	Ruler of Chu; 11th century BC	Succeeded by Xiong Kuang
