= Meridian Ridge Campaign =

1947 military campaign

- Part of the Chinese Civil War
Date	August 13, 1947 – August 18, 1947
Location	Southern Shaanxi and eastern Gansu, China
Result	Nationalist victory

Belligerents
Flag of the National Revolutionary Army National Revolutionary Army	PLA People's Liberation Army

Commanders and leaders
Ma Jiyuan; Ma Bufang	Wang Shitai; Wang Bingxiang

Strength
6,000	9,500

Casualties and losses
400 killed 1,700 wounded	500 killed 2,500 wounded

The Meridian Ridge Campaign (Chinese: 子午嶺戰役) was a series of battles fought between the nationalists and the communists in the Shaanxi province of northwest China during the Chinese Civil War in the post World War II era, resulting in a nationalist victory.

== Prelude ==
The 300-km-long Meridian Ridge (Ziwuling), covered with dense forest, was a strategically important position in Guanzhong because it was a natural barrier in the southwest for the communist base in northwest China. To the east, it overlooked the Yulin – Xianyang Highway, and to the west, it overlooked the Xi'an – Lanzhou Highway, along which Xi'an could be reached within two days. The region was a dagger in the belly of the nationalist domain to the north of the Wei River and it had been a communist base since the late 1920s. During the Second Sino-Japanese War, the communist 385th Division led by commander Wang Hongshen was stationed in this region, and was surrounded by nationalist forces several times its strength. Clashes between the two sides were inevitable and after World War II such clashes finally developed into full-scale battle in the Chinese Civil War.

In August 1947 nationalists deployed two divisions totaling six brigades to launch an encirclement and eradication campaign against the communists in their base at the Meridian Ridge. The communist local forces including the 1st and the 3rd Garrison brigades, and the headquarters of the communist 4th Column of communist regular field army with its lightly armed 6th Cavalry Division disengaged the pursuing nationalists by retreating separately northward, and then returned to Guanzhong region once more by reaching the region surrounding the Nine Steep Hills (Jiu Xian 九岘) Town in heart of the Meridian Ridge (Zi Wu Ling, 子午岭).

== Order of battle ==
Nationalist (eight regiments totaling 6,000):

- Reorganized 82nd Division commanded by General Ma Jiyuan (马继援)
  - Reorganized 100th Brigade commanded by General Tan Chengxiang (谭呈祥)
  - Reorganized 8th Cavalry Brigade commanded by General Ma Buluan (马步銮)
  - Independent 5th Cavalry Regiment (Brigade strength) commanded by General Ma Bukang (马步康)

Communist (three regiments and a cavalry division totaling 9,500):

- 2nd Regiment of the 1st Garrison Brigade commanded by Wang Shitai (王世泰), who was also in charge of overall command
- 3rd Regiment of the 1st Garrison Brigade commanded by Wang Bingxiang (王秉祥)
- 5th Regiment of the 3rd Garrison Brigade commanded by Huang Luobin (黄罗斌)
- 6th Cavalry Division of the communist 4th Column
- Gao Xuewen Independent Battalion commanded by Gao Xuewen (高学文)
- Northern Wei (guerrilla) Column commanded by Yao Pengfei (姚鹏飞)

== Commanders ==
The nationalist frontline commander was General Ma Jiyuan (马继援), Ma Bufang's only son. Awarded with the rank of colonel at the age of 16 to become a deputy regimental commander, Ma Jiyuan (马继援) was one of Ma Bufang's favorite field commanders. By the ago of 20, Ma Jiyuan (马继援) was awarded the rank of major general and attended training courses for generals at the Nationalist Party of China Army Officer Academy. Just barely two months ago, Ma Jiyuan (马继援) had led his nationalist Reorganized 82nd Division into victory against another main communist force, the communist 2nd Column led by Wang Zhen in Heshui Campaign and the young nationalist general who was only 28 years old at the time was still immersed in the previous victory and was determined to achieve another victory of similar or great scale.

The communist commander of the regular troops Wang Shitai (王世泰) was not as familiarized with the local situation as the local communists, but he was assisted by a brilliant local communist commander, Wang Wang Bingxiang (王秉祥), who first joined the communists in 1934. In 1935, the four communist guerrilla forces operating in Xinning (新宁) region were annihilated by the nationalists, with the First Squadron of the Third Group suffering the most: in less than a year, six guerrilla commanders were killed in battles consecutively. In 1936, the 20-year-old Wang Bingxiang (王秉祥) became the commander, and within six months, the guerrilla originally was just going to finally collapse had its fortune completely reversed: not only it survived, its rank boosted to over 200 and became the only communist guerrilla force survived in the region. Due to his excellent record, Wang Bingxiang (王秉祥) was promoted to several posts at the same time: he was both the political commissar of the 1st Regiment of the communist 1st Garrison Brigade and the political commissar of the communist western Guanzhong command, the communist party secretary of the Xinning (新宁) county, and the communist propaganda minister. However, Wang Bingxiang (王秉祥) was suffering from typhus, but he nonetheless fought at the frontline in this campaign, and on August 15, 1947, he was among the first to discover the massive nationalist troop deployment at Golden Village Temple (Jin Cun Miao, 金村庙) region.

== Strategies ==
As the communist 4th Column headquarters with its 6th Cavalry Division entered the Nine Steep Hills (Jiu Xian 九岘) Town in the heart of the Meridian Ridge (Zi Wu Ling, 子午岭), they were detected by the nationalist scouts in the western part of the mountain. Nationalist response was immediate: once the intelligence from the scouts was received on August 13, 1947, the nationalists sprung into action to exterminate the enemy. The nationalist strategy planned by Ma Jiyuan (马继援) was to first encircle the enemy within 24 hours, and then annihilate the enemy within the encirclement. Ma Jiyuan (马继援) would personally lead the campaign. In order to achieve the objective, the entire nationalist Reorganized 82nd Division was mobilized in the following manner:

- The nationalist Independent 5th Cavalry Regiment would be the vanguard in the center
- The nationalist Reorganized 100th Brigade would be at the right flank
- The nationalist Reorganized 8th Cavalry Brigade would be at the left flank
- Ma Jiyuan (马继援) would personally lead 4 battalions following the main forces

Once the pincer movement was completed, encirclement of the enemy was achieved and it would only be a matter of time before the enemy would be completely annihilated. The nationalist Reorganized 82nd Division began its move on August 13, 1947.

The original communist strategy was to disengage the enemy and not to fight, because after Yulin Campaign, the communist 4th Column was tasked to penetrate behind the enemy line to cut off the Lanzhou – Xining Highway, thus threatening the nationalist flank in the rear so that the nationalist force there would be tied down and could not be deployed against communists in other areas. After the communist scouts first discovered the nationalist troops camping at the regions of Teeth Village (Ya Cun, 牙村) and Golden Village Temple (Jin Cun Miao, 金村庙), the commander of the communist 4th Column, Wang Shitai (王世泰) originally planned to follow his order by disengaging the nationalists by retreating, but the strong opposition of local communists forced him to change his mind. Following the defeat of communists in Heshui Campaign, the victorious nationalists immediately launched eradication operations against the local communists and their bases in the Meridian Ridge. In the two months-long struggles, the local communists (including local garrison force and guerrilla forces) had suffered greatly in the hand of nationalist Reorganized 82nd Division. Local communists strongly wanted the field commanders to organize a counteroffensive against the nationalist Reorganized 82nd Division to avenge the death of their comrades. Communists such as the deputy communist party secretary of the Guanzhong region, Zhao Boping (赵伯平) claimed that they could not left the civilian behind, and consequently, Wang Shitai (王世泰) sent out scout to check out the enemy strength.

However, the communist scouts had made a grave error in that they mistakenly believed advance guard of the nationalist vanguard, the Independent 5th Cavalry regiment was the entire nationalist force deployed, not realizing that the entire nationalist Reorganized 82nd Division was soon to follow, and reported back that the enemy strength was only a regiment strong. Based on this erroneous report, Wang Shitai (王世泰) the communist commander was confident that with the current communist strength, they were able to annihilate the enemy and made plans accordingly to ambush the nationalists to the west of Nine Steep Hills (Jiu Xian 九岘) Town:

- The 2nd Regiment of the communist 1st Garrison Brigade was deployed to the west of Nine Steep Hills (Jiu Xian 九岘) Town.
- The 3rd Regiment of the communist 1st Garrison Brigade was deployed to New Village (Xin Zhuang, 新庄)
- The 5th Regiment of the communist 3rd Garrison Brigade was to outflank the enemy from the north of Nine Steep Hills (Jiu Xian 九岘) Town and cutting off the escaping route of the enemy
- The 6th Cavalry Division of the communist 4th Column was deployed to Peach Tree Village (Tao Shu Zhuang, 桃树庄) act as reserve

The communists began their deployment in the early morning of August 15, 1947.

== First battle ==
After Xihuachi Campaign, the nationalists adjusted their deployment and the nationalist Reorganized 82nd Division of Ma clique was tasked to encircle the communist base in the Meridian Ridge with other nationalist units commanded by Hu Zongnan. The Reorganized 100th Brigade of the nationalist Reorganized 82nd Division was stationed at Ning (宁) County, the Reorganized 8th Cavalry Brigade of the nationalist Reorganized 82nd Division stationed at Qingyang, and the brigade-strength Independent 5th Cavalry Regiment (later to be expanded into the 248th Division) of the nationalist Reorganized 82nd Division stationed at Zhengning (正宁). General Ma Jiyuan (马继援)'s plan would require the entire division to complete, but the bad weather had prevented the nationalists from taking full advantage of their cavalry. The heavy rain severely slowed down the marching of the nationalist formation, and it took an entire day to for the nationalist force to reach its designated position.

On August 14, 1947, the heavy rain in eastern Gansu had finally stopped. The nationalist advanced guard consisted of the nationalist Independent 5th Cavalry Regiment and the 2nd Regiment of the nationalist Reorganized 100th Brigade made contact with the enemy at regions of Golden Village Temple (Jin Cun Miao, 金村庙) and Dou Family's Ridge (Dou Jia Liang 豆家梁) near Nine Steep Hills (Jiu Xian 九岘) Town. The communist local garrison Gao Xuewen (高学文) Independent Regiment fought a delay action while gradually retreating eastward, finally disengaged the enemy, but the nationalists were not able to resume their rapid push by taking advantage of the good weather as they had hoped, because they were further blocked by another communist guerrilla force, the Northern Wei (Weibei 渭北) Column at Fu Family's Village (Fu Jia Zhuang, 付家庄). Although the nationalists managed to driven the enemy from their positions and severely wounding the communist guerrilla commander Yao Pengfei (姚鹏飞), the blocking actions fought by these communist units had provided the much needed times for the communists to evacuate and redeploy.

== Change of plans ==
By the morning of August 15, 1947, the nationalist Reorganized 100th Brigade and the nationalist Reorganized 8th Cavalry Brigade in the north was finally detected by the communist agents. The communist party secretary of Heshui (合水) County, Li Ke (李科), the first high ranking communist who received the information, immediately went to the communist headquarters at Nine Steep Hills (Jiu Xian 九岘) Town to inform his comrades that the enemy they faced was not just merely the nationalist Independent 5th Cavalry Regiment, but the entire nationalist Reorganized 82nd Division. This important piece of intelligence shocked the communist command, which immediately changed the plan from the original ambush to blocking actions to cover an emergency retreat, because the communists were well aware that the enemy enjoyed absolute technical superiority and the communists themselves did not have absolute numerical superiority either. Though the communists attempted to disengage, it was simply impossible. The terrain favored the nationalist cavalry and limited the speed of communist withdraw. The same terrain also prevented the communist runners from reaching the units in the field in time due to the lack of radio communication equipments on the communist side. When the communist units in the field had received the order to retreat, they were already in contact with the enemy, so blocking actions had to be fought. The communist commander Wang Shitai (王世泰) had to redeploy his units by assigning the 2nd Regiment of the communist 1st Garrison Brigade to hold the Nine Steep Hills (Jiu Xian 九岘) Town, the 3rd Regiment of the communist 1st Garrison Brigade was deployed on the slope of mountain to the west of the town, the communist 6th Cavalry Division was deployed to the valley to the west of Peach Tree Village (Tao Shu Zhuang, 桃树庄), and the 5th Regiment of the communist 3rd Garrison Brigade originally planned to be deployed behind the enemy lines to encircle the enemy became the reserve.

The original nationalist plan also failed to materialize. The nationalist frontline commander-in-chief Ma Jiyuan (马继援) was furious that the nationalist Reorganized 8th Cavalry Brigade led by commander Ma Buluan (马步銮) tasked with outflanking the enemy from the left was nowhere near the battlefield. After radio communication, Ma Jiyuan (马继援) learned that heavy rain and mud slides had prevented the cavalries from reaching its top speed and it would be the evening for the nationalist Reorganized 8th Cavalry Brigade to reach the battlefield. The nationalists simply could not wait that long and Ma Jiyuan (马继援) decided to begin the assault on the enemy before the encirclement was completed: the nationalist Independent 5th Regiment led by commander Ma Bukang (马步康) was at the right, the 2nd Regiment of the nationalist Reorganized 100th Brigade was at the left, and the 1st Regiment of the nationalist Reorganized 100th Brigade was the general reserve. The general attack would be launched at 10:00 AM on August 15, 1947.

== 2nd battle ==
At 10:00 AM, the nationalist cavalry launched their attack on the enemy positions held by the communist 3rd Regiment of the 1st Garrison Brigade by first bombarding the enemy. The defenders managed to repeatedly beat back nationalists assaults but suffered heavy casualties in the process: the crack troop of the regiment, Mu Chengguang (穆成光) Platoon, a heroic platoon named after its platoon commander Mu Chengguang (穆成光), was completed annihilated with every member in the platoon killed. The fight last until the afternoon when the communist 3rd Regiment of the 1st Garrison Brigade finally received the order to retreat which was first issued before the battle had started, and the defenders gradually retreated eastward.

The 1st Company of the 1st Battalion of the 3rd Regiment of the communist 1st Garrison Brigade defending the most northwestern position did not receive the order to retreat in time, and was totally surrounded by the attacking nationalist cavalries. Most of the members including the deputy company commander Yang Zhankui (杨占奎) were killed, and the company commander Wang Sanxu (王三绪) jumped off the cliff after exhausted the last round of ammunition, but he was lucky that he survived, and after he was recovered from his severe injury weeks later, he returned to his original post. By 4:00 PM, the 3rd Regiment of the communist 1st Garrison Brigade successfully retreated and disengaged the enemy, while the 5th Regiment of the communist 3rd Garrison Brigade took over to continue the fight of delaying actions with the pursuing nationalists. At the same time, the 2nd Regiment of the communist 1st Garrison Brigade and the 6th Cavalry Division at the flanks also engaged the nationalists in their fights to delay the enemy, and the communist force soon disengaged the pursuing nationalists and began their planned retreat.

== Communist retreat ==
The organized retreat planned by the communists did not turn out as expected because the road was congested with large numbers of donkeys carrying supplies, thus preventing communist units from reaching their predestinated positions. In the afternoon of August 15, 1947, while on his way from the Nine Steep Hills (Jiu Xian 九岘) Town to the local communist headquarters located at the region of Black Wind Bump (He Feng Ge Da, 黑风疙瘩), political commissar Wang Bingxiang (王秉祥) discovered that the nationalist cavalry was outflanking the communists by moving toward the region of Northern Firewood Bridge (北柴桥) from the region of Yang Family's Plateau (Yang Jia Yuan, 杨家塬). In the meantime, another nationalist cavalry force outflanked the communists from the other direction by moving toward Peach Tree Village (Tao Shu Zhuang, 桃树庄), from the region of Papaya Plateau (Mu Gua Yuan, 木瓜塬), in an attempt to cut off the escaping route of the communists. By this time, the main communist force, the 4th Column, had already withdrawn from the battlefield and disengaged the enemy. The remaining local communist garrison was in danger being annihilated.

On his returning trip, the communist political commissar Wang Bingxiang (王秉祥) met the retreating remnant of the 3rd Regiment of the communist 1st Garrison by chance and realized that the situation was desperate for the communists. By this time, the communist order of general retreat finally reached every communist unit in the field and everyone was to disengage the enemy by 3:00 PM, and then retreat eastward at night in different groups. By the evening, all remaining communist units had successful disengaged the enemy and successfully escaped eastward, joining the main communist force that retreated from the battlefield earlier. The commander of the communist 4th Column, Wang Shitai (王世泰) handed the wounded and the sick to the local communist units, and told the local communists that the 4th Column would continue to retreat southeastward to Red Water (Chi Shui 赤水), and Xunyi (旬邑) regions, where they would finally meet after continuing retreating in separate ways.

== Nationalist pursuit ==
The rapid communist retreat made the nationalists very suspicious, fearing that it was just another trap to lure them into yet another ambush. By 3:00 p.m. on August 15, 1947, the firepower of resisting communists subsided but the cautious nationalists did not move forward. After another hour, the nationalist Reorganized 100th Brigade launched a cavalry charge at the enemy, and realized that the enemy had already retreated. Carefully, the nationalist moved forward and by 6:00 PM, they took every position abandoned by the enemy to the west of Nine Steep Hills (Jiu Xian 九岘) Town. By this time, the nationalist Reorganized 8th Brigade under the command of Ma Buluan (马步銮) finally arrived after being delayed by heavy rain for nearly 12 hours. Consequently, Ma Jiyuan (马继援) was very unhappy because his original plan of encircling the enemy failed due to the delay. After a conference, the nationalist decided to pursuit the enemy at night.

At night of August 15, 1947, the communist force divided into two, with one portion consisted of the 3rd Regiment of the communist 1st Garrison Brigade with high ranking local cadres (prefecture level), and this smaller force successfully evaded the pursuing nationalists by moving southward. Majority of the communist force continued its eastward retreat along the valley of Meridian Ridge. The local communists had drafted many donkeys to help to carry the supplies, and this had jammed the road, thus seriously slowed the speed, with the fleeing communists only moved 20 km for the entire night.

The slow speed of fleeing communists was equally matched by the equally slow if not slower speed of pursuing nationalist cavalries. By midnight, the nationalist scouts reported to their commander-in-chief Ma Jiyuan (马继援) that the terrain ahead was extremely difficult for cavalries and there were dense forest that was perfectly for the enemy to lay an ambush. After being continuously harassed by the enemy ambushes, the cautious nationalists decided to stop completely to camp, and then continue the pursuit in the morning. In deed, the darkness had helped the communists, and Wang Bingxiang (王秉祥) with his communist forces successfully reached the safety at Kang Family's Plateau in the night of August 15, 1947 by going northwestward.

== 3rd battle ==
In the morning of August 16, 1947, the vanguard of the nationalist force, the nationalist Independent 5th Cavalry Regiment caught up with the slowing moving communist 4th Column, whose retreat was bogged down with enormous supplies it carried. The battle broke out around 10:00 AM, between the nationalist Independent 5th Cavalry Regiment and the communist rear guard, the 5th Regiment of the communist 3rd Brigade, which immediately occupied the peaks of the mountains as the position of the blocking action, covering the main communist force to continue their retreat eastward. As the battle ensued, the nationalist commander-in-chief Ma Jiyuan (马继援) ordered scouts to be dispatched to find out the exact strength of the enemy.

By noon, nationalist heavy weaponry had arrived. Ma Jiyuan (马继援) ordered the Reorganized 100th Brigade to attack the enemy positions but the nationalist assaults were repeatedly beaten back. After an hour futile efforts, Ma Jiyuan (马继援) then changed his tactic by ordering the 1st Regiment of the nationalist Reorganized 8th Cavalry Brigade and the Independent 5th Cavalry Brigade to outflank the enemy, while the 2nd Regiment of the nationalist Reorganized 8th Cavalry Brigade would bypass the enemy position to continue the pursuit of the main enemy force in retreat. At 1:00 PM, the nationalists launched another round of offensive with their new tactic.

Huang Luobing (黄罗斌), the commander of the communist 3rd Garrison Brigade leading the communist 5th Regiment, realized that the blocking action was no longer meaningful since nationalist cavalries had begun to bypass the communist positions to pursuit the main communist force in retreat. He also realized that the nationalists were encircling his troops, which were in danger of being wiped out. Commander Huang Luobing (黄罗斌) immediately ordered his troops to retreat northward to Locust Tree Village (Huai Shu Zhuang, 槐树庄), and the former-guerrilla soldiers acted so swiftly that by 4:00 PM, they had completely shaken off the nationalists in pursuit. However, they had withdrawn too fast, that not only the enemy lost contact with them, but their comrades in other communist units lost contact with them as well. Compounding the problem, the retreating 5th Regiment of the communist 3rd Brigade did not even bother to make contact with other communist units after reaching safety, which resulted in disastrous consequence: the communist main force led by Wang Shitai (王世泰) in retreat was later caught up by the pursuing nationalist cavalries.

== Further retreat ==
Leading two battalions, large number of civilian cadres, and burdened with tremendous supplies, Wang Shitai (王世泰) continued the retreat until the evening, when the fleeing communists were finally able to have their first break, and held a conference regarding their next move. In order to avoid being annihilated by the enemy together, the communists decided to disengage the pursuing enemy in small groups. Majority of the communist force would go southeastward toward Construction Village (Jian Zhuang, 建庄), and the remaining communist force would be personally led by Wang Shitai (王世泰) to go northward to Zheng Ning (正宁) county, where the local nationalist garrison, the Independent 5th Cavalry Regiment had already left long ago to become the vanguard of nationalists chasing the fleeing communists. Taking advantage of dark night, the communist force broke up and began their march at night of in rain. The bulk of the communist force including the communist 6th Cavalry Division, part of the communist 1st Garrison Brigade and all of civilian cadres under the command of Gao Jinchun (高锦纯) made a successful retreat after abandoning most equipment and supplies, and finally reached the safety of Yijun (宜君) county of Shaanxi after crossing the Meridian Ridge.

The smaller communist force led by Wang Shitai (王世泰) was far less fortunate. After the breakup of his force, Wang Shitai (王世泰) led his formation southwestward, in an attempt to disengage the pursuing nationalists by going behind the enemy line. However, the rapid response of the nationalist cavalry ruined his plan by following closely, and by the afternoon of August 17, 1947, Wang Shitai (王世泰) still could not shake off the nationalists when they reached the Eagle's Feather's Pass (Diao Ling Guan, 雕翎关) at the border of Shaanxi and Gansu. Seeing his troops had not had any rest in two days and two nights straight, Wang Shitai (王世泰) devised a new plan. The commander of the communist 3rd Garrison Regiment, Ge Haizhou (葛海洲), would lead the 1st Battalion of the communist 3rd Garrison Regiment to engage the pursuing nationalists and lead them northward, away from the 2nd and the 3rd Battalion of the communist 3rd Garrison Regiment. Luck was on the communist side as the nationalists were lured away and the communists at the Eagle's Feather's Pass (Diao Ling Guan, 雕翎关) were able to get the rest they desperately needed. Luck proved to be once again on the communist side when the heavy rain and dark nights had enabled the 1st Battalion of the communist 3rd Garrison Regiment to successfully evade the pursuing nationalist cavalries.

== Final decisions ==
On August 17, 1947, Wang Shitai (王世泰) held another conference after dark at the Eagle's Feather's Pass (Diao Ling Guan, 雕翎关), and decided to send two officers, Niu Shushen (牛书申) and Liu Yinggon (刘懋功) to make contact with the communist 2nd Garrison Regiment that stayed behind to cover the retreat. Once the contact was reestablished, they would rejoin the communist 3rd Garrison Regiment to return to Guanzhong for the desperately needed rest. Wang Shitai (王世泰) and his staff officer Gao Weisong (高维嵩) would lead the headquarters staff of the communist 3rd Garrison Regiment to return to eastern Gansu to look for the 5th Regiment of the communist 3rd Garrison Regiment. Wang Shitai (王世泰) believed that the pursuing nationalists had already penetrated deep into the Meridian Ridge following him, and if he and his force could cut behind the enemy line, the unexpected move would ensure their safety. Unfortunately, he was totally wrong this time.

By the evening of August 17, 1947, Ma Jiyuan (马继援) was a little depressed because after last engagement with the enemy on the day before, the enemy main force was nowhere to be found. Furthermore, the search and destroy operation became increasingly difficult because the thick forest and mountainous terrain had greatly reduced the effectiveness of cavalry. Ma Jiyuan (马继援) voiced his concern to his father Ma Bufang at Xining via radio, and the latter immediately order the general retreat by claiming that the nationalist force was in danger of being ambushed in the enemy's heartland where even Hu Zongnan dared not to venture this far. Ma Jiyuan (马继援) realized the potential danger his force would face, especially when the main force of the enemy was not heard from since Yulin Campaign, and had it being hiding nearby for an ambush, the nationalist force deep in the heartland of enemy would be in danger of being wiped out. As a result, Ma Jiyuan (马继援) ordered a general retreat to be carried out the next day at dawn. This meant that the communist and the nationalist paths would meet, a situation the communists desperately attempt to avoid.

== Conclusion ==
The nationalist Reorganized 82nd Division retreated toward Xifeng, Heshui (合水), and Qingyang via the same route it entered the heart of the communist base. The 2nd Regiment of the Reorganized 8th Cavalry Brigade of the nationalist Reorganized 82nd Division was the nationalist unit that struck the deepest blow into the enemy's heartland, and it was at most eastward position when received the general retreat order. By the afternoon of August 18, 1947, the nationalist regiment made its way back to the Peach Tree Village (Tao Shu Zhuang, 桃树庄) of near Nine Steep Hills (Jiu Xian, 九岘) Town, and met the small retreating headquarters force of the communist 4th Column led by its commander Wang Shitai (王世泰). A short battle ensued and both side chose not to continue to engage the enemy.

After retreating to the safety at the Papaya Plateau (Mu Gua Yuan, 木瓜塬), Wang Bingxiang (王秉祥) heard gunshots in the direction of Peach Tree Village (Tao Shu Zhuang, 桃树庄), and he immediately led his guerrilla to the direction of gunshots to reinforce their comrades. However, before they could join the battle, the gunshots stopped when they had just reached Gao Family's Col (Gao Jia Ao, 高家坳). Wang Bingxiang (王秉祥) and his guerrilla observed that there were several dozen communist cavalries retreating along the mountain ridge. Several days later, Wang Bingxian (王秉祥) and his guerrilla fighters learnt that those retreating communists cavalries were actually the members of the headquarters staff of the communist 4th Column, including their superior Wang Shitai (王世泰). Ma Fushou (马福寿), the commander of the second Regiment of the Reorganized 8th Cavalry Brigade of the nationalist Reorganized 82nd Division had ready received order to withdraw, and was on his way retreating toward the region of Golden Village Temple (Jin Cun Miao 金村庙), thus did not pursuit the fleeing enemy. Had the nationalists known that the group included the highest communist commander of Guanzhong, they would certainly give a chase and Wang Shitai (王世泰) and his staff would not be able to escape for sure.

== Aftermath ==
At night of August 18, 1947, heavy rain poured down. Wang Bingxiang (王秉祥) led his troops in retreat without any provisions. Out of desperation, many of his soldiers took cotton out of their uniform and soaked the cotton in lubricants of the rifle, and used the makeshift torch for warmth. Due to the insufficient camp ground, many of the soldiers slept in the rain. Other communist units fared no better: an acting company commander named Liang Manping (梁满平) of the 3rd Regiment of the communist 1st Garrison Brigade led his remaining troops spent days in a yaodong, and being the first time on his own to independently leading a formation, he was afraid of something bad happened and did not sleep for three days and three nights. When Wang Bingxiang (王秉祥) and his unit found Liang Manping (梁满平) and his troops in the morning of August 19, 1947, Liang Manping (梁满平) was so happy that he shouted:”I was worried to death, and it was so good to find you! I would no longer harbor any individualism and I would never want to be an officer again!” Before anyone could answer, Liang Manping (梁满平) dropped down and fell into deep sleep that he had to be carried away on a stretcher because nobody could wake him up.

Other communist commanders were less fortunate. Wan Sanxu (王三绪), the commander of the 1st Company of the 1st Battalion of the communist 3rd Garrison Regiment managed to survive and recover after jumping off the cliff, and then returned to command his unit, but the casualties his company suffered was so high that over 70% of the soldiers in his company consisted of former-nationalist prisoner-of-war. The morale of the new soldiers was low, their loyalty was uncertain, and their capability was inadequate, all of which was proved soon, at the cost of Wan Sanxu (王三绪)'s life. Four months later during Yichuan Campaign, in a battle at the Southern Pagoda Ridge (Nan Ta Liang, 南塔梁) at White Water (Bai Shui, 白水) region of Shaanxi, Wan Sanxu (王三绪) was shot and killed while leading a retreat by his own soldiers, who were former-nationalist prisoners-of-war. Wan Sanxu (王三绪) was 44 years old.

On August 22, 1947, Wang Shitai (王世泰), the commander of the communist 4th Column found the 5th Regiment of the 3rd Garrison Brigade led by Huang Luobing (黄罗斌) at Locust Tree Village (Huai Shu Zhuang, 槐树庄), the communists regrouped at Xihuaichi (西华池) region of the Heshui (合水) county and rested for ten days. The communist 1st Garrison Brigade rested at Yijun (宜君) county of Shaanxi. Local communist units from Guanzhong were incorporated into the communist 2nd and the 3rd Garrison Regiments to make up the combat loss. Two months later, the communist 1st and 3rd Brigades were reassigned to the 4th Column to strength the communist column.

The nationalist victory was incomplete because Ma Jiyuan (马继援) was too prudent. Fearing enemy ambush in the heart of communist territory (a very legitimate concern), and not knowing the truth strength of the enemy, the nationalists withdrew too quickly and did not bother to destroy the supplies and weaponry the fleeing enemy abandoned, majority of which was recovered by the communists within several days immediately after the nationalist withdraw. The 6th Cavalry Division of the communist 4th Column abandoned three mountain guns in its retreat and the nationalists captured them and as symbolic gesture, they were sent to Xi'an as exhibits of their Meridian Ridge Victory exhibition.

== Outcome ==
The communist defeat had exposed it main problem: the guerrilla was still heavily influenced by its guerrilla tactics and did not adjust well to modern conventional warfare. The 5th Regiment of the communist 3rd Garrison Brigade performed poorly due to its guerrilla practice, and when it withdrew from the battle without permission, other communist units were endangered. Furthermore, after withdrawing to Locust Tree Village (Huai Shu Zhuang, 槐树庄), none of the commanders and soldiers of the 5th Regiment of the communist 3rd Garrison Brigade made any attempt to contact their superior or other communist units during their entire six-day-long stay at the village. A communist since 1929, Huang Luobing (黄罗斌), the commander of the communist 3rd Garrison Brigade was an expert in guerrilla warfare, and he rose in ranks from an ordinary guerrilla soldier thru his excellence. However, the only experience in conventional warfare Huang had was as the commander-in-chief of the eastern sub-district of Northern Shaanxi Military District and as the chief-of-staff of the Security Headquarters of the communist base in northwestern China, but he had never directed any conventional battles. However, communists had obviously not learnt anything from their defeat and thus paid a heavy price in later conflicts:

In 1948, during the Western Shaanxi-Eastern Gansu Campaign, the communist 3rd Garrison Brigade was tasked to protect the right flank of the attacking communist force but it was unable to stop the nationalist counterattack led by the nationalist general Pei Changhui (裴昌会) and the former-guerrilla turned regular unit withdrew into Linyou (麟游) mountains, exposing the Peng Dehuai's headquarters and the communist main force at Baoji. Had not been the New 4th Brigade of the communist 6th Column fought hard to stop the nationalists, Peng Dehuai would have been killed and the headquarters of the communist First Field Army would have been totally destroyed.

Peng Dehuai and his headquarters of the communist First Field Army would meet a similar danger several days later when the communist 3rd Garrison Brigade once again made the same debacle: when the attacking communists withdrew to Northern Shaanxi via Eastern Gansu, Peng Dehuai ordered the 5th Regiment of the communist 3rd Garrison Brigade to guard the region from Duzi (屯字) town to Xiaojing (萧金) to secure the safe passage for the headquarters and the communist 1st, 4th and 6th columns. When the communist 3rd Garrison Brigade approached the Duzi (屯字) town, it discovered that town was already occupied by its nemesis: the nationalist Reorganized 82nd Division. Without asking the permission and reporting the discovery, the 5th Regiment of the communist 3rd Garrison Brigade withdrew southward to Taiping (太平) Town. As a result, the divisional headquarters of the nationalist Reorganized 82nd Division led by Ma Jiyuan (马继援) met head on with the headquarters of the communist First Field Army led by Peng Dehuai, who was unaware of the situation. Both sides were extremely cautious in the battle because neither knew the strength of the other, and had the nationalist unit not commanded by Ma Jiyuan (马继援), but any other lower ranking officers who would attack aggressively, Peng Dehuai would have been killed once again and the headquarters of the communist First Field Army would have been totally destroyed for sure.

After the Western Shaanxi-Eastern Gansu Campaign, Peng Dehuai angrily criticized Huang Luobing (黄罗斌), claiming that the mistake he had made would be sufficient to have him executed. As a result, Huang Luobing (黄罗斌) was kicked out of military and transferred to a job as civilian administer. Had the communists learned the problem of the former-guerillas earlier during the Meridian Ridge Campaign and remedied the problem back then, they would not have to face the danger later on in Western Shaanxi-Eastern Gansu Campaign. The nationalist Reorganized 82nd Division of Ma clique once again dealt a heavy blow to its long term adversary, the units of the communist First Field Army, just as it had done earlier in Heshui Campaign. Had Ma Bufang not interfered with the command at the last stage and the nationalists continued their offensive, the nationalist victory would have been much bigger and the communists would have suffered much greater loss.

== See also ==
- Outline of the Chinese Civil War
- National Revolutionary Army
- History of the People's Liberation Army
