= Ji (surname 季) =

Ji (季)
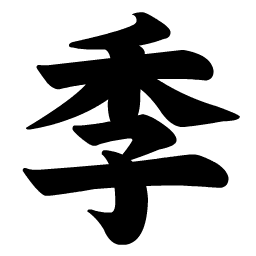
- Pronunciation: Jì (Mandarin); Gwai (Cantonese)
- Language: Chinese

Origin
- Language: Old Chinese

Other names
- Variant forms: Chi, Kwai

Jì is the Mandarin pinyin romanization of the Chinese surname written 季 in Chinese character. It is romanized as Chi in Wade–Giles, and Gwai in Cantonese. Ji is the 142nd most common surname in China, with a population of 960,000. It is listed the 134th in the Song dynasty classic text Hundred Family Surnames.

== Etymology ==
In ancient usage, the characters of meng (孟), zhong (仲), shu (叔) and ji (季) were used to denote the first, second, third and fourth eldest sons in a family. The Chinese character Ji 季 is composed of two parts: 禾 (grain) and 子 (son), and originally means "young grain". Later it acquired the meaning of "the youngest", and was frequently used in the name or title of the youngest son (or daughter) of a family. It is from this usage that the character became a surname. According to analysis based on the early 11th-century dictionary Guangyun, in Middle Chinese the character was pronounced [kwi].

== Demographics ==
As of 2008, Ji 季 is the 142nd most common surname in China, shared by 960,000 people, or 0.077% of the Chinese population. It is concentrated in East China, including Jiangsu, Zhejiang, and Shanghai. Jiangsu province alone accounts for 44% of the people surnamed Ji 季, followed by Zhejiang with 10%.

== Origins ==
The main origin of the Ji 季 surname is the state of Lu during the Spring and Autumn period of ancient China. Prince You was commonly called Ji You (季友) as he was the youngest son of Duke Huan of Lu. After the death of his older brother Duke Zhuang of Lu, Ji You helped Duke Zhuang's son to ascend the throne as Duke Xi of Lu, and he became Duke Xi's chief minister. He was the founding patriarch of the Jisun clan, the most powerful of the Three Huan clans that dominated the politics of Lu for centuries to come. His descendants adopted Jisun, which was later shortened to Ji, as their surname. This source of Ji 季 is a branch of Ji 姬, the ancestral surname of the dukes of Lu.

A second origin of the Ji surname was Jilian (季連), the first recorded ruler of the state of Chu. This origin of Ji is a branch of Mi 芈, the royal surname of Chu.

Several other states of the Zhou dynasty, such as Qi and Wei, also had noble lineages that adopted Ji 季 as their surname.

== Later adoption ==
During the Ming and Qing dynasties, several Mongol and Manchu clans adopted the Ji surname, and many Ji-surnamed people in Northeast China are from this origin.

== Notable people ==
- Ji You or Ji Chengzi (季成子; died 644 BC), Chief Minister of the state of Lu
- Jisun Xingfu or Ji Wenzi (季文子; died 568 BC), grandson of Ji You, Chief Minister of Lu
- Ji Bu (季布; 3rd century BC), a top general of Xiang Yu and later the Han dynasty
- Ji Zhenyi (季振宜; 1630–?), Qing dynasty official, writer, and collector
- Ji Zhichang (季芝昌; 1791–1860), Qing dynasty minister, general, and Governor of Shanxi province
- Ji Yunqing (季云卿; 1868–1939), Shanghai gangster assassinated for collaborating with the Japanese during WWII
- Ji Xianlin (季羨林; 1911–2009), prominent linguist, Indologist, palaeographer, and historian
- Ji Yunshi (季允石; born 1945), former governor of Jiangsu and Hebei provinces
- Ji Jianye (季建业; born 1957), former mayor of Nanjing
- Yun-Fei Ji or Ji Yunfei (季云飞; born 1963), painter
- Ji Mingyi (季铭义; born 1980), football player
- Timothy Kwai or Ji Tinggang (季霆剛; born 1983), Hong Kong politician
- Ji Xiaobing (季肖冰; born 1987), actor
- Ji Liping (季丽萍; born 1988), Olympic swimmer
- Ji Xiaoxuan (季骁宣; born 1993), football player
- Ji Jiafu (季加孚; born 1959), surgical oncologist
