= Lanzhou Campaign =

1949 battles of the Chinese civil war

- Part of the Chinese Civil War
Date	August 9, 1949 – August 27, 1949
Location	Lanzhou, Gansu, China
Result	Communist victory

Belligerents
Republic of China Army	People's Liberation Army

Commanders and leaders
Ma Jiyuan; Ma Bufang	Peng Dehuai

Strength
100,000	200,000

Casualties and losses
42,000 killed	11,000 killed

The Lanzhou Campaign was a series of battles fought between the nationalists and the communists for the control of the largest city in northwestern China during the Chinese Civil War in the post-World War II era, and resulted in a communist victory.

== Prelude ==
After the defeat of Fufeng-Meixian Campaign (扶郿战役) in July 1949, the nationalists under the command of Hu Zongnan were forced to withdraw to the south of Qinling. As Hu Zongnan's force withdrew to western China, the Ma clique's force became the major nationalist force responsible for the defense of the northwestern China. Lanzhou, the largest city in northwestern China was critical to the security of the entire northwestern China and on the northwestern China joint defense conference held in Guangzhou, the nationalist defenders planned to defeat the enemy at the gate of the city of Lanzhou with the help from their comrades-in-arms from southern Shaanxi, southern Gansu and Ningxia.

== Order of battle ==
Defenders: nationalist order of battle:

- Shaanxi-Gansu Corps
  - The 82nd Army
  - The 129th Army
  - The 8th Cavalry Division
  - The 14th Cavalry Division
  - 1 Security Brigade
- The 81st Army
- The 91st Army
- The 120th Army
- The Cavalry Army

Attackers: communist order of battle:

- I Corps
- II Corps
- XIX Corps

== Strategies ==
The nationalist strategy was to station the 82nd Army and the 129th Army of the Shaanxi-Gansu Corps, 2 cavalry divisions, and a security brigade totaling 50,000 in Lanzhou to defend the city itself. The nationalist 81st Army under the command of Ma Hongkui and the nationalist 91st Army and 120th Army totaling 30,000 troops would guard the left flank of Lanzhou by defending Jingtai (景泰), Jingyuang (靖远) and Dalachi (打拉池) regions. The nationalist Cavalry Army totaling 20,000 would be stationed at Lintao and Taishi (太石) regions to guard the right flank of Lanzhou. The main defense of the city would be the Southern Mountain (南山) line outside the city and the overall defense of the city was commanded by Ma Bufang's only son, Ma Jiyuan (马继援), the commander-in-chief of the nationalist Shaanxi-Gansu Corps

The Communist troops were given instructions on behavior in the heavily Muslim populated province of Gansu, to prevent accidental insults or other incidents.

The communist strategy became clear on August 4, 1949, when the communist commander-in-chief of the 1st Field Army Peng Dehuai issued the order to take Lanzhou and Xining by concentrating majority of its force. The plan was to have the communist 7th Army and the XVIII Corps (without its 62nd Army) to stay in Baoji and Tianshui to face nationalist force under Hu Zongnan's command to secure the left flank and the rear of the communist main force, and the 64th Army of the XIX Corps would push toward Guyuan and Haiyuan regions to face nationalist force Ma Hongkui's command to secure the right flank for the communist main force. The communist I Corps and the 62nd Army of the XVIII Corps would push toward Longxi, Lintao, Linxia and Xunhua regions and then cross the Yellow River to attack Xining, thus cutting off the nationalists' escape route from the rear. The communist main force consisted of the II Corps and the XIX Corps without its 64th Army totaling 5 armies near 150,000 troops would push toward Lanzhou from Xi'an via Xi'an-Lanzhou highway in two fronts, the northern front and the southern front.

== First stage ==
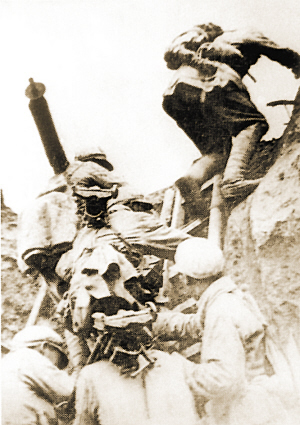
PLA soldiers in the attack on the city wall

On August 9, 1949, the communist 1st Field Army begun its attack toward Lanzhou and Xining from eastern Gansu. On August 14, 1949, the communist XIX Corps took Dingxi, while on August 16, 1949, the communist II Corps took Yuzhong and the communist I Corps took Lintao, forcing Ma Bufang's nationalist Cavalry Army to flee westward. On August 20, 1949, the communist I Corps took Kangle, threatening Linxia, while the communist II Corps and XIX Corps reached the outskirt of Lanzhou. On August 21, 1949, a total of nine regiments from the communist II Corps and XIX Corps attacked the nationalist stronghold at Southern Mountain outside Lanzhou, but were beaten back with heavy losses after two days of fierce fighting.

The communist commander Peng Dehuai decided to call off the attack and regroup so lessons gained in the fighting could be learned and utilized for the following assaults. On August 22, 1949, the communist I Corps took Linxia, completely annihilating Ma Bufang's nationalist Cavalry Army in the process. As the nationalist defenders of Lanzhou were threatened from rear and right flank, Ma Bufang was forced to withdraw the nationalist 8th Cavalry Division and the nationalist 14th Cavalry Division stationed in the northern bank of the Yellow River back to Xining to strength the defense of the provincial capital of Qinghai. The nationalist defense of Lanzhou was further weakened as a result.

On August 24, Ma Bufang reported that the Communists were defeated and 10,000 of them were dead.

== Second stage ==
After thorough preparation, the communist II and XIX Corps attacked the city again on August 25, 1949, at dawn, and by dusk, the nationalist stronghold at Southern Mountain outside the city fell into the enemy hands. After suffering heavy casualties, the nationalist morale collapsed and the defenders outside the city fled inside and Ma Jiyuan (马继援), the nationalist commander-in-chief of the Shaanxi-Gansu Corps fled to Xining in the evening, abandoning most of his troops. In the morning of August 26, 1949, a detachment of the communist 3rd Army took Western Pass (西关) of the city and then took the Iron Bridge on the Yellow River, thus successfully cutting off the only escape route of the defenders, while other enemy detachments also managed to successfully breaching the defense of the city and begun fierce street fights with the remaining nationalist garrison. By 11:00 AM, the communist 4th Army took White Pagoda Mountain (Bai Ta Shan, 白塔山) on the northern bank of the Yellow River and an hour later, the last nationalist resistance within the city wall was eliminated and the city was firmly in the enemy hands. After the completion of the mop up operations in the suburb on the next day, the enemy formally declared the city was secured on August 27, 1949.

The 5,000 Chinese Muslim defenders in Lanzhou inflicted 10,000 casualties upon the Communist 2nd army during the six-day battle.

In order to relieve the besieged city, the nationalists organized several futile reinforcement attempts: nationalist commander Hu Zongnan ordered four armies to launch an offensive on August 27, 1949, from southern Gansu toward regions including Xihe and Li Counties in Gansu, and Baoji, Duo Town (Duo Zhen, 虢镇) in Shaanxi, in the hope of taking Baoji and Tianshui, thus forcing the enemy to stop the attack on Lanzhou and reinforce these regions. However, as the news of the fall of Lanzhou was learned, the nationalist offensive fell apart as the nationalist morale immediately collapsed, and the futile offensive was beaten back by the communist XVIII Corps on the same day it was launched. Learning the news of the fall of Lanzhou, other nationalist reinforcement also immediately withdrew: Ma Hongkui's nationalist 81st Army withdrew back to Ningxia and Ma Bufang's nationalist 91st Army and the nationalist 120th Army retreated to Hexi Corridor.

== Outcome ==
The fall of Lanzhou cost the nationalists more than 42,000 troops, nearly half of the total nationalist force in the northwestern China. The fall of the largest city in northwestern China to the PLA completely demoralized the nationalists and triggered a disastrous domino effect: after taking Lanzhou, the 62nd Army of the XVIII Corps and the communist I Corps without its 7th Army continued its push toward Xining, and from August 28, 1949, thru September 5, 1949, the communist I Corps had crossed the Yellow River at Yongjing (永靖) in Gansu and Xunhua (循化) in Qinghai, and took Minhe, and Hualong, threatening Xining. Ma Bufang and his only son Ma Jiyuan (马继援) fled to Chongqing by air, and Xining fell to the PLA on September 5, 1949. The remaining 2,000 survivors of Ma Bufang's troops surrendered to the PLA after they fled to Huangzhong and Haiyan regions, and the entire Qinghai province fell to the PLA by the mid of September, 1949. Beiping Radio announced the capture of Lanzhou on August 27, 1949.

After the Lanzhou campaign, the airstrips of the Gansu corridor came under Communist control.

For decades, the communists have willfully decreased their number of losses by agreeing with their nationalist adversary's claim of inflicting more than 8,700 casualties on the communists in Lanzhou Campaign. It was not until the late 1990s did the communists finally begun to admit their real loss which is higher than they had originally claimed by publicizing the Peng Dehuai's telegram to Wang Zhen on August 28, 1949, in which the real communist losses were given when Peng Dehuai asked Wang Zhen to inform He Long that the communist casualties was in fact just below 11,000. However, the communist victory did open the gateway to Ningxia and Xinjiang, and paved the way for the following victories in the northwestern China.

== See also ==
- Outline of the Chinese Civil War
- National Revolutionary Army
- History of the People's Liberation Army
