= Ji (surname 纪) =

Chinese family name

Ji (纪/紀)
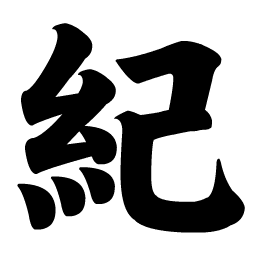
- Pronunciation: Jǐ (Mandarin); Kei (Cantonese)
- Language: Chinese

Origin
- Language: Old Chinese
- Meaning: "record; remember"

Other names
- Variant forms: Chi, Kei, Kee

Jǐ (or Jì) is the Mandarin pinyin romanization of the Chinese surname written 纪 in simplified Chinese and 紀 in traditional Chinese. It is romanized as Chi in Wade–Giles, and Kei in Cantonese. Ji is the 136th most common surname in China, with a population of 1.1 million. It is listed 122nd in the Song dynasty classic text Hundred Family Surnames. It is 42nd in the Hundred Family Surnames, contained in the verse 熊紀舒屈 (Xiong, Ji, Shu, Qu).

== Demographics ==
As of 2008, Ji 纪 is the 136th most common surname in China, shared by 1.1 million people, or 0.088% of the Chinese population. It is concentrated in Beijing, Anhui, Jiangsu, and Shandong, which together account for 48% of the total.

== Origin ==
Ji 纪 originated from the ancient state of Ji in present-day Shouguang, Shandong province. In 690 BC, Ji was conquered and annexed by Duke Xiang of the neighbouring state of Qi, and the people of Ji adopted the name of their former state as their surname. The Ji 纪 surname is a branch of Jiang 姜, the surname of ruling clan of the Ji state.

== Notable people ==
- Ji Xin (紀信; died 204 BC), general serving under Liu Bang during the Chu–Han contention
- Ji Ling (紀靈; 2nd century AD), general serving under Yuan Shu during the Eastern Han dynasty
- Ji Zhan (紀瞻; 253–324), Jin Dynasty general
- Ji Chuna (紀處訥; died 710), Tang dynasty chancellor
- Ji Junxiang (纪君祥; 13th century), Yuan dynasty playwright, author of The Orphan of Zhao
- Empress Ji (纪皇后; died 1475), Ming dynasty empress, mother of the Hongzhi Emperor
- Ji Yun (紀昀; 1724–1805), Qing dynasty scholar and government minister, chief editor of the Siku Quanshu
- Ji Dengkui (纪登奎; 1923–1988), Vice Premier of China, key figure of the Cultural Revolution
- Chi Cheng (紀政; born 1944), Olympian track and field athlete of Taiwan
- Ji Baocheng (纪宝成; born 1944), former President of Renmin University of China
- David Ji (born 1952), Chinese-American electronics entrepreneur who co-founded Apex Digital, and was held against his will in China for months without charges during a business dispute
- Chi Ta-wei (紀大偉; born 1972), Taiwanese writer
- Samingad or Ji Xiaojun (紀曉君; born 1977), aboriginal Taiwanese singer
- Chi Shu-ju (紀淑如; born 1982), Taiwanese taekwondo practitioner and Olympic medalist
- Ji Minjia (纪敏佳; born 1982), singer
- Reuben Kee En Rui (纪恩锐; 1984–2007), Singaporean dragon-boat paddler, composer and part-time model
- Ji Yanyan (纪妍妍; born 1985), member of Chinese women's basketball team at the 2012 Summer Olympics
- Perenna Kei or Ji Kaiting (纪凯婷; born 1989 or 1990), youngest billionaire in the world according to Forbes
