= Nanjing Ninghai Middle School =

Middle school in China

- 南京市宁海中学
- Motto: 大诚 大勤 大勇
- Motto in English: Honesty Diligence Courage
- Type: Public
- Established: 1911
- President: Guo Qijun
- Faculty: Senior, 152
- Students: 1,891
- Location: Nanjing, Jiangsu, China
- Campus: 77 ha (0.05 km^{2})

Nanjing Ninghai Middle School, founded in 1890 as Wen Zheng Academy, is a middle school in Jiangsu Province, China. The school was divided into two parts: senior school and junior school in 1997. There are 40 classes in senior school.

Ninghai Senior School has been selected as a Provincial Key one since 1997. It is also an Experimental Students Base for Academy of Arts & Design, Tsinghua University. The school has provided celebrated people such as Wang Daohan, Xiong Xianghui, and 12 other academicians of the Chinese Academy of Sciences.

== Location ==
Ninghai Junior School is located in Gulou District, Nanjing. Transport to the school is by bus 11, 66, 65, 91, 134, D1, 42, and 75.

Ninghai Senior School is situated in Ninghai Street, which contributes its name. Neighbours are the Government of Jiangsu Province and Nanjing Normal University.
