= Yuxiong =

Yuxiong (Chinese: 鬻熊; pinyin: Yùxióng, reigned 11th century BC), also known as Yuzi or Master Yu (Chinese: 鬻子; pinyin: Yùzǐ), was an early ruler of the ancient Chinese state that was later known as Chu. He was an ally and teacher of King Wen of Zhou (reigned 1099–1050 BC), the first king of the Zhou dynasty. In the Tsinghua Bamboo Slips his name is written as Xuexiong (Chinese: 穴熊; pinyin: Xuéxióng).

Yuxiong's clan name was Mi (芈). His son and successor Xiong Li adopted the second character of his name – Xiong – as the royal lineage name of Chu, which is now the 72nd most common surname in China.

== Ancestry ==
According to legends recorded in the Records of the Grand Historian by Sima Qian, Yuxiong descended from the mythical Yellow Emperor and his grandson and successor Zhuanxu. Zhuanxu's great-grandson Wuhui was put in charge of fire by Emperor Ku and given the title Zhurong. Wuhui's son Luzhong (陸終) had six sons, all born by Caesarian section. The youngest son Jilian adopted the ancestral surname Mi and had a son named Fuju (附沮). Xuexiong was Fuju's son. However, Sima Qian mistakenly believed Xuexiong and Yuxiong were two different people and that Yuxiong was Xuexiong's descendant.

== Enfeoffment ==
Yuxiong died during the reign of King Wen of Zhou, and was succeeded by his son Xiong Li. After Zhou overthrew the Shang dynasty, King Wen's grandson King Cheng of Zhou (reigned 1042–1021 BC) awarded Yuxiong's great-grandson Xiong Yi the hereditary title of zĭ (子, roughly "viscount") and the fiefdom of Chu, which in the ensuing centuries developed into one of the most powerful kingdoms of the Spring and Autumn period.

Yuxiong House of Mi
Regnal titles
Preceded by Yingbo	Ruler of Chu; 11th century BC	Succeeded by Xiong Li
