= Ma Jiyuan =

Chinese warlord (1921–2012)

Ma Jiyuan 馬繼援 مَا‌ ڭِ‌یُوًا
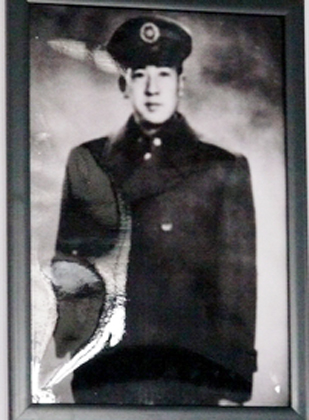
- Ma Jiyuan
- Born: 18 January 1921; Linxia County, Gansu, Republic of China
- Died: 27 February 2012 (aged 91) Jeddah, Saudi Arabia
- Allegiance: Republic of China
- Service years: 1939–1981
- Rank: Major General
- Commands: General Officer Commanding 82nd Army
- Conflicts: Second Sino-Japanese War; Chinese Civil War; Heshui Campaign; Meridian Ridge Campaign; Lanzhou Campaign

Ma Jiyuan
- Traditional Chinese: 馬繼援
- Simplified Chinese: 马继援
Transcriptions
Standard Mandarin
- Hanyu Pinyin: Mǎ Jìyuán
- Wade–Giles: Ma Chi-yuan
other Mandarin
- Xiao'erjing: مَا‌ ڭِ‌یُوًا

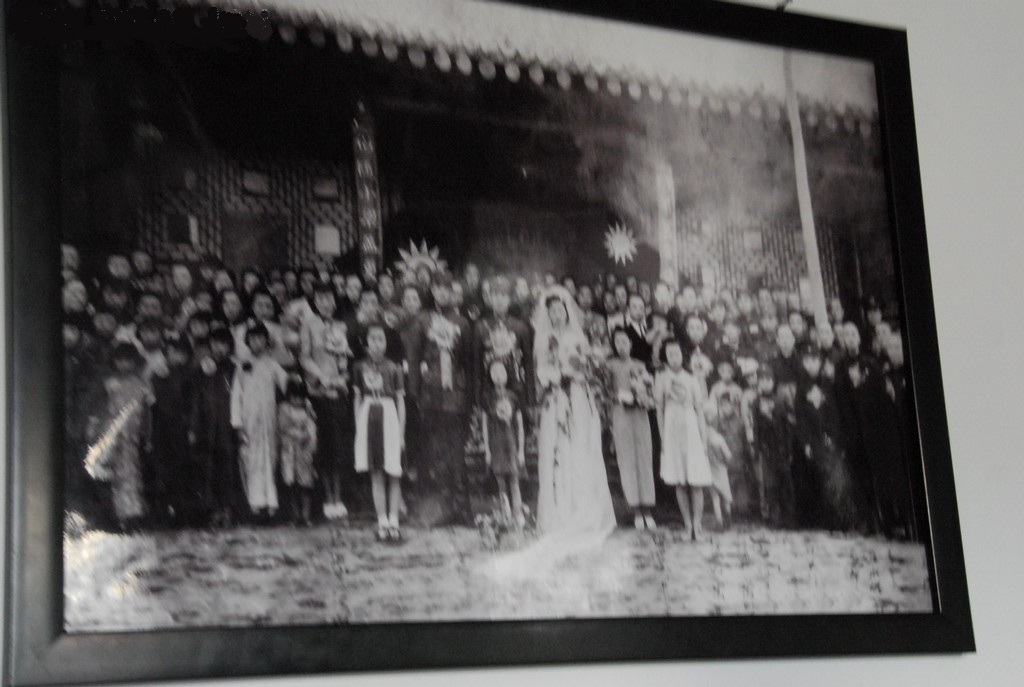
Ma Jiyuan's wedding with a Kuomintang flag in the background.

Ma Jiyuan (Xiao'erjing: مَا‌ ڭِ‌یُوًا, 18 January 1921 – 27 February 2012) was a Chinese Muslim Ma clique warlord in China during the Republic of China era, ruling the northwestern province of Qinghai. He was the son and only child of general Ma Bufang and commanded nationalist forces against the communists at the Heshui Campaign, Meridian Ridge Campaign, and the Lanzhou Campaign during the Chinese Civil War. Ma was 28 years old when he defeated 30,000 PLA soldiers in the Heshui campaign in 1948. He led the 82nd Cavalry Division, of which 30 percent of whom were Muslims, to charge the Communists with swords. Ma complained that the Kuomintang government was not resupplying him enough and that there was no more "revolutionary spirit". On the opposing side General Zhao Shoushan led the Communists, Zhao formerly attended the same school as Ma.

He became a colonel at the age of 16 and was promoted to major general at the age of 20. He had attended the Whampoa Military Academy. Ma was given a silver cup by the Divine Word Missionaries after he came back from the northwestern front.

In May 1949, General Hu Zongnan and Ma set up a planned trap. Hu faked a retreat, then Communist General Peng Dehuai advanced with 120,000 men from Xi'an to Sichuan, but at 75 miles Hu started a pitched battle and then Ma personally led 20,000 of his cavalry forces to defeat the Communist forces and send them fleeing, and he continued to battle the Communist forces throughout July around Xi'an.

In August 1949, Ma Bufang personally traveled by plane to the KMT government in Guangzhou in order to request supplies via airdrop, while his son Ma Jiyuan assumed command over the KMT forces at Lanzhou, who promised to defend the city from the Communists, saying "那是一定的 (Na shih yi ting ti)", meaning "That is definite" and, "Lanchow [sic] will never fall to the Communists". However, the government denied Ma Bufang's request, and he flew back to Lanzhou before abandoning the city, retreating all the way back to Xining on trucks. He defended Gansu during the Lanzhou Campaign from the Communists.

Ma was also married to two women and enjoyed watching American movies. His upbringing was under strict discipline; Chinese proverbs could be found posted around his HQ.

He moved with his father to Egypt then to Saudi Arabia when his father was appointed as ambassador of the Republic of China to Saudi Arabia. In between the move he also traveled to Taiwan to advise the Ministry of National Defense and the Kuomintang.

Ma Jiyuan's passing in Mecca, on 27 February 2012, was met with sorrow by the People's Republic of China consulate.

== Career ==
1944 General Officer Commanding 82nd Army
