= Xiong Kuang =

- Ruler of Chu
- Reign: 11th century BC
Full name
- Clan name: 姓 Ancestral temple surname: Mǐ (羋); 氏 Lineage surname: Xióng (熊); Given name: Kuáng (狂)

Xiong Kuang (Chinese: 熊狂, reigned 11th century BC) was an early ruler of the state of Chu during the early Zhou dynasty (1046–256 BC) of ancient China. He succeeded his father Xiong Li, and was succeeded by his son Xiong Yi, who would later be enfeoffed by King Cheng of Zhou and granted the hereditary noble rank of zi (子).

Xiong Kuang House of Mi
Regnal titles
Preceded by Xiong Li	Ruler of Chu; 11th century BC	Succeeded by Xiong Yi as Viscount of Chu
