= Xiong Xianghui =

Chinese communist spy and official

- 熊向晖
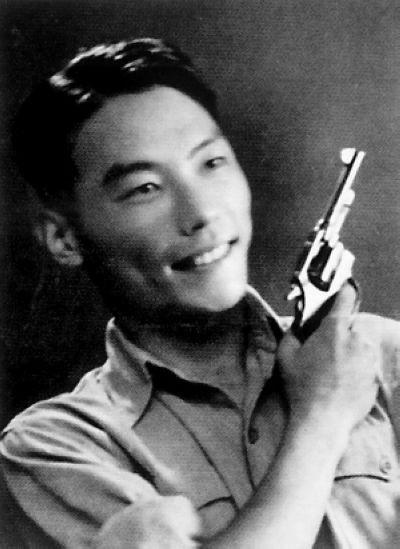
- Xiong Xianghui in the 1940s.

Deputy Director of the Central Investigation Department
- In office 1973–1982

Private Secretary and Aide-de-camp to Hu Zongnan
- In office 1938–1947

Vice Chairman and Party Secretary of the China International Trust Investment Corporation
- In office 1982–1987

Chinese chargé d'affaires to the United Kingdom
- In office 1962–1967

Assistant to the Minister of Foreign Affairs of the PRC
- In office 1954–1971

PRC Ambassador to Mexico
- In office 1972–1973
- Preceded by: none

Personal details
- Born: April 12, 1919 Laizhou, Shandong, Republic of China
- Died: September 9, 2005 (aged 86) Beijing, People's Republic of China
- Party: Chinese Communist Party
- Other political affiliations: Guomindang (1936–1947)
- Spouse: Chen Xiaohua
- Children: Xiong Lei; Name Unknown
- Education: Central Military Academy; Western Reserve University
- Occupation: Spy, Diplomat

Military service
- Allegiance: People's Republic of China
- Battles/wars: Chinese Civil War

Xiong Xianghui (Note: In this Chinese name, the family name is Xiong.) (April 12, 1919 – September 9, 2005) was a Chinese Communist Party spy during the Chinese Civil War, and, after the establishment of the People's Republic of China, a high-ranking official in diplomacy and intelligence. He played a role in the victory of the Chinese Communist Party over the Kuomintang in the Chinese Civil War, in his capacity as private secretary and aide-de-camp to Hu Zongnan, one of the most senior Nationalist generals; Xiong was secretly a Communist mole and for many years passed highly sensitive information to the Communist Party leadership, including top-secret orders and documents of Chiang Kai-Shek.

After 1949, he held important diplomatic posts, serving as chargé d'affaires to the United Kingdom and ambassador to Mexico. His career culminated in the 1970s and 1980s, when he was appointed deputy director of the Central Investigation Department (the primary Chinese civilian intelligence agency at the time) from 1973 to 1982, and vice chairman and CCP committee secretary of the multi-billion China International Trust Investment Corporation (CITIC) from 1982 to 1987.

== Early life and education ==
Born in Laizhou, Shandong, Xiong Xianghui came from a prominent family with roots in Fengyang County, Anhui. His father was a high-ranking judge who served as President of the High Court of both Hubei and Hunan provinces. In 1936, Xiong began studying at the Department of Chinese Language and Literature of Tsinghua University, where he was secretly recruited to the Chinese Communist Party.

== Career ==
After the outbreak of the Second Sino-Japanese War in 1937, Xiong was ordered by the Communist Party to rush to Changsha in order to sign up for the Hunan Youth Battlefield Service Corps headed by Li Fanglan in General Hu Zongnan's First Army, in the hope of successfully penetrating the Nationalist military. Because of his strong family connections and his own skill and cleverness, Xiong caught the eye of Hu Zongnan who first sent him to study at the accelerated course of the Central Military Academy (which lasted a year) and, after his graduation as an infantry second lieutenant, named Xiong his private secretary (or mishu) and aide-de-camp. For the next 9 years, until 1947, Xiong would secretly pass countless top-secret documents to the Communist leadership.

His most critical contribution came in March 1947, when Hu Zongnan, under orders from Chiang Kai-Shek, moved to attack Yan'an. Although Hu was successful in the "lightning attack" operation to sack Yan'an, he was unable to capture or kill the CCP leadership, as Xiong Xianghui had secretly managed to warn the CCP leadership two weeks prior to the Nationalist assault. Xiong's warning gave the CCP leadership enough time to relocate to Zhangjiakou. Xiong had also provided the CCP with Hu's battle plans and elements of private conversations he had overheard with Chiang Kai-shek, which would cause immense damage to Hu's forces and to the wider Nationalist war effort thereafter.

In late 1947, Hu Zongnan (still completely unaware of Xiong's secret Communist allegiance) sent Xiong to study abroad, at Western Reserve University in the United States, where Xiong stayed until 1949, earning a master's degree in Social Sciences. Xiong had a long diplomatic career after returning to China, ultimately serving in key posts and alongside Mao Zedong and Zhou Enlai, with whom he had a lifelong friendship. Most notably, he served as:

- Deputy Director of the Information Department of the Ministry of Foreign Affairs (1949–1962)
- Assistant to the Minister of Foreign Affairs (1954–1971)
- Chargé d'affaires to the United Kingdom (1962–1967)
- Persecuted and criticized from 1967 to 1969, due to the Cultural Revolution
- Deputy Director of the 2nd Bureau (Intelligence) of the PLA General Staff (1970–1972), under General Zhang Ting
- Ambassador to Mexico (1972–1973)
- Deputy Director of the Central Investigation Department (1973–1982), under Luo Qingchang
- Vice Chairman and Party Secretary of the China International Trust Investment Corporation or CITIC (1982–1987)

Additionally, Xiong Xianghui served as a member of the Standing Committee of the 5th and 7th National Committees of the Chinese People's Political Consultative Conference (CPPCC), secretary–general of the Chinese People's Institute of Foreign Affairs and member of the Chinese People's Association for Friendship with Foreign Countries.

== Personal life and death ==
Xiong died of cancer in Beijing in September 2005, at the age of 86, three years after his wife, Chen Xiaohua, with whom he had two children.
