= Shu (surname) =

Shu (Chinese: 舒; pinyin: Shū) is a Chinese surname. It is 43rd in the Hundred Family Surnames, contained in the verse 熊紀舒屈 (Xiong, Ji, Shu, Qu). Šumuru sinicized their clan name to the Chinese surnames Shu (舒), Xu (徐) or Xiao (蕭) after the demise of the Qing dynasty.

According to the a 2013 study, it is the 143rd most common surname, being shared by 1.09 million people, or 0.082% of the population, with Hunan being the province with the most people sharing the name.

In ancient usage, the characters of meng (孟) (bo 伯 bearing the same notion), zhong (仲), shu (叔) and ji (季) were used to denote the first, second, third and fourth (or last) eldest sons in a family.

The Vietnamese version of the name is Thư, but it is extremely rare.

"Shu" can also be a romanization for Xú (徐) or Xǔ (许).

== Notable people ==
- Consort Shu (1728 – 1777), of the Manchu Plain Yellow Banner Yehe Nara clan, was a consort of the Qianlong Emperor
- Quan-Sheng Shu (simplified Chinese: 舒全胜) an American physicist and a naturalized American citizen who was convicted of intellectual property crimes and bribery
- Shu Hongbing (Chinese: 舒红兵; born 1967) is a Chinese cytologist and immunologist
- Shu Chang (actress) (Chinese: 舒畅, born 1987) is a Chinese actress, singer, and television host
- Shu Chang (footballer) (舒畅; born 1977) is a former Chinese football defender who played his entire career with Shandong Luneng

=== Stagenames ===
- Lin Li-hui (Chinese: 林立慧; pinyin: Lín Lìhuì, born 16 April 1976), better known by her stage name Shu Qi (Chinese: 舒淇; pinyin: Shū Qí), is a Taiwanese-Hong Kong actress and model
