= Qu Ding =

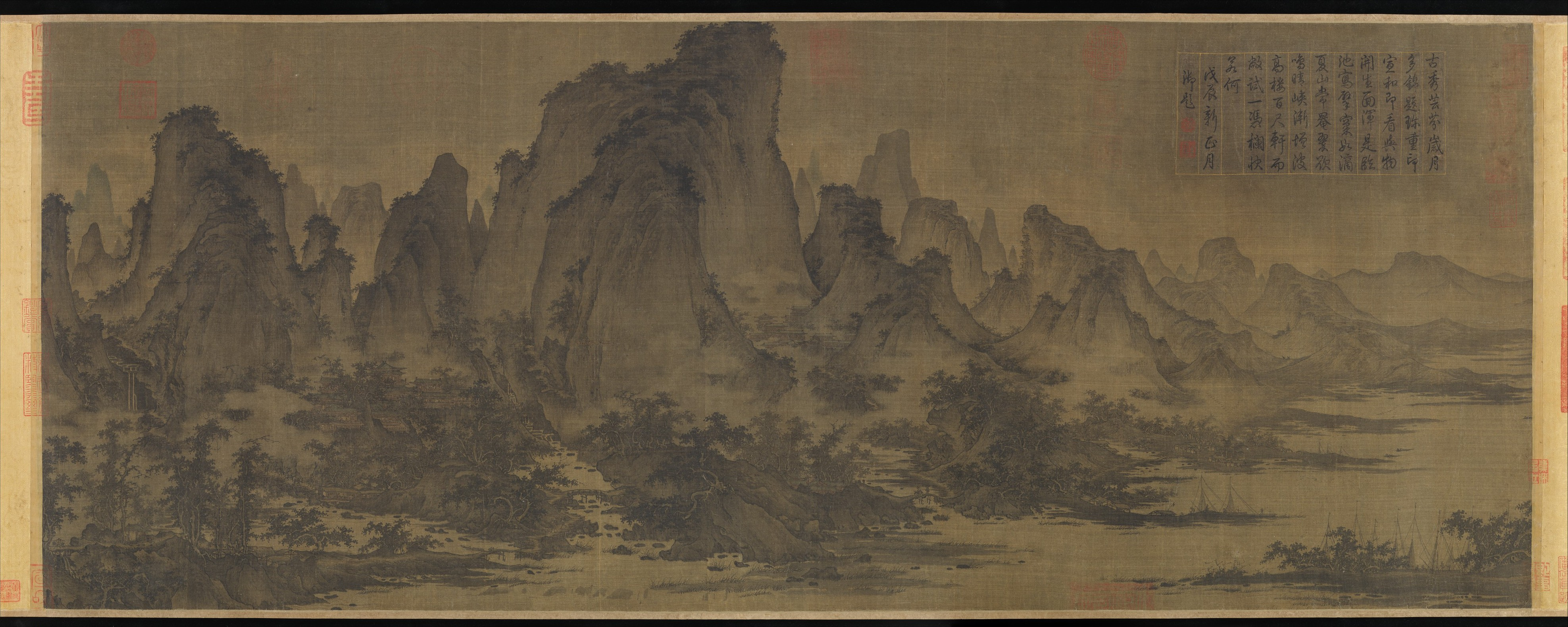
Summer Mountains

Qu Ding (ca. 1023–ca. 1056) (Chinese: 屈鼎) was a Chinese painter of the Song dynasty.

He learned the art of painting from Yan Wengui, a master artist of that time period. His work, Summer Mountains, currently held at the Metropolitan Museum of Art, is perhaps the only work of his that has survived to the present day. His paintings of landscapes bring out a panoramic view of mountains and rivers. Summer Mountains bears the seal of Emperor Huizong of Song, a noted patron of the arts and himself an artist, which may imply that Qu Ding was a court painter in the court of Huizong.

== See also ==
- Qu (surname 屈)
