= Xiong (surname) =

- Xiong surname in regular script
- Pronunciation: Xióng (Pinyin); Hîm, Hiông (Pe̍h-ōe-jī)
- Language: Chinese

Origin
- Language: Old Chinese
- Derivation: Jilian
- Meaning: 'bear'

Other names
- Variant forms: Xiong, Hsiung (Mandarin); Xyooj (Hmong); Hung, Hong (Cantonese); Him (Hokkien); Hong, Yoong (Hakka); Hiōng (Gan); Hùng (Vietnamese)
- Cognate: Mi (surname) (芈)
- See also: Zhurong (祝融)

Xiong is the pinyin romanization of the Chinese surname 熊 (Xióng). It is 41st in the Hundred Family Surnames, contained in the verse 熊紀舒屈 (Xiong, Ji, Shu, Qu).

== Romanizations ==
熊 is also romanized as Hsiung^{2} in Wade-Giles. It is Hung or Hong in Cantonese; Him in Hokkien, Hong or Yoong in Hakka; Hiōng in Gan; Hùng in Vietnamese; and Xyooj in Hmong.

Note that "Hong" and "Hung" may also refer to the unrelated surname 洪.

== Distribution ==
熊 is the 71st most common surname in mainland China.

Although Chinese make up the largest part of the United States' population of Asian Pacific Americans, none of the romanizations of 熊 appeared among the 1000 most common surnames during the 2000 United States census.

== Origins ==
Xiong's literal meaning is "bear".

In ancient China, it was used as a clan name by a branch of the Mi (芈), the royal family of the state of Chu. As recorded by Sima Qian, they claimed descent from Zhuanxu, a son of the Yellow Emperor in Chinese mythology, and Yuxiong (鬻熊), a tutor of the King Wen of Zhou in the 11th century BC. After the victory of the King Wu of Zhou over the Shang dynasty at the Battle of Muye c. 1046 BC, Yuxiong's descendants supposedly remained prominent at the Zhou court and took the surname Xiong. The King Cheng of Zhou (r. 1042–1021 BC) then appointed Xiong Yi, Yuxiong's great-grandson, viscount of the fief of Chu. More likely, the clan name is a calque of a non-Sinitic dynasty, with modern scholarship believing the character 芈 was used to transcribe a Kam–Tai word also meaning "bear".

Eventually rising to the status of kings, the family retained control of Chu until its conquest by Qin during the Warring States period. Some regained control of later successor states and the surname remains prominent in the provinces formerly comprising the territory of Chu.

== List of persons with the surname ==
=== Xiong ===
- Xiong Ni, Chinese diver and triple Olympic gold medalist
- Xiong Qinglai, Chinese mathematician
- Xiong Xianghui, Chinese diplomat
- Xiong Shili, Chinese philosopher
- Xiong Xiling, Chinese philanthropist and politician
- Xiong Zhaoren, Chinese general
- Hui Xiong, data scientist
- Jeffery Xiong, United States chess grandmaster
- Dylan Xiong Ziqi, Chinese artist
- Li Xiong (computer scientist)
- Yee Leng Xiong, American politician in Wisconsin

=== Hsiung ===
- Chao Agnes Hsiung, Taiwanese biostatistician
- Hsiung Shih-I, Chinese writer
- Tiffany Hsiung, Canadian documentary filmmaker

=== Hung ===
- Lynn Hung, Chinese model

=== Song ===
- Brenda Song, Hmong American actress

=== Yoong ===
- Alex Yoong, Malaysian race car driver

=== Him ===
- Him Tek Jie (熊德怡; Tedy Jusuf), retired Indonesian brigadier general
