= Heshui Campaign =

1947 military campaign

- Part of Chinese Civil War
Date	May 28, 1947 – May 31, 1947
Location	Eastern Gansu, Northwestern China
Result	Nationalist victory

Belligerents
Flag of the National Revolutionary Army National Revolutionary Army	PLA People's Liberation Army

Commanders and leaders
Ma Jiyuan; Ma Bufang	Wang Zhen

Strength
3,500	6,500

Casualties and losses
800 killed 720 wounded	2,500

Heshui Campaign (simplified Chinese: 合水战役; traditional Chinese: 合水戰役; pinyin: Héshuǐ zhànyì), consisted of several fierce battles fought between the communists and the nationalist Ma clique's force, which consisted mostly of cavalry. The campaign was fought in the post-World War II era in the eastern Gansu province in northwestern China during the Chinese Civil War, and it was one of the few conflicts from which the nationalists emerged as the victor.

== Prelude ==
After the Panlong Campaign, the communist force under the command of Peng Dehuai in northwest China had scored three consecutive victories against its nationalist adversary, and had forced the nationalists in northwestern China to cease further offensives. Both sides took rest and the communists held a celebration in the Ansai (安塞) region during this break. Zhou Enlai personally went to join the celebration on Mao Zedong's behalf and suggested that Peng's force should take the opportunity to take a much-needed break while the nationalists were resting, but Peng Dehuai disagreed because the Ansai region was a very poor region lacking any resources and thus could not support his large army numbering in the tens of thousands. Instead, Peng Dehuai suggested that his force should strike toward eastern Gansu while the local nationalist force under the command of Hu Zongnan was resting, so that the communists could replenish themselves in the newly conquered area in eastern Gansu. When Peng's suggestion was finally telegraphed to Mao Zedong on May 14, 1947, Mao replied the same day and agreed. Peng Dehuai also hoped that taking eastern Gansu would force the Ma clique to redeploy its forces and thus provide an opportunity for another communist victory, as he and Xi Zhongxun had told Mao in their telegraph on May 28.

On May 21, 1947, the communists started their push toward eastern Gansu, in three fronts from the Ansai region under the personal command of Peng Dehuai: the communist 1st Column was at the right, and the Newly Organized 4th Brigade was at the center, while the 2nd Column under the command of Wang Zhen was on the left. The town of Heshui (合水) which was in nationalist hands was selected as the primary target due to the region originally being an area of active communist guerrilla activities before World War II as well as being the place where Mao Zedong's force met with local Chinese Red Army commanded by Xie Zichang (谢子长) and Liu Zhidan (刘志丹) at the end of the Long March. During World War II, the region was granted by the nationalist government of Chiang Kai-shek to the communists as their area of control, so that the communists were legally allowed to station the 358th Brigade of the Eighth Route Army under the command of Wang Hongqian (王宏坤) in the region and turn it into a communist base. The communist 358th Brigade was headquartered at Qingyang (庆阳) while the 770th Regiment under the command of Zhang Caiqian (张才千) was stationed at Heshui. It was only after World War II, that the nationalists were able to retake the region from the communists.

== First stage ==
After the 48th Brigade of the nationalist Reorganized 17th Division was annihilated by the enemy in the Battle of Xihuachi, the nationalists lacked sufficient troops to fill the new gaps in their defense. As a result, the remaining nationalist garrison was gravely overstretched and the nationalist northern flank was dangerously exposed. In order to boost local defense, the nationalist Reorganized 82nd Division was deployed to Pingliang in eastern Gansu in early 1947. To strengthen the defense of the triangular region bordered by regions of Western Peak (Xi Feng, 西峰), Ning (宁) County, and Zhenyuan (镇原), the Reorganized 8th Cavalry Brigade (without its Heavy Weaponry Battalion and its 1st Regiment) of the nationalist Reorganized 82nd Division was deployed to Qingyang. The 1st Regiment of the Reorganized 8th Cavalry Brigade of the nationalist Reorganized 82nd Division was deployed to Red City (Chi Cheng, 赤城), southeast of Qingyang. The Heavy Weaponry Battalion of the Reorganized 8th Cavalry Brigade of the nationalist Reorganized 82nd Division was tasked to defend Heshui with the help of the Gansu 2nd Security Regiment. The Independent 5th Cavalry Regiment of the nationalist Reorganized 82nd Division was deployed to Zhengning (正宁). The 1st Regiment of the Reorganized 100th Brigade of the nationalist Reorganized 82nd Division was deployed to Ning County, and the 2nd Regiment of the Reorganized 100th Brigade of the nationalist Reorganized 82nd Division was deployed to the town of Early Victory (Zao Sheng, 早胜), and the 3rd Regiment of the Reorganized 100th Brigade of the nationalist Reorganized 82nd Division was deployed to the town of Zhenyuan. Qinghai 1st Security Cavalry Regiment was deployed to Jingchuan (泾川), while Qinghai 2nd Security Cavalry Regiment was tasked to defend Pingliang with the help of 2nd Company of the 2nd Regiment of the Reorganized 8th Cavalry Brigade of the nationalist Reorganized 82nd Division. The 2nd Regiment of the Reorganized 8th Cavalry Brigade and other units of the nationalist Reorganized 82nd Division including the field hospital, the engineering battalion, the communication battalion, the transportation company, the garrison group and others were deployed to Western Peak and Xiaojing (萧金) regions.

After the nationalist Reorganized 82nd Division had pushed toward eastern Gansu, the nationalists had successfully driven the local communist guerillas into the mountains of Meridian Ridge (Zi Wu Ling, 子午岭) in four weeks by taking advantage of their cavalry and the adaptation of their own guerrilla tactic against communist guerillas. Although the nationalists were expecting the enemy would attack in great numbers eventually, they had not anticipated the assault by the enemy main force would come so soon, and thus initially believed it was just the enemy guerillas grouped together for a counterattack, instead of the main force of the regular communist army. The defenders of Heshui, nonetheless, was well armed to take care themselves: the Heavy Weaponry Battalion of the Reorganized 8th Cavalry Brigade of the nationalist Reorganized 82nd Division at Heshui included an infantry support gun company, an anti-tank gun company, a heavy machine gun company and a communication platoon, and the battalion is one of the best unit among Ma clique's forces that were experts in urban defense. The Heavy Weaponry Battalion of the Reorganized 8th Cavalry Brigade of the nationalist Reorganized 82nd Division was further assisted by the Gansu 2nd Security Regiment whose troops were all locals who were very familiar with local terrain. The nationalist Reorganized 82nd Division Ma Jiyuan (马继援) had so much confident in this urban defense garrison of 1,300 men that he deployed them in the exposed town of Heshui, and history would later prove that he was right and his men would not disappoint him.

== Order of battle ==
Defenders: nationalist order of battle

- Reorganized 8th Cavalry Brigade of the nationalist Reorganized 82nd Division
- Garrison Group (Regiment) of the nationalist Reorganized 82nd Division
- Gansu 2nd Security Regiment

Attackers: communist order of battle

- 359th Brigade of the communist 2nd Column
- Independent 4th Brigade of the communist 2nd Column
- Instructional Brigade of the communist 2nd Column

== Second stage ==
The detachments of communist 2nd Column under the command of Wang Zhen crossed Meridian Ridge and approached the town of Heshui. The 359th Brigade of the communist 2nd Column was assigned to take the town while the Instructional Brigade and the Independent 4th Brigade of the communist 2nd Column were tasked to ambush the reinforcement. As the 1st Regiment of the Instructional Brigade reached the Wormwood Grass Shop (Hao Cao Pu, 蒿草铺) area of Luo Er Plateau (Luo Er Yuan, 罗儿塬) region 10 km from Heshui, the communist scouts ahead were ambushed by the local nationalist cavalry on patrol. In a brief but fierce battle, a communist scout was captured alive by the nationalist cavalry. The communists feared that their plan was to be compromised, and attempted to rescue the captured scout, but Luo Er Plateau was a place extremely difficult to take but very easy to defend due to its terrain, and the 1st Regiment of the Instructional Brigade of the communist 2nd Column was forced to abort their futile attempts and move to the planned destination. The attackers therefore lost the element of surprise. At 4:00 AM on May 28, 1947, the 717th Regiment of the 359th Brigade made contact with nationalist garrison of Heshui to the northwest of the town, and all nationalists outside the town soon retreated behind the city wall. The commander of the Heavy Weaponry Battalion of the Reorganized 8th Cavalry Brigade of the nationalist Reorganized 82nd Division, Ma Shengzhi (马生智), radioed the headquarters of the nationalist Reorganized 82nd Division at the town of Western Peak, claiming that the battle had already been raged on. By the evening of May 28, 1947, Ma Shengzhi radioed for help again, claiming that large enemy force was approaching the town of Heshui.

The enemy attackers were headed by Guo Peng (郭鹏), the commander of the 359th Brigade of the communist 2nd Column. The 12th Regiment of the Independent 4th Brigade of the communist 2nd Column was also sent to join the assault on the town. The 717th Regiment of the 359th Brigade of the communist 2nd Column attack the town from northwest, while the 718th Regiment of the 359th Brigade and the 12th Regiment of the Independent 4th Brigade of the communist 2nd Column attacked the town from the east, and the 719th Regiment of the 359th Brigade of the communist 2nd Column was kept as reserve. However, the attacking communists were prevented from approaching the city wall, and it was not until the morning when the attacking enemy discovered why: the city wall extended toward a plateau to the northwest of the town, and defenders atop of the city wall on this plateau had perfect firing positions that could effectively block any attackers' advance toward the town. The defenders had deployed not only mortar and anti-tank guns, but several heavy machine guns as well. After futile attacks that lasted for an entire day and night, the attackers finally realized that this extension must be taken but with the current strength they had, they were simply unable to achieve this impossible task, and Guo Peng, the commander of the 359th Brigade of the communist 2nd Column, who was in the southwestern suburb of the town directing the battle, and he had no choice but to deploy the reserve, the 719th Regiment of the 359th Brigade of the communist 2nd Column ahead of schedule to attack the extension. By the noon of May 29, 1947, the 718th Regiment of the 359th Brigade and the 12th Regiment of the Independent 4th Brigade of the communist 2nd Column were able to take nationalist strongholds in the east and south just outside the city wall, and Eastern Pass (Dong Guan, 东关) of the town fell into the 718th Regiment of the 359th Brigade of the communist 2nd Column by the afternoon. After preparation, the 719th Regiment of the 359th Brigade of the communist 2nd Column launched its assault on the northwestern extension of the nationalist defense, but the defenders would not let them succeed: while the enemy was busy attacking, the defenders sent out a large force via tunnels to counterattack the attacking enemy from behind, and inflicted heavy casualties on the communist attackers, which was forced to halt their attack.

The stubborn and successful nationalist defense of the town of Heshui was completed unexpected by the enemy, who was hoping for an easy victory, and Wang Zhen, the commander of the communist 2nd Column, had to go to the front line to direct the combat himself. By the evening, the battle mainly continued at the southern sections of the city wall and enemy artillery heavily shelled the nationalist positions in the night. By midnight, the attacking enemy had blown away all of the obstacles outside, but failed to blow up the gate and a section of city wall as they had hoped, and the charging enemy force discovered that there were no gaps they could utilize after reaching the city wall. Taking the advantage, the defenders mobilized everyone including cooks and medics to launch an all-out counterattack, again inflicting heavy casualties on the trapped enemy at the foot of the city wall, especially the 718th Regiment of the 359th Brigade and the 12th Regiment of the Independent 4th Brigade of the communist 2nd Column. After more than two hours of fierce fighting, the defenders had successfully beaten back the enemy once again. The defenders suffered heavily in the counterattack, with the commander of the nationalist Gansu 2nd Security Regiment, Li Hongxuan (李鸿轩), badly wounded in the battle. The attackers would later learn after the campaign that the same extension of the urban defense that prevented them from taking the town had also prevented Li Zicheng from doing so three hundred years before for three times, and it was only after the extension was neutralized, that Li Zicheng and his peasantry army were able to finally succeed in taking the town of Heshui.

== Third Stage ==
On May 29, 1947, the news of the enemy besieging the town of Heshui had finally struck the commander of the nationalist Reorganized 82nd Division guarding the town of Western Peak, Ma Jiyuan, who realized this was not a concentration of enemy guerillas attempting to harassing the local garrison, so he ordered the nationalist Reorganized 8th Cavalry Brigade at Qingyang to reinforce the besieged town, under the leadership of its brigade commander Ma Buluan (马步銮), with the 1st Regiment of the nationalist Reorganized 8th Cavalry Brigade as the advance guard. The 1st Regiment of the nationalist Reorganized 8th Cavalry Brigade was originally the nationalist 1st Cavalry Division which was later renamed as the 8th Cavalry Division during the Second Sino-Japanese War, and it was stationed in eastern Henan, fighting countless battles with the Japanese invaders who grew to respect the nationalist cavalry unit, calling it "Ma's Islamic Division". After World War II, the unit returned to Qinghai from Xuzhou and was subsequently reorganized as the 1st Regiment of the Reorganized 8th Cavalry Brigade of the nationalist Reorganized 82nd Division. When the nationalist Reorganized 82nd Division was deployed to eastern Gansu during the Chinese Civil War, the 1st Regiment of the Reorganized 8th Cavalry Brigade of the nationalist Reorganized 82nd Division was deployed to the town of Red City (Chi Cheng, 赤城) 15 km southeast of Qingyang. However, units of the Independent Brigade of the communist 2nd Column had already infiltrated into regions south of Qingyang, and unaware of the enemy strength, the nationalists did not want to risk being ambushed on the way, so they decided to concentrate their forces by going to Qingyang after leaving Red City. As a result, when the nationalist reinforcement finally begun their march toward Heshui, it was already late in the evening. In order to save time, the nationalists took a route in a valley 15 km to the east of Qingyang without sending out scouts ahead.

Around the same time the nationalist Reorganized 8th Cavalry Brigade left Qingyang to reinforce Heshui on May 29, 1947, the 1st Regiment of the Instructional Brigade of the communist 2nd Column reached Cypress Plateau, the chokepoint of the traffic to Heshui. The exhausted communists did not even bother to build any temporary fortifications. Luo Shaowei (罗少伟), the commander of the 1st Regiment of the Instructional Brigade of the communist 2nd Column deployed the 3rd Battalion of the regiment to the south of the road, while the 2nd Battalion was deployed atop Northern Plateau (Bei Yuan, 北塬) in the north, while the 1st Battalion acted as reserve. With the exception of a single platoon on guard, the rest of the exhausted communists camped in the open and went to sleep. At 5:00 AM on May 30, 1947, the nationalist reinforcement approached the communist camp, and made contact with the communist platoon on guard. Once hearing the gunshots, the communists immediately jumped to their feet and 3rd Battalion of the 1st Regiment of the Instructional Brigade of the communist 2nd Column was the first one to act. Zhang Peiran (张沛然), and Qiu Deshan (邱德山), the commander and the political commissar of the 3rd Battalion of the 1st Regiment of the Instructional Brigade of the communist 2nd Column immediately organized their troops and directed machine gun and mortar crew to fire at the nationalists. Zhu Zhongxin (朱中新), the political commissar of the 2nd Battalion of the 1st Regiment of the Instructional Brigade of the communist 2nd Column was just getting up to urinate when the battle broke out, and he immediately woke up his troops and with the help of Zhang Shunguo (张顺国), the battalion commander, led their battalion to reinforce their comrades.

The sudden contact with the enemy was equally unexpected by and surprising the nationalists when they were moving fast in the valley. Ma Buluan (马步銮), the commander of the nationalist Reorganized 8th Cavalry Brigade immediately ordered his troops to take the high ground on both sides to avoid being pinned down by the enemy. The advance guard of the nationalist reinforcement led by the company commander Ma Guochen (马国臣) climbed to the top of Southern Plateau (Nan Yuan, 南塬), while the rest of the nationalists climbed to the top of Northern Plateau. At the dawn, the nationalist main force atop Northern Plateau had beaten back the attack by the 3rd Regiment of the Instructional Brigade of the communist 2nd Column, and the nationalist advance guards atop Southern Plateau originally appeared to be also successful in beating back the attack of the Garrison Platoon of the 1st Regiment of the Instructional Brigade of the communist 2nd Column. However, the 2nd Battalion of the 1st Regiment of the Instructional Brigade of the communist 2nd Column reached in time and helped their comrades to counterattack, surrounding the nationalist advance guards in three sides. The nationalist main force atop Northern Plateau could not provide fire support to their comrades-in-arms because the two sides were engaged in close quarter combats, and Lieutenant Colonel Suo Shijun (索世俊) lead a team of three dozen men charged the enemy, successfully disrupted the enemy's counterattack and thus allowed the besieged nationalist advance guards to escape. However, by this time, one third of the 400+ strong nationalist advance guards had already been lost, and the company commander Ma Guochen who led the nationalist advance guards lost both his legs due to enemy fire. The nationalists was forced to a temporary retreat and headed back to Qingyang.

== Fourth Stage ==
At Heshui, the 719th Regiment of the 359th Brigade of the communist 2nd Column spent a day and a night to attack the town without any success. The political commissar of the communist 2nd Column, Wang Enmao (王恩茂) reached the positions held by the 359th Brigade of the communist 2nd Column in person in order to discuss the next move with Guo Peng (郭鹏), the commander of the communist 359th Brigade in the morning of May 30, 1947. One suggestion was to take concentrate all available force to take the town first and then attack the hill to the north, but this suggestion was turned down by Guo Peng, the commander of the communist 359th Brigade, because if the strategic position of Northern Hill was not taken, the communists would be driven out of the town even if the town had been taken. The dispute reached Wang Zhen, the commander of the communist 2nd Column and he telephoned back that he agreed with Guo Peng, giving his permission to attack the Northern Hill to at the northern edge of the town. After an entire day of preparation, the communists renewed their assault on the town in the evening with the 717th Regiment of the 359th Brigade of the communist 2nd Column as the main attacker, assisted by a detachment of the 719th Regiment of the 359th Brigade of the communist 2nd Column. However, heavy rain had helped the defenders to beaten back numerous assaults launched by the attackers, inflicting heavy casualties on the attackers.

The political commissar of the communist 2nd Column, Wang Enmao (王恩茂) wrote in his diary later to record the blunders committed by the attacking communists which resulted in failure and the first was the uncompromising doctrine strictly followed: once the proved to be ineffective, nobody thought about changing the tactic, instead, the ineffective tactic was continued. Once reaching the enemy, no temporary fortifications were built and personnel were exposed under direct fire. During the assault, nobody crawled, thus providing defenders with excellent target in the standing up position, and nobody had hit the dirty when the defenders had thrown hand grenades among the attackers. The communist artillery shelling was disorganized and could not coordinate with infantry. There was a general lack of knowledge of taking cover in favorable terrain and thus the defenders had easy time of targeting and aiming. The communist casualty was so high that even an experienced veteran like the political commissar of the communist 2nd Column, Wang Enmao who had been in many fierce battles and campaigns was shocked. Behind the city wall, the defenders considered that they had suffered equally bad. The Heavy Weaponry Battalion of the nationalist Reorganized 8th Cavalry Brigade alone suffered more than three hundred casualties, including many company level and platoon level commanders. Both the commander and the deputy commander of the anti-tank gun company were severely wounded by the enemy shelling, losing their legs. The regimental commander of the nationalist Gansu 2nd Security Regiment, Li Hongxuan (李鸿轩), was also wounded. The most serious setback for the defenders, however, was that the only radio in the town was destroyed in the battle so the besieged town lost contact with other nationalist units.

== Fifth Stage ==
After retreating to Qingyang, the nationalists regrouped, and planned for another attempt to reinforce the besieged town of Heshui. Ma Buluan, the commander of the nationalist Reorganized 8th Cavalry Brigade, had a new plan for the next move and his plan was supported by Ma Jiyuan, the commander of the nationalist Reorganized 82nd Division. Ma Buluan was very happy that his new plan was approved and immediately ordered his troops to set out again at noon on May 30, 1947, after reaching Qingyang two hours ago, and this time the nationalists were better prepared: Tan Shilin (谭世麟), the local security chief of Qingyang and other locals went along as guides, and the nationalists found trails that lead to Heshui from Qingyang via the Willow Ditch (Liu Gou, 柳沟) area of Northern Plateau region. The 1st Company and the 2nd Company of the 1st Regiment of the nationalist Reorganized 8th Cavalry Brigade were the advanced guards. In the meantime, the enemy also made new deployment: the Independent 4th Brigade of the communist 2nd Column was ordered to immediately join the Instructional Brigade of the communist 2nd Column who had beaten back the first nationalist reinforcement attempt and both communist brigades set up a defense at Vesper Col (Tai Bai Ao, 太白坳) region in order to check the advance of the nationalist reinforcement for a second time. On May 30, 1947, Hu Zongnan sent an airplane from Xi'an at noon to check if the nationalists were still fighting in Heshui. After confirming that the town was still firmly in the nationalist hands, the sole airplane dropped the few bombs on the enemy positions outside the city wall, though all of them had missed their targets because the pilot was forced to pull up to the high altitude in order to avoid enemy ground fire.

The nationalist reinforcement was sent in three fronts, and the main force of 2,000 consisted of the 2nd Regiment of the Reorganized 8th Cavalry Brigade of the nationalist Reorganized 82nd Division and the Garrison Group of the nationalist Reorganized 82nd Division. The 2nd Regiment of the Reorganized 8th Cavalry Brigade of the nationalist Reorganized 82nd Division was originally organized as the 2nd Cavalry Division during the Second Sino-Japanese War to be sent to central China to fight the Japanese invaders, but they were sent in Shaanxi by Hu Zongnan to blockade communist base. After the end of World War II, the nationalist 2nd Cavalry Division returned to Qinghai, along with nationalist 8th Cavalry Division returning from Xuzhou. The nationalist 2nd Cavalry Division was subsequently reorganized as 2nd Regiment of the nationalist Reorganized 8th Cavalry Brigade, and in May 1947, the unit was selected to reinforce the besieged town of Heshui. The nationalist commander of the campaign, Ma Jiyuan, the commander of the nationalist Reorganized 82nd Division selected his uncle, Ma Bufang's brother-in-law, Lieutenant General Ma Quanyi, the deputy commander of the nationalist Reorganized 82nd Division to be in charge of all of the nationalist reinforcement forces, and his assistant was the divisional staff officer Han Youlu (韩有禄), who was the original regimental commander of the 2nd Regiment of the nationalist Reorganized 8th Cavalry Brigade. One reason why Han Youlu was also sent was because Li Wenbin (李文彬), his replacement after his promotion was selected by the Ma Buluan, the commander of the nationalist Reorganized 8th Cavalry Brigade, but Li Wenbin, the new regimental commander of the 2nd Regiment of the nationalist Reorganized 8th Cavalry Brigade, was not a Muslim and thus might have difficulties in commanding the Muslim troops who were subordinates of Han Youlu, the former regimental commander.

== Sixth Stage ==
The nationalist reinforcement of the central front under the direct command of the deputy commander of the Reorganized 82nd Division, Lieutenant General Ma Quanyi (马全义) left the town of Western Peak (Xi Feng, 西峰), then passed the Relay Station Horse Pass (Yi Ma Guan, 驿马关), and three hours after the 1st Regiment of the nationalist Reorganized 8th Cavalry Brigade under the command of the brigade commander Ma Buluan left Qingyang for the second time, the nationalist reinforcement of the central front also reached town. After a brief stop, the nationalist reinforcement of the central front continued its push toward Heshui by taking the road from Qingyang to Ning County. In order to avoid mistakes made by Ma Buluan, Lieutenant General Ma Quanyi (马全义) ordered his troops to proceed along the mountain ridge after passing Banqiao. By 6:00 PM, the nationalist reinforcement had reached the Vesper Col region, which was guarded by the Instructional Brigade of the communist 2nd Column. At the evening, the 3rd Battalion of the 1st Regiment of the Instructional Brigade of the communist 2nd Column at the Southern Plateau on the left flank made contact with the advancing nationalist cavalry. The 1st Regiment of the Instructional Brigade of the communist 2nd Column had defeated the 1st Regiment of the Reorganized 8th Cavalry Brigade in the morning and thus was eager to score another victory. Cui Yongchen (崔永臣), the commander of the 7th Company of the 3rd Battalion of the 1st Regiment of the Instructional Brigade of the communist 2nd Column ordered to have the advance guard of the nationalist cavalry machined, and the nationalist cavalry behind consequently retreated. As the 2nd Regiment of the Instructional Brigade of the communist 2nd Column at the Northern Plateau heard the gun shots and immediately move joined the battle, blocking the passage of the nationalists. As the prudent Lieutenant General Ma Quanyi who was in command of the nationalist reinforcement discovered that there were enemy in three directions of the Vesper Col region in the east, south, and north, he ordered Li Wenbin (李文彬), the regimental commander of the 2nd Regiment of the nationalist Reorganized 8th Cavalry Brigade to take charge of the nationalist force in the south, and Han Youlu (韩有禄), the deputy commander in charge of the nationalist reinforcement to take charge of the nationalist force in the north to check the enemy's attack. However, the communist attack was simply too ferocious and the nationalist cavalries were forced into a disorganized retreat. Lieutenant General Ma Quanyi personally led the Garrison Squadron to launch a counterattack, but he was shot in the leg, and was hurriedly carried away by his bodyguards, and thus was forced out of action for the rest of the campaign.

At the Southern Plateau are of the Vesper Col region, the 7th Company and the 8th Company of the 3rd Battalion of the 1st Regiment of the Instructional Brigade of the communist 2nd Column had successfully besieged the nationalist cavalries and seeing there was no way to escape, the nationalists deployed a fake surrender tactic by laying down their arms and raised their hands while kneeing down beside their horses after dismounted. Wu Baoliang (吴保良), the company commander of the 8th Company of the 3rd Battalion of the 1st Regiment of the Instructional Brigade of the communist 2nd Column ordered the communists to cease fire and approached the kneeing nationalists to accept the surrender, while Luo Shaowei (罗少伟) and Xiong Guangyan (熊光焰), the commander and the deputy commander of the 1st Regiment of the Instructional Brigade of the communist 2nd Column also approached the nationalists with regimental staff officers to observe the acceptance of the supposed surrender. However, as the communist soldiers approached, the kneeing nationalists suddenly picked up their weapons and opened up on the unsuspecting communists, and as the communists were mauled down, the nationalists quickly jumped up their horses and taking the advantage they inflicted on the enemy, charged out of the siege in chaos, successfully escaped. As soon as the nationalists had opened up on the approaching communists, Luo Shaowei, the commander of the 1st Regiment of the Instructional Brigade of the communist 2nd Column immediately ordered his staff officers behind him to take cover, but he was struck by a bullet fired by the nationalist, and the bullet penetrated his body, continued on, striking Xiong Guangyan (熊光焰), the deputy commander of the 1st Regiment of the Instructional Brigade of the communist 2nd Column behind him, severely wounding both of them. Several hours later, after Luo Shaowei was carried away for medical treatment, he met Luo Yuanfa (罗元发), the commander of the Instructional Brigade of the communist 2nd Column, and the communist commander of the 1st Regiment of the Instructional Brigade of the communist 2nd Column vexedly told his brigade commander:

These bastards were so slick that one shot from them took two of us out!.

== Seventh Stage ==
The 2nd Regiment of the Instructional Brigade of the communist 2nd Column was also fooled by the fake surrender tactic adopted by another group of nationalists. Over two hundred cavalries from the 2nd Regiment of the nationalist Reorganized 8th Cavalry Brigade had hidden in a large Yaodong with several troops waving white flags just outside the door. The 1st Company of the 2nd Regiment of the Instructional Brigade of the communist 2nd Column believed the nationalists and the entire company went forward to accept the supposed surrender, but they were ambushed as two hundred cavalries suddenly charged out the large Yaodong and attacked the unsuspecting communist, and over thirty troops, including He Dadao (何大道), the company commander were killed and the rest of the communist company was scattered. Taking advantage of the successful surprise attack, the nationalist cavalries continued to charge the communist positions which were dangerously undermanned as a result of loss the 1st Company of the 2nd Regiment of the Instructional Brigade of the communist 2nd Column. The political commissar of the 2nd Regiment of the Instructional Brigade of the communist 2nd Column, Guan Shengzhi (关盛志) took a pistol from his bodyguard and shouted:”Counterattack! Nobody is allowed to retreat!” while firing pistols in both hands, charging the enemy, followed by his comrades. In the meantime, the deputy political commissar of the 2nd Regiment of the Instructional Brigade of the communist 2nd Column, Wang Shi (王湜), ordered the heavy weaponry company of the regiment to concentrate its fire on the attacking nationalist cavalry. Under the command of Ma Huiyuan (马会元), the commander of the heavy weaponry company of the 2nd Regiment of the Instructional Brigade of the communist 2nd Column, the communist defenders managed to inflict heavy casualties on the attacking nationalist cavalries but before completely stopping the attacking nationalists, the ammunition ran out. The communist defenders were forced into close quarter battles with the attacking nationalists and both Ma Huiyuan, the commander of the heavy weaponry company of the 2nd Regiment of the Instructional Brigade of the communist 2nd Column and Li Fengming (李风鸣), the commander of the 8th Company of the 2nd Regiment of the Instructional Brigade of the communist 2nd Column were wounded, but the nationalist attack was beaten back once again, and the position was still firmly in the communist hands.

After the retreat, the nationalists of the central front regrouped and launched another round of attack, still targeting the enemy position held by the 2nd Regiment of the Instructional Brigade of the communist 2nd Column while the nationalist forces on the other two fronts moved toward the flanks of the target respectively held by the 1st Regiment of the Instructional Brigade of the communist 2nd Column and the Independent 4th Brigade of the communist 2nd Column. The situation was critical and the political commissar of the communist Instructional Brigade, Yao Zhengxi (饶正锡) personally went to the front to the 2nd Regiment of the Instructional Brigade of the communist 2nd Column to command. The 8th Company of the 2nd Regiment of the Instructional Brigade of the communist 2nd Column was at the most forward position and its commander, Li Fengming (李风鸣) was severely wounded an hour ago in battle, and Zhang Shengke (张升科), the political commissar of the company had to take over, and held a political conference to boost morale. During the next nationalist cavalry charge, the communist defenders were initially successful in inflicting heavy casualties on the attacking nationalists under the command of the political commissar of the 2nd Regiment of the Instructional Brigade of the communist 2nd Column, Guan Shengzhi (关盛志). In the ensuing battle, when the political commissar was observing the enemy movements via binoculars, he was positively identified by the nationalist snipers and consequently was shot in the right arm. However, the communists were able to quickly send the political commissar back for medical treatment and replace him with a new commander, because the Luo Yuanfa (罗元发), the commander of the Instructional Brigade of the communist 2nd Column had just reached the defenders in time to take over. Wei Zhiming (魏志明), the political commissar of the 1st Regiment of the communist Instructional Brigade noticed that the position of the communist 2nd Regiment was in danger of being overrun, and thus personally led several companies to reinforce their comrades by charging the left flank of the attacking nationalist cavalries. The charge was successful and nationalists were unable to launch anymore attacks but the communists were equal worn out. By the evening, a heavy rain provided the a badly needed break for both sides, and it also prevented the communists from engaging the nationalist reinforcement in another front: the nationalist Reorganized 100th Brigade was also ordered by Ma Jiyuan, the commander of the nationalist Reorganized 82nd Division to reinforce the besieged Heshui. The nationalist Reorganized 100th Brigade moved out from its base in Ning County at noon on May 30, 1947, and by the evening, heavy rain prevented it from going any further and Tan Chengxiang (谭呈祥), the commander of the nationalist Reorganized 100th Brigade ordered his soaked troops to stop and camp at Banqiao, 10 km away from Heshui. Despite the sound of guns could be heard, the cautious nationalists were careful not to proceed any further and avoided possible night fighting, a favorite tactic of the enemy.

== Eighth Stage ==
On May 30, 1947, the nationalist Reorganized 8th Cavalry Brigade went to reinforce Heshui again from Qingyang. Ma Buluan, the commander of the nationalist Reorganized 8th Cavalry Brigade found a local resident as a guide, eventually reached the first line of the communist defense to the north of Heshui via Willow Ditch area of Northern Plateau region. The enemy position was manned by the 13th Regiment of the communist Independent 4th Brigade, and advanced guard of the nationalist reinforcement, the 1st Regiment of the nationalist Reorganized 8th Cavalry Brigade had already sent out its 1st Company and 2nd Company on foot toward the flanks of the enemy position under the cover of the dense foliage of the wheat field that had not been harvested yet. Ma Buluan the commander of the nationalist Reorganized 8th Cavalry Brigade discovered that there was a portion of enemy position on top of a stretch of cliff of 4 meters to 5 meters tall, and decided to hide an assault team under the cliff to launch a surprise attack under the cover of heavy artillery shelling. Under the command of Ma Fushou, the staff officer sent from the headquarters of the nationalist Reorganized 82nd Division to help Ma Buluan, the commander of the nationalist Reorganized 8th Cavalry Brigade, the 1st Company and the 2nd Company of the 1st Regiment of the nationalist Reorganized 8th Cavalry Brigade crawled to the bottom of the cliff under the cover of smoke from artillery shelling and then climbed up the cliff in two places. As the nationalist shelling had stopped, the troopers of the 1st Company and the 2nd Company of the 1st Regiment of the nationalist Reorganized 8th Cavalry Brigade charged into the enemy and started a fierce close quarter combat. In the meantime, the nationalist cavalry immediately charged the enemy position from different side in support of their comrades-in-arm. The communists could not stop the nationalist assault and were forced into retreat after abandoning their positions. The nationalist Reorganized 8th Cavalry Brigade chased the retreating enemy all the way until the nightfall, and then Ma Buluan, the commander of the nationalist Reorganized 8th Cavalry Brigade ordered his exhausted troops to stop and camp, despite the fierce battle was still raging on at Heshui.

The communists attacking Heshui did not take any break and Wang Zhen, the commander-in-chief of the communist 2nd Column still wanted to take the city. Three regiments of the communist 359th Brigade and the 12th Regiment of the communist 4th Independent Brigade attacked the city for three times, but all failed due to heavy rain. The communist 718th Regiment planned to join the fight by 8:00 PM on the same day, but this was also delayed due to heavy rain. The headquarters of the communist 2nd Column informed its Instructional Brigade and Independent 4th Brigade that the 1st Regiment of the nationalist Reorganized 8th Cavalry Brigade had approached Heshui (合水), and the two communist brigades launched a huge assault on the nationalist Reorganized 8th Cavalry Brigade that lasted well into the night, but fierce battle had worn out both sides. Han Youlu (韩有禄), the nationalist deputy commander in charge of the overall reinforcement operation took control of the 2nd Regiment of the nationalist Reorganized 8th Cavalry Brigade because Li Wenbin (李文彬), the regimental commander of the 2nd Regiment of the nationalist Reorganized 8th Cavalry Brigade was absent, accurately deduced that something happened at Heshui, and the enemy would withdraw. Surely enough, by next morning, the nationalists discovered that under the cover of darkness and rain, the communists had withdrawn, and the cautious nationalists did not pursuit for fearing enemy ambush. In contrast to the combatant in the fierce battle, the nationalist Reorganized 100th Brigade at Banqiao to the west of the 2nd Regiment of the nationalist Reorganized Cavalry 8th Brigade was able to finally rest comfortably for a night and enjoyed their breakfast in the morning of May 31, 1947. At 10:00 AM, under the brigade commander Tan Chengxiang (谭呈祥), the entire brigade begun their move toward Heshui, and on its way, they were joined by the Garrison Group of the nationalist Reorganized 82nd Division and then continued prudently to reinforce the Heshui.

== Ninth Stage ==
In the morning of May 31, 1947, the rain was not as heavy as the previous day and the communist 359th Brigade resumed its assault on the city. The commander-in-chief of the communist 2nd Column, Wang Zhen, personally directed the 718th Regiment of the 359th Brigade of the communist 2nd Column to attack the southern gate of the city. The communist 718th Regiment had assaulted the southern gate several times without any success on May 29, 1947, and although the last attack in the morning on May 30, 1947, was successful in eliminating all of the obstacles, the attackers' attempt to blow up the gate itself was not successful. On their renewed attack on May 31, 1947, the communist attackers learned from past experience and assaulted the southern gate of the city in two places simultaneously: one team climbed the ladder to the top of the city wall in the rain to distract the defenders while the other team attempted to blow up the gate on the same time. The tactic worked and the communists were finally able to breach the city wall after an hour of fierce battle. The 718th Regiment of the communist 359th Brigade and a battalion of the 12th Regiment of the communist Independent 4th Brigade charged into the city via the gap. After two hours of fierce fighting and suffering heavy casualties, the communist attackers were finally able to force the defenders into northern section of the city. Wang Zhen, the commander of communist 2nd Column telephoned the political commissar of the communist 2nd Column, Wang Enmao (王恩茂) who was at the headquarters of the communist 359th Brigade in the northwestern suburb of the city to return to the headquarters of the communist 2nd Column located in the eastern suburb of the city and told the political commissar that the communists still planned to take the city by the morning. However, this was not to be and things had turned for the worse for the communist attackers.

The 1st Regiment of the nationalist Reorganized 8th Cavalry Brigade suddenly appeared in the northern suburb of Heshui, which was totally unexpected by the communists attacking the city. Guo Peng, the commander of the communist 359th Brigade who was in charge of taking the city immediately ordered a company from the 717th Regiment and another from the 718th Regiment to check the advance of the nationalist reinforcement, but it was already too late. There were no suitable positions for the two communist companies and the best position hastily selected was within the range of defenders' heavy machine gun setup on the city wall. Once the nationalist reinforcement started its charge on the communist positions, it was notice by the defenders on the city wall, who immediately opened up on the communists in attempt to help the nationalist cavalry outside the city wall. The two communist companies were incapable of stopping the nationalist reinforcement when attacked from both the front and back, and not only they lost their positions, most of the troops were killed as well. To the northwest of the city, Guo Peng, the commander of the communist 359th Brigade who was in charge of taking the city, hastily ordered the last communist reserve, the 3rd Battalion of the 717th Regiment of the communist 359th Brigade to stop the nationalist reinforcement, but before the communist 3rd battalion had reached its designated position, the nationalist cavalry reinforcing the city met the battalion head on while in march. The nationalist cavalry immediately launched an attack on its communist enemy and attempted to charge the communist headquarters. After heavy casualties, the communist 3rd battalion was finally able to stop the nationalist cavalry charge. Although the 3rd Battalion of the 717th Regiment of the communist 359th Brigade managed to stop the nationalist cavalry charge to the communist headquarters, it was incapable of stopping the nationalist reinforcement from reaching the city wall. The defenders opened the northern gate and the heavy machine gun company of the heavy weaponry battalion of the nationalist Reorganized 8th Brigade charged out of the city wall from their defensive positions and successfully linked up with over three hundred cavalries, the advance guard of the nationalist reinforcement. Guo Peng, the commander of the communist 359th Brigade was anxious to cut the link between the nationalist defenders of the city and their reinforcement and decided to personally lead the counterattack on the nationalist reinforcement. However, as soon as he stepped out of the shelter, he was struck in the arm by a heavy machine gun bullet fired by the defenders on the city wall, severing the artery and knocked him out cold. As a result, not only the planned counterattack did not materialize, the attackers also lost their command and resulted in chaos.

With the enemy in chaos and reinforcement pouring in from the north gate, the defenders' morale was instantly boosted and a large scale counterattack was immediately launched. The communist force consisted of a battalion of the 12th Regiment of the communist Independent 4th Brigade and the 718th Regiment of the communist 359th Brigade inside the city was annihilated by the renewed counterattack by the defenders. The highest ranked commanders for both communists units, Wu Huamin (吴化民), the chief-of-staff of the 12th Regiment of the communist 4th Brigade and Wu Xidu (吴锡都), the deputy chief-of-staff of the 718th Regiment of the communist 359th Brigade were both killed in action as the communists inside the city attempted to breakout. The communists outside the city wall had completely run out any reserve by this time and could not stop the slaughter of their comrades inside the city. At the same time, the communist 2nd Column learned that the nationalist Reorganized 100th Brigade had left Banqiao and approached Heshui fast, and thus was forced to abandon its effort to take the town. The 12th Regiment of the communist Independent 4th Brigade held the position at Southern Temple Yuan (Nan Si Yuan, 南寺塬) to the south of Heshui while the 718th Regiment of the 359th Brigade held the position at Elang Mountain (E Lang Shan, 二郎山) to cover the communist to the northwest of Heshui. After the complete withdrawal, the nationalist Reorganized 100th Brigade reached the region in the afternoon, and finding no enemy, the 2nd Regiment of the nationalist Reorganized 100th Brigade took over the defense of the city while the nationalist Reorganized 8th Cavalry Brigade withdrew to Western Peak region to regroup and re-supply. Ma Zhongfu (马仲福), a nationalist officer who was the youngest brother of Ma Zhongying was named as the mayor and the commander-in-chief of the urban defense. The campaign concluded with nationalist victory.

== Outcome ==
On May 31, 1947, as Peng Dehuai learned the news of the defeat of the communist 2nd Column, he immediately changed his target of his next battle by telegraphing Mao Zedong on the same day with the local communist party boss Xi Zhongxun, claiming that:

The 82nd Division of the Ma clique in Qinghai was very tough and our force had concentrated in preparation for first annihilating the 81st Division of Ma clique in Ningxia, and then to strike the 82nd Division.

Half a month later, the communist scored a victory in Huan (环) county against the nationalist 81st Division of Ma clique in Ningxia, but it was not until the Xifu Campaign in 1948 did Peng Dehuai was able to fulfill his wish of engaging the nationalist 82nd Division of the Ma clique in Qinghai, but once again, the communist was defeated. Also on May 31, 1947, the political commissar of the communist 2nd Column, Wang Enmao (王恩茂) wrote in his diary admitting that the defeat with extreme heavy casualties, which caused the delay of the Eastern Gansu Campaign planned by the communists. On June 1, 1947, Wang Zhen telegraphed Peng Dehuai and Xi Zhongxun to report that the campaign was lost and Wang Zhen himself was responsible, claiming that the forces of Ma clique in Qinghai was very capable, and they acted swiftly and bravely in battles, and this was not an exaggeration to make any excuses. The communist 359th Brigade along suffered over 800 fatalities and had exhausted most of the ammunition, and thus had to retreat to a different region for several days to regroup and re-supply.

On June 1, 1947, the political commissar of the communist 2nd Column, Wang Enmao wrote in his diary that the 22nd Regiment of the 8th Cavalry Brigade of the nationalist Reorganized 82nd Division was ill-equipped in comparison to other nationalist units and lacked heavy weaponry. However, these nationalist troops were extremely tough and very combat capable. Once their unit was defeated, they could still fight on individually and launch counterattacks, and refused to lay down their arms. Unlike other nationalist units which often ignored the plea of their comrades-in-arms for reinforcement, the forces of the Ma clique in Qinghai not only would reinforce their comrades-in-arms for sure, but they would reinforce their comrades-in-arms multiple times. The communists had gravely underestimated their nationalist opponents in this campaign. The political commissar in his diary concluded that under no circumstance should the enemy be underestimated. The second realization was that the main enemy's position must be taken for the battle to conclude, otherwise, the defenders could launch counterattacks and driven the attackers from the city. The third point was there must be reserves. The fourth was the effectiveness of the artillery bombardment, but one could not solely depend on artillery bombardment, and the fifth point was the need to be always prepared for the enemy's counterattacks. Peng Dehuai instructed the communist 2nd Column to rest of ten days and to use the time to find the mistakes that caused the defeat. Wang Zhen admitted that since he had joined the communist revolution, he fought several hundred battles and there were both victories and defeats, but none of them as bad as in this campaign. Peng Dehuai concluded in late October, 1947 on a conference included commanders of battalion level and above that the main reason of the communist defeat was underestimating the enemy, claiming that branching out in three fronts to attack Ma clique in both Qinghai and Ningxia was a blunder. In his work titled "Combat Evaluations in Shaanxi for the Past Nine Months", Peng Dehuai further admitted that launching another new campaign just thirteen days after the end of Panlong Campaign was also a blunder in that the communists troops were exhausted and had not had the time needed to rest and regroup.

In contrast, the nationalists celebrated the victory in grand scale. After learning the news of the successful beating back the enemy's attack, Ma Bufang ordered the Guo Xueli (郭学礼), the provincial interior minister to organize a large delegation that included the members of Qinghai provincial dance studio to visit the troops participated in the campaign. The delegation visited cities and towns included Western Peak, Qingyang, and Heshui to hold numerous celebrations, and the nationalist central government also issued medals and other rewards to the nationalist troops excelled in the campaign. Ma Jiyuan, the nationalist commander in this campaign also made special trips to Lanzhou and Xining to report on the campaign to Hu Zongnan and Ma Bufang, and the experience gained in this campaign would help the nationalists to defeat their communist enemy once again in Xifu Campaign in 1948.

== See also ==
- Outline of the Chinese Civil War
- National Revolutionary Army
- History of the People's Liberation Army
