= Qu (surname 屈) =

Family name

Qu / Wat
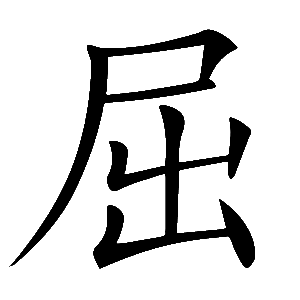
- Romanization: Qu (Mandarin); Wat (Cantonese, Hong Kong, Macau, Guangdong)
- Pronunciation: Qu1 (Mandarin); Wat1 (Cantonese)
- Language: Chinese

Origin
- Language: Old Chinese
- Meaning: "bend; crook; bow; flex"

Other names
- Popularity: see popular names

Qu
- Chinese: 屈
Transcriptions
Standard Mandarin
- Hanyu Pinyin: Qū
- Bopomofo: ㄑㄩ
- Wade–Giles: ch`ü^{1}
- Tongyong Pinyin: cyū
Yue: Cantonese
- Yale Romanization: wat1
- Jyutping: wat1

Qu (Chinese: 屈; pinyin: Qū; Jyutping: wat1) is a Chinese surname. It also transliterated as Chu in Wade–Giles and Wat in Cantonese. It is also transliterated as Qū in pinyin. The surname Qu (屈) is listed 124th on the famous Song dynasty book of common Chinese surnames, Hundred Family Surnames (Chinese: 百家姓), contained in the verse 熊紀舒屈 (Xiong, Ji, Shu, Qu).

== History ==
The origin of the Qu (屈) surname is from the Hubei (湖北) region. Historically, the Hubei region was part of the State of Chu during the Spring and Autumn period of ancient Chinese history. The King Wu of State of Chu awarded his son Xia with the Qu Yi as feud to recognize his outstanding service to the court of Chu. The people called Xia "Qu Xia" and the offspring of Xia adopted Qu as their surname.

The royal family of State of Chu was descendants of Zhuanxu, the grandson of Emperor Huangdi (i.e. Yellow Emperor). Therefore, Qu is also the descendant of Emperor Huangdi. During the reign of the Northern Wei dynasty, the people with last name of Qutu (屈突) adopted Qu as their surname.

The most famous individual with surname Qu, is Qu Yuan, the patriotic poet of the State of Chu in the Warring States period of ancient Chinese history. He is known for his patriotism and contributions to classical poetry and verses, especially through the poems of the Chu Ci (Chinese: 楚辭) and Li Sao (Chinese: 離騷) anthology. His works is still widely read by many people till this very day. On May 5 of every year dragon boat races are held to celebrate the Duanwu Festival across the country and in communities across the world in honor of Qu Yuan.

== Notable people ==
Notable people with the surname Qu/Wat include:

- Historical period (pre-20th century):
  - Qu Yuan (屈原; 340–278 BC), Chinese poet and minister of Chu
  - Qu Ding (屈鼎; ca.1023–ca. 1056), Chinese master painter of the Song dynasty
  - Qu Dajun (屈大均; 1630–1696), Chinese great litterateur of late-Ming and early-Qing dynasty
  - Wat Ngong (屈亞昂;1785–1867), Chinese Protestant convert, evangelist and writer
  - Qu Xia (屈瑕, ? – 699 AD)
  - Qu Yijiu (屈宜臼, ? – ?)
  - Qu Wan (屈完, ? – ?)
- Modern period (20th century and later):
  - Qu Yingguang (屈映光; 1883–1973), Chinese politician
  - Qu Wu (屈武; 1898–1992), Chinese politician
  - Qu Bochuan (屈伯川; 1909–1997), Chinese scholar and educator in China, and principal founder of the Dalian University of Technology
  - Teresa Wat (屈潔冰; born 1949 or 1950), Canadian politician
  - Methodius Qu Ailin (屈蔼林; born 1961), Chinese Roman Catholic bishop of Roman Catholic Diocese of Hunan, China
  - Qu Dongyu (屈冬玉; born 1963), Chinese biologist who is the current Director General of the UN specialized agency Food and Agriculture Organization
  - Qu Zhongheng (屈中恆, 1967 – ?) Taiwanese actor
  - Joey Wat (屈翠容; born 1971), Chinese CEO of Yum China and KFC China
  - Sean Wat (屈坚文; born 1984), Singaporean rear admiral
  - Qu Chuxiao (屈楚萧; born 1994), Chinese actor

== See also ==
- Chinese Surnames
- Han Chinese
- Chinese version of Qu surname: zh:屈姓
