= Ji Haipeng =

- 纪海鹏
- Title: Chairman and CEO, Logan Property Holdings

Ji Haipeng (Chinese: 纪海鹏), or Kei Hoi Pang in Cantonese, is the chairman and CEO of Logan Property Holdings, a company 85% owned by his daughter, Perenna Kei, who has a net worth of US$1.3 billion.

In May 2010, Logan Property was incorporated in the Cayman Islands, with Kei as the sole shareholder. Over the following years, Kei became the majority shareholder, using various British Virgin Islands holding companies and a family trust which she started in Guernsey.

Ji is a Chinese citizen, and in China, holding in any offshore company must be declared and taxes paid on any dividends, but Kei became a Hong Kong resident in 2012, where ownership of offshore companies does not need to be declared to China and their dividends are not taxed. She is also a citizen of Saint Kitts and Nevis.

Ji lives in Shantou, in Guangdong province, and Logan Property is headquartered in Shenzhen.
