= Yingbo =

Yingbo (Chinese: 𦀚伯) was an early ruler of the ancient Chinese state that would later be known as Chu. His father was Jilian and his mother was Bi Zhui (妣隹), a granddaughter of the Shang dynasty king Pangeng. He had a younger brother named Yuanzhong (遠仲).

According to the Tsinghua Bamboo Slips, Yingbo was succeeded by Xuexiong (better known as Yuxiong). However, Sima Qian's Records of the Grand Historian recorded the name of Jilian's son as Fuju (附沮), and Xuexiong as Fuju's son. The exact relationship between Yingbo, Fuju, and Xuexiong/Yuxiong is unclear.

Yingbo House of Mi
Regnal titles
Preceded by Jilian	Ruler of Chu	Succeeded by Yuxiong
