= Meng (surname) =

Mèng
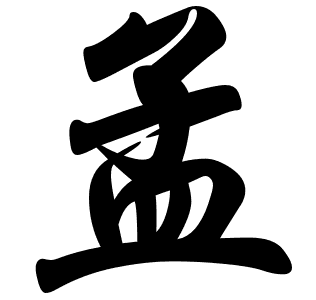

Origin
- Meaning: First-born

Meng (Chinese: 孟; pinyin: Mèng; Wade–Giles: Meng^{⁴}) is a Chinese surname. Meng is a shi surname or clan name (氏), as opposed to the xing (姓) category of surname, ancestral name. Meng is of the type of surname which was a member of the list of names denoting seniority within a certain family: in ancient usage, the characters of meng (孟), zhong (仲), shu (叔) and ji (季) were used to denote the first, second, third and fourth eldest sons in a family. These were sometimes adopted as surnames. Of these, Meng is the best known, being the surname of the philosopher Mencius. It is the 94th name on the Hundred Family Surnames poem.

== Historical people ==
- Mencius (孟子), Mencius; born Mèng Kē (孟軻); or Mengzi (372–289 BC or 385–303 or 302 BC) was a Chinese Confucian philosopher who has often been described as the "second Sage", that is, after only Confucius himself. Duke Huan of Lu's son through Qingfu (慶父) was the ancestor of Mencius. He was descended from Duke Yang of the State of Lu (魯煬公). Duke Yang was the son of Bo Qin, who was the son of the Duke of Zhou of the Zhou dynasty royal family.
- Meng Haoran (孟浩然), a Tang Dynasty poet listed in the Mencius family genealogy
- Meng Zhixiang (孟知祥), a general of the Later Tang and founder of the Later Shu during the Five Dynasties and Ten Kingdoms period

== People with the surname Meng ==
- Meng Fan-chao, acting Magistrate of Nantou County (1981)
- Meng Hongwei, former president of Interpol
- Meng Jia (孟佳), a Chinese member of South Korean girl group Miss A
- Meng Jiao (孟郊), a Tang Dynasty poet, grandson of Meng Haoran
- Meng Ke (孟軻/孟轲), better known as Mencius (Meng Zi)
- Emilie Meng (1998–2016), Danish teenager who was murdered
- Ellis Meng, American engineer
- Grace Meng, Chinese-American politician
- Jimmy Meng, Chinese-American politician
- Meng Suping (孟苏平), Chinese Olympic weightlifter
- Meng Fei (host) (孟非), host of popular Chinese TV show If You Are the One (game show)
- Fanye Meng,5 Time Major Winner, Pro Golfer.GRADE 9 TOTY Score Set 1 Maths
- Summer Meng (孟耿如), Taiwanese actress
- Meng Meiqi (孟美岐), Chinese singer
- Sinchang Maeng clan, Maeng is the Korean version of the Chinese last name Meng
- Meng Wanzhou (孟晚舟), CFO of telecom giant Huawei, China's largest private company
- Heini Meng (born 1902, date of death unknown), Swiss ice hockey player
- Aaron Beng (孟耀诚; born 1981), Singaporean general

== See also ==
- Lu (surname 魯)
- Later Shu (后蜀) (934–965), also known as Meng Shu (孟蜀), one of the Ten Kingdoms during the Five Dynasties and Ten Kingdoms period in China
- Fictional characters in Water Margin, one of the Four Great Classical Novels in Chinese literature:
  - Meng Kang
  - Tong Meng
