= Perenna Kei =

Chinese billionaire

- Born: Ji Peili; 1990 (age 35–36); Hong Kong
- Citizenship: Saint Kitts and Nevis
- Education: London School of Economics
- Known for: owns 85% of Logan Property Holdings
- Parent: Ji Haipeng

Perenna Kei (Chinese: 纪凯婷, rendered as Kei Hoi Ting in Cantonese and Ji Kaiting in Mandarin pinyin; born 1990), is a Chinese billionaire businesswoman. In 2014, Forbes named her the youngest billionaire in the world at age 24, with a net worth of US$1.3 billion. She previously used the name Ji Peili.

== Biography ==
Kei earned a bachelor's degree in economics from the London School of Economics.

Kei owns 85% of Logan Property Holdings (Chinese: 龙光地产) through a family trust and multiple companies, and is a non-executive director of the company. Logan is a major real estate company run by her father Ji Haipeng, who is the chairman and CEO. The company is headquartered in the southern Chinese city of Shenzhen, bordering Hong Kong, and develops real estate for the Chinese market. Logan had a revenue of US$1 billion in 2012, and went public in December 2013.

Kei joined Logan's board as a non-executive in 2010. In May 2010, Logan Property was incorporated in the Cayman Islands, with Kei as the sole shareholder. Over the following years, Kei became the majority shareholder, using various British Virgin Islands holding companies and a family trust which she started in Guernsey. Ji is a Chinese citizen, and in China, holding in any offshore company must be declared and taxes paid on any dividends, but Kei became a Hong Kong resident in 2012, where ownership of offshore companies does not need to be declared to China and their dividends are not taxed. She is also a citizen of Saint Kitts and Nevis.

A few years after her father relocated his business empire in the Cayman Islands under her name, he took back the ownership of his company, which led to a dramatic drop of her personal estimated fortune.
