= Mi (surname) =

Mi is the atonal Wade–Giles and pinyin romanization of various Chinese surnames. Transcribing the character 羋, it was the name of the royal house of the ancient state of Chu. It is also the transcription of the surnames 麋, 米, and 禰, along with a few other less common names.

== Mǐ (芈) ==
The surname Mǐ (羋) was originally an onomatopoeia for caprine bleating with the reconstructed Old Chinese pronunciation *meʔ. As the family name of the royal house of Chu, it was apparently used to transcribe a Kam–Tai word in the Chu dialect meaning "bear". This was then calqued into Old Chinese as 熊 (Xióng), used as the clan name of the ruling branch of the family. The Mi also ruled Kui (夔) and some Chu successor states after the fall of Qin.

As recorded by Sima Qian, the family themselves claimed descent from Zhuanxu, a son of the Yellow Emperor in Chinese legend; his grandson Jilian; and Yuxiong, a tutor of King Wen of Zhou in the 11th century BC. After the victory of the King Wu over the Shang at Muye c. 1046 BC, Yuxiong's descendants supposedly remained prominent at the Zhou court and the Cheng King (r. 1042–1021 BC) then created Xiong Yi, Yuxiong's great-grandson, the viscount of the fief of Chu.

Chinese historians and genealogists also say that various other families began as cadet branches of the Mi, apart from the royal Xiong. The Dou (鬬) and Cheng (成) were known together as the Ruo'ao clan. The descendants of particular Chu kings became known by the separate surnames Jing (景), Zhao (昭), and Qu (屈), known collectively as the Sanlü (三閭). Other lesser branches included the Ye (葉), originally known as the Shenyin (沈尹); the Xiang (項); the Lan (蘭); the Zha (查); and some members of the Pan (潘) descended from Pan Chong.

Notable people with this surname:

- Kings of Chu
- Mi Bazi (羋八子, the Queen of Qin's King Huiwen.)
- Qu Yuan (屈原, clan name Qu, author of Chu Ci)
- Xiang Yu (項羽, clan name Xiang, Chinese historical hero who was famous for his rivalry with Liu Bang)
- Duke of Ye (Prime minister of Chu during the late Spring and Autumn period. Clan name Ye, the first Ye.)
- Ban Gu, Ban Chao and Ban Jieyu (three siblings from Ruo'ao clan)

== Mǐ (米) ==
The surname Mǐ (米) is the Chinese word for "rice", particularly milled and polished rice ready for cooking. It is listed 59th in the Hundred Family Surnames and considered one of the "Nine Sogdian Surnames".

Notable people with this surname:

- Mi Fu (Chinese: 米芾 or 米黻; pinyin: Mǐ Fú, also given as Mi Fei, 1051–1107) was a Chinese painter, poet, and calligrapher born in Taiyuan during the Song dynasty

== Mí (禰) ==
The surname Mí is a variant pronunciation of nǐ (禰), originally the term for the spirit of one's own dead father and then a synonym for spirit tablets and ancestral shrines, all aspects of ancestral veneration connected to traditional conceptions of filial piety.

- Mi Heng (禰衡; 173 – 200) – Scholar in the Late Han Dynasty

== Mi (糜) ==
The surname Mí (糜) is a word for mush used in some dialects to refer to congee and similar forms of cooked rice.

Notable people with this surname:

- Mi Zhu (糜竺; died c. 221) – Official under warlord Liu Bei in the Late Han Dynasty
- Mi Fang (糜芳) General under Liu Bei then military general of Eastern Wu
- Lady Mi (麋夫人), wife of warlord Liu Bei

== See also ==
- Hundred Family Surnames
