= Xiong Yi (11th century BC) =

Xiong Yi 熊繹

Ruler of Chu
- Reign: 11th century BC
- Predecessor: Xiong Kuang
- Successor: Xiong Ai
- Issue: Xiong Ai
Names
- Ancestral name: Mǐ (羋); Lineage name: Xióng (熊); Given name: Yì (繹)
- House: Mi
- Dynasty: Chu
- Father: Xiong Kuang

Xiong Yi (Chinese: 熊繹; pinyin: Xióng Yì) was an early ruler of the Chu state who reigned in the 11th century BC. He was the first Chu monarch to become a vassal lord of the Zhou dynasty with the title of viscount.

Son of Xiong Kuang, he was traditionally ascribed descent from the Yellow Emperor and Zhuanxu through his great-grandfather Yuxiong.

== Biographical sketch ==
Xiong Yi lived at the time of King Cheng of Zhou (reigned 1042–1021 BC) who wished to honor the most loyal officials of his predecessors King Wu of Zhou and King Wen of Zhou. The king summoned a meeting with Xiong Yi and other lineageheads at Qiyang (岐陽) (northeast of modern-day Qishan County, Shaanxi Province) where Xiong Yi swore allegiance to the King and became keeper of the Maojue (茅蕝) in the order of precedence. Along with the Xianbei clan leader he was also appointed joint guardian of the ritual torch (守燎). At the same meeting, as a result of his ancestors’ loyal service to the former lords of Zhou, Xiong Yi received a grant of land around Danyang (丹阳) (modern day Xichuan County, Henan Province) where he built the first capital of Chu. He then began the arduous task of clearing the thorny undergrowth from the foothills of the Jingshan Mountains so that his people could build Chu and make sacrifices to the Zhou king. King Cheng also gave Xiong Yi the hereditary title of Zĭ (子), which in the succeeding centuries became roughly equivalent to a viscount.

At some time during Xiong Yi's reign, vassal state leaders Duke Ding of Qi, Count Kang of Wey (衛康伯), Xie, Marquis of Jin and Bo Qin, Duke of Lu met with King Kang of Zhou. The king gave each of the three vassal leaders a precious treasure without involving the Chu ruler. Later on, during the Spring and Autumn period in 530 BC, King Ling of Chu would once more raise the issue of Chu’s exclusion.

Xiong Yi was succeeded as ruler of Chu by his son Xiong Ai.

== Notes ==
1. The title keeper of the Maojue (茅蕝) refers to the bundle of reeds and coarse grass used to strain wine prior to its use as a sacrificial offering

Xiong Yi House of Mi
Regnal titles
Preceded by Xiong Kuang as Ruler of Chu	Viscount of Chu; 11th century BC	Succeeded by Xiong Ai
