= Jilian =

Jilian (Chinese: 季連; pinyin: Jìlián) was the first recorded ruler of the ancient Chinese state that was later known as Chu. He adopted the clan name Mi (芈) and was the founder of the House of Mi that ruled Chu for over eight centuries.

== Ancestry ==
According to legends recorded in the Records of the Grand Historian by Sima Qian, Jilian descended from the mythical Yellow Emperor and his grandson and successor Zhuanxu. Zhuanxu's great-grandson Wuhui(吳回) was put in charge of fire by Emperor Ku and given the title Zhurong. Wuhui's son Luzhong (陸終) had six sons, all born by Caesarian section. Jilian was the youngest of the six.

== Family ==
According to the Tsinghua Bamboo Slips, Jilian married Bi Zhui (妣隹), a granddaughter of the Shang dynasty king Pan Geng. They had two sons: Yingbo and Yuanzhong (遠仲). However, the Records of the Grand Historian recorded the name of Jilian's son as Fuju (附沮).

Jilian House of Mi
Regnal titles
New title	Ruler of Chu	Succeeded by Yingbo
