= Hu Zongnan =

Republic of China and Taiwanese general (1896–1962)

- 胡宗南
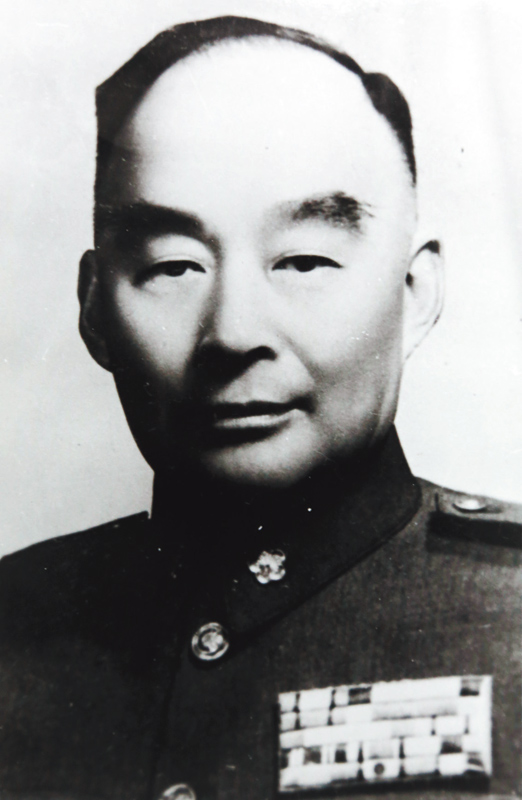
- General Hu Zongnan
- Born: 16 May 1896; Zhenhai, Zhejiang, Qing Empire
- Died: 14 February 1962 (aged 65); Taipei, Taiwan
- Burial place: Yangmingshan, Taipei
- Military career
- Allegiance: Republic of China
- Service years: 1924–1959
- Rank: Captain, June 1926; Brigadier general, November 1927; Major general, 1930; Lieutenant general, 1936; General, 1947
- Nickname: Eagle of the Northwest
- Unit: First Corps
- Commands: 2nd Regiment, 1st Div, July 1926; 1st Division, First Army, May 1927; 22nd Division, November 1927; 2nd Brigade, 1st Division, April 1928; 1st Division (reorg.), 1930; First Army, April 1936; Seventeenth Army, 1938; 34th Army Group, 1938; 8th Military Region, 1940; 1st Military Region, 1944
- Conflicts: Northern Expedition; Chiang-Gui War; Chiang-Feng-Yan War; Chinese Civil War (1935–1951); Second Sino-Japanese War; Battle of Shanghai; Battle of Wuhan; First Taiwan Strait Crisis
- Awards: Order of Blue Sky and White Sun, Order of Cloud and Banner
- Other work: Governor of Zhejiang Province

Hu Zongnan (Chinese: 胡宗南; pinyin: Hú Zōngnán; Wade–Giles: Hu Tsung-nan; 16 May 1896 – 14 February 1962), courtesy name Shoushan (壽山), was a Chinese general in the National Revolutionary Army and then the Republic of China Army. Together with Chen Cheng and Tang Enbo, Hu, a native of Zhenhai, Ningbo, formed the triumvirate of Chiang Kai-shek's most trusted generals during the Second Sino-Japanese War. After the retreat of the Nationalists to Taiwan in 1949, he also served as the President's military strategy advisor until his death in 1962.

== Campaigns against warlords ==
Hu was in the first graduating class of Whampoa Military Academy (1924). One of Chiang Kai-shek's favourite students, he took part in the Northern Expedition as commander of the 2nd Regiment, 1st Division, First Army. In May 1927 he was promoted to deputy commander of 1st Division while retaining command of 2nd Regiment. In November of the same year he was assigned as commander of the 22nd Division and led the division during the second Northern Expedition in April 1928. In August his division was downsized to the 2nd Brigade of 1st Division, and he served as commander of this brigade which Chiang thought highly of. In 1929 and 1930 he led his brigade in the Central Plains War to defend the central government against the regional warlords such as the Gui clique, Feng Yuxiang and Yan Xishan. He was promoted and given command of a reorganised 1st Division upon his return.

He participated in Chiang's communist extermination campaigns, was given command of First Army in 1936, and took part in the Battle of Shanghai and Wuhan, variously leading the Seventeenth Army, 34th Army Group, 8th Military Region and 1st Military Region.

== Resumption of the Chinese Civil War ==
After World War II, Hu Zongnan battled the Chinese Communist Party and in the early stage of the struggle, was successful in taking Yan'an, the capital of the communist base in Shaanxi. Communist forces under Peng Dehuai inflicted numerous defeats on Hu's forces which greatly reduced Hu's strength.

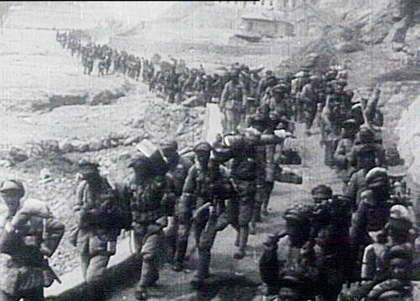
Hu Zongnan's army advance toward Yan'an

The rugged terrain of the northwestern China favored the communists defenders and their guerrilla warfare and not suitable for the mechanized nationalist troops, a large number of which was needed to defend the newly captured regions. During Hu Zongnan's initial success, he was able to overrun the communists' base in Shaanxi and forced the communists to evacuate most of their governmental bodies to the east of the Yellow River, the nationalist troops were dangerously overstretched in guarding the newly conquered regions and spread thin. Hu Zongnan was aided by Ma Clique Muslim cavalry when seizing Yan'an.

The American Time magazine claimed Hu beat his chest like Tarzan when he was frustrated or angry. In March 1948, at Ichuan Peng Dehuai led Communist forces to launch a surprise attack against Hu Zongnan's forces, inflicting 20,000 casualties upon them, and drove all the way with 60,000 soldiers into southern Shaanxi province to reach Sichuan, General Hu requested immediate help from Muslim Governor Ma Hongkui, who sent two Muslim cavalry divisions. They defeated the Communist forces at Pao-chi and inflicted 20,000 dead upon the Communists, expelling them into Gansu.

In 1949 the entire Kuomintang defences were falling apart. Ma Hongkui sent a telegram to Li Zongren to submit his resignation from all positions he held, then Ma Hongkui fled to Taiwan, and his cousin Ma Hongbin took charge of his positions. In March 1950 Hu retreated to Taiwan as well.

== Later career ==
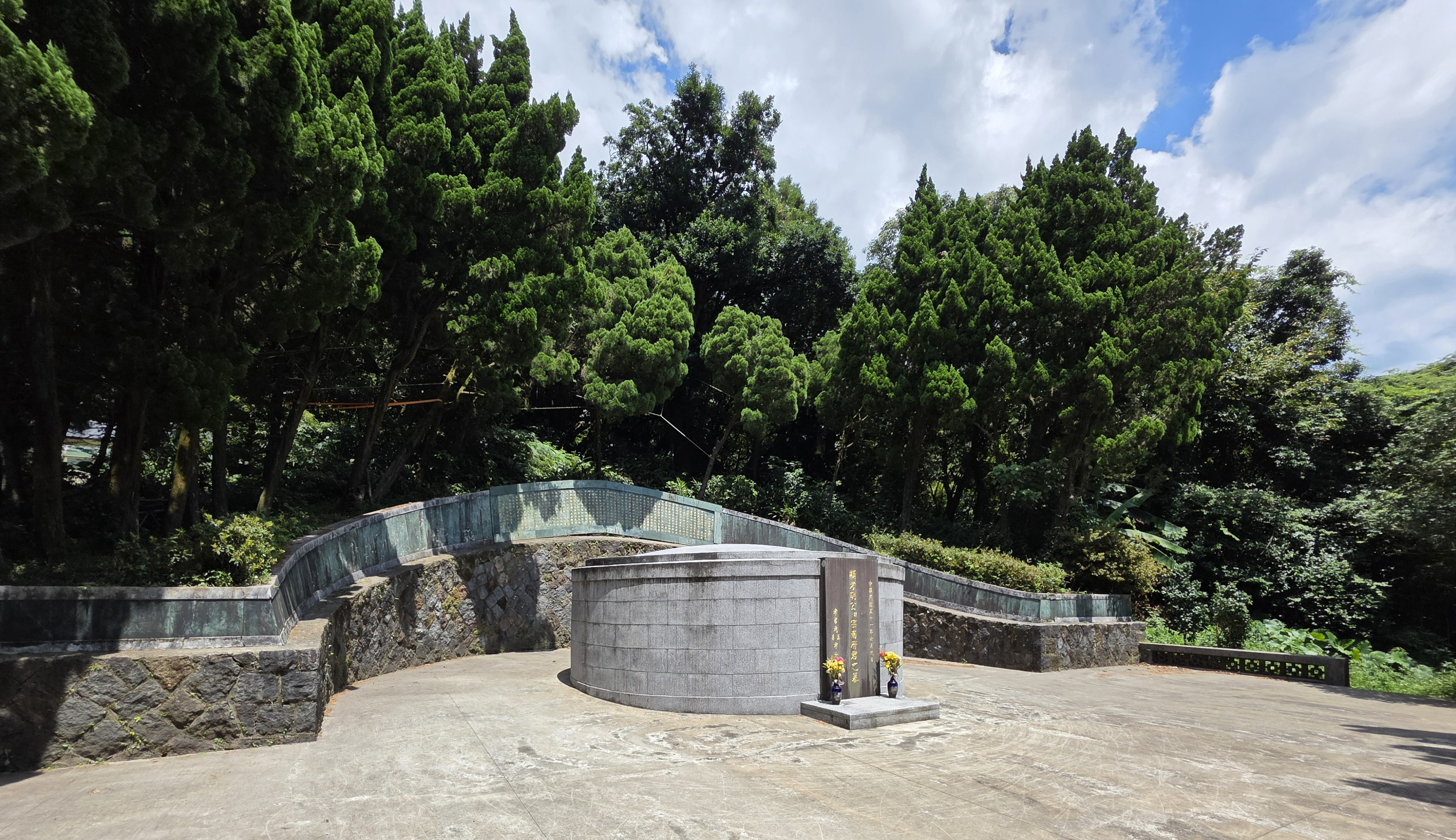
Hu Zongnan's Tomb in Yangmingshan, Taipei.

After the KMT fled to Taiwan, he served as governor of Zhejiang (Chekiang) from 1952, commanded the ROC defense in the First Taiwan Strait Crisis and retired from the army in 1955. He went on to serve as the President's military strategy advisor until his death on 14 February 1962.

== Legacy and assessment ==
In August 2014, the Commercial Press (商務印書館) published two volumes commemorating General Hu Zongnan: A Legendary General: Hu Zongnan (一代名將胡宗南) and Chronicles of General Hu Zongnan (胡宗南上將年譜). Former Vice President Lien Chan and Hu’s son, Hu Wei-chen, a former Secretary-General of National Security Council, attended the launch ceremony. Lien emphasized that his father, Lien Chen-tung, had been a close friend of Hu since the Second Sino-Japanese War, and that their families continued to maintain contact after relocating to Taiwan. Hu Weichen noted that the revised edition of the Chronicles incorporated entries from Hu’s personal diaries, recollections from his subordinates, and excerpts from Chiang Kai-shek’s diaries, and expressed hope for future expanded editions as more historical materials become available.

Hu Weichen also outlined several areas for future scholarly research on Hu Zongnan's life and military career (In the original news report, Weichen had already organized his expectations and demands into five distinct points.) :

1. Japanese perspectives: During the Second Sino-Japanese War, Japanese media reported that Hu’s units were among the most formidable opponents of the Imperial Japanese Army. Hu Weichen suggested that contemporary Japanese historians' evaluations of Hu’s military leadership warrant further investigation. He also recalled anecdotes involving Japanese Prime Minister Eisaku Satō and Hu’s wife, Dr. Ye Xiazhi, including a historical gift of a Yamaha concert grand piano to a school.
2. Military education and leadership: Hu placed significant emphasis on the training and moral development of his troops. Following the Republic of China government’s retreat to Taiwan, Hu was tasked with reorganizing the army, navy, and air force to enhance loyalty, morale, and combat readiness. Researchers are encouraged to examine the scope and impact of his contributions to military modernization.
3. Operational challenges in Northwest China: Hu faced a complex strategic environment, simultaneously defending against Japanese forces to the east, Communist forces to the north, and the Soviet Union to the west, while also attempting to maintain local governance and cohesion. Hu’s efforts to establish anti-Communist defensive zones were at times obstructed by local authorities, leading to setbacks in operational planning. Communist forces reportedly celebrated these difficulties, perceiving them as more advantageous than a conventional battlefield victory. In several instances, Hu’s forces identified main Communist units and were prepared to launch offensives but were forced to withdraw due to insufficient logistical support. Hu’s son highlighted that such incidents contributed to external misunderstandings of Hu’s leadership, including the moniker "King of the Northwest" (西北王), which underscores the need for further scholarly clarification of his historical role.
4. Recognition of fallen soldiers: The books also provide biographies of numerous soldiers under Hu’s command who were killed in action or committed suicide while encircled by enemy forces. These accounts illustrate the ethos and morale of Hu’s troops, which Hu Weichen emphasized as deserving of detailed academic examination.
5. Strategic vision and aspirations: Until his death in 1962, Hu reportedly maintained ambitions for a future campaign to reclaim mainland China. Hu Weichen suggested that research into Hu’s long-term strategic vision, as well as Taiwan’s role in the broader context of Chinese national development, would provide valuable insights into mid-20th-century Chinese military history.
