= Paeng =

Paeng may refer to:

- Paeng, a Filipino nickname for Rafael
- Paeng, a Korean surname originating from the Chinese surname Peng
- Paeng, Laotian dried fermentation starter
- Paeng, flour in Thai cuisine
- Typhoon Paeng, name for multiple Western Pacific typhoons

== People ==
- Paeng Nepomuceno (born 1957), Filipino bowler
- Paeng, a nickname for Rafael Hechanova, Filipino basketball player
- Paeng, a nickname for Rafael M. Salas, Filipino businessman
- Paeng, a nickname for Rafael Buenaventura, Filipino businessman
- Ka Paeng, nickname for Rafael V. Mariano, Filipino politician

=== Characters ===
- Paeng, a character in the Filipino series The Greatest Love
- Paeng, a character in the comedy horror film Shake, Rattle and Roll IX
- Miss Paeng, a character in the South Korean drama film Heartbreak Library

== See also ==
- Pang (disambiguation)
- Peng (disambiguation)
- Ping (disambiguation)
