= Marina Garden Ferry Pier =

Pier in Hong Kong

Coordinates: 22.3731°N 113.9711°E

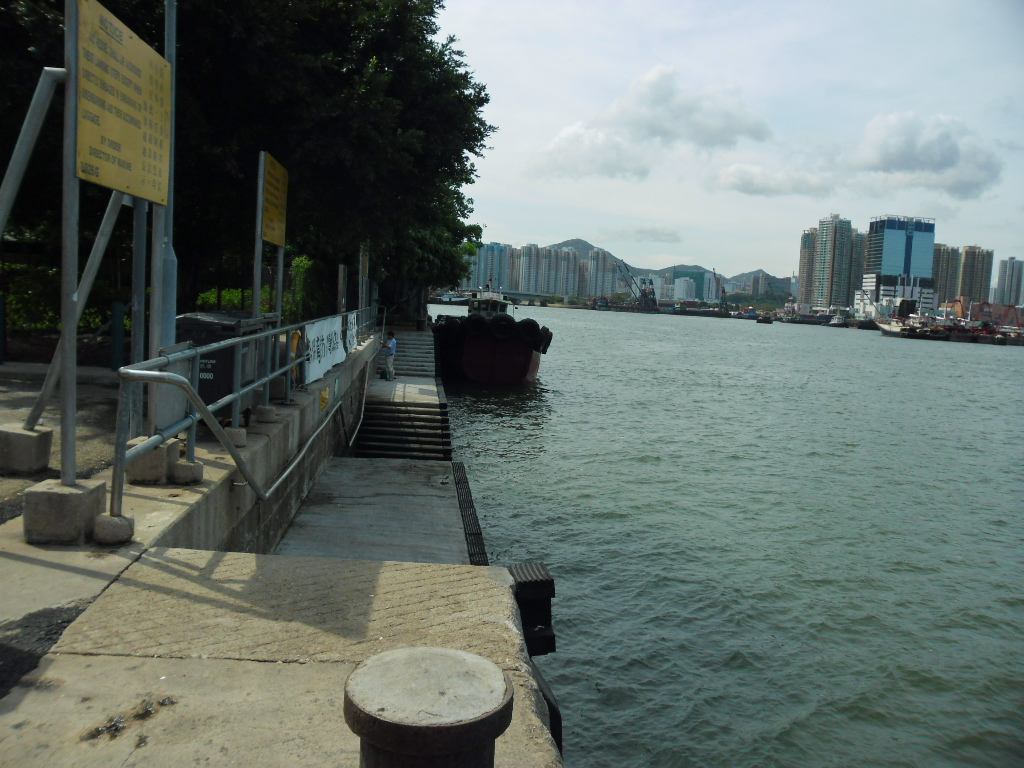
Marina Garden Ferry Pier

Marina Garden Ferry Pier (Chinese: 慧豐園碼頭) was a ferry pier outside Marina Garden (Chinese: 慧豐園) in Tuen Mun south, New Territories, Hong Kong. It is located close to Tuen Mun Ferry Pier and Light Rail Tuen Mun Ferry Pier stop. It provided one ferry route to Tung Chung, Sha Lo Wan and Tai O on Lantau Island, which is operated by Fortune Ferry Company (富裕小輪公司), but the pier was relocated to nearby Tuen Mun Ferry Pier in 2009.

According to HKSAR Government official categorization, the pier is known as Tuen Mun Area 44 Landing.
