= Peng =

Peng may refer to:

- Peng (surname) (彭), a Chinese name
- Peng (state) (大彭), a state during the late Shang dynasty
- Peng (mythology) (鵬), a legendary Chinese creature
- Peng (spider), a genus of spiders in the family Corinnidae
- Peng!, 1992 album by Stereolab
- PENG!, a 2005 comic
- P.Eng., abbreviation for the Professional Engineer certification title
- Peng Collective, an art activist group combining investigative journalism, campaigning and theatre
- PenG, an antibiotic
- Peng (or Pengzhen), a town in Shuangliu district, Chengdu city, Sichuan province, China

== See also ==
- Pang (disambiguation)
- Pong (disambiguation)
- Ping (disambiguation)
- Penge, London
