= Fu Shan =

Hill on Lantau Island, Hong Kong

- 虎山
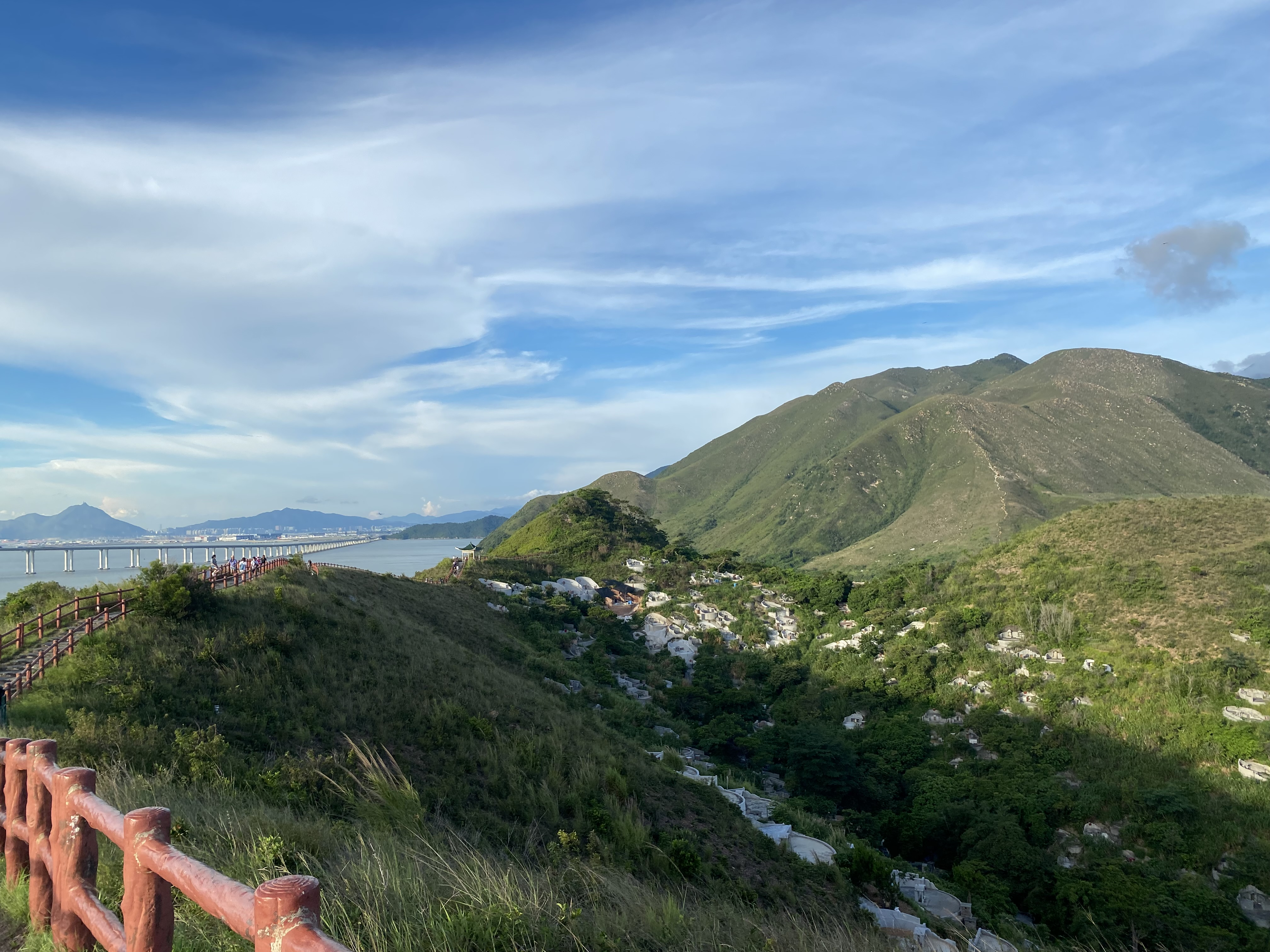
- View from Fu Shan's Summit

Highest point
- Elevation: 75 m (246 ft)
- Coordinates: 22.2593°N 113.8572°E

Geography
- Location within Hong Kong
- Location: Northern Lantau Island, Hong Kong

Fu Shan (Chinese: 虎山) is a small hill in Hong Kong. It is situated on Lantau Island north of Tai O and stands at a height of 75 metres (246 ft) above sea level. It is notable for a trail on its ridge that allows one to view the threatened Chinese white dolphins species jumping from the water into the air.

== Access ==
Fu Shan is only accessible by foot. It can be approached in a few different ways. One way of reaching the summit is to make a sharp right after going past Tai O Heritage Hotel at the western end of Shek Tsai Po Street and follow the signage along the way.

== See also ==
- List of mountains, peaks and hills in Hong Kong
- Lantau Peak
