= Poong =

Poong may refer to:

- Poong (surname; Korean: 풍, 馮;), a Korean surname, a variant of Pung; see List of Korean surnames
- Kim Poong (Korean: 김정환; born 1978), South Korean webtoon artist
- Poong language, a.k.a. Pong, a dialect of Cuoi
- Tay Poong language, variously, the Tho languages
- Poong, the Joseon Psychiatrist, a 2022 South Korean television series

== See also ==
- Pong (disambiguation)
