= Apang =

Apang may refer to:

== People ==
- Gegong Apang, Indian politician
- Minam Apang, an artist recognized by the New Museum in New York City in 2012, see List of New Museum Triennial Artists
- Omak Apang, Indian politician
- Ona Apang (botanical abbreviation: Apang), a published botanist, see List of botanists by author abbreviation (A)
- Otu Apang, a student leader, a 2016-2017 executive of the Students' Union of Rajiv Gandhi Government Polytechnic (SURGGP), Itanagar

== Places ==
- Apang, Alilem, Ilocos Sur, Ilocos, Luzon, Philippines; a barangay (barrio), see List of barangays in Ilocos Sur
- Apang Palace (University of Cambridge spelling), the imperial palace of the Qin dynasty in Xian, the palace of the First Emperor of China

== Other uses ==
- Apang, a traditional alcoholic beverage of India found in Assam
- Apang Mitra, organization

== See also ==
- Pang (disambiguation)
