= Pang =

Pang may refer to:

== Places ==
- Siem Pang District, Cambodia
- Pangnirtung or Pang, an Inuit hamlet on Baffin Island, Canada
- Fo Pang (Chinese: 火棚), an area of Kowloon, Hong Kong
- Pang, a hamlet in Leh district, Jammu and Kashmir, India
- Pang, Malappuram, a village in Malappuram, Kerala, India
- Pang, Parbat, Nepal
- Pang, Rolpa, Nepal
- Pang Mapha district, Mae Hong Son Province, Thailand
- Pang Sila Thong district, Kamphaeng Phet Province, Thailand
- River Pang, located in southern England

== People ==
=== Surname ===
- Pang (surname)
- an alternative form of the romanization of Peng (surname) (彭)
- Pang brothers (born 1965), Danny and Oxide, filmmakers

=== Given name ===
- Pang Ding-hong, Chinese name of Chris Patten (born 1944), last Governor of Hong Kong
- Pang Juan (龐涓, died 342 BC), military general from the Warring States period
- Pang Tong (龐統, 179–214), strategist and advisor from the late Han dynasty

=== Pseudonyms and nicknames ===
- Pang, nickname for Issei Sagawa (born 1949), Japanese man who killed and cannibalized a woman
- Korena Pang, pseudonym used by Jeff Mangum (born 1970)
- Madame Pang, nickname for Nualphan Lamsam (born 1966), Thai businesswoman and manager of the Thailand women's national football team

== Arts, entertainment and media ==
=== Music ===
- Pang (album), a 2019 album by Caroline Polachek
- Pang! (album), a 2019 album by Gruff Rhys
- Pangs (band), an American electropunk band
- Pangs, a 2017 album by Alasdair Roberts
- Swish cymbal, also called a pang cymbal, a percussion instrument

=== Other uses in arts, entertainment and media ===
- Pang Wanchun, fictional character from Water Margin
- Pang (video game), a video game also known as Buster Bros.
- "Pangs", a TV episode of Buffy the Vampire Slayer
- Pang! (podcast), a 2017 play and 2019 podcast about food insecurity

== Other uses ==
- Pang uk (Cantonese: 棚屋), shack house
- Porte-Avions de Nouvelle Génération (PA-NG)

== See also ==
- Pennsylvania Air National Guard (PA ANG)
