= Leung Uk =

Village in Lantau Island, Hong Kong

Coordinates: 22.248168°N 113.865267°E

Leung Uk (Chinese: 梁屋) is a village in Tai O, on Lantau Island, Hong Kong.

== Administration ==
Leung Uk is a recognized village under the New Territories Small House Policy.

== History ==
Leung Uk was probably first settled around 1800 by members of the Leung (梁) family (hence the name of the village), who were Hakkas. According to genealogical records, the first ancestor came to Tai O from a village near Shum Chun Market (today's Shenzhen). At the time of the 1911 census, Leung Uk had a population of 104.

During the Japanese occupation of Hong Kong, all villagers of Leung Uk were twice paraded en masse by Japanese troops, and were subsequently able to survive.

In 1955, Austin Coates described the village as having a population of 96, of the Leung, Chow, Man and Sin surnames. The village economy involved farming: vegetables, pigs and grass-cutting for sale to Shek Tsai Po for breaming.
