= Peng (surname) =

- Pronunciation: Péng (Mandarin); Pang (Cantonese); Phàng (Hakka); Phêⁿ, Phîⁿ (Hokkien)
- Language: Chinese, Indonesian, Vietnamese, Korean

Origin
- Language: Old Chinese
- Origin: China
- Derivation: Peng Zu
- Meaning: drum beats

Other names
- Variant forms: Peng (Mandarin); Pang, Phang (Cantonese, Hakka); Peh (Teochew); Phi, Phe, Phee (Hokkien); Bành (Vietnamese); Pangestu (Indonesian)

Peng (Chinese: 彭; pinyin: Péng; alternative forms of romanization include Pang and Phang (Cantonese, Hakka), Pangestu or Pangestoe (Indonesian), and Bành (Vietnamese)) is a common Chinese family name, ranking 35th most common in 2006. It is the 47th name on the Hundred Family Surnames poem.

== Etymology ==
The character (彭) is composed of 壴 (zhǔ meaning "drum") and a pictograph (shān representing "beats"). More commonly used as a surname, this character is also an adjective, meaning "big".

== Origin ==
The surname Peng (彭) is traced to the legend of Peng Zu, God of Longevity, who legend tells lived 800 years. During the Shang dynasty, Jian Keng, a descendant of Zhuanxu, was granted the feudal territory Dapeng (Great Peng), and later adopted the name, Peng Zu.

== Distribution ==
In 2019 it was the 31st most common surname in mainland China.

Of the top 30 cities in China, 彭 ranked 9th most common in the city of Changsha.

== Korean surname ==
The same surname character is also found in Korea, where it is pronounced Paeng (Korean: 팽). According to South Korea's 2000 census, 2,825 people in 918 households had this surname. There are two major clan lineages for this surname, each with a different bon-gwan (seat of a clan lineage, not necessarily the actual residence of clan members). The more common one, Jeolgang Paeng (1,578 people in 515 households), claims descent from Paeng U-deok (彭友德), who came from Zhejiang (pronounced Jeolgang in Sino-Korean reading), China to the Korean peninsula during the reign of King Seonjo of Joseon (r. 1567–1608). The less common one, Yonggang Paeng clan (795 people in 259 households), claims descent from Paeng Jeok (彭逖), who came from Jinling, China to the Korean peninsula in the retinue of Princess Noguk during the reign of King Chungjeong of Goryeo (r. 1348–1351). Yonggang (Ryonggang) is located in an area that became part of North Korea after the division of Korea.

== Notable people ==
- Adrian Pang (彭耀顺; born 1966), Singaporean Chinese actor
- Diana Pang (彭丹; born 1972), Hong Kong dancer and actress
- Eddie Peng Yu-Yan (彭于晏), Canadian-Taiwanese actor
- Jacqueline Pang (彭晴; born 1974), Hong Kong radio announcer and author
- Pang Siew Fum (彭秀芳), Malaysian drug trafficker serving life imprisonment in Singapore
- Peng Bo (彭勃), Olympic diving medalist
- Peng Chang-kuei(彭長貴), Taiwanese chef
- Peng Cheng-min (彭政閔), Taiwanese baseball player
- Peng Chong, a former Chinese politburo member
- Peng Dehuai (彭德怀), the Chinese Communist Party military leader, Marshal of the People's Republic of China.
- Peng Fai-nan (彭淮南), Governor of the Central Bank of the Republic of China (1998–2018)
- Peng Jiamu (彭加木; 1925–1980), Chinese biochemist and explorer of Lop Nor
- Peng Jianqing (彭劍青), Chinese actress active as Wang Hanlun
- Peng Jiasheng (彭家聲), leader of the Myanmar National Democratic Alliance Army
- Peng Lei (彭蕾), Chinese business executive at Alibaba Group
- Peng Lifa (彭立发; born 1974), Chinese physicist and democracy activist
- Peng Liyuan (彭丽媛), Wife of Chinese Paramount leader Xi Jinping, public figure in her own right.
- Peng Ming-min (彭明敏), Taiwan independence activist, DPP politician and first opposition candidate in a Taiwan presidential election
- Peng Pai (彭湃), a pioneer of the Chinese agrarian movement and peasants' rights activist
- Peng Peiyun (彭珮云; 1929–2025), Chinese politician
- Peng Qi, fictional character from the 14th century novel, Water Margin
- Peng Sheng-chu, Director-General of the National Security Bureau of the Republic of China
- Peng Shige (彭实戈), Chinese mathematician
- Peng Shilu (彭士禄), the "father of China's nuclear submarines" and the "father of China's naval nuclear propulsion", as the first chief designer of China's nuclear submarines
- Peng Shuai (彭帅), professional tennis player
- Peng Wan-ru (彭婉如), Taiwanese politician and feminist
- Peng Xiaoran (彭小苒), Chinese actress
- Peng Xiuwen (彭修文), conductor and composer
- Peng Yang (彭羕), Han dynasty official who served Liu Bei
- Peng Yanhui, Chinese gay rights activist
- Peng Yuchang (彭昱暢), Chinese actor
- Peng Zhen (彭真), a leading member of the Chinese Communist Party
- Pong Cheng-sheng (彭振聲), Deputy Mayor of Taipei
- Prajogo Pangestu (彭雲鵬), Indonesian tycoon
- Stella Pang (彭慧芝), Hong Kong engineer
- The Pang Brothers (born 1955), Hong Kong, twin brothers Danny Pang Fat (彭發) and Oxide Pang Chun (彭順), screenwriters and film directors
- Xander Pang (彭佳显), Singaporean actor
- Yiliang "Doublelift" Peng, a professional League of Legends player for Team Liquid

== See also ==
- List of common Chinese surnames
- Pang (surname)
- Penck (surname)
- Five Great Clans of the New Territories
- Fanling Wai
