= Penck =

Penck is a surname. Notable people with the surname include:

- A. R. Penck (1939–2017), German painter, sculptor and printmaker
- Albrecht Penck (1858–1945), German geographer and geologist
- Walther Penck (1888–1923), German geomorphologist, son of Albrecht

== See also ==
- Peng (surname)
- Pang (surname)
