= Tho language =

Thổ may refer to different languages in Vietnam:

- Cuối language
- Tày language
- Khmer language
