= Stella Pang =

Hong Kong engineer

- 彭慧芝
- Education: Brown University (BS); Princeton University (MS, PhD)
- Known for: Contributions to nanofabrication technology
- Scientific career
- Fields: Engineer
- Workplaces: University of Michigan; City University of Hong Kong

Stella W. Pang (Chinese: 彭慧芝) is an engineer known for her work on microfabrication, biomaterials, nanostructures, microelectromechanical systems, and microfluidics. She is Chair Professor of Electrical Engineering at the City University of Hong Kong, Director of the Centre for Biosystems, Neuroscience, and Nanotechnology, and was the Head of the Department of Electrical Engineering.

== Education and career ==
Pang graduated from Brown University in 1977 with a Bachelor of Science in electrical and computer engineering. She went to Princeton University for graduate study in electrical engineering and computer science, earning a Master of Science in 1978 and completing her Ph.D. in 1981.

From 1981 to 1989 she was a researcher at the MIT Lincoln Laboratory. In 1990 she returned to academia as a professor of electrical engineering and computer science at the University of Michigan, and in 2012 she took her present position as Chair Professor at the City University of Hong Kong. She became department head in 2016.

== Recognition ==
Pang was named a Fellow of the IEEE in 1999, "for identification and removal of process-induced damage in Si and compound semiconductor devices, and advancing the science of nanofabrication technology". She is also a Fellow of the American Vacuum Society, of the Electrochemical Society, and of The Hong Kong Institution of Engineers.
