= Pang uk =

Kind of stilt house built on water

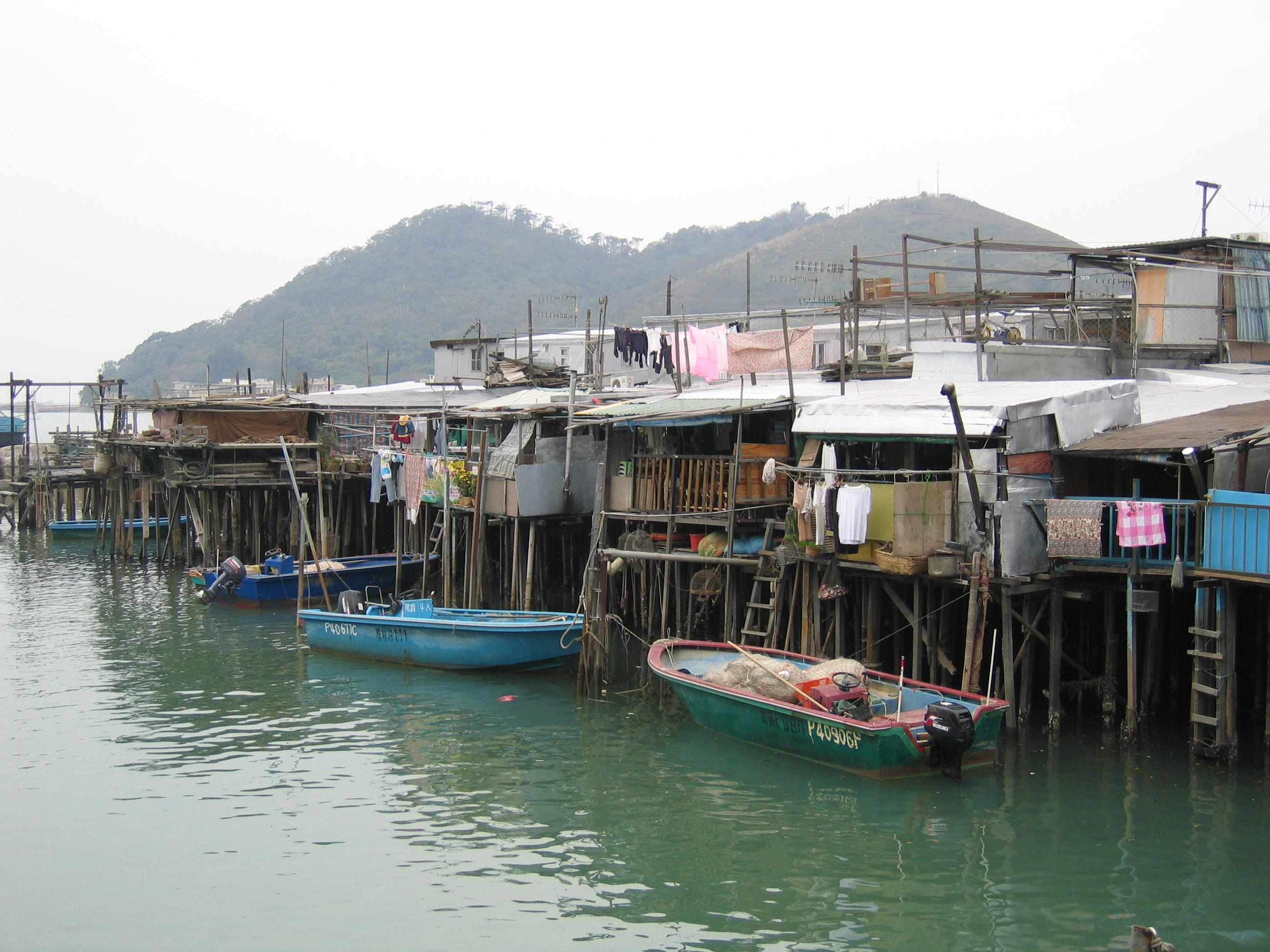
Pang uk in Tai O

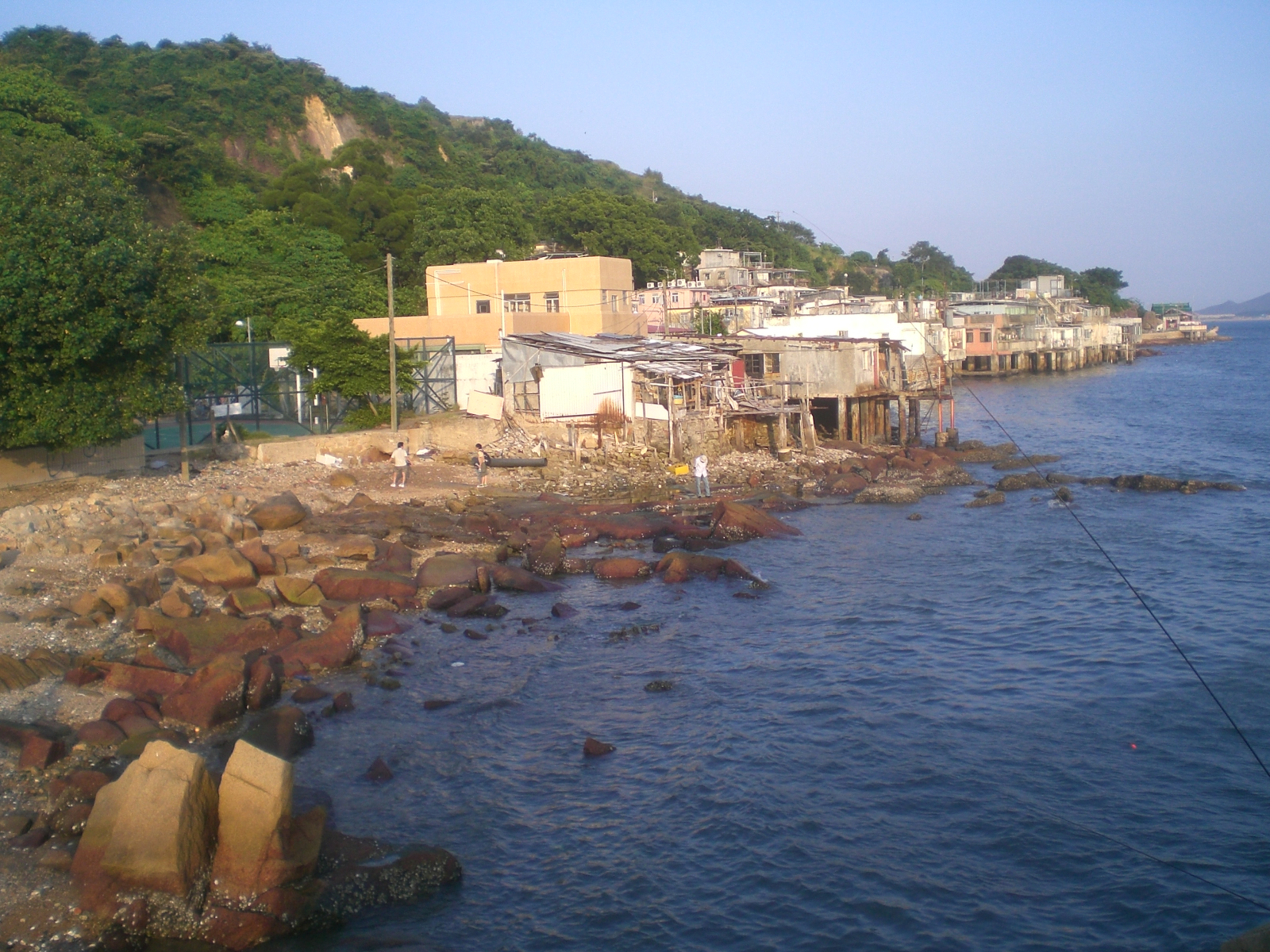
Pang uk in Lei Yue Mun.

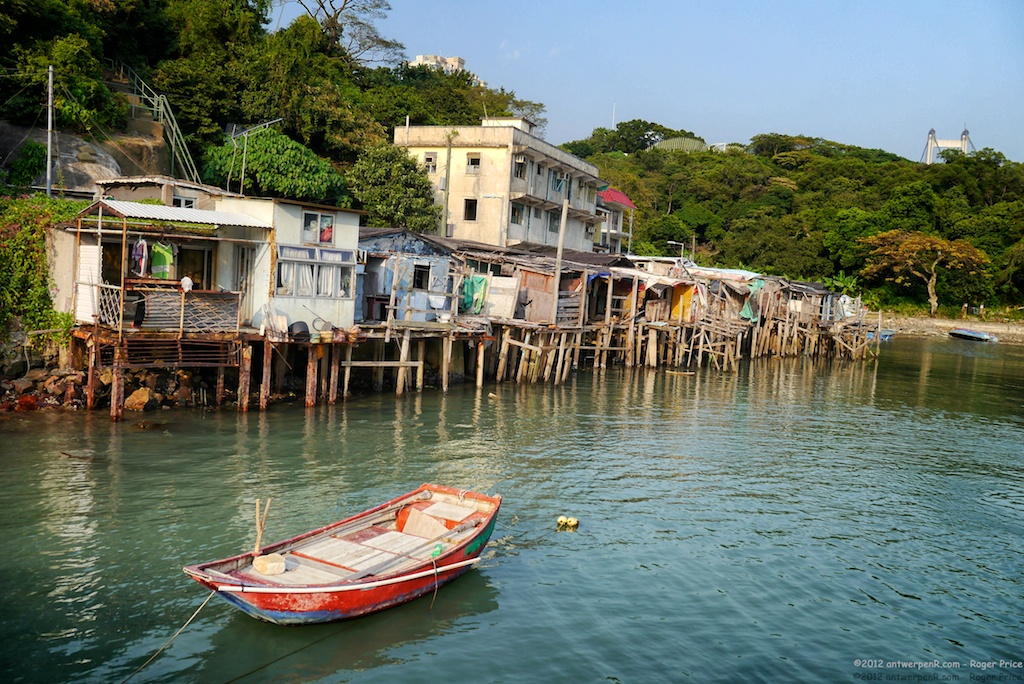
Pang uk in Ma Wan

Pang uk (Chinese: 棚屋; Jyutping: paang4 uk1; lit. 'shack house') is a kind of stilt house found in Tai O, Lantau Island, Hong Kong. Pang uk are built on water or on small beaches.

A fire broke out in 2000 destroying some of the houses in Tai O, and some were later rebuilt.

They were once found in many other fishing towns and villages in rural Hong Kong, but only those in Tai O are preserved in a large scale, with some in the Lei Yue Mun Village and Ma San Tsuen in Lei Yue Mun. Pang uk developed from the boat houses of Tanka (蜑家) or fishing people, after they moved to reside on land.

== See also ==
- Housing in Hong Kong
