= Peng Yanhui =

Chinese LGBTQ rights activist

Peng Yanhui (Yanzi, born c. 1983) is a Chinese LGBTQ rights activist.

Peng grew up near Guangzhou and enrolled in university in Guangzhou in 2002, where he says he learned about homosexuality for the first time.

In 2013, Peng quit his job and founded LGBTQ Rights Advocacy China. He became well known in 2014 after suing a private psychiatric hospital in Chongqing where he checked in underneath the pseudonym Yang Teng to investigate claims that it was using electroshock therapy to allegedly cure gay people. After he received such treatment, he won the case, receiving $500 compensation for suffering caused. The clinic was ordered to remove all adverts promoting conversion therapy from its sites.

As of 2022, Peng was a visiting scholar at the Paul Tsai China Center of the Yale Law School.
