= Pang (surname) =

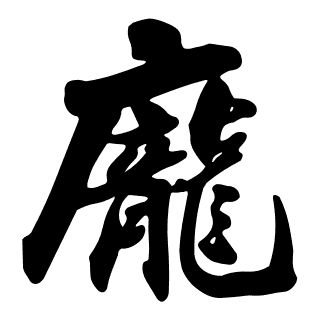
- Pronunciation: Páng (Mandarin) Pong (Hong Kong) Bàng (Vietnamese)

Origin
- Origin: China
- Region of origin: China

Pang (simplified Chinese: 庞; traditional Chinese: 龐; pinyin: Páng) is a Chinese surname. It is romanized Pong in Cantonese. In Vietnam, this surname is written in Quốc Ngữ as Bàng. "Pang" is also the Cantonese romanization of another Chinese surname Peng (Chinese: 彭; pinyin: Péng).

== Notable people with surnamed Pang (龐) ==
Persons with surname "Pang" (龐) include:

- Pang Bingxun (龐炳勛; Wade–Giles: Pang Ping-hsun (1879–1963), military general during the Second Sino-Japanese War
- Pang De (龐德; died 219), general serving under various warlords in the late Eastern Han dynasty
- Ethan Pang (born 2015), English chess player
- Pang Juan (龐涓; died 342 BC), military general from the Warring States Period
- Pang Yun Jushi (龐蘊居士; 740–808), Zen Buddhist
- May Pang (龐鳳儀, born 1950), American personal assistant and production coordinator for John Lennon and Yoko Ono
- Pang Wanchun (龐萬春), fictional character in the novel Water Margin
- Pang Tong (龐統; 179–214), adviser to the Eastern Han dynasty warlord Liu Bei
- Pang Xi (龐羲), official serving under the Eastern Han dynasty warlord Liu Zhang
- Pang Shigu (died 897), general serving under the warlord Zhu Wen
- Pang Chien-kuo (龐建國; 1953–2022), Taiwanese politician

== See also ==
- List of common Chinese surnames
- 龐 Wiktionary
- Peng (surname)
- Penck (surname)
