= Fortune Ferry =

Hong Kong ferry operator

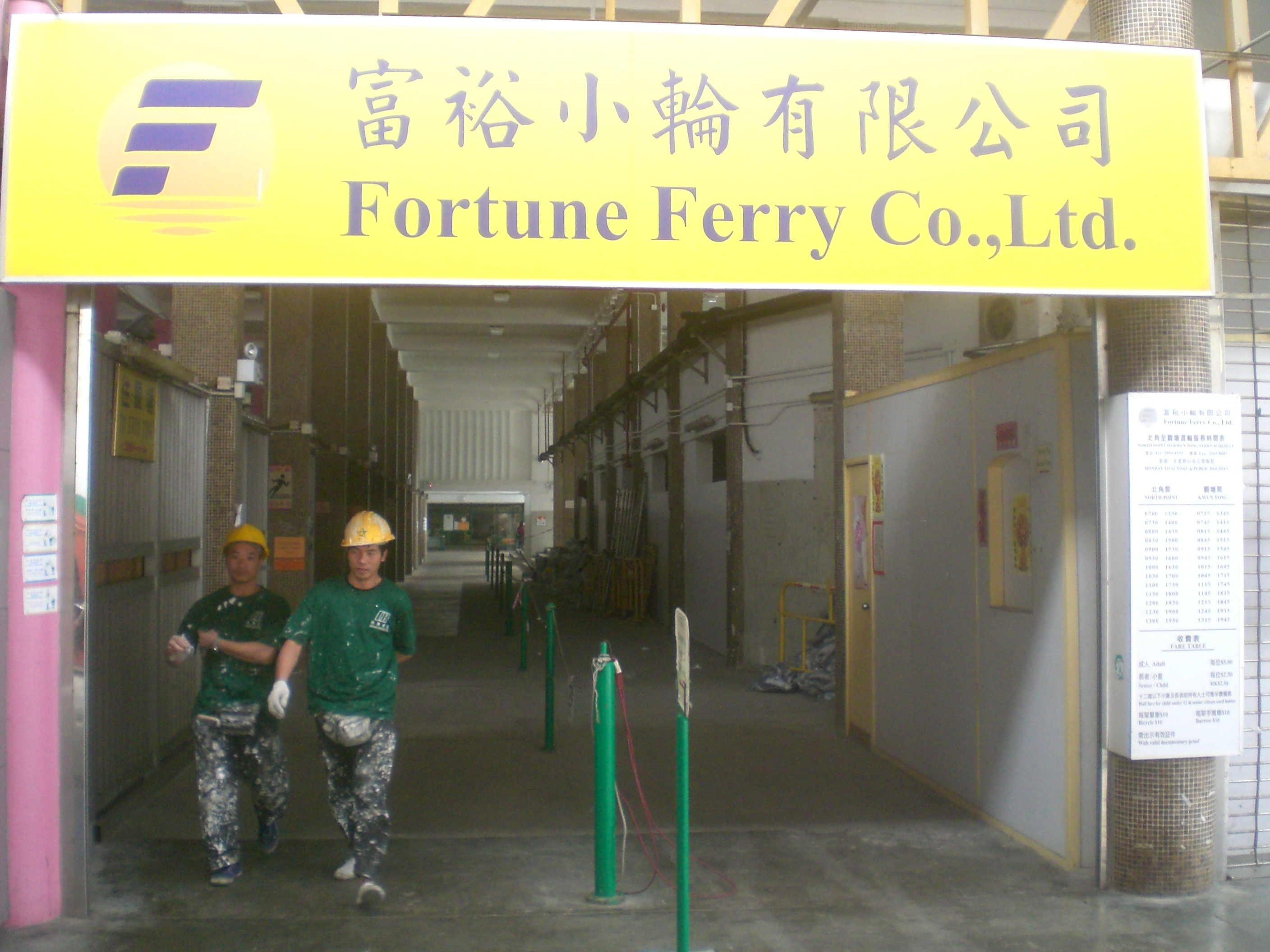
Fortune Ferry's North Point Ferry Pier entrance.

Fortune Ferry Company Ltd, more commonly known as Fortune Ferry (Chinese: 富裕小輪), is a ferry operator in Hong Kong. It is based in North Point.

== Routes ==
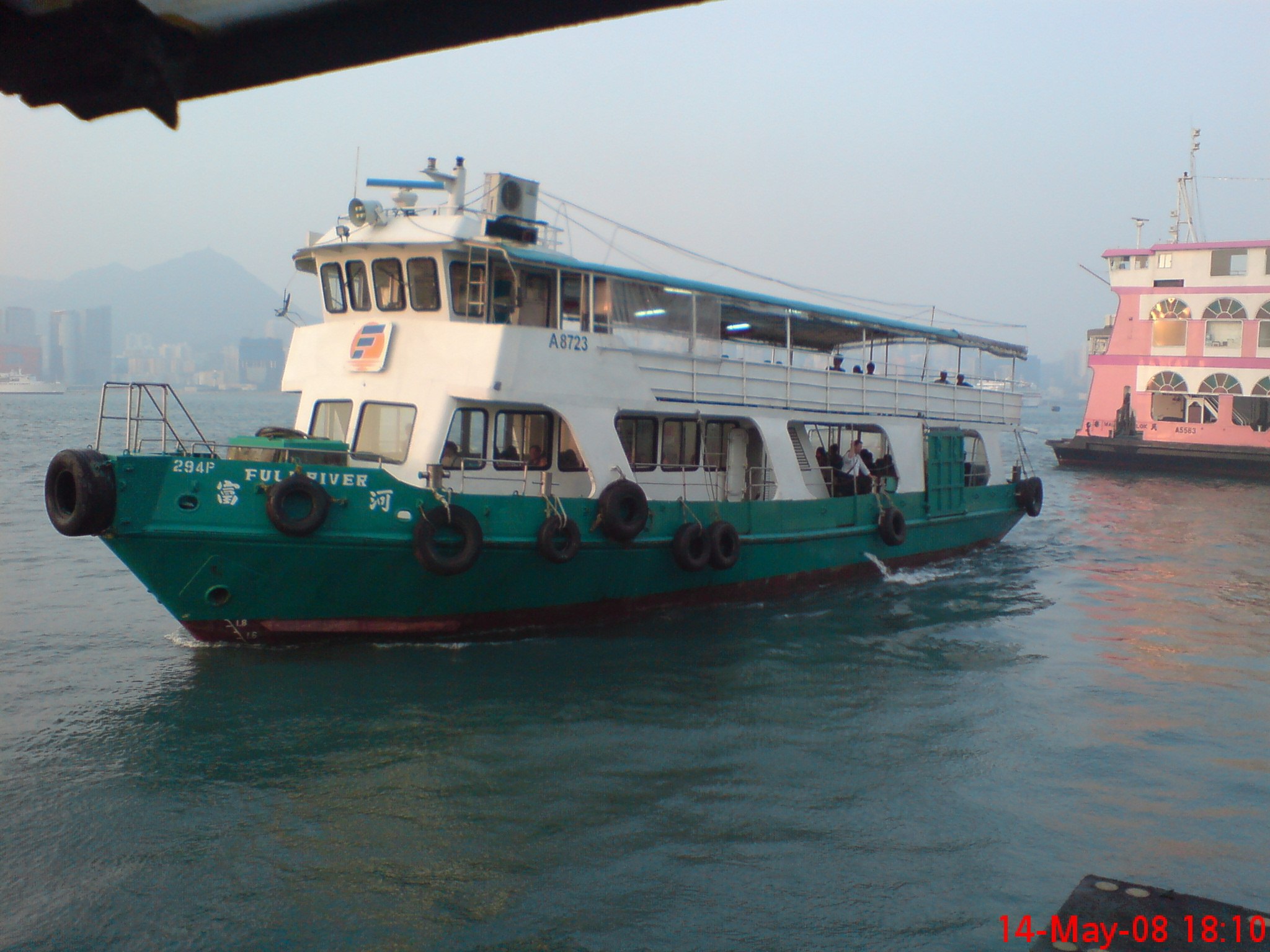
M.V. Full River, the kai-to for the service between Kwun Tong and North Point.

The company operates the following ferry routes:

- Tuen Mun to Tung Chung, Sha Lo Wan, and Tai O
- North Point to Kwun Tong and Kai Tak
- Central to Hung Hom
- Hong Kong Water Taxi Service

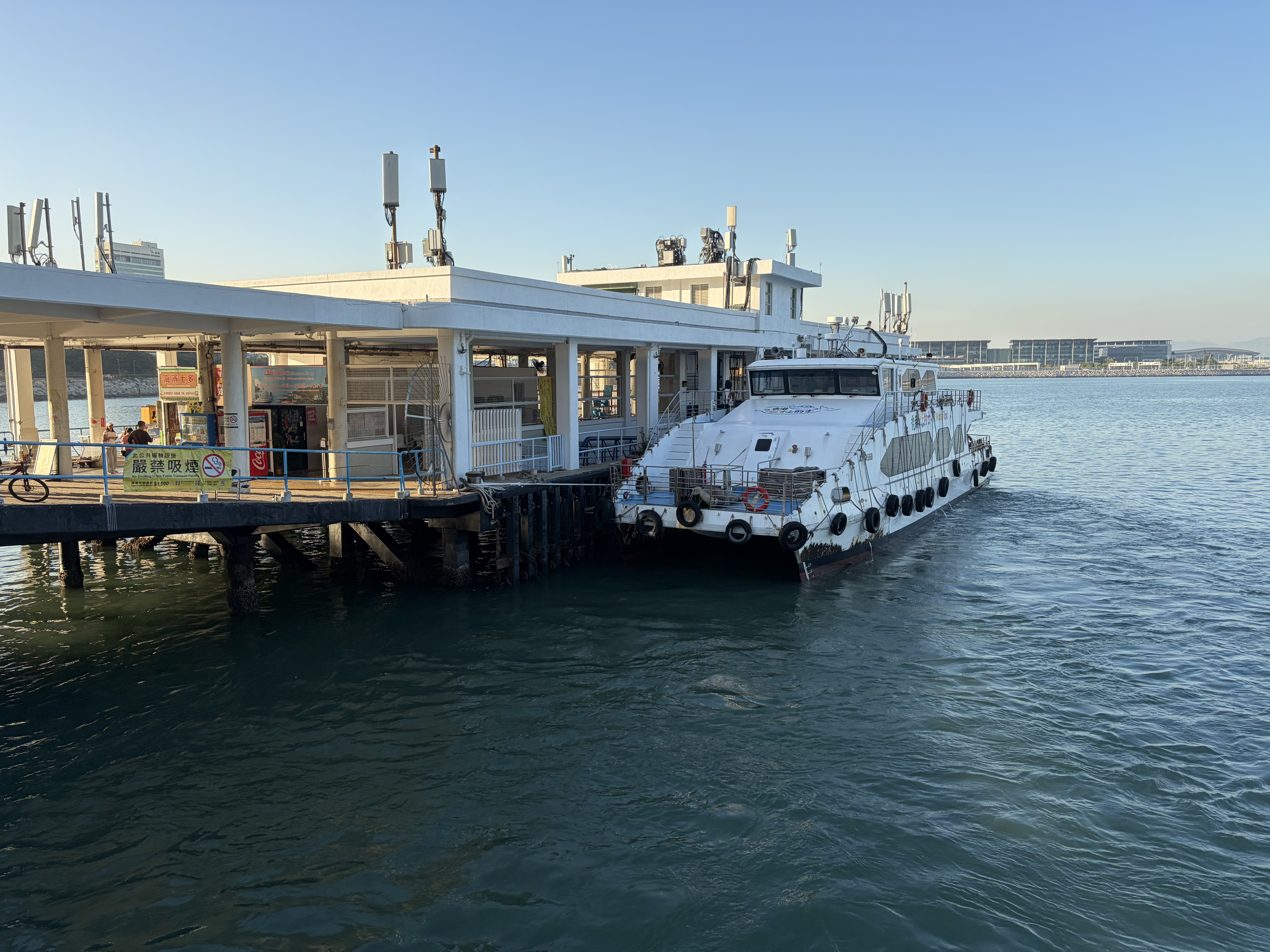
Picture of HK Water Taxi fleet on the Tuen Mun-Tung Chung route of Fortune Ferry

== Fleet ==
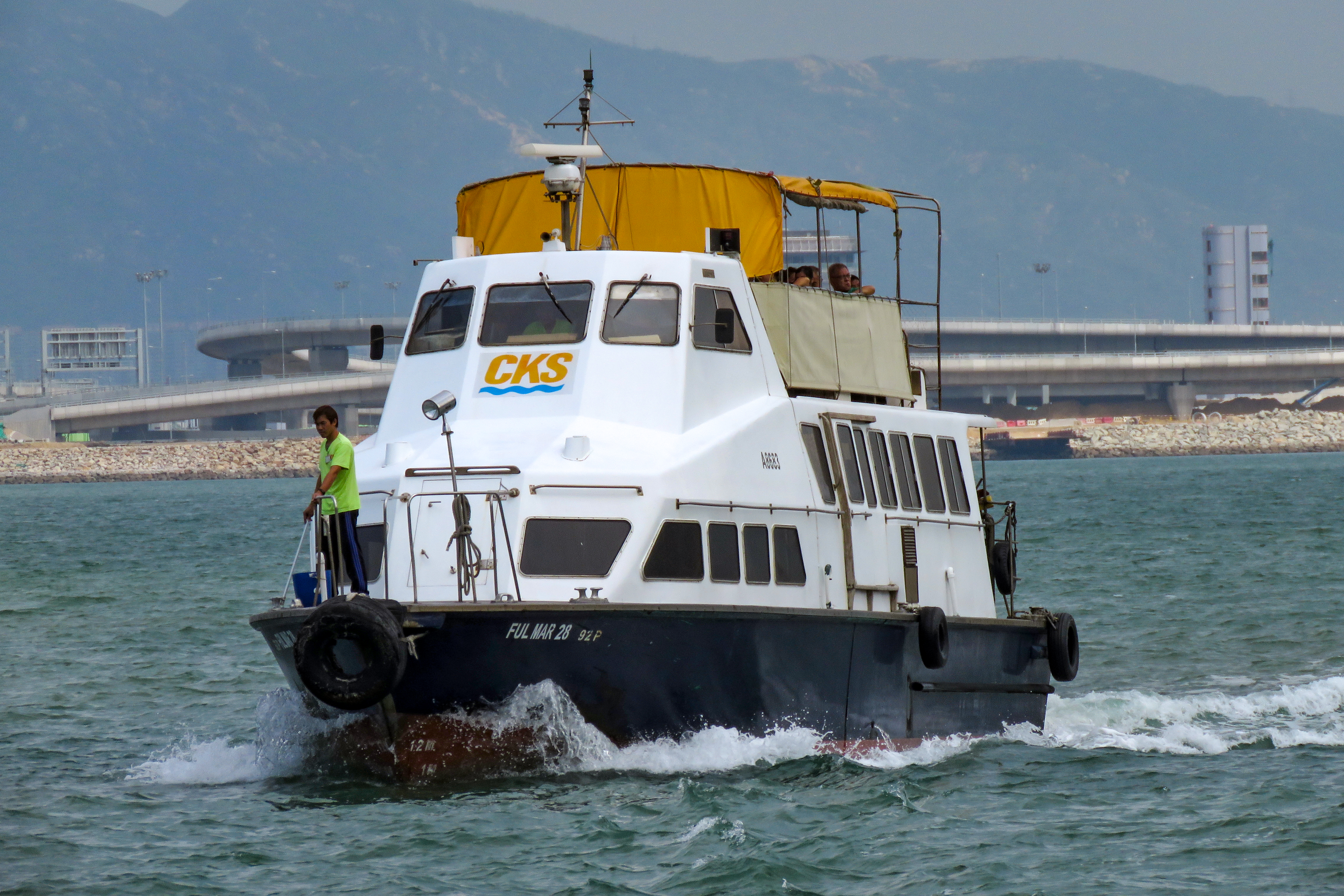
M.V. Ful Mar 28 entering Tung Chung

Name	Type	Reg	Year built	Builder	Seats	Notes
Ming Way (明威)		A6073	1992	Zhongzhan People's Joint shipyard (中山市民眾聯合船廠)	169	
Plenty River (裕河)		A8983	1995	Zhuhai Xiangzhou Shipyard (珠海香州船廠)		
Full River (富河)		A8723	1995	Zhuhai Shipyard (珠海船廠)	294	
Fortune (富裕)		A143023	2017	Jianglong Shipyard	208	
Hey (喜利)		A8163	1995	Zhuhai Xiangzhou Shipyard (珠海香州船廠)		
Jick Kee (積記)		A7873		香港製單層小型木電船		
King Dragon 1 (景龍 1)				Cheoy Lee Shipyards Ltd, Hong Kong		
Ful Mar 28		A8683	1995	Cheoy Lee Shipyards Ltd, Hong Kong		Formerly King Dragon 3 (景龍 3)
Sing Wai 28 (聲威 28)				Hin Lee (Zhuhai) Shipyard Co Ltd (珠海顯利造船有限公司)		
Bon Moon 12 (博滿 12)						
Luen Yin 8 (聯盈 8)		A10273	2003			

== See also ==
- Star Ferry
- Hong Kong & Kowloon Ferry
- Tuen Mun Ferry Pier
