= Old Tai O Police Station =

Coordinates: 22.25322°N 113.853686°E

- 舊大澳警署
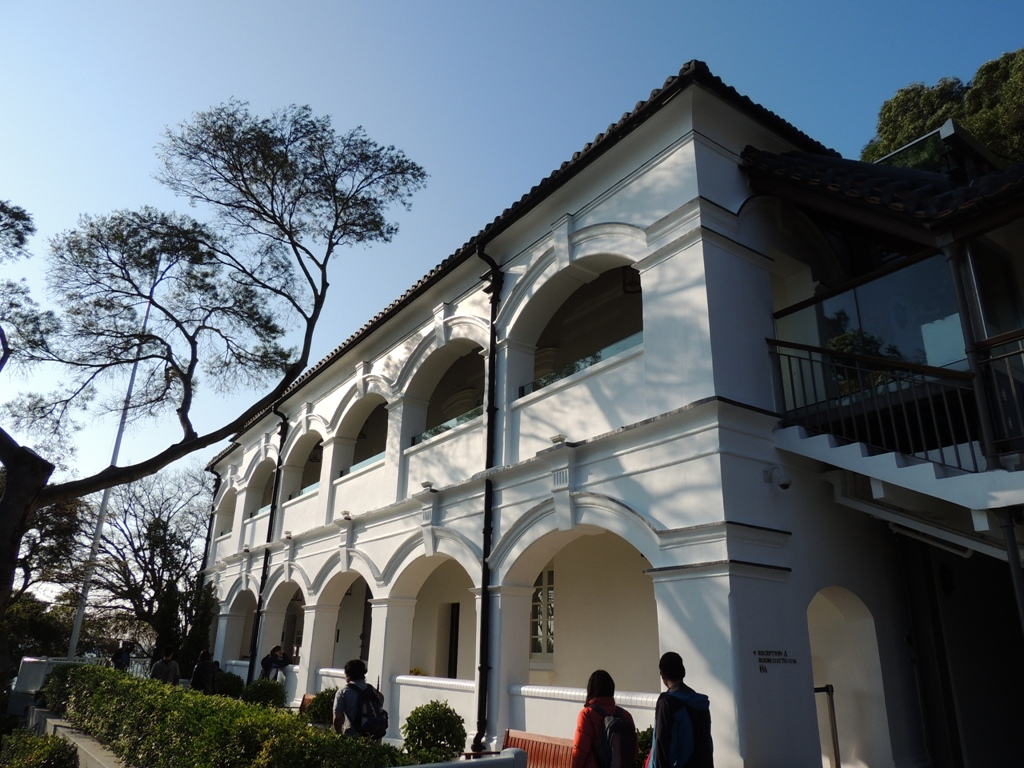
- Old Tai O Police Station in 2013.
- Interactive map of the Old Tai O Police Station area

General information
- Type: Police station
- Current tenants: Tai O Cultural Relics Hotel
- Completed: 1902
- Closed: 2002

Technical details
- Floor count: 2
- Floor area: 1,000 square metres (11,000 sq ft)

Design and construction
- Designations

Hong Kong Graded Building – Grade II
- Designated: 17 May 2010
- Reference no.: 440

Old Tai O Police Station
- Traditional Chinese: 舊大澳警署
- Simplified Chinese: 旧大澳警署
Transcriptions
Standard Mandarin
- Hanyu Pinyin: Jiù Dàào Jǐngshǔ
Yue: Cantonese
- Yale Romanization: Gauh daaih ou gíng chyúh
- Jyutping: Gau6 daai6 ou3 ging2 cyu5

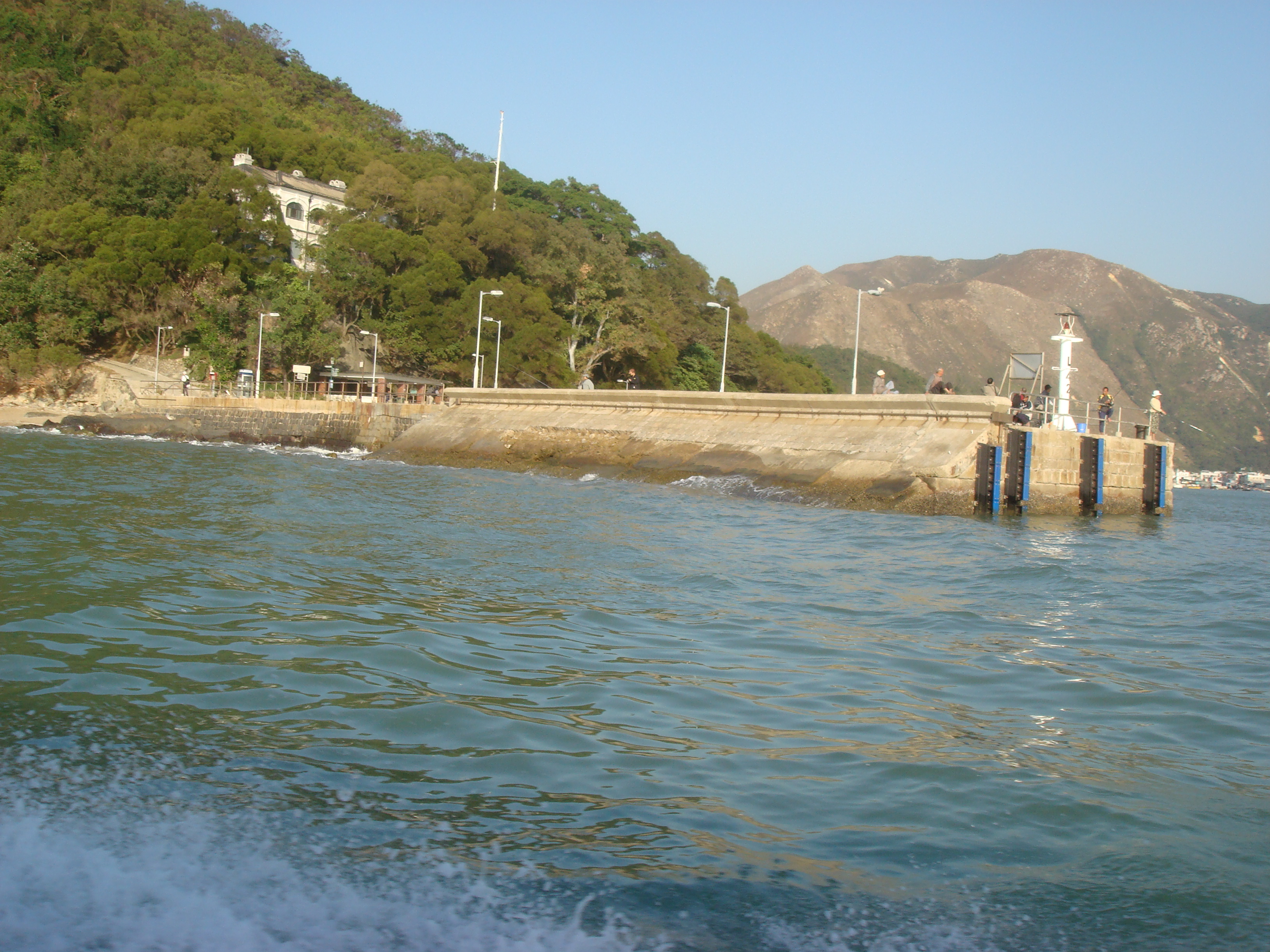
The Old Tai O Police Station is visible on the hill, overlooking Shek Tsai Po Ferry Pier (Tai O Public Pier).

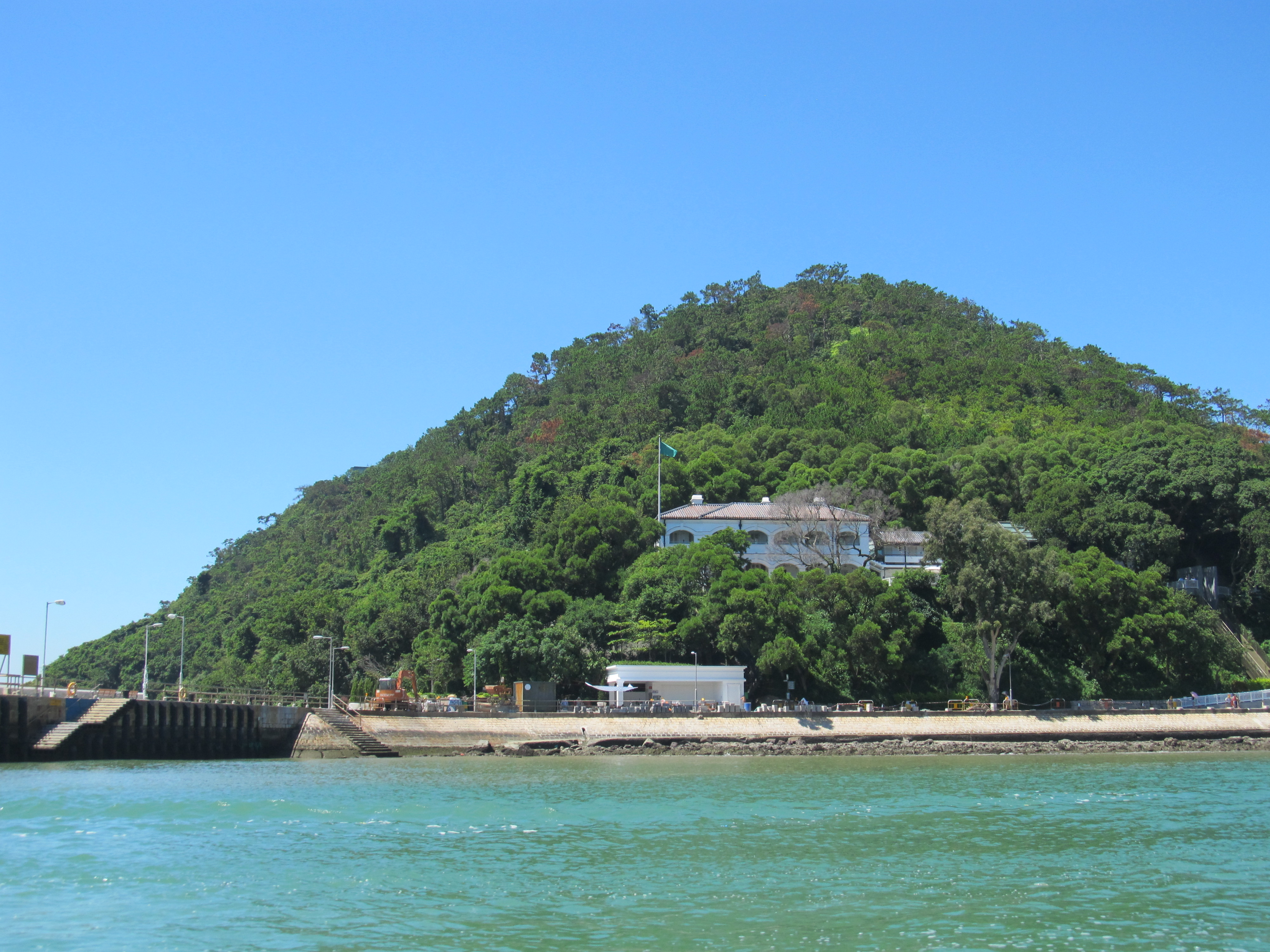
Distant view of the Old Tai O Police Station.

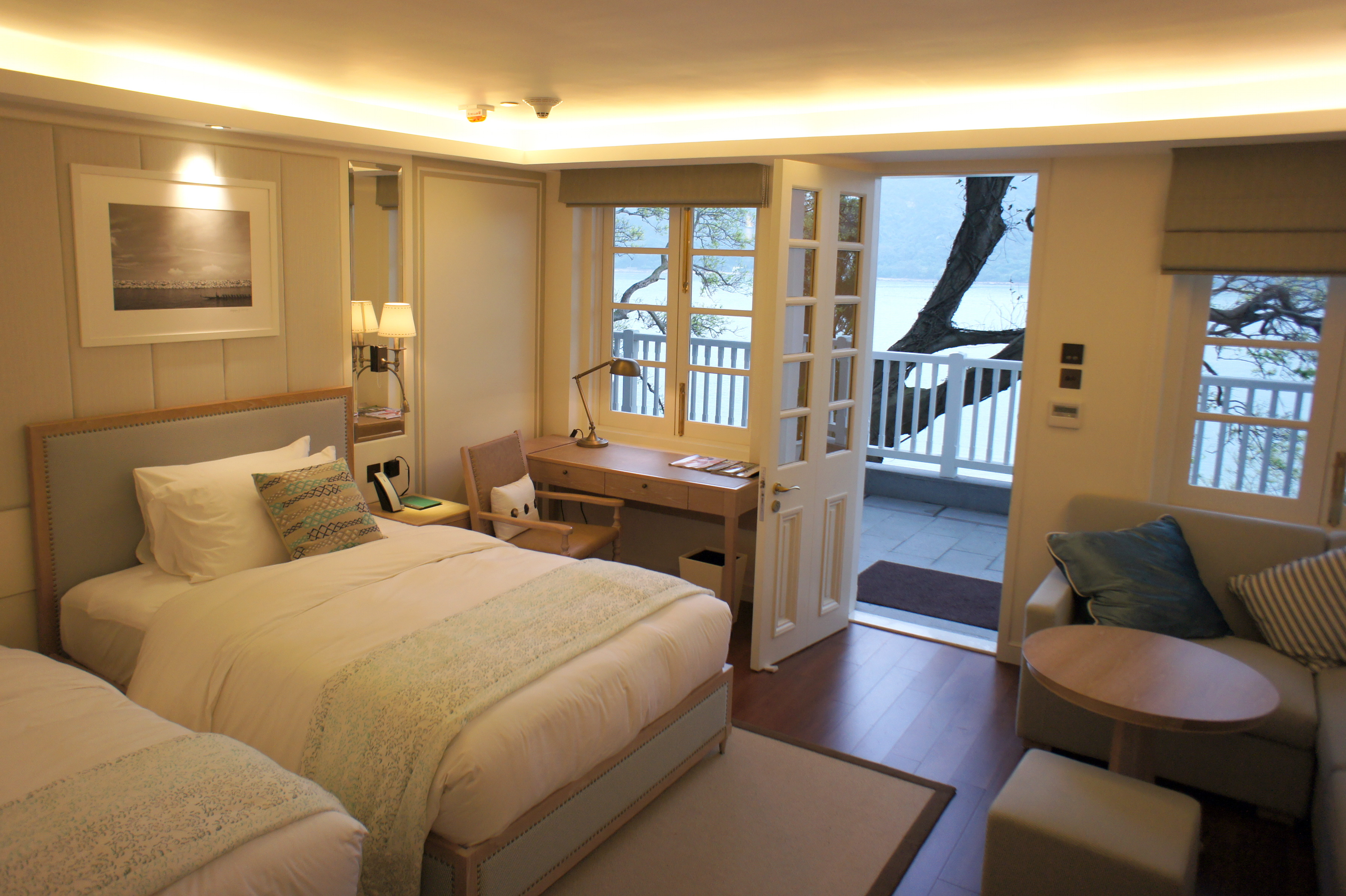
Room in Tai O Heritage Hotel.

The Old Tai O Police Station is a former police station in Hong Kong. It is located on the small hill next to Tai O Ferry Pier, at the south-western tip of Tai O, which can be considered the most westerly point within Hong Kong.

The Tai O Cultural Relics Hotel operates in a social enterprise mode, with over half of the staff being Tai O or Lantau residents.

== History ==
Tai O had long been seen as a strategic harbour area in the Hong Kong region. On 4 August 1855, British naval forces from the China Station defeated a pirate fleet at the Battle of Ty-ho Bay. The police station was built in 1902 with a main duty of combating piracy and smuggling prevalent in the neighbouring waters.

On 17 July 1918, Police Sergeant Thomas Cecil Glendinning was shot to death by Constable Teja Singh in the Charge Room of the police station where Sergeant Glendinning and his family were residing. The murder occurred following a hostage situation where Constable Singh had taken Sergeant Glendinning hostage at the station along with his wife and child. The incident was resolved after police located Constable Singh who had fled the scene and took his own life.

In 1940, Detective Constable Hing Ip of the Tai O station was shot and killed by robbers while on duty at Tai O.

During the Japanese occupation of Hong Kong, local resistance forces and triad members led by Wong Kei-tsai began a smuggling operation in the area bringing food and salt to Lantau from Mainland China. The Tai O Police Station was briefly captured by local guerrilla forces before being retaken by the Japanese Army.

The number of policemen stationed there increased from an initial six or seven to over 180 in 1983. The station was downgraded to a patrol post in 1996, and was left vacant in 2002.

Higher on the same hill are the Tai O Barracks of the PLA Hong Kong Garrison, formerly known before the handover as Naval Coastal Observation Station, Tai O.

== Architecture ==
The police station consists of two 2-storey blocks: a main block and an outhouse block linked by a footbridge at first floor level. The outhouse block has Arts and Crafts architectural features.

== Conservation ==
The Old Tai O Police Station was listed as a Grade III historic building in 1988, and as a Grade II historic building in 2009. In 2008, it was included among the seven buildings in Batch I of the Hong Kong Government's Revitalising Historic Buildings Through Partnership Scheme seeking adaptive reuse of government-owned historic buildings.

In the end, the government accepted the redevelopment proposal of the Hong Kong Heritage Conservation Foundation to convert the building into a boutique hotel. The HKHCF was initially set up under the name Nice Brilliant Limited in December 2007, and changed its name in March 2008. The HKHCF has close ties to Robert Ng's Sino Group, and two of his children sit on its board. Legislator Fernando Cheung accused them of being a "one-man NGO" set up for business purposes rather than social service. The conversion project is planned for completion at the end of 2011, with an estimated cost of HK$64.9 million.

The Old Tai O Police Station was transformed into the boutique, nine-room Tai O Heritage Hotel, and is curated and managed by the HKHCF.

== See also ==
- Robert Ng, for debated issues about the Hong Kong Heritage Conservation Foundation Ltd.
- Historic police station buildings in Hong Kong
