= Pong (disambiguation) =

Pong is a 1972 video game created by video game pioneer Al Alcorn.

Pong may also refer to:

- Pong, a 1992 platformer video game for Atari 8-bit computers, published by Mirage Software
- Pong District, a district in Phayao Province, Thailand
- Kingdom of Pong, an ancient Shan kingdom
- Ban Pong (commune) or Pong, a commune in Cambodia, or a village in the commune
- Pong language
- Pong, a response to a ping in a ping-pong scheme
- Pong, a set of three identical tiles in mahjong

== People with the surname ==
- James Pong (1911–1988), Hong Kong Episcopalian bishop
- Pong Son-hwa (born 1993), North Korean footballer

== See also ==
- Beer pong, a drinking game
- Ping pong or table tennis
- Poong (disambiguation)
