= Jeolgang Paeng clan =

Korean clan from Zhejiang, China

- Country: Korea
- Current region: Zhejiang
- Founder: Paeng U deok

Jeolgang Paeng clan (Korean: 절강 팽씨; Hanja: 浙江 彭氏) is a clan. Their bon-gwan is in Zhejiang, China. According to the research in 2000, the number of Jeolgang Paeng clan was 1578. Their founder was Paeng U deok. He was a general in Ming dynasty who was dispatched to Joseon as reinforcements from Ming dynasty during Japanese invasions of Korea. He made a lot of achievements as well as his son, Paeng Sin go (Hanja: 彭信古). After that, he was naturalized to Joseon with Paeng Sin go (Hanja: 彭信古).

== See also ==
- Korean clan names of foreign origin
