= Sha Lo Wan =

Bay in Hong Kong

Coordinates: 22°17′26″N 113°54′05″E

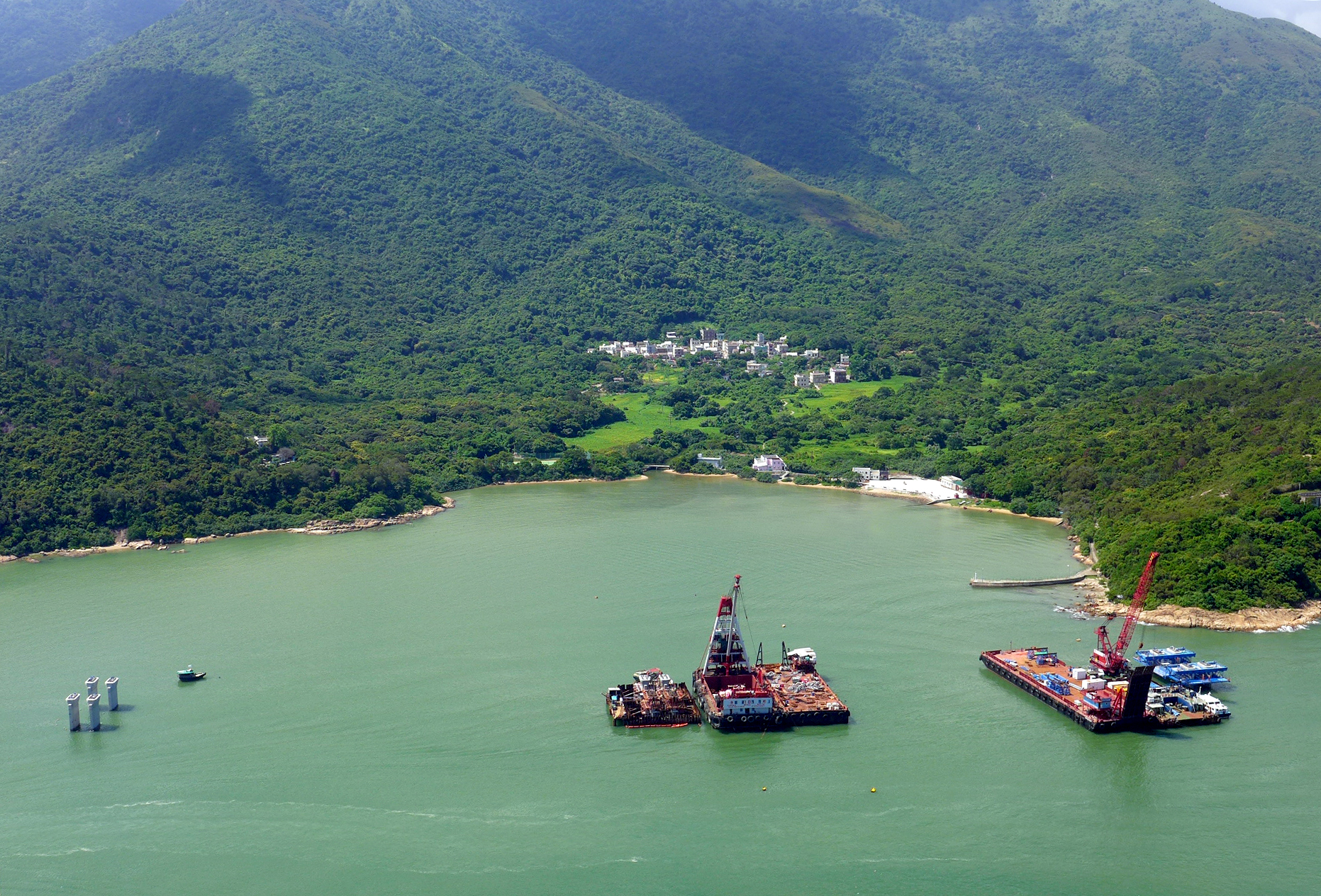
The bay of Sha Lo Wan in 2015, with the village of Sha Lo Wan Tsuen slightly inland. Construction work for the Hong Kong–Zhuhai–Macau Bridge is taking place in the bay.

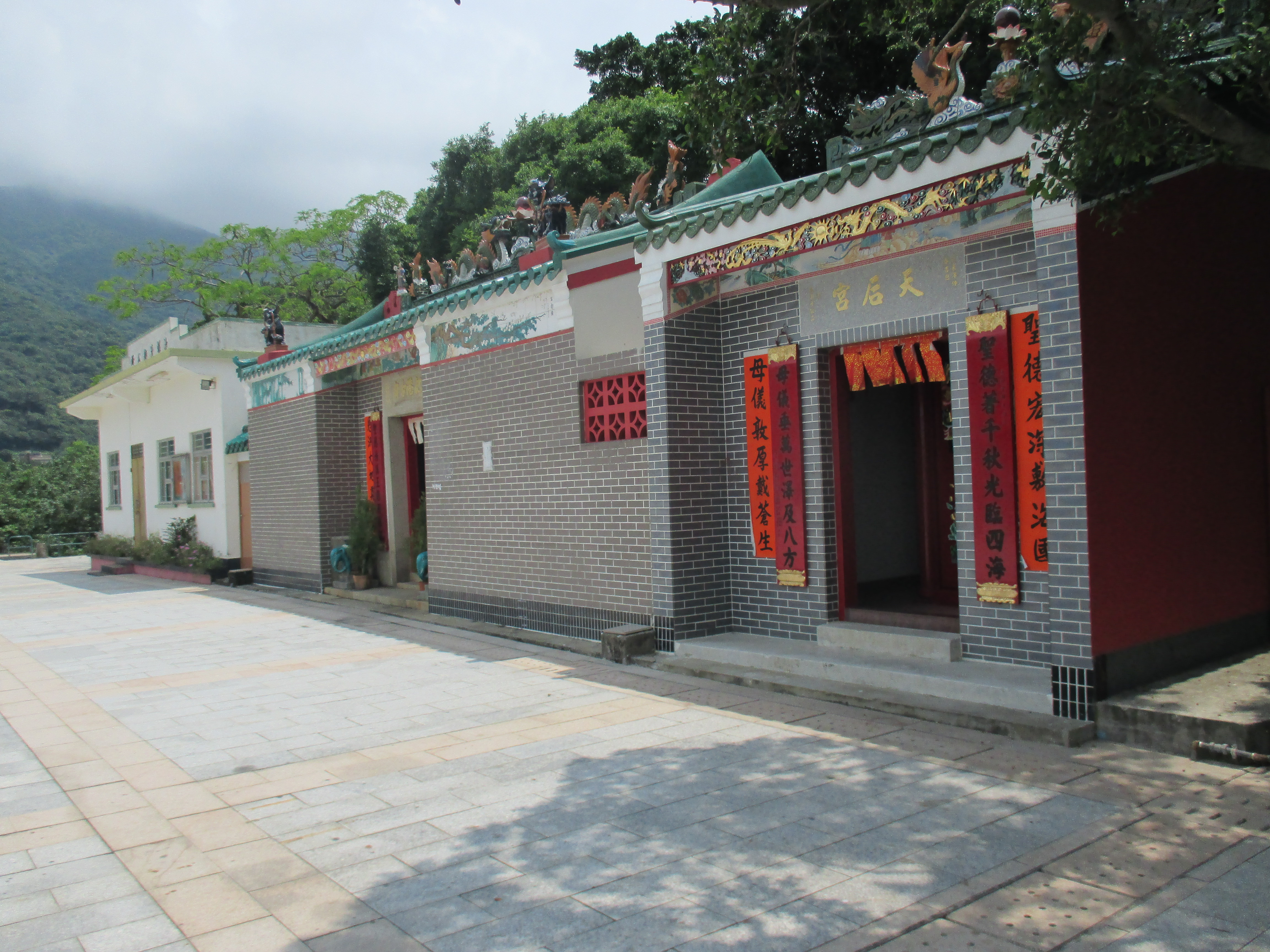
From left to right: Sha Lo Wan Village Office (沙螺灣鄉公所), Ba Kong and Tin Hau temples.

Sha Lo Wan (Chinese: 沙螺灣) is a bay in the northwest Lantau Island, Hong Kong. The bay faces north to Hong Kong International Airport. The area is occupied by indigenous inhabitants. There is no vehicular access to the area and thus their communication is on foot or by ferry. Because of their inconvenient access to urban areas, villages in the area have suffered from depopulation. Only older generations live in these villages.

Villages in the area include Sha Lo Wan Tsuen (沙螺灣村; 'Sha Lo Wan Village'), Sha Lo Wan San Tsuen (沙螺灣新村; 'Sha Lo Wan New Village') and Sha Lo Wan Chung Hau (沙螺灣涌口).

== Administration ==
Sha Lo Wan is a recognized village under the New Territories Small House Policy.

== History ==
Sha Lo Wan was noted for its incense production during the Ming dynasty. Following the orders imposed by the Great Clearance, the village was evacuated, together with the whole of Lantau Island. People were allowed to return to settle on the island in 1669, but Sha Lo Wan was not resettled at that time.

Sha Lo Wan Tsuen was probably erected in the 18th century, as a Ba Kong Temple (把港古廟; 'guarding the bay') dedicated to Hung Shing was built by the villagers in 1774 at the northwest of the village, close to the seashore. Villagers were engaged in fishing and farming. The population was small reaching up to a few hundred before the Second World War. Being close to the sea, the village was often attacked by pirates and bandits. In the late 1930s, it was occupied by a group of pirates for one year.

Tungsten was discovered in Sha Lo Wan, and its ore was quarried in the area in the 1950s, leading to a population increase, which reached 4,000 in 1971. The population has dropped again since the 1970s.

== Features ==
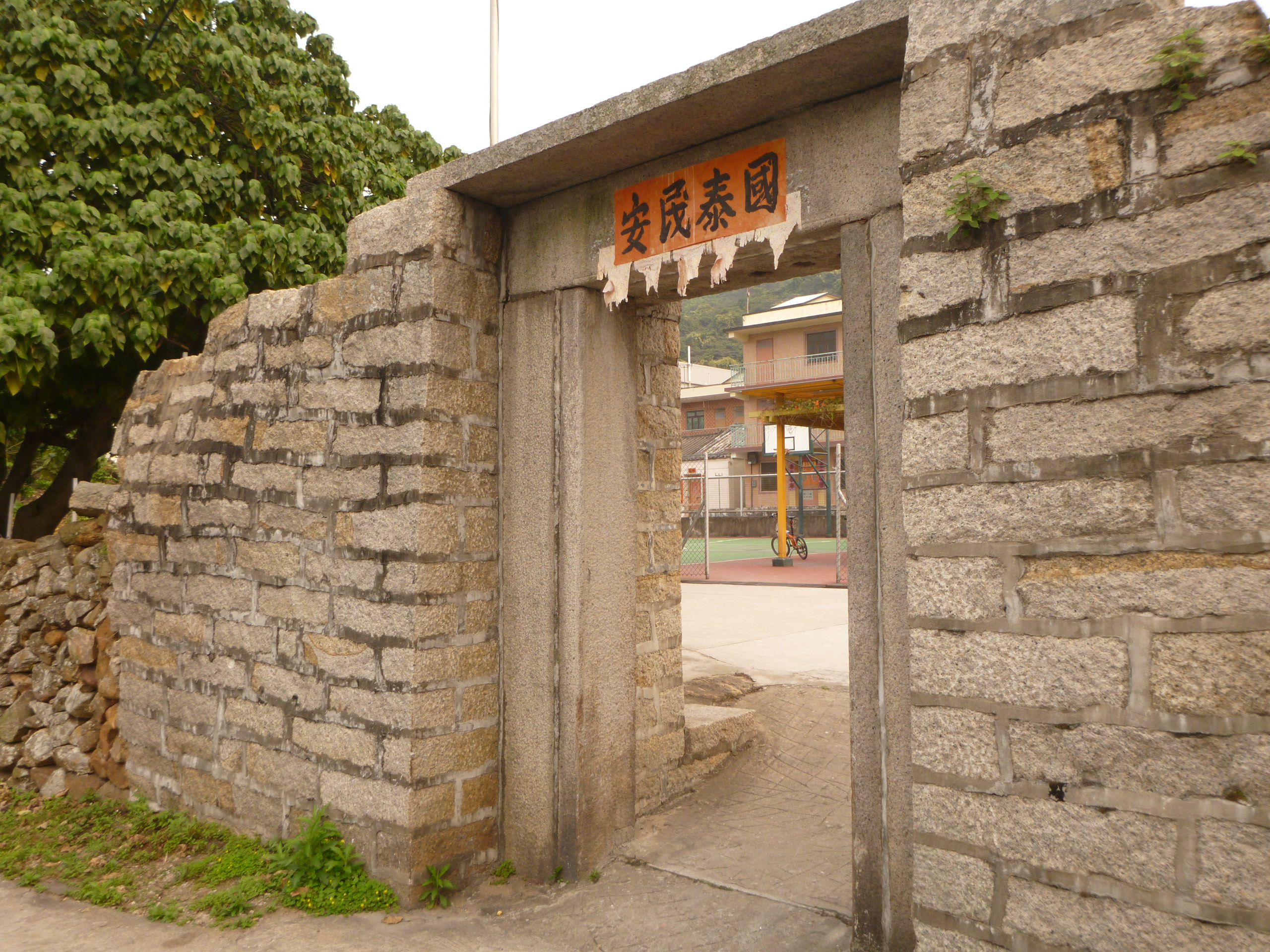
Entrance gate of Sha Lo Wan Tsuen.

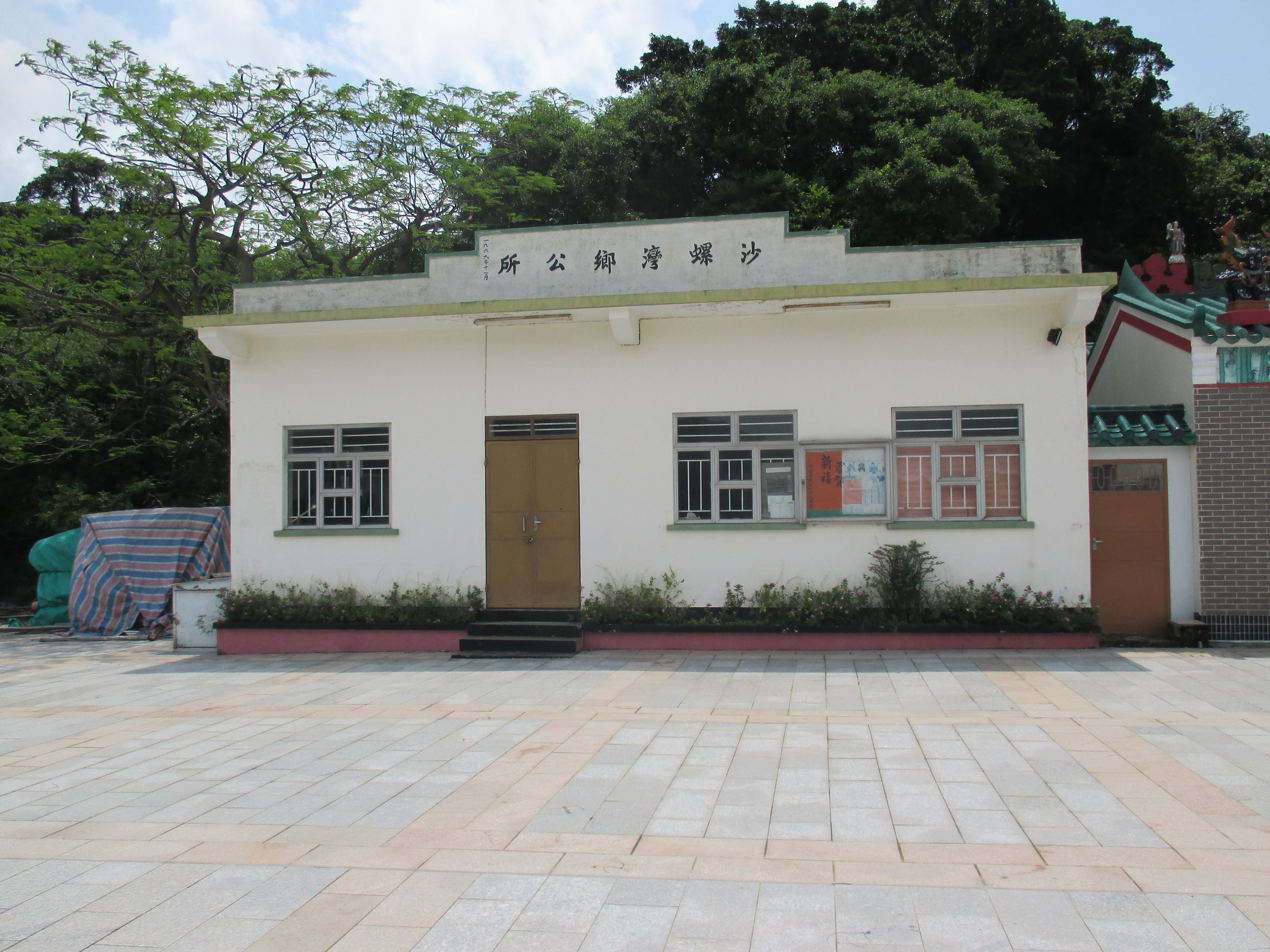
Sha Lo Wan Village Office.

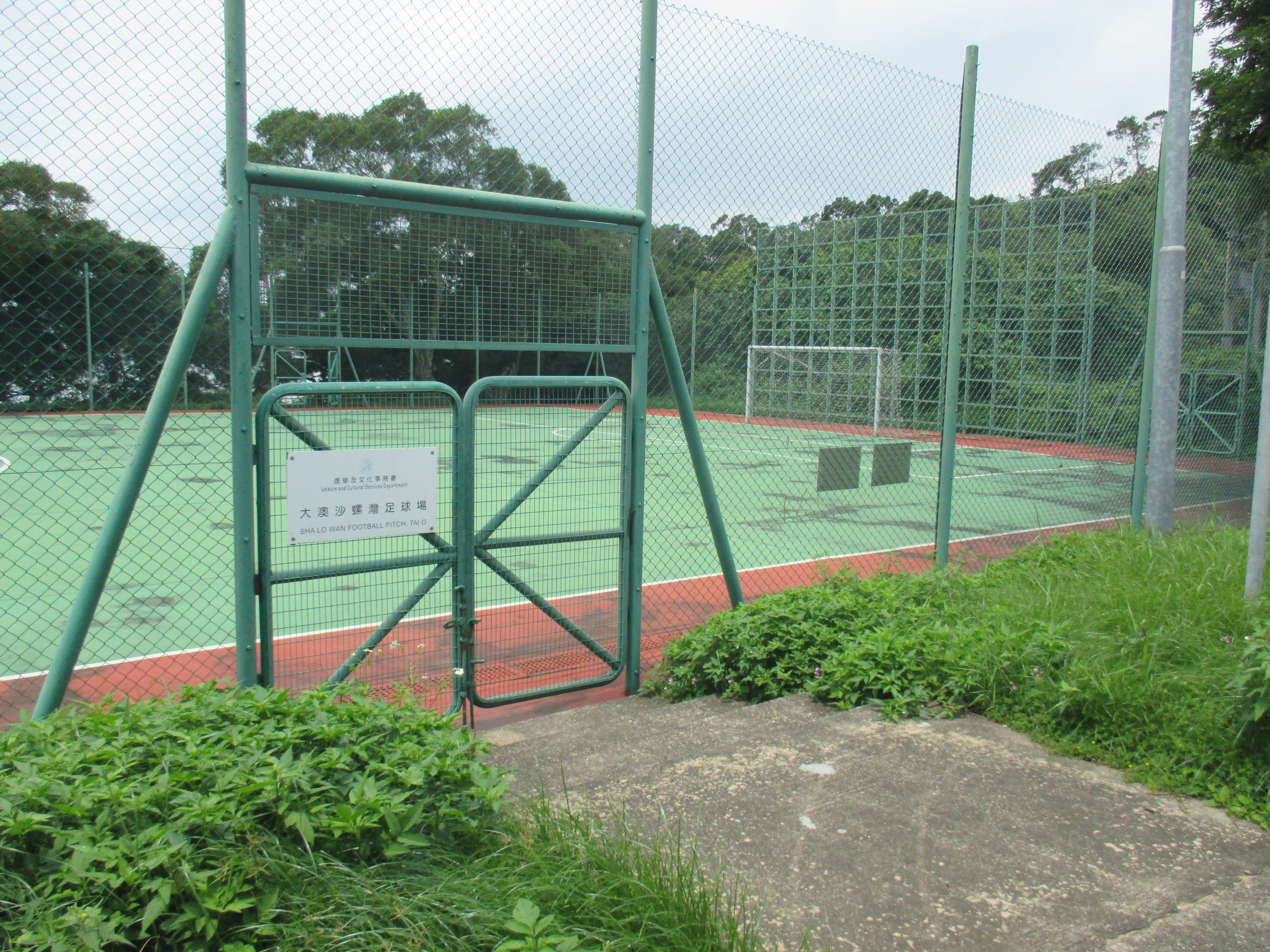
Sha Lo Wan Football Pitch.

The bay is a preserved tropical natural environment. Thick and high trunks of trees can be found in the area.

Sha Lo Wan Tsuen was constructed in the form of four parallel rows of houses. A 3m high village entrance gate, built about 200 years ago of granite blocks and slabs, remains in the north of the village, while the attached defensive wall has been demolished. There are three ancestral halls in the village.

Two adjacent temples are located at Sha Lo Wan, near the coast. The Ba Kong Temple, dedicated to Hung Shing, was built in 1774. To its right is a Tin Hau Temple, built in 1919. A wall is connecting the two temples at the front façade. They are sometimes collectively referred to as "Ba Kong Temple and Tin Hau Palace" (把港古廟及天后宮).

Besides the small Sha Lo Wan Playground, the village only other attraction is Tung Chung Sha Lo Wan Beach.

== Events ==
The Sha Lo Wan Village Office (沙螺灣鄉公所) and the Hung Shing Festival Committee of Lantau Island hold an annual Hung Shing Festival (洪聖誕) in Sha Lo Wan from the 10th to the 13th day of the seventh lunar month. Celebrations include worship of deities and Cantonese opera performances.

== Incidents ==
In 2013, Sha Lo Wan villagers were dissatisfied that the government had shelved a 6.5-kilometer-long coastal road from Tung Chung to Tai O, stifling the development of the village. Since November, the village has been indefinitely closed on holidays. More than forty villagers blocked road at the east and west entrances to prevent a large number of people from pouring into the village during the holidays and causing nuisance to the villagers. The Sha Lo Wan Village Concern Group emphasized that the village road will not be reopened until the government has given a satisfactory answer.

Subsequently, the village is closed again on 30 September 2020, and the iron gates entering the village were closed. The notice claimed that the village had been closed in 2014, but it was attacked by some tourists and endangered the lives and property of the villagers. Therefore, non-Sha Lo Wan Village residents and all government departments and public institutions are prohibited to enter the Sha Lo Wan Village, otherwise they will be regarded as thieves. The Lands Department alleged that the iron gate entering the village violated regulations and was cleared on 9 October. But afterwards, some villagers continued to block the roads by themselves, holding long sticks and so on to drive away the citizens, and verbally criticized the cyclists, runners or hikers who passed by. Later, the media revealed that the roads near Sham Wat and Sham Shek villages were illegally dug, and the illegally expanded roads were one kilometer long; in addition, the villagers ignored the warnings from the authorities and added at least three new iron gates as railings and wrote "No entry except authorized" warning sign. Some environmental protection groups criticized the government for failing to enforce the law in the past few weeks and tolerating villagers to damage the environment to expand roads. This may cause more development pressure in the future, and the environmental damage will be beyond control.

== Access ==
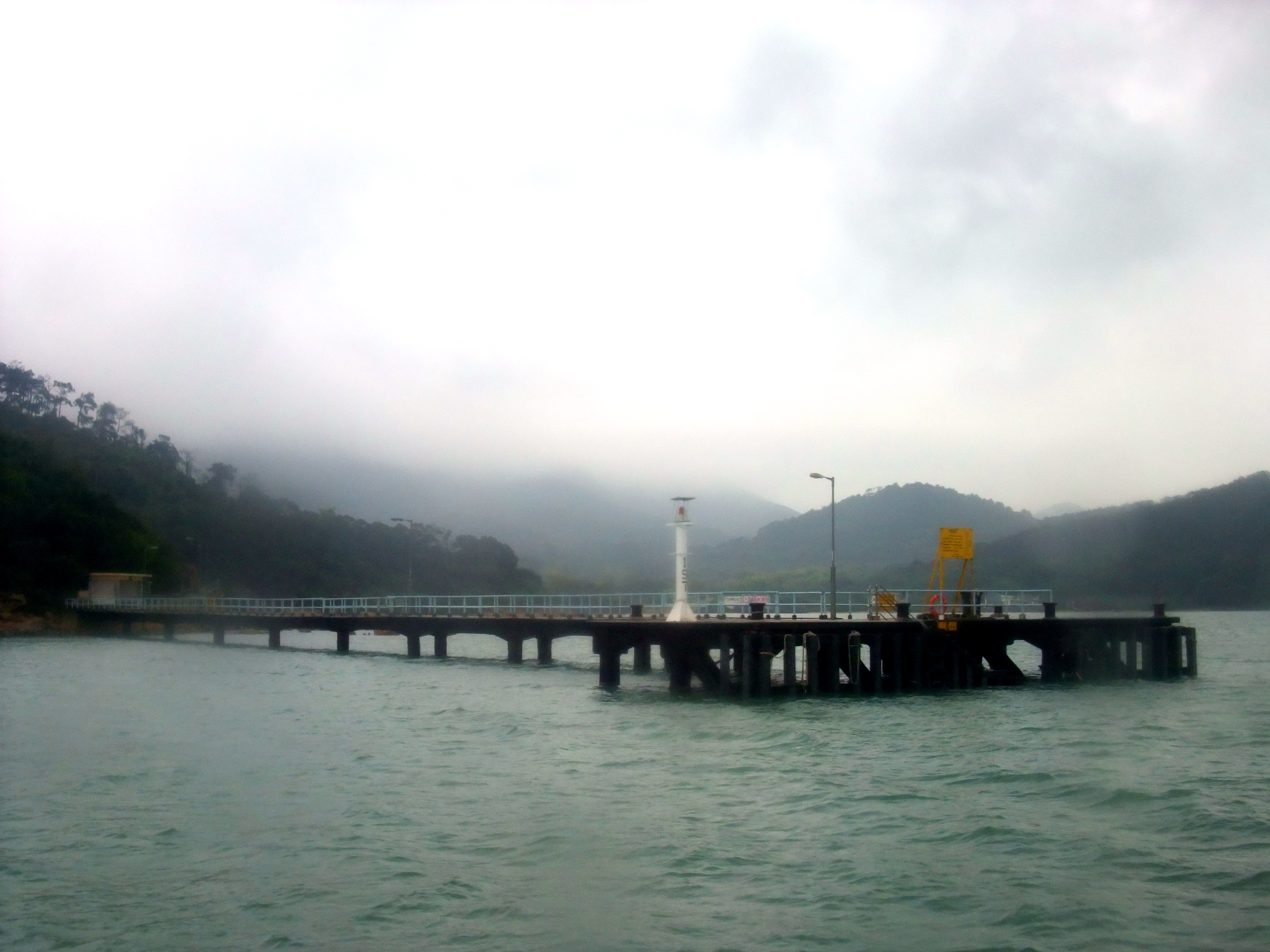
Sha Lo Wan Pier

=== By foot ===
Sha Lo Wan is situated on the trail from Tai O to Tung Chung, known as the Tung O Ancient Trail (東澳古道) that heads east along Tung Chung Bay.

=== Other ===
There is no vehicular access to the area, but the construction of a road linking Tai O and Tung Chung, and serving Sha Lo Wan, has been proposed in 2014.

The area is served by ferries operated by Fortune Ferry to Tung Chung, Tai O and Tuen Mun at the end of Sha Lo Wan Pier.

== Climate ==
Climate data for Sha Lo Wan (1993–2016)
Month	Jan	Feb	Mar	Apr	May	Jun	Jul	Aug	Sep	Oct	Nov	Dec	Year
Record high °C (°F)	28.8 (83.8)	30.1 (86.2)	32.6 (90.7)	33.6 (92.5)	35.3 (95.5)	35.3 (95.5)	36.2 (97.2)	36.7 (98.1)	35.0 (95.0)	34.4 (93.9)	32.7 (90.9)	30.8 (87.4)	36.7 (98.1)
Mean daily maximum °C (°F)	19.3 (66.7)	20.3 (68.5)	23.1 (73.6)	26.2 (79.2)	29.7 (85.5)	31.0 (87.8)	31.9 (89.4)	31.7 (89.1)	30.9 (87.6)	29.1 (84.4)	25.4 (77.7)	21.0 (69.8)	26.7 (80.1)
Daily mean °C (°F)	15.7 (60.3)	16.8 (62.2)	19.5 (67.1)	23.2 (73.8)	26.2 (79.2)	27.9 (82.2)	28.5 (83.3)	28.3 (82.9)	27.3 (81.1)	25.3 (77.5)	21.7 (71.1)	17.3 (63.1)	23.2 (73.8)
Mean daily minimum °C (°F)	13.0 (55.4)	14.3 (57.7)	16.8 (62.2)	20.7 (69.3)	23.7 (74.7)	25.7 (78.3)	26.0 (78.8)	25.7 (78.3)	24.9 (76.8)	22.8 (73.0)	18.9 (66.0)	14.5 (58.1)	20.6 (69.1)
Record low °C (°F)	1.6 (34.9)	4.2 (39.6)	6.7 (44.1)	9.9 (49.8)	15.9 (60.6)	19.7 (67.5)	22.5 (72.5)	21.2 (70.2)	18.1 (64.6)	14.9 (58.8)	8.1 (46.6)	2.5 (36.5)	1.6 (34.9)
Source: Hong Kong Observatory
