= Tai O =

Tai O 大澳
- Village
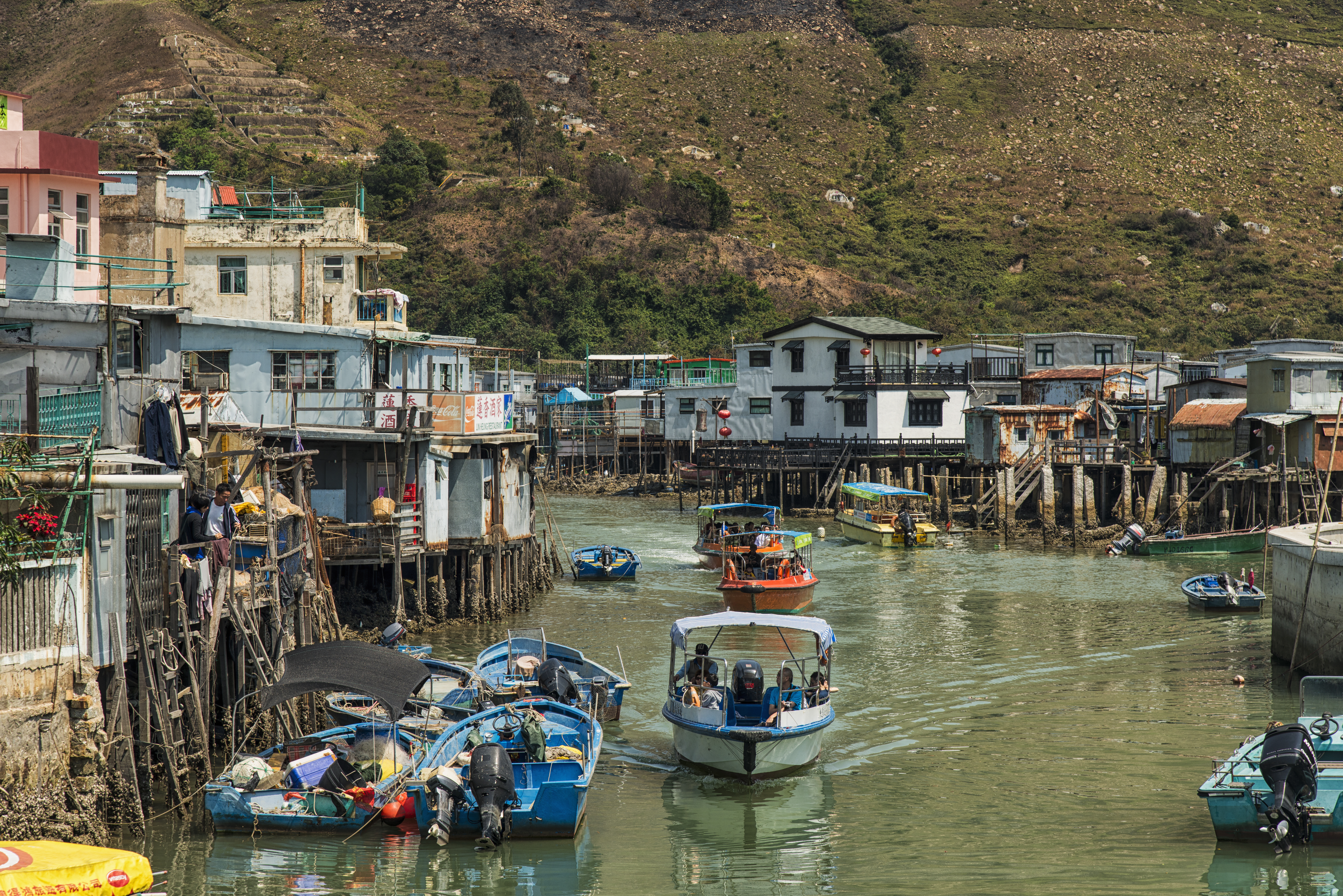

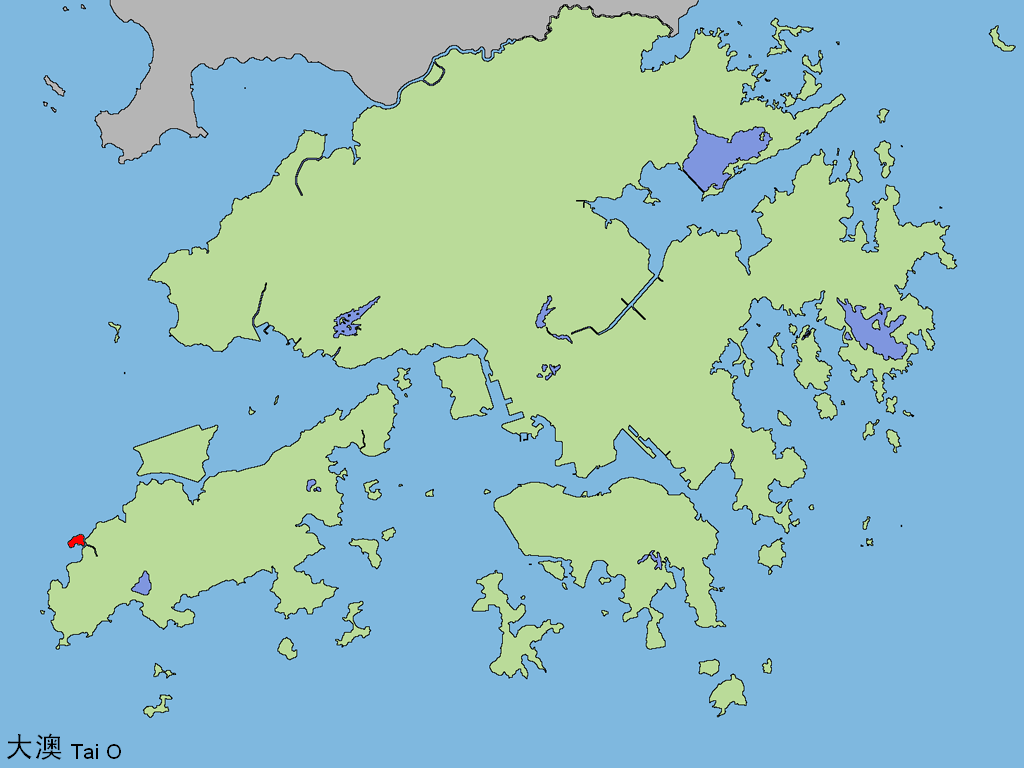
- Location of Tai O within Hong Kong
- Coordinates: 22°15′16″N 113°51′51″E
- Country: China
- SAR: Hong Kong
- District: Islands

Population (2011)
  - Total: 1,200 (approx)

Tai O
- Chinese: 大澳
Transcriptions
Standard Mandarin
- Hanyu Pinyin: Dà Ào
Yue: Cantonese
- Yale Romanization: Daaih ou
- Jyutping: Daai6 ou3

Tai O (Chinese: 大澳; Jyutping: daai6 ou3; Cantonese Yale: Daaih’Ou) is a fishing town, partly located on an island of the same name, on the western side of Lantau Island in Hong Kong. The village name means large inlet, referring to outlet for the waterways (Tai O Creek and Tai O River) merges as it moves through Tai O.

== Geography ==
On the southwest part of Lantau Island, Tai O River splits to the north (as Tai O Creek) and west and at this fork lies the island referred to as Tai O. Two pedestrian bridges cross the river on its northern and western forks. The village is located mostly on the banks of the river. The western and northern parts of the island facing the South China Sea are uninhabited.

== History ==
Nearby archaeological sites date back to the Stone Age, but permanent, and verifiable, human settlement here is only three centuries old. Stories that would be impossible to substantiate have Tai O as the base of many smuggling and piracy operations, the inlets of the river providing excellent protection from the weather and a hiding place. In early 16th century, Tai O was once occupied shortly by Portuguese during the Battle of Tamão, the remains is known as Fan Kwai Tong (番鬼塘, "Foreign devil pond") today.

Tai O is one of five villages of Lantau that were resettled when the coastal restriction of the Great Clearance was lifted in 1669. The other villages are Tung Sai Chung, Lo Pui O, Shek Pik and Mui Wo.

At nearby Fan Lau, a fort was built in 1729 to protect shipping on the Pearl River. Smuggling of guns, tobacco, drugs and people remains a documented illegal activity both into and out of mainland China.

When the British came to Hong Kong, Tai O was known as a Tanka village. The Battle of Ty-ho Bay, a naval engagement fought in 1855, involved British and United States naval forces in a joint operation against Chinese pirates.

At the time of the 1911 census, the population of Shek Tsai Po of Tai O was 118; the number of males was 71. The population of Tai O, both land and boat based, was 7,661; the number of males was 4,318.

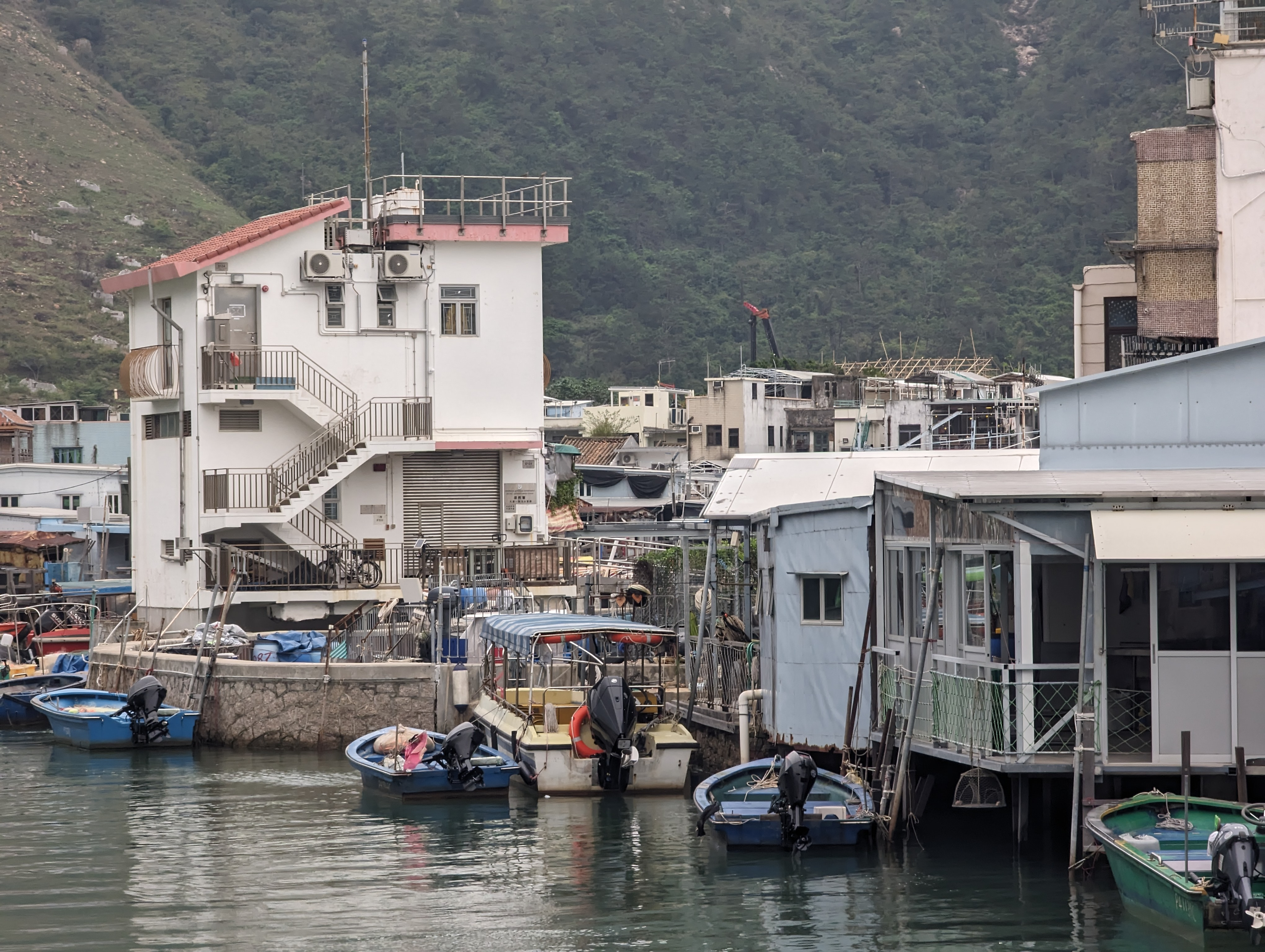
Tai O in 2024

During and after the Chinese Civil War, Tai O became a primary entrypoint for illegal immigration for those escaping from the People's Republic of China. Some of these immigrants, mostly Cantonese, stayed in Tai O, and Tai O attracted people from other Hong Kong ethnic groups, including Hoklo (Hokkien) and Hakka.

Tai O has a history of salt production. In 1940, it was recorded that the Tai O salt marshes were covering 70 acres (28 ha) and that the production has amounted to 25,000 piculs (1,512 metric tons) in 1938.

Currently the fishing lifestyle is dying out. While many residents continue to fish, it barely provides a subsistence income. There is a public school on the island and most young people move away when they come of age. In 2000, a large fire broke out destroying many residences.

== Points of interest ==
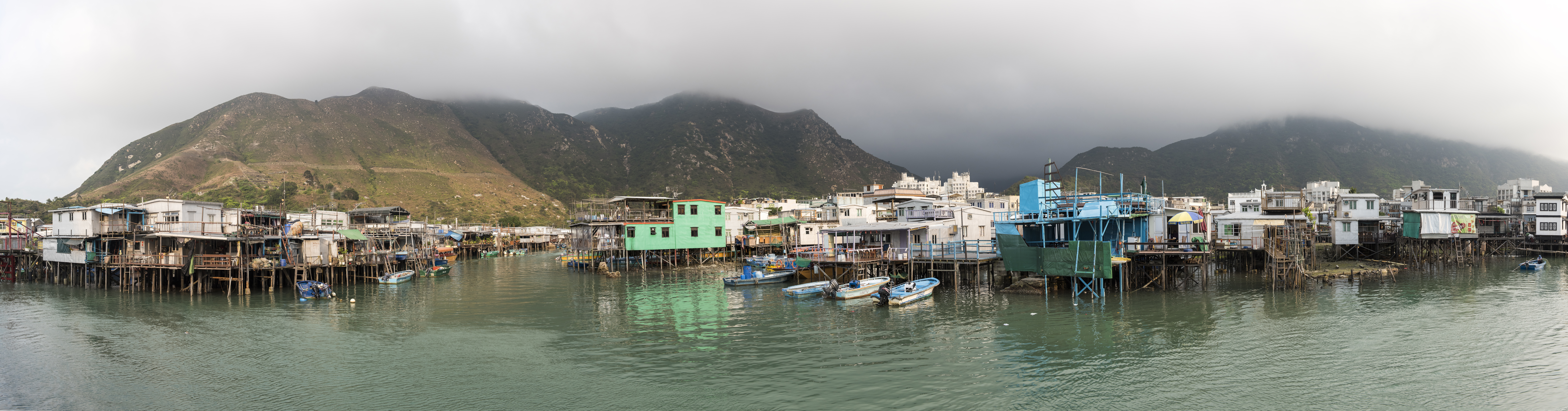
Stilt houses (pang uk) in Tai O

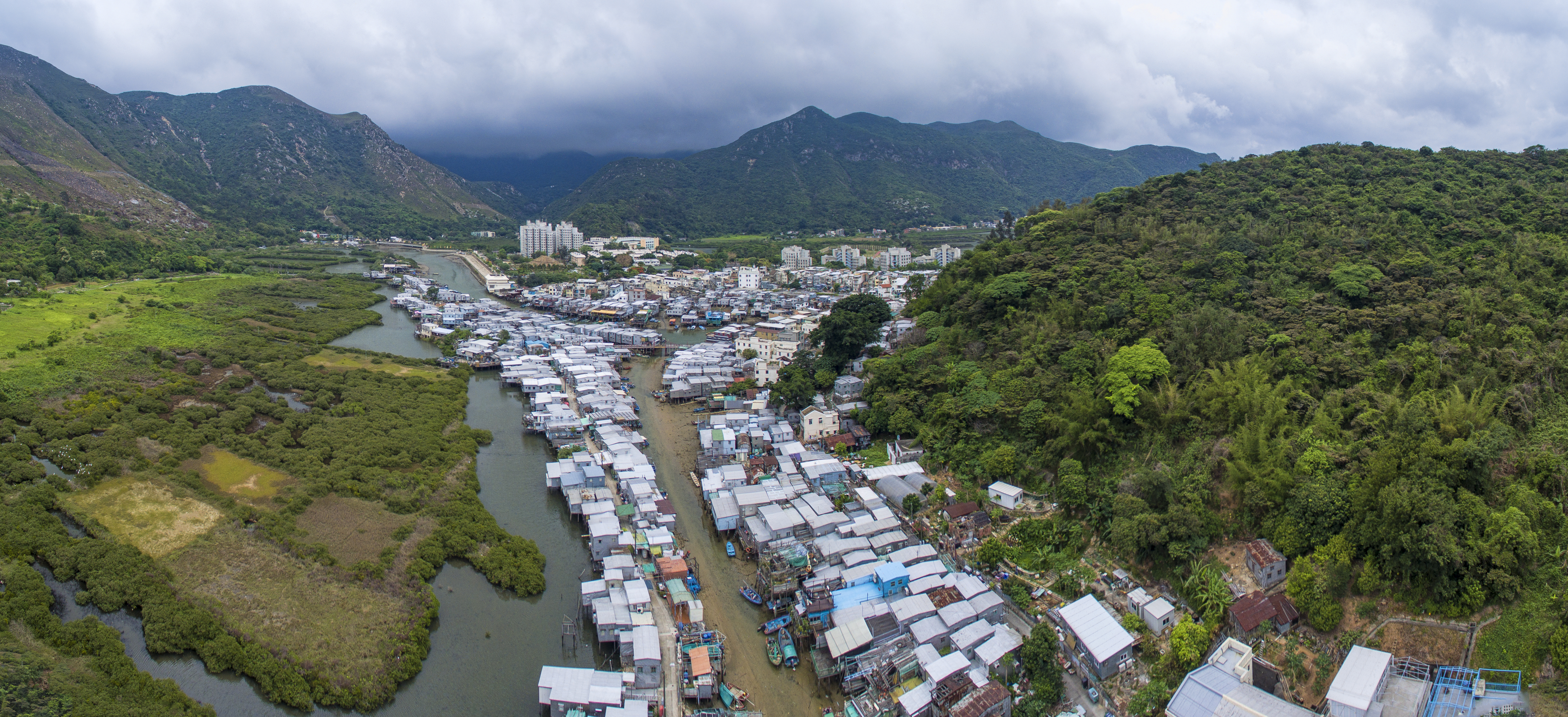
Aerial panorama

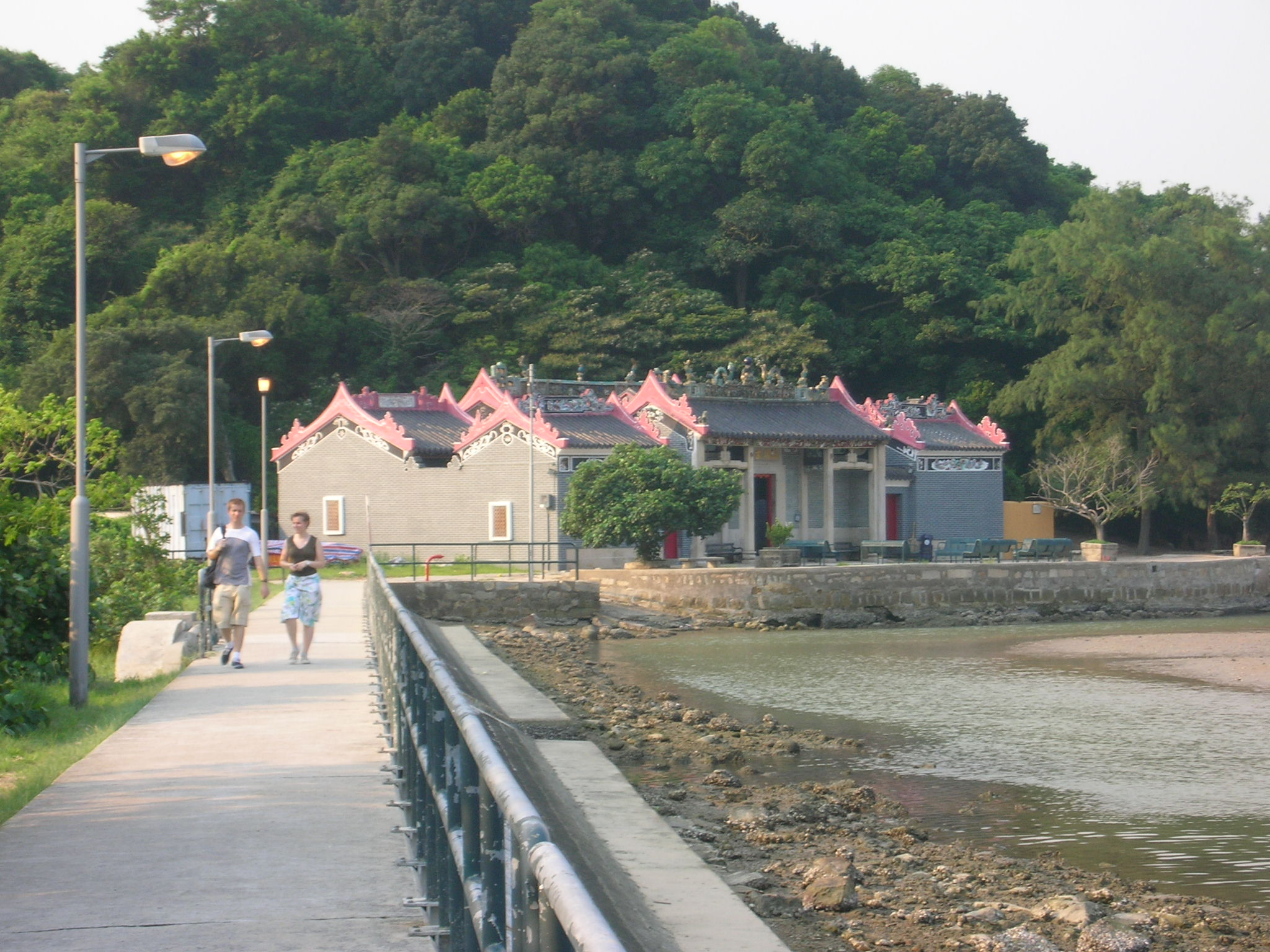
Yeung Hau Temple in Tai O

=== Heritage ===
Graded buildings in Tai O include:

- Yeung Hau Temple, built in 1699 (Declared monument)
- Old Tai O Police Station (Grade II)
- Kwan Tai Temple, Kat Hing Back Street. Built in 1741. (Grade II)
- Tin Hau Temple, Kat Hing Back Street. Built in 1772, it is connected to the left of Kwan Tai Temple.
- Fong Bin Yuen. (Grade III)
- No. 23 Kat Hing Back Street. (Grade III)
- Shek Lun Kok, No. 33 Kat Hing Back Street. (Grade III)
- No. 46-48 Kat Hing Street, pre-war shophouses. (Grade III)
- Wing Hing Petrol Station, No. 99C Kat Hing Back Street. (Grade III)

Other historical buildings include:

- Hip Wo Se Hok, No. 151 Tai Ping Street, a former school.
- Hung Shing Temple, Shek Tsai Po Street. Built in 1746.

=== Tourism ===
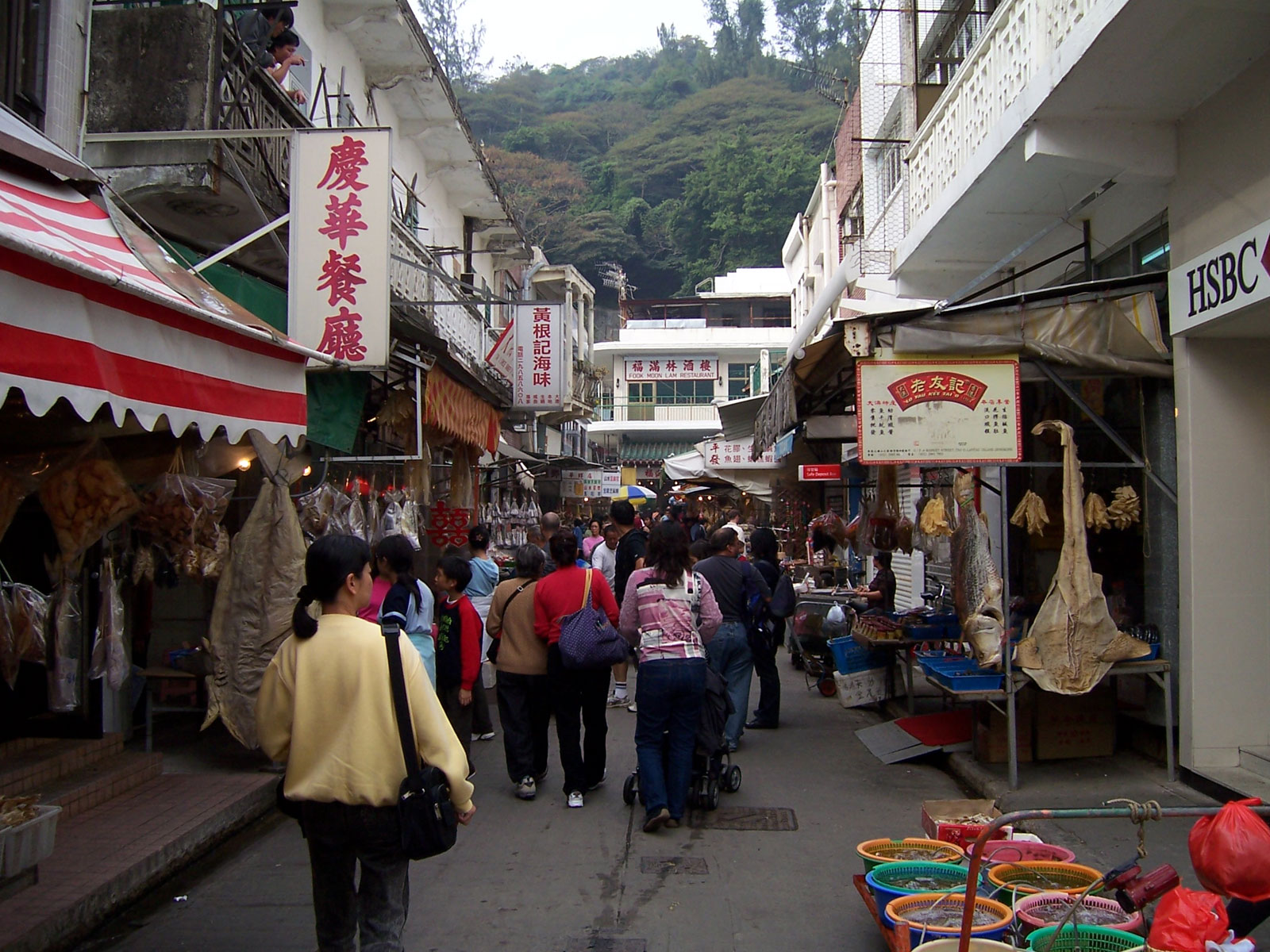
Seafood vendors in Tai O

Also known as the "Venice of Hong Kong", Tai O is a tourist spot for both foreigners and residents of other parts of Hong Kong, despite damage by a fire in July 2000. The pang uks, a kind of stilt house, built right over the waterway are still quite scenic. A cable ferry tended by local women used to be quite popular with visitors, but it was replaced with a steel pedestrian bridge in October 1996.

The traditional salted fish and shrimp paste are sold at storefronts in Tai O. For a small fee, some residents will take tourists out on their boats along the river and for short jaunts into the sea. Many tourists come to Tai O specifically to take these trips to see Chinese white dolphins, also known as "Pink Dolphins". It is also a good place to see the sunset.

Old Tai O Police Station, a Grade II historic building, has been turned into a boutique hotel called Tai O Heritage Hotel by Hong Kong Heritage Conservation Foundation. The hotel has nine rooms and a restaurant. The hotel has been open and operational since 2012.

Tai O Rural Committee Historic and Cultural Showroom, located within the centuries-old fishing village of Tai O, exhibits relics of the local community's past, including fishing tools and dismantled old structures. The showroom was founded by the Tai O Rural Committee and all the items in its collection were donated by local residents.

== Education ==
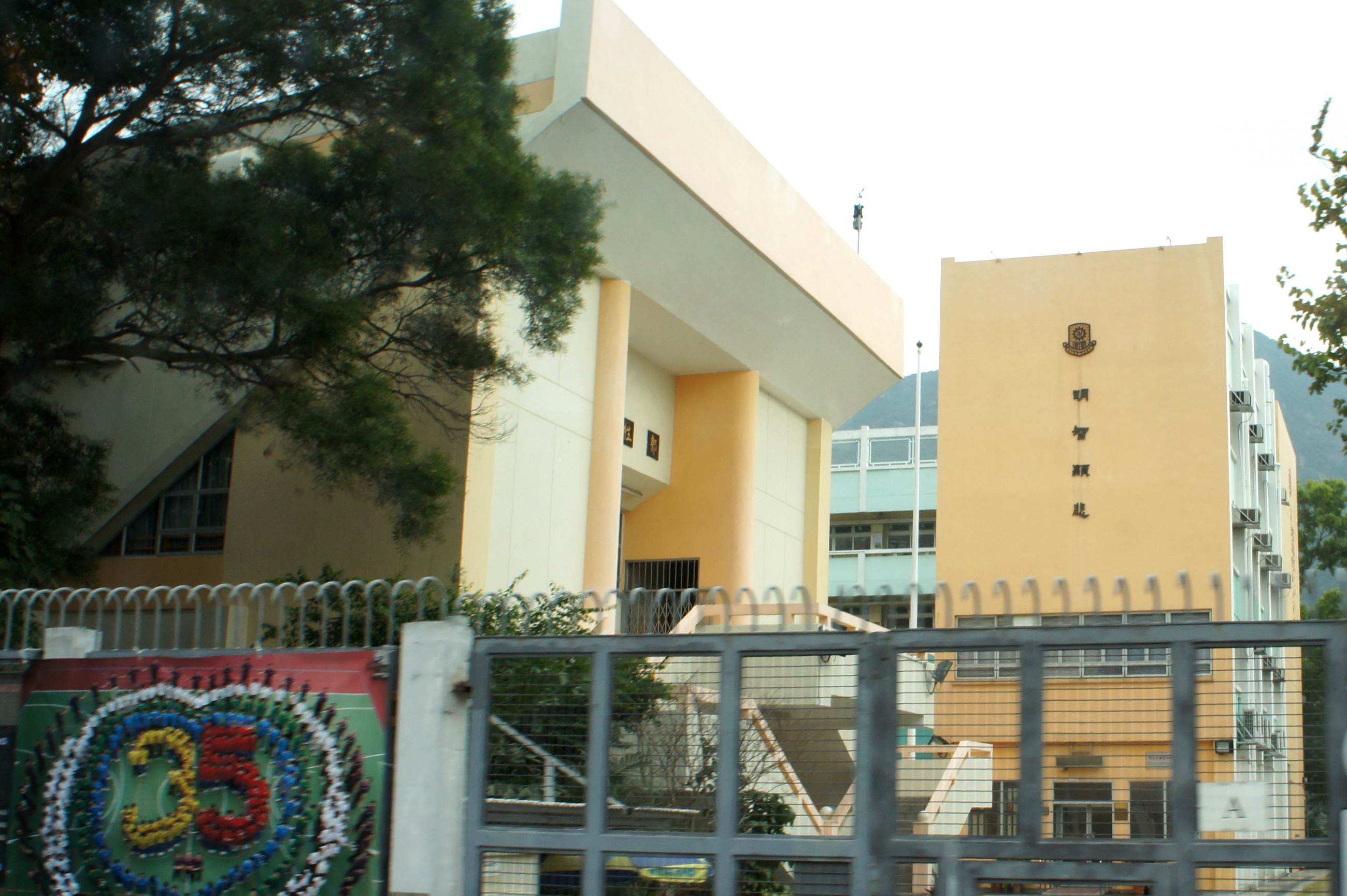
Buddhist Fat Ho Memorial College

There are two kindergartens, one primary school and one secondary school. They are Church of Christ in China (CCC) Tai O Primary School (中華基督教會大澳小學) and Buddhist Fat Ho Memorial College.

Most of Lantau Island, Tai O included, is in Primary One Admission (POA) School Net 98, which contains multiple aided schools on Lantau Island, including CCC Tai O Primary School; no government primary schools are in this net.

Hong Kong Public Libraries operates Tai O Public Library.

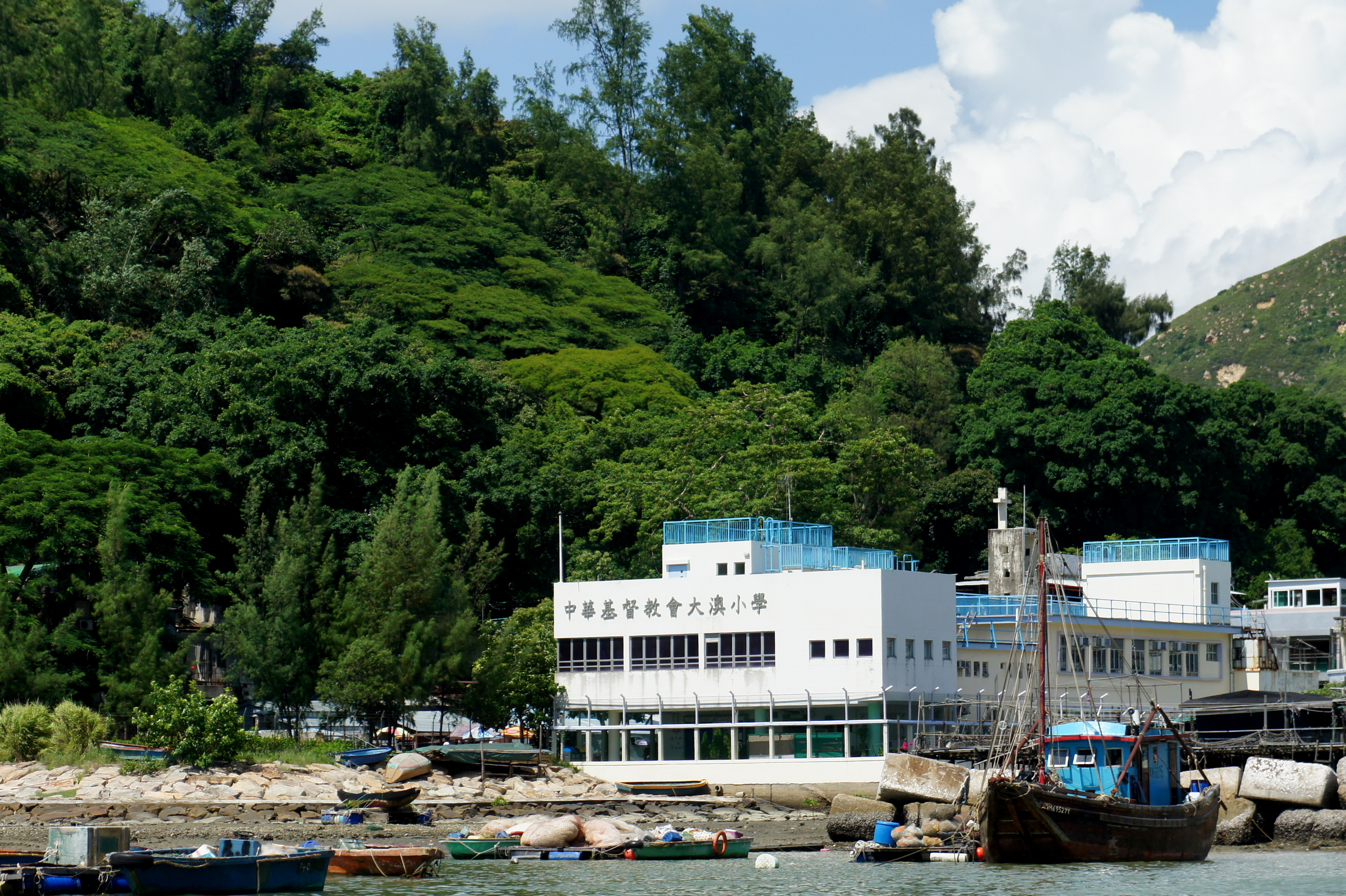
Church of Christ in China (CCC) Tai O Primary School

== Transport ==
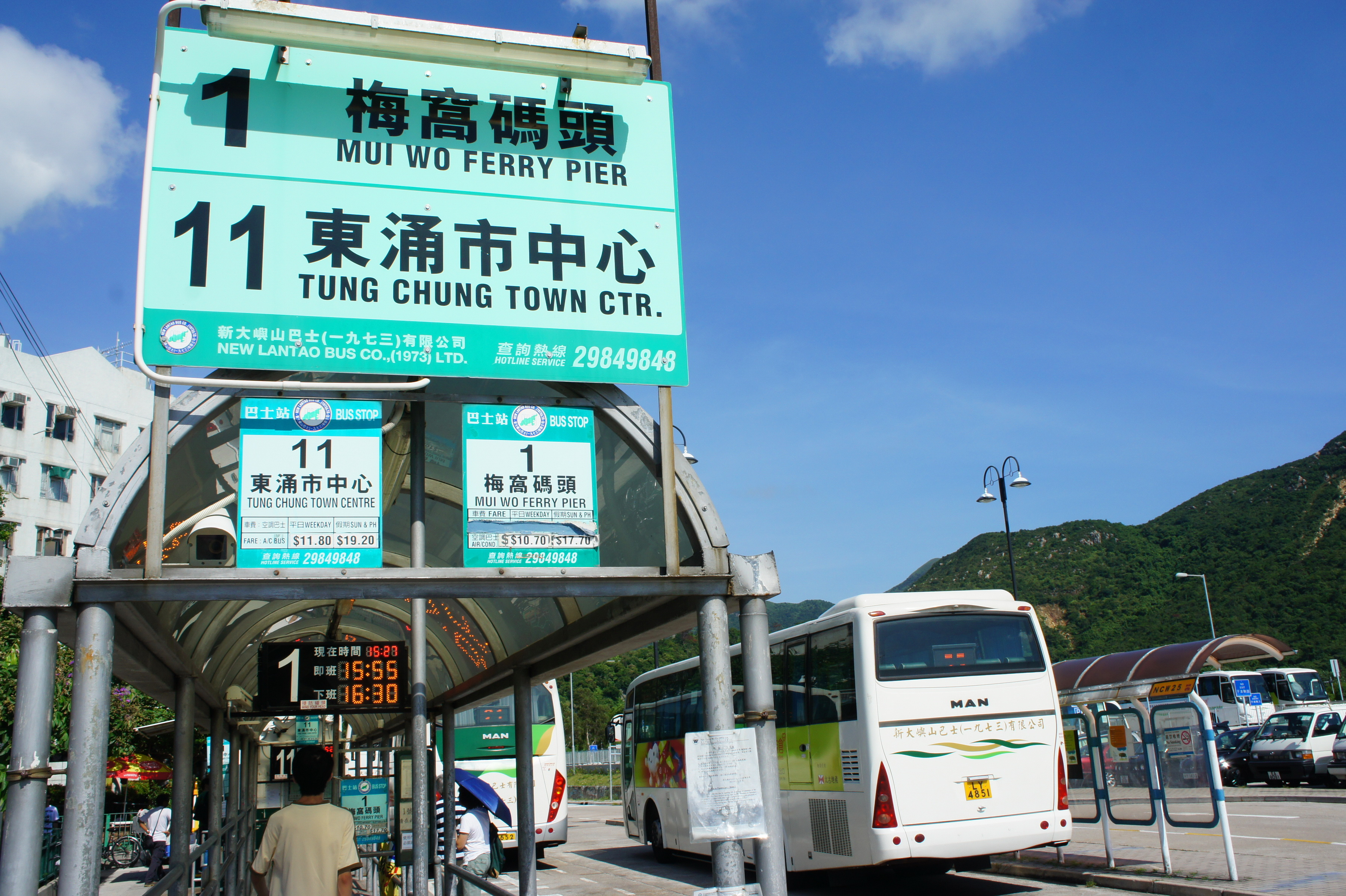
Bus terminus in Tai O

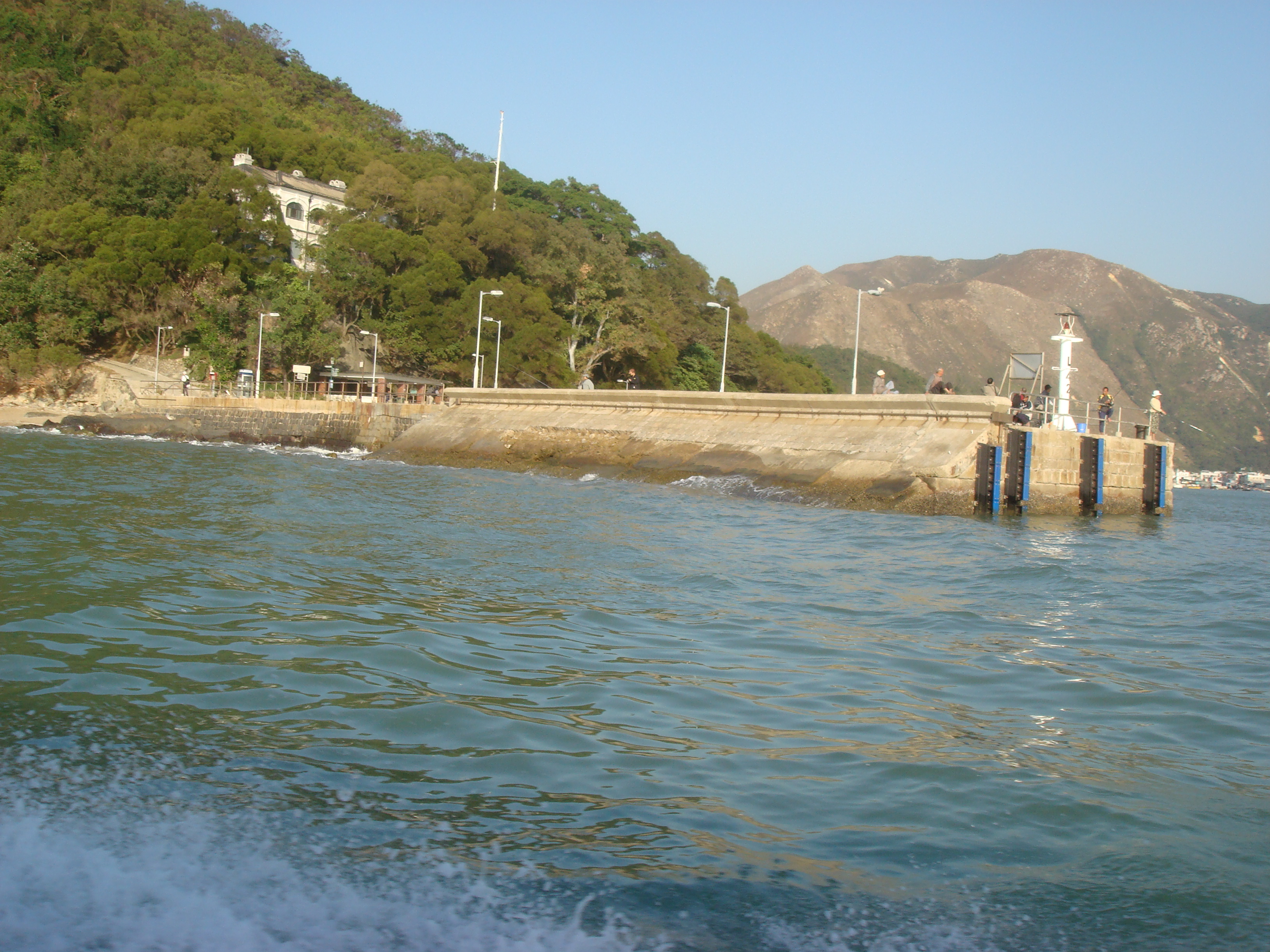
Shek Tsai Po Ferry Pier and former Tai O Police Station.

Tai O can be reached by bus (New Lantau Bus) from the following places:

- Mui Wo – Bus no. 1
- Tung Chung – Bus no. 11
- Ngong Ping – Bus no. 21

There are ferry piers on Tai O, close to Tai O Bus Terminus. It operates daily as the following routes connecting Tai O:

- Tuen Mun (Tuen Mun Ferry Pier) – service by Fortune Ferry
- Tung Chung (Tung Chung New Development Ferry Pier) – service by Fortune Ferry
- Sha Lo Wan – operated by Fortune Ferry

== People ==
- Cilla Kung, actress and singer; was born and raised in Tai O.

== In popular culture ==
A 1998 Hong Kong drama A Place of One's Own by TVB starring Adia Chan and Mariane Chan is set in Tai O.

A 2021 Hong Kong drama Ossan's Love by ViuTV starring Edan Lui and Anson Lo is set in Tai O.

== See also ==
- List of islands and peninsulas of Hong Kong
- List of villages in Hong Kong
- Battle of Ty-ho Bay (1855)
- Fu Shan
- Tung O Ancient Trail
- Leung Uk, a village in the vicinity of Tai O
