= List of Zhou dynasty states =

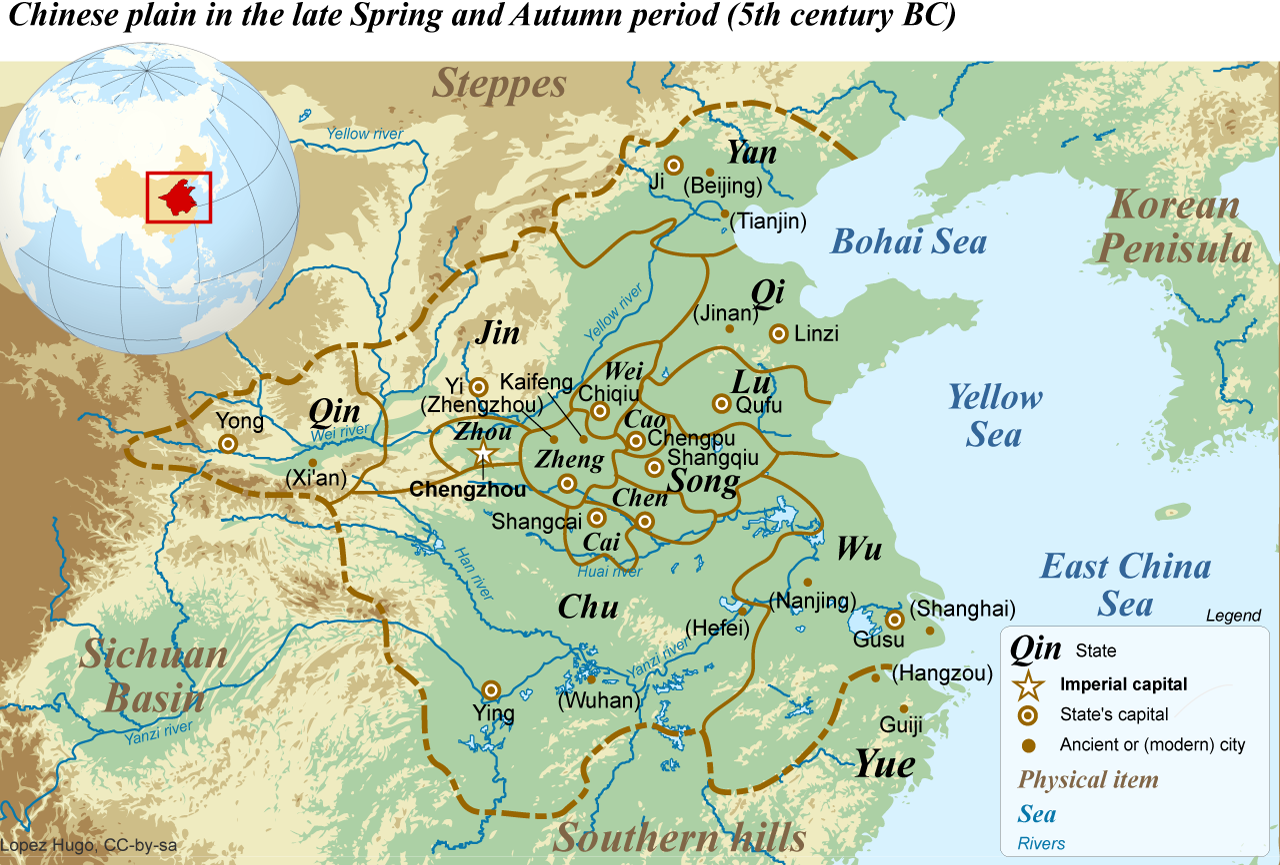
States during the Spring and Autumn period

The following ancient Chinese states were parts of the geopolitical milieu during the Zhou dynasty of early China, during one or more of its main chronological subdivisions: the Western Zhou period, Spring and Autumn period, and Warring States period. Listed below are the names of various polities, the aristocratic houses and lineages of their ruling families, locations relative to modern Chinese geography, noble titles of the rulers, start and end years, and conquerors.

== Zhou royal family ==
Name of state	Hanzi	Family	Present location	Title	Start and end year	Conqueror
Western Zhou	西周	Ji (姬姓)	Nominal rule over all under Heaven, directly controlling the capital of Fenghao, Zongzhou (present Xi'an, Shaanxi Province), Luoyi, Chengzhou (present Luoyang, Henan Province), and nearby areas.	King (Son of Heaven)	1046–771 BCE	Shen, Quanrong
Eastern Zhou	東周	Ji (姬姓)	Nominal rule (loosely) over all under Heaven, in reality only controlling a small area around the capital city of Luoyi (present Luoyang)	King (Son of Heaven)	770–256 BCE	Qin

== States during the Western Zhou and Spring and Autumn periods (1046–403 BCE) ==
=== Main States ===
Name of state	Hanzi	Family	Present location	Title	Start and end year	Conqueror
Qin	秦國	Ying (嬴姓) Zhao(趙氏)	South central Shaanxi Province and eastern Gansu Province; later expanded into Sichuan Province, Chongqing, western Henan Province, western Hubei Province, and other areas. Unified in 221 BCE.	Zhong and Bo (conferred in 770 BCE); Wang (self-proclaimed from 325 BCE); Emperor (in 288 BCE, called the "emperor" of the west, respected Qi as the "emperor" of the east, later abolished); Emperor of China (renamed after the unification of the country in 221 BCE)	Approximately 900–206 BCE	Western Chu Hegemon–King Xiang Yu and Emperor Gaozu of Han
Wey	衛國	Ji (姬姓) Wey (衛氏)	Qi County and Puyang City, Henan Province	Hou, Jun (renamed 330 BCE)	1040–209 BCE	Qin
Yue	越國	Si (姒姓)	Zhejiang Province. Became Minzhong Commandery after being conquered by Qin in 222 BCE. Granted kingship over Minyue and Dong'ou after the fall of the Qin Dynasty.	Zi (Self-styled Wang)	c. 20th century BCE–222 BCE	Qin, (Successor states of Minyue and Dong'ou conquered by the Han dynasty)
Yan	燕國	Ji (姬姓) Yan (燕氏)	Southern Liaoning Province, Beijing City, Tianjin City, northern Hebei Province	Hou, Wang (Self-proclaimed 323 BCE)	1046–222 BCE	Qin
Chu	楚國	Mi (芈姓) Xiong (熊氏)	Hubei Province, southern Henan Province, and later parts of Anhui Province, Jiangxi Province, Hunan Province, Jiangsu Province, and Zhejiang Province	Zi, Wang (Self-Proclaimed 704 BCE)	Before 1046 BCE–223 BCE	Qin
Lu	魯國	Ji (姬姓) Lu (魯氏)	Qufu City, Shandong Province	Hou	1046–256 BCE	Chu
Song	宋國	Zi (子姓) Song (宋氏)	Shangqiu City, Tongxu County, Henan Province	Gong, Wang (Self-Proclaimed 323 BCE)	1040–286 BCE	Qi, Wei, Chu
Jin, originally known as Tang (唐國)	晉國	Ji (姬姓) Jin (晉氏)	Shanxi Province, northern Henan Province, eastern Shaanxi Province, western Hebei Province	Hou	1033–349 BCE	Han, Zhao, Wei (Three Families Partitioning Jin)
Zheng	鄭國	Ji (姬姓) Zheng 鄭氏	Hua County, Shaanxi Province. Later moved to Xinzheng City, Henan Province	Bo	806–375 BCE	Han
Qi, historically known as Jiang Qi	齊國	Jiang (姜姓) Lü (吕氏)	Eastern Shandong Province; southern Hebei Province	Hou	1046–386 BCE	Tian Qi
Cai	蔡國	Ji (姬姓) Cai (蔡氏)	Xincai County, Henan Province	Hou	1046–447 BCE	Chu
Wu	吳國	Ji (姬姓) Gufa (姑发氏)	Jiangsu Province; eastern Anhui Province	Zi (Self-styled Wang)	1096–473 BCE	Yue
Chen	陳國	Gui (媯姓) Chen (陳氏)	Huaiyang County, Henan Province	Hou	1046–478 BCE	Chu
Cao	曹國	Ji (姬姓) Cao (曹氏)	Southwestern Dingtao County, Shandong Province	Bo	1046–487 BCE	Song

=== Vassal states within the capital region (畿内) or fiefs granted to the aristocratic families during the Zhou dynasty ===
Name of state	Hanzi	Family	Present location	Title	Start and end year	Conqueror
Feng	酆國	Ji (姬姓)	Hu County, Shaanxi Province	Hou	1046–1023 BCE	Zhou dynasty
Fan	樊國	Ji (姬姓) Fan (樊氏)	Southeastern Chang'an District, Xi'an City, Shaanxi Province. Later moved to Jiyuan City, Henan Province	Bo	Reign of King Xuan–635 BCE	Jin
Dan	單國	Ji (姬姓) Dan (單氏)	Mei County, Shaanxi Province. Later moved eastward with the Zhou royal family to Southeastern Mengjin County, Henan Province.	Zi	Reign of King Wen–Spring and Autumn Period	Zhou dynasty
Shao	召國 (邵國)	Ji (姬姓) Shao (邵氏)	Southern Qishan County, Shaanxi Province	Gong	1046 BCE	
Liang	梁國	Ying (嬴姓) Liang (梁氏)	Weinan City, Shaanxi Province. Later moved to Shanxi Province	Bo	821–641 BCE	Qin
Mao	毛國	Ji (姬姓) Mao (毛氏)	Qishan County; Fufeng County, Shaanxi Province. Later moved to Yiyang County, Henan Province	Bo	1046 BCE	Qin
Bi	畢國	Ji (姬姓) Bi (畢氏)	Xianyang City, Shaanxi Province	Gong	1046 BCE	Xirong
Jing	井國	Jiang (姜姓) Jing (井氏)	Baoji City, Shaanxi Province	Bo		Wey
Zhou	周國	Ji (姬姓) Zhou (周氏)	Fengxiang County, Baoji City, Shaanxi Province	Gong	1046 BCE	
Wangshu	王叔國	Ji (姬姓)		Gong	Reign of King Xiang	
Wen	溫國	Ji (己姓) Su (蘇氏)	Southwestern Wen County, Henan Province	Zi	1046–650 BCE	Beidi
Liu	劉國	Ji (姬姓) Liu (劉氏)	Southwestern Fengshi Town, Yanshi City, Henan Province	Zi	712–455 BCE	Zhou dynasty
Rong	榮國	Ji (姬姓) Rong (榮氏)	Gongyi City, Henan Province	Gong	1046 BCE	
Gan	甘國	Ji (姬姓) Gan (甘氏)	Yuanyang County, Henan Province	Gong	Reign of King Xiang	
Yin	尹國	Ji (姞姓) Yin (尹氏)	Southeastern Xin'an County; northwestern Yiyang County, Henan Province	Gong	770–513 BCE	Jin
Gan	甘國	Ji (姬姓) Gan (甘氏)	Hu County, Shaanxi Province	Gong	Reign of King Wu	
Yuan	原國	Ji (姬姓) Yuan (原氏)	Jiyuan City, Henan Province	Gong	1046 BCE	Jin
Zhan	詹國	Ji (姬姓) Zhan (詹氏)		Hou	827 BCE	Chu
Gong	鞏國	Ji (姬姓) Gong (鞏氏)	Xikangdian Village, Xiaoyi Town, Gongyi City, Henan Province		516 BCE	Jin
Ying	應國	Ji (姬姓) Ying (應氏)	Pingdingshan City, Henan Province	Gong	1046 BCE	Chu
Da Luo	大駱國	Ying (嬴姓) Zhao (趙氏)		Gong		Xirong

=== States located in present Henan province ===
Name of state	Hanzi	Family	Present location	Title	Start and end year	Conqueror
Yin	殷國	Zi (子姓) Yin (殷氏)	Anyang City, Henan Province	Gong	1046–1040 BCE	Zhou dynasty
Wangshu	王叔國	Ji (姬姓)	Southwestern Mengjin County, Henan Province	Gong	Reign of King Xiang–563 BCE	
Wen	溫國	Ji (己姓) Su (蘇氏)	Southwestern Wen County, Henan Province	Zi	?–650 BCE	Beidi
Liu	劉國	Ji (姬姓) Liu (劉氏)	Southwestern Fengshi Town, Yanshi City, Henan Province	Zi	592 BCE–?	Zhou dynasty
Rong	榮國	Ji (姬姓) Rong (榮氏)	Gongyi City, Henan Province	Gong		
Gan	甘國	Ji (姬姓)Gan (甘氏)	Yuanyang County, Henan Province	Gong	Reign of King Xiang–?	
Yin	尹國	Ji (姞姓) Yin (尹氏)	Xin'an County, Henan Province	Gong		
Dan	單國	Ji (姬姓) Dan (單氏)	Southeastern Jiyuan City, Henan Province	Bo		Zhou dynasty
Gong	鞏國	Ji (姬姓) Gong (鞏氏)	Xikangdian Village, Xiaoyi Town, Gongyi City, Henan Province		?–516 BCE	Jin
Ying	應國	Ji (姬姓) Ying (應氏)	Pingdingshan City, Henan Province	Gong	1046 BCE–Mid-Spring and Autumn Period	Chu
Yuan	原國	Ji (姬姓) Yuan (原氏)	Jiyuan City, Henan Province	Gong	1046–563 BCE	Jin
Southern Yan	南燕國	Ji (姞姓) Yan (燕氏)	Northeastern Yanjin County, Henan Province	Bo	Shang Era–?	Zheng
Yan	鄢國		Northwestern Yanling County, Henan Province			Zheng
Mi	密國	Ji (姬姓)	Xinmi City, Henan Province			Zheng
Hu	胡國	Ji (姬姓) Hu (胡氏)	Yancheng District; Wuyang County, Luohe City, Henan Province		?–763 BCE	Zheng
Jiao	焦國	Ji (姬姓) Jiao (焦氏)	Western Sanmenxia City, Henan Province	Bo	1046–775 BCE	Western Guo
Gong	共國	Ji (姬姓)	Northwestern Huixian City, Henan Province (or Jingchuan County, Gansu Province)	Bo		Wey
Fan	凡國	Ji (姬姓)	Southwestern Huixian City, Henan Province	Bo	?–716 BCE	Northern Rong
Ge	葛國	Ying (嬴姓) Ge (葛氏)	Xiuwu County, Henan Province	Bo	Shang Era–?	Song
Eastern Guo	東虢國	Ji (姬姓) Guo (虢/郭氏)	Xingyang City, Henan Province	Possibly Bo or Hou	1046–767 BCE	Zheng
Qi	杞國	Si (姒姓) Qi (杞氏)	Qi County, Henan Province. Later moved to Changle County, Shandong Province, and then to Anqiu City, Shandong Province	Bo; Hou; Zi	Shang Era–445 BCE	Chu
Xie	謝國	Ren (任姓) Xie (謝氏)	Nanyang City, Henan Province	Hou	Shang Era–841 BCE	Zhou dynasty, Shen
Shen	申國	Jiang (姜姓) Shen (申氏)	Nanyang City, Henan Province	Hou	841–688/680 BCE	Chu
Lü	呂國	Jiang (姜姓) Lü (呂氏)	Nanyang City, Henan Province	Hou	Xia Era–688/680 BCE	Chu
Kuai	鄶國	Yun (妘姓)	Northeastern Xinmi City, Henan Province		?–769 BCE	Zheng
Dai	戴國	Zi (子姓) Dai (戴氏)	Lankao County, Henan Province	Gong	?–713 BCE	Zheng
Xi	息國 (鄎國)	Ji (姬姓)	Xi County, Henan Province	Hou	?–680 BCE	Chu
Huang	黃國	Ying (嬴姓) Huang (黃氏)	Huangchuan County, Henan Province	Zi	Shang Era–648 BCE	Chu
Liao	蓼國 (鄝國, 廖國, 飂國)	Ji (姬姓) Liao (廖氏)	Huyang Town, Tanghe County, Henan Province			Chu
Liao	蓼國 (繆國)	Yan (偃) Liao (繆氏)	Northeastern Gushi County, Henan Province	Hou	?–622 BCE	Chu
Pan	潘國 (番國)	Ji (姬姓) Pan (潘氏)	Xingyang City, Henan Province		1046–504 BCE	Chu
Guang (Note: This state's existence is tentatively linked by He Guangyue (何光岳) to a passage in a work by Wang Chong, and is not widely considered reliable.)	光國	Ji (己姓)	Huangchuan County; Guangshan County, Henan Province	Zi	?–7th century BCE	Chu
Bi	偪國	Ji (姞姓)				
Xian	弦國	Wei (隗姓) or Ji (姬姓)	Huangchuan County; Guangshan County, Henan Province	Zi	?–655 BCE	Chu
Hua	滑國	Ji (姬姓)	Southern Yanshi City, Henan Province	Bo	?–627 BCE	Qin
Jiang	江國	Ying (嬴姓) Jiang (江氏)	Zhengyang County; Xi County, Henan Province		1040–623 BCE	Chu
Yu	邘國	Ji (姬姓)	Beixiwan Town, Qinyang City, Henan Province (or Xi County, Shanxi Province)	Shu (叔)		Jin
Jiang	蔣國	Ji (姬姓) Jiang (蔣氏)	Jiangji Town, Gushi County, Henan Province	Bo	1040–617 BCE	Chu
Bei	邶國		Southeastern Tangyin County, Henan Province		11th century BCE–?	
Ji	祭國	Ji (姬姓)	Northeastern Zhengzhou City, Henan Province	Bo	1040–769 BCE	Zheng
Dao	道國		Queshan County or Xi County, Henan Province			Chu
Bai	柏國	Bai (柏氏)	Wuyang County; Xiping County, Henan Province	Zi		Chu
Zuo	胙國	Ji (姬姓)	Northern Yanjin County, Henan Province		1040 BCE–?	Zheng
Yong	雍國	Ji (姬姓) Yong (雍氏)	Xiuwu County, Henan Province		1046 BCE–?	Jin
Xiang	項國	Xiang (項氏)	Xiangcheng City, Henan Province		?–643 BCE	Lu
Dun	頓國		Xiangcheng City; Shangshui County, Henan Province	Zi	1046–496 BCE	Chu
Guan	管國	Ji (姬姓) Guan (管氏)	Zhengzhou City, Henan Province	Hou	1046–1040 BCE	Zhou dynasty
Tan	檀國		Jiyuan City, Henan Province	Bo		
Fang	房國	Qi (祁姓) Fang (房氏)	Suiping County, Henan Province	Zi	?–529 BCE	Chu
Shen	莘國		Northwestern Runan County, Henan Province			Cai
Xu	許國	Jiang (姜姓) Xu (許氏)	Xuchang City, Henan Province. Later moved to Ye County by Chu	Nan	1046–481 BCE	Chu
Wei	韋國	Ji (姬姓) Wei (韋氏)	Southeastern Hua County, Henan Province. Moved to Chengwu County, Shandong Province, and later Xuzhou City, Jiangsu Province	Bo	c. 11th century BCE–?	
Eastern Bugeng	東不羹國	Ying (赢姓)	Northern Wuyang County, Henan Province			Chu
Western Bugeng	西不羹國		Southeastern Xiangcheng County, Henan Province			Chu

=== In Shaanxi province ===
Name of state	Hanzi	Family	Present location	Title	Start and end year	Conqueror
Feng	酆國	Ji (姬姓)	Hu County, Shaanxi Province	Hou	1046–1023 BCE	Zhou dynasty
Fan	樊國	Ji (姬姓) Fan (樊氏)	Initially southeastern Chang'an District, Xi'an City, Shaanxi Province; later moved to Jiyuan City, Henan Province	Zhong (仲)	?–635 BCE	Jin
Zhou	周國	Ji (姬姓) Zhou (周氏)	Fengxiang County, Baoji City, Shaanxi Province	Gong	1046 BCE–?	
Shao	召國	Ji (姬姓) Shao (召氏)	Southern Qishan County, Shaanxi Province	Gong	1046 BCE–?	
Zhan	詹國	Ji (姬姓) Zhan (詹氏)	Unknown, possibly near Chang'an District, Xi'an City, Shaanxi Province	Bo	827 BCE–?	
Mao	毛國	Ji (姬姓) Mao (毛氏)	Qishan County; Fufeng County, Shaanxi Province. Later moved to Yiyang County, Henan Province	Bo	1046–516 BCE	Qin
Bi	畢國	Ji (姬姓) Bi (畢氏)	Xianyang City, Shaanxi Province	Gong	1046 BCE–Early Spring and Autumn Period	Xirong
Jing	井國	Jiang (姜姓) Jing (井氏)	Baoji City, Shaanxi Province	Bo		
Liang	梁國	Ying (嬴姓) Liang (梁氏)	Southern Hancheng City, Shaanxi Province	Bo	8th century BCE–641 BCE	Qin
Northern Rui	北芮國	Ji (姬姓) Rui (芮氏)	Liangdai Village, Hancheng City, Shaanxi Province	Bo	1046 BCE–640 BCE	Qin
Southern Rui	南芮國	Ji (姬姓) Rui (芮氏)	Chaoyi Town, Dali County, Shaanxi Province	Bo	806 BCE–?	Qin
Xiaoguo	小虢國	Ji (姬姓) Guo (虢/郭氏)	Eastern Baoji City, Shaanxi Province	Gong	Early Spring and Autumn Period–687 BCE	Qin
Chong	崇國	Chong (崇氏)	Eastern Huyi County, Shaanxi Province			
Han	韓國	Ji (姬姓) Han (韓氏)	Hancheng City, Shaanxi Province (or Gu'an County, Hebei Province)	Hou	?–757 BCE	Jin
Du	杜國	Qi (祁姓) Du (杜氏)	Southeastern Chang'an District, Xi'an City, Shaanxi Province	Bo		
Hao	郝國	Feng (風姓) Hao (郝氏)	Hao Village, Zu'an Town, Hu County, Shaanxi Province (or Hao Township, Taiyuan City, Shanxi Province)		11th century BCE–7th century BCE	Qin
Mixu	密須國	Ji (姞姓)	Lingtai County, Gansu Province		c. 21st century–10th century BCE	Zhou dynasty
Li	驪戎	Ji (姬姓)		Nan		Jin

=== In Shanxi province ===
Name of state	Hanzi	Family	Present location	Title	Start and end year	Conqueror
Western Guo (Southern Guo)	西虢國 (南虢國)	Ji (姬姓)	From Northeastern Pinglu County, Shanxi Province and Sanmenxia City, Henan Province, to Lingbao City, Henan Province; Western Tongguan County, Shaanxi Province, to Southern Lushi County, Henan Province	Gong	1046–655 BCE	Jin
Northern Guo (Eastern Guo)	北虢國 (東虢國)	Ji (姬姓)	Pinglu County, Shanxi Province	Possibly Bo or Hou	Early Spring and Autumn Period–655 BCE	Jin
Xun	荀國 (郇國)	Ji (姬姓) Xun (荀氏)	Northeastern Xinjiang County, Shanxi Province	Hou	1046 BCE – 7th century BCE	Jin
Ji	冀國	Qi (祁姓) Ji (冀氏)	Hejin City, Shanxi Province		1046 BCE–?	Jin
Dong	董國	Ji (己姓) Dong (董氏)	Eastern Wenxi County, near Dong Town and Liyuan town, Shanxi Province	Hou	ca. 21st century BCE–ca. 7th century BCE	Jin
Jia	賈國	Ji (姬姓) Jia (賈氏)	Eastern Xiangfen County, Shanxi Province (or Southwestern Rongcheng County, Hebei Province)	Bo	11th century BCE–678 BCE	Jin
Yang	楊國	Ji (姬姓) Yang (楊氏)	Southeastern Hongtong County, Shanxi Province	Hou	786 BCE–ca. 7th century BCE	Jin
Geng	耿國	Ji (姬姓) Geng (耿氏)	Hejin City, Shanxi Province		?–661 BCE	Jin
Wei	魏國	Ji (姬姓) Wei (魏氏)	Ruicheng County, Shanxi Province	Hou	?–661 BCE	Jin
Huo	霍國	Ji (姬姓)霍氏	Southwestern Huozhou City, Shanxi Province	Hou	1046–661 BCE	Jin
Yu	虞國	Ji (姬姓) Yu (虞氏)	Pinglu County, near Xia County, Shanxi Province	Gong	1046–655 BCE	Jin
Shen	沈國	Ji (姬姓)	Along the banks of Fen River in Shanxi Province			Jin
Si	姒國	Ji (姬姓)	Along the banks of Fen River in Shanxi Province			Jin
Ru	蓐國	Ji (姬姓)	Along the banks of Fen River in Shanxi Province			Jin
Huang	黃國	Ji (姬姓)	Along the banks of Fen River in Shanxi Province			Jin
Peng	倗國		Jiang County, Yuncheng City, Shanxi Province	Bo		Jin
Ba	霸國	Kui (媿姓) Ba (霸氏)	Yicheng County, Linfen City, Shanxi Province	Bo		Jin
Li	黎國	Qi (祁姓) Li (黎氏)	Northeastern Licheng County, Shanxi Province	Hou	? –604 BCE	Lushi
Dai	代國	Zi (子姓)	Northeastern Shanxi Province			Zhao

=== In Shandong Province ===
Name of State	Hanzi	Family	Present location	Title	Start and end year	Conqueror
Zhu (Zhuqi, Qi)	祝國 (祝其國、其國)	Ji (姬姓) Zhu (祝氏)	Northeastern Changqing District, Jinan City, Shandong Province		1046–768 BCE	Qi
Nie	聶國	Jiang (姜姓) Nie (聶氏)	Chiping District, Shandong Province			
Ji	紀國	Jiang (姜姓) Ji (紀氏)	Southern Shouguang City, Shandong Province	Hou	Shang Era–690 BCE	Qi
Yu	鄅國	Yun (妘姓) Yu (禹氏)	Lanling County, Linyi City, near Yinan County, Shandong Province	Zi		Lu
Zhu (Zou, Zhulou)	邾國 (鄒國、邾婁國)	Cao (曹姓) Zhu (朱氏)	Zoucheng City, Shandong Province	Zi	1046–281 BCE	Chu
Ju	莒國	Ji or Ying (己/嬴姓) Ju (莒氏)	Jiaozhou City; Ju County, Shandong Province	Zi	1046–431 BCE	Chu
Xiang	向國	Jiang (姜姓) Xiang (向氏)	Southwestern Ju County, Shandong Province	Zi	?–721 BCE	Ju
Ji	極國 (遽國)	Ji (姬姓) Ji (遽氏)	Southern Jinxiang County, Shandong Province		?–721 BCE	Lu
Shi	邿國 (詩國、寺國)	Ren (妊姓)	Southeastern Jining City, Shandong Province		?–560 BCE	Lu
Teng	滕國	Ji (姬姓) Teng (滕氏)	Tengzhou City, Shandong Province	Hou, or Zi	1046 BCE–297 BCE	Song
Xue	薛國	Ren (任姓) Xue (薛氏)	Tengzhou City, Shandong Province	Hou, Bo	Xia Era–298 BCE	Qi, Wei
Ni (Xiao Zhu / Xiao Zhulou)	郳國 (小邾國、小邾婁國)	Cao (曹姓) Ni or Yan (倪/颜氏)	Eastern Tengzhou City, Shandong Province	Zi	c. 20th century BCE (653 BCE as Xiao Zhu)–325 BCE	Chu
Lan	濫國	Cao (曹姓)	Yangzhuang Town, Tengzhou City, Shandong Province		643 BCE–510 BCE	Lu
Tan	郯國	Ji (己姓)	Southwestern Tancheng County, Shandong Province	Zi	?–414 BCE	Chu (or Yue)
Zhuan	鄟國		Northeastern Tancheng County, Shandong Province		?–585 BCE	Lu
Cheng	郕國 (成國、宬國)	Ji (姬姓) Cheng (成氏)	Northern Wenshang County, Shandong Province	Bo	1046 BCE–408 BCE	Qi, Lu (or Chu)
Su	宿國	Feng (風姓) Su (宿氏)	Southwestern Dongping County, Shandong Province	Nan	1046 BCE–684 BCE	Song
Tan	譚國	Si (姒姓) Tan (譚氏)	Jinan City, Shandong Province	Zi	1046 BCE–684 BCE	Qi
Sui	遂國	Gui (媯姓)	Northwestern Ningyang County, Shandong Province		Xia Era–681 BCE	Qi
Xuju	須句國	Feng (風姓)	Western Dongping County, Shandong Province	Zi	?–639 BCE	Zhu
Zeng	鄫國（繒國）	Si (姒姓) Zeng (曾氏)	Zaozhuang City, Shandong Province	Zi	Xia Era–567 BCE	Ju
Zhang	鄣國	Jiang (姜姓) Zhang (章氏)	Pingyin County, Shandong Province		?–664 BCE	Qi
Chunyu (Zhou)	淳于國 (州國)	Jiang (姜姓) Chunyu (淳于氏)	Northeastern Anqiu City, Shandong Province	Gong	1046 BCE–?	Qi (杞國)
Gao	郜國	Ji (姬姓) Gao (郜氏)	Southeastern Chengwu County, Shandong Province	Zi	1046 BCE–Early Spring and Autumn Period	Song
Mao	茅國	Ji (姬姓) Mao (茅氏)	Jinxiang County, Shandong Province	Bo	1046 BCE–?	Zhu
Ren	任國	Feng (風姓) Ren (任氏)	Jining City, Shandong Province			Qi
Pi	邳國	Ren (任姓) Xue (薛氏)	Southern Tengzhou City, Shandong Province; Northeastern Pizhou City, Jiangsu Province	Bo, Hou	Xia Era–?	Chu
Mou	牟國	Mou (牟氏)	Laiwu City, Shandong Province	Zi		Lu
Genmou	根牟國	Jiang (姜姓)	Lingquan Town, Junan County, Shandong Province		1046–600 BCE	Lu
Yu Yuqiu (Yu Qiu)	於餘邱國 (餘邱國)		Linshu County, Shandong Province			
Biyang (Fuyang)	偪陽國 (傅陽國)	Yun (妘姓)	Zaozhuang City, Shandong Province	Zi	?–563 BCE	Jin, Lu, Qi, Song, Wey, Cao
Guo	郭國	Ren (任姓) Guo (郭氏)	Northeastern Dongchangfu District, Liaocheng City, Shandong Province	Bo (Demoted to Zi under the Shang Dynasty)	?–670 BCE	Qi
Zhuanyu	顓臾國	Feng (風姓)	Pingyi County, Shandong Province			Qin
Zhu	鑄國	Qi (祁姓)	Feicheng City, bordering Ningyang County, Shandong Province			Qi
Yang	陽國	Ji (姬姓) Yang (陽氏)	Yishui County, Shandong Province	Hou	?–660 BCE	Qi
Fei	費國	Ji (季姓) Fei (費氏)	Cao County, Shandong Province			Chu
Zhu	諸國	Si or Peng (姒/彭姓) Zhu (諸氏)	Zhucheng City; Anqiu City, Shandong Province			
Jie	介國	Yun (妘姓)	Qingdao City, Shandong Province (or north of Xiao County, Anhui Province)			
Kan	闞國	Kan (闞氏)	Northern Jiaxiang County, Shandong Province			
Guo	過國	Ren (任姓) Han (寒氏)	Laizhou City, Yantai City, Shandong Province		Xia Era–?	
Lai (Laiyi)	萊國 (萊夷國)		Southeastern Longkou City, Shandong Province	Hou, Gong	?–567 BCE	Qi
Rong	戎國		Cao County, Shandong Province			Qi
Mie	蔑國		Sishui County, Shandong Province			Lu

=== In Hubei Province ===
Name of state	Hanzi	Family	Present location	Title	Start and end year	Conqueror
Ruo	鄀國		Neixiang County, Henan Province; Later moved to Southeastern Yicheng City, Hubei Province	Zi		Chu
Zhen	軫國	Yan (偃姓)	Western Yingcheng City, Hubei Province			Chu
E	鄂國	Ji (姞姓) E (鄂氏)	Anju Town, Suizhou City, Hubei Province	Hou	Shang Era–863 BCE	Chu
Zeng	曾國 (隨國)	Ji (姬姓) Zeng (曾氏)	Suizhou City, Hubei Province	Hou		Chu
Kui	夔國 (隗國，歸國)	Mi (羋姓) Xiong (熊氏)	Zigui County, Hubei Province	Zi (Self-styled Wang)	?–634 BCE	Chu
Luo	羅國	Mi (羋姓) Luo (羅氏)	Yicheng City, Hubei Province	Zi	Shang Era–690 BCE	Chu
Deng	鄧國	Man (曼姓) Deng (鄧氏)	Northern Xiangyang City, Hubei Province (or Dengzhou City, Henan Province)	Hou	Shang Era–678 BCE	Chu
Quan	權國	Zi or Mi (子/羋姓) Quan (權氏)	Shayang County, Jingmen City, Hubei Province	Gong	12th century BCE–7th century BCE	Chu
Yun	鄖國	Ying, Yun, or Ji (嬴/妘/姬姓)	Anlu City, Hubei Province	Zi		Chu
Jiao	絞國	Yan (偃姓)	Northwestern Yunyang District, Shiyan City, Hubei Province			Chu
Lai (Li)	賴國 (厲國)	Jiang (姜姓) Lai (賴氏)	Northeastern Suizhou City, Hubei Province (alternatively Luyi County, or Shangcheng County, Henan Province)		?–581 BCE	Chu
You	鄾國	Man (曼姓)	Zhangwan Subdistrict, Xiangzhou District, Xiangyang City, Hubei Province	Zi		Chu
Lin	廩國					Chu
Gu	穀國	Ying (嬴姓) Gu (谷氏)	Northwestern Gucheng County, Hubei Province	Bo	?–ca. 20th century BCE	Chu
Er	貳國		Guangshui City, Hubei Province			Chu
Zhou (Xizhou)	州國 (西州國)	Yan (偃姓)	Jianli City, Hubei Province	Gong		Chu
Yong	庸國 (鄘國)		Shangyong Town, Zhushan County, Hubei Province		?–611 BCE	Chu, Qin, Ba
Qun	麇國		Yunyang County, Hubei Province	Zi	?–611 BCE	Chu
Tang	唐國	Qi (祁姓) Tang (唐氏)	Sui County; Zaoyang City, Hubei Province	Hou	?–505 BCE	Chu
Dan	聃國	Ji (姬姓)	Jingmen City, Hubei Province (Alternatively Fuyang City, Anhui Province)		1040 BCE–LateWestern Zhou	Chu
Lu (Lurong)	盧國 (盧戎國)	Gui (媯姓) Lu (盧氏)	Xiangyang City, Hubei Province	Zi	? –690 BCE	Chu
Yin	陰國		Laohekou City, Hubei Province		?–532 BCE	Chu
Western Huang	西黃國		East of the Han River; Southeast of Yicheng City, Hubei Province (or Sichuan Province)		?–ca. 7th century BCE	Chu

=== In Chongqing ===
Name of state	Hanzi	Family	Present location	Title	Start and end year	Conqueror
Yu	魷國 (魚國)	Er	Yufu (now Baidicheng)	Bo	?–612 BCE	Chu
Ba	巴國	Ji (姬姓)	Chongqing and part of eastern Sichuan Province	Zi	1046–316 BCE	Qin

=== In Sichuan Province ===
Name of state	Hanzi	Family	Present location	Title	Start and end year	Conqueror
Shu	蜀國	Du (杜姓) Kaiming (开明氏)	Sichuan Province	Non–Zhou kingdom coinciding with this period. Monarchs bearing the title of emperor.	?–316 BCE	Qin

=== In Anhui Province ===
Name of state	Hanzi	Family	Present location	Title	Start and end year	Conqueror
Shen	沈國	Ji (姬姓) Shen (沈氏)	Pingyu County, Henan Province; Gucheng Village, Sheqiao Town, Linquan County, Anhui Province	Zi	1040–506 BCE	Cai
Liu (Lu)	六國 (錄國)	Yan (偃姓)	Northern Lu'an City, Anhui Province	Bo	1046–622 BCE	Chu
Ying	英國	Yan (偃姓) Ying (英氏)	Lu'an City, Anhui Province		1046–646 BCE	Chu
Tong	桐國	Yan (偃姓)	Tongcheng City, Anhui Province			Chu
Yang	養國	Ying (嬴姓)	Yangqiao Town, Linquan County, Anhui Province	Bo	? –528 BCE	Chu
Xiao	蕭國	Zi (子姓) Xiao (蕭氏)	Northwestern Xiao County, Anhui Province	Hou	?–579 BCE	Chu
Shu	舒國	Yan (偃姓) Shu (舒氏)	Shucheng County, Anhui Province	Zi	1046–657 BCE	Xu
Shuyong	舒庸國	Yan (偃姓)	Shucheng County, Anhui Province		1046–574 BCE	Chu
Shujiu	舒鳩國	Yan (偃姓)	Shucheng County, Anhui Province		1046–548 BCE	Chu
Shuliao (Liao)	舒蓼國 (蓼國)	Yan (偃姓)	Gushi County, Henan Province; Huoqiu County, Anhui Province		1046–601 BCE	Chu
Shulong	舒龍國	Yan (偃姓)			1046 BCE–	Chu
Shugong	舒龔國	Yan (偃姓)			1046 BCE–	Chu
Shubao	舒鮑國	Yan (偃姓)			1046 BCE–	Chu
Zong	宗國	Yan (偃姓) Zong (宗氏)	Shucheng County, Lujiang County, Anhui Province			Chu
Chao	巢國	Yan (偃姓) Chao (巢氏)	Chaohu City, Anhui Province	Bo	? –518 BCE	Wu
Wan	皖國	Yan or Xia (偃/夏姓)	Qianshan City, Anhui Province	Bo	1046 BCE–?	Chu
Lu	廬國		Hefei City, Anhui Province	Zi	1046 BCE–?	Chu
Zhongli	鍾離國	Ying (嬴姓) Zhongli (鍾離氏)	Fengyang County, Anhui Province	Zi		Chu
Zhoulai	州來國		Fengtai County, Anhui Province			Chu
Nanhu	南胡國	Gui (媯姓) Hu (胡氏)	Fuyang City, Anhui Province	Zi	? –496 BCE	Chu

=== In Jiangsu Province ===
Name of state	Hanzi	Family	Present location	Title	Start and end year	Conqueror
Han	邗國		Southeastern Yangzhou City, Jiangsu Province		1046 BCE–?	
Zhongwu	鍾吾國		Suqian City, Jiangsu Province	Zi	?–518 BCE	Wu
Peng	彭國	Peng (彭氏)	Xuzhou City, Jiangsu Province			
Xu	徐國	Ying (嬴姓) Xu (徐氏)	Tancheng County, Shandong Province; Xuzhou City, Jiangsu Province	Hou, Zi (Self-styled Wang)	?–512 BCE	Wu
Yan	奄國		Wujin District, Changzhou City, Jiangsu Province		Early Spring and Autumn Period–?	Wu

=== In Hebei Province ===
Name of state	Hanzi	Family	Present location	Title	Start and end year	Conqueror
Fei	肥國		Gaocheng District, Hebei Province		?–530 BCE	Jin
Gu	鼓國	Ji (姬姓)	Western Jinzhou City, Hebei Province		?–521 BCE	Jin
Xing	邢國	Ji (姬姓) Xing (邢氏)	Xingtai City, Hebei Province	Hou	1040–635 BCE	Wey, Jin
Dai	代國	Zi (子姓)	Northwest Hebei Province			Zhao

=== In Liaoning Province ===
Name of state	Hanzi	Family	Present location	Title	Start and end year	Conqueror
Guzhu	孤竹國	Zi (子姓) Guzhu (孤竹氏)	Southwestern Chaoyang City, Liaoning Province	Hou	Start of the Shang Dynasty–664 BCE	Yan, Qi

=== In Korean Peninsula ===
Name of state	Hanzi	Family	Present location	Title	Start and end year	Conqueror
Ji (Gija Joseon)	箕國 (箕氏朝鮮)	Zi (子姓)	Northern Korean Peninsula	Hou	Start of the Zhou Dynasty–Start of the Han Dynasty	Wiman Joseon

=== Tribes or states outside the vassalage of the Zhou Dynasty ===
Name of state	Hanzi	Family	Present location	Title	Start and end year	Conqueror
Xianyu	鮮虞國	Ji (姬姓)			?–506 BCE (Restored as Zhongshan)	Jin
Yiqu	義渠國	Yiqu (義渠)			Shang Era–272 BCE	Qin
Yanjing Rong	燕京戎		Jingle County, Qi County, Jiexiu City, Shanxi Province			Zhou dynasty
Mianzhu	綿諸國					Qin
Shanrong	山戎					Qi
Luhun Rong	陸渾戎				? –525 BCE	Jin
Yiluo Rong	伊洛戎					Han, Wei
Quanrong	犬戎					Qin
Xirong	西戎					Qin
Rongman (Manshi)	戎蠻（蠻氏、曼氏）		Southeastern Ruyang County, Southwestern Ruzhou County, Henan Province	Zi	?–491 BCE	Chu
Baidi	白狄	Ji (姬姓)				Jin
Chidi	赤狄					Jin
Changdi	長狄	Qi (漆姓)				Jin
Chou You	仇由				?–5th century BCE	Jin
Jiashi	甲氏	Kui (媿姓)			?–593 BCE	Jin
Duo Chen	鐸辰	Kui (媿姓)			?–593 BCE	Jin
Liuxu	留吁	Kui (媿姓)			?–593 BCE	Jin
Qiang Gao Ru	嗇咎如	Kui (媿姓)			?–588 BCE	Jin
Lushi (Dongshan Gaoluo clan)	潞氏（東山皋落氏）	Kui (媿姓)	Northeastern Lucheng District, Shanxi Province	Zi	604 BCE–594 BCE	Jin
Maorong	茅戎					Jin
Souman	鄋瞞				?–594 BCE	Jin
Wuzhong	無終國					Qi
Lingzhi	令支國					Yan

== States during the Warring States period (403 BCE – 221 BCE) ==
=== Main States ===
Name of state	Hanzi	Family	Present location	Title	Start and end year	Conqueror
Qin	秦國	Ying (嬴姓) Zhao(趙氏)	Central and southern Shaanxi Province, eastern Gansu Province, Sichuan Province, Chongqing City, western Henan Province, western Hubei Province. Unified China in 221 BCE.	Zhong and Bo (conferred in 770 BCE); Wang (self-proclaimed from 325 BCE); Emperor (in 288 BCE, called the "emperor" of the west, respected Qi as the "emperor" of the east, later abolished); Emperor of China (renamed after the unification of the country in 221 BCE)	770–206 BCE	Western Chu
Yan	燕國	Ji (姬姓) Yan (燕氏)	Southern Liaoning Province, Beijing City, Tianjin City, northern Hebei Province	Hou, Wang (Self-Proclaimed, 323 BCE)	1046–221 BCE	Qin
Chu	楚國	Mi (芈姓) Xiong (熊氏)	Hubei Province, northern Hunan Province, western Anhui Province, western Jiangxi Province, southern Henan Province; later expanded to Jiangsu Province and Zhejiang Province	Zi, Wang (Self-proclaimed, 704 BCE)	Before 1046 BCE–223 BCE	Qin
Zhao	趙國	Ying (嬴姓) Zhao (趙氏)	Western Hebei Province, northern Shanxi Province, and southern Inner Mongolia Autonomous Region	Hou, Wang (Self-proclaimed, 296 BCE)	403–222 BCE	Qin
Wei	魏國	Ji (姬姓) Wei (魏氏)	Southern Shanxi Province, northern Henan Province, eastern Shaanxi Province, and parts of Hebei Province	Hou, Wang (Self-proclaimed, 344 BCE)	403–225 BCE	Qin
Han	韓國	Ji (姬姓) Han (韓氏)	Henan Province	Hou, Wang (Self-proclaimed, 324 BCE)	403–230 BCE	Qin
Qi, historically known as Tian Qi	齊國	Gui (媯姓) Tian (田氏)	Eastern Shandong Province; southern Hebei Province	Hou, Wang (Self-proclaimed, 334 BCE)	386–221 BCE	Qin

=== Other States ===
Name of state	Hanzi	Family	Present location	Title	Start and end year	Conqueror
Eastern Zhou	東周國	Ji (姬姓)	Southwestern Gongyi City, Henan Province	Gong (公)	367–249 BCE	Qin
Western Zhou	西周國	Ji (姬姓)	Luoyang City, Henan Province	Gong (公)	440–256 BCE	Qin
Qi, historically known as Jiang Qi	齊國	Jiang (姜姓) Lü (吕氏)	Eastern Shandong Province, Southern Hebei Province	Hou	1046–379 BCE	Tian Clan
Lu	魯國	Ji (姬姓) Lu (魯氏)	Qufu City, Shandong Province	Hou	1046–256 BCE	Chu
Cai	蔡國	Ji (姬姓) Cai (蔡氏)	Xincai County; Shangcai County, Henan Province	Hou	1046–447 BCE	Chu
Wey	衞國	Ji (姬姓)Wey (衞氏)	Qi County; Puyang City, Henan Province	Hou, Jun (After 330 BCE)	1040–209 BCE	Qin
Song	宋國	Zi (子姓) Song (宋氏), Zi (子姓) Dai (戴氏)	Shangqiu City; Tongxu County, Henan Province	Gong, Wang (Self-proclaimed 323 BCE)	1040–286 BCE	Qi, Wei, Chu
Jin	晉國	Ji (姬姓) Jin (晉氏)	Shanxi Province, Northern Henan Province, Eastern Shaanxi Province, Eastern Hebei Province	Hou	1033–349 BCE	Han, Zhao, Wei (Partition of Jin)
Yue	越國	Si (姒姓)	Zhejiang Province, formerly reached southern Shandong Province and northern Fujian Province	Zi, Wang (Self-styled)	2032–222 BCE	Qin
Zheng	鄭國	Ji (姬姓) Zheng 鄭氏	Xinzheng City, Henan Province	Bo	806–375 BCE	Han
Qi	杞國	Si (姒姓) Qi (杞氏)	Qi County, Kaifeng City, Henan Province	Bo	1046–445 BCE	Chu
Zhu (Zou)	邾國（鄒國）	Cao (曹姓) Zhu (朱氏)	Zoucheng City, Shandong Province	Zi	1046–281 BCE	Chu
Xue	薛國	Ren (任姓) Xue (薛氏)	Zaozhuang City, Shandong Province	Hou	Xia Era–298 BCE	Qi, Wei
Ni (Xiao Zhu / Xiao Zhulou)	郳國 (小邾國, 小邾婁國)	Cao (曹姓) Ni or Yan (倪/颜氏)	Eastern Tengzhou City, Shandong Province	Zi	c. 8th century BCE (653 BCE as Xiao Zhu)–325 BCE	Chu
Teng	滕國	Ji (姬姓) Teng (滕氏)	Tengzhou City, Shandong Province	Hou or Zi	1046–297 BCE	Song
Ju	莒國	Ji or Ying (己/嬴姓) Ju (莒氏)	Ju County, Shandong Province	Zi	1046–431 BCE	Chu
Ren	任國	Feng (風姓) Ren (任氏)	Jining City, Shandong Province			Lu
Tan	郯國	Ji (己姓)	Southwestern Tancheng County, Shandong Province	Zi	?–414 BCE	Chu (or Yue)
Fei	費國	Ji (季姓) Fei (費氏)	Fei County, Shandong Province			Lu
Pi	邳國	Ren (任姓) Xue (薛氏)	Pizhou City, Jiangsu Province		Xia Era–?	Chu
Zhongshan	中山國	Ji (姬姓)	Eastern foothills of the Taihang Mountains, Central Hebei Province	Wang (Self-Proclaimed, 323 BCE)	?–296 BCE	Wei, Zhao
Shu	蜀國	Du (杜姓) Kaiming (开明氏)	Central Sichuan Province	Non-Zhou kingdom coinciding with this period. Later monarchs bore the title of Di, emperor, (帝).	?–316 BCE	Qin
Ba	巴國	Ji (姬姓)	Chongqing City and parts of eastern Sichuan Province	Zi	?–316 BCE	Qin
Ju	苴國		Guangyuan City, Sichuan Province	Hou (Title granted by Shu)	368 BCE–316 BCE	Qin
Anling	安陵國	Ji (姬姓)	Northwestern Yanling County, Henan Province	Jun (君)		Qin
Fulou	縛婁國		Huizhou City, Guangdong Province			Qin?
Yangyu	陽禺國		Qingyuan City, Guangdong Province			Qin?

== See also ==
- Ancient Chinese states
- List of Shang dynasty states
