= Yíng =

Ying
- Language: Chinese

Origin
- Language: Old Chinese
- Derivation: Shaohao (少昊); Gaoyao (皋陶); Boyi (伯益); Gaoyang (高揚); Feizi (非子); Ying Zheng (嬴政)
- Meaning: Be Full (嬴)

Other names
- Variant form: Young/Yong/Yang/Wang
- Cognates: Jin (Chinese surname); Jin (Korean surname); Qin (surname); Xu (surname); Zhao (surname)
- Derivative: Ing/In/Yin
- See also: Qin (state); Southern Qi; Northern Qi; Former Qin

Yíng (Chinese: 嬴) is an ancient Chinese surname. It was the noble house name of the Qin state during the Eastern Zhou dynasty, and the royal name of the subsequent Qin dynasty. Yíng Zheng was the first emperor of the unified Chinese empire.

Ying was one of the "Eight Great Xings of High Antiquity" (上古八大姓), along with Jī (姬), Yáo (姚), Sì (姒), Yún (妘), Gui (媯) and Rèn (妊), though some sources quote Jí (姞) as the last one instead of Rèn. Of these xings, only Jiang and Yao have survived in their original form to modern days as frequently occurring surnames, while Ji can still be seen occasionally. In the present day, the Ying surname is shared by less than 1000 people in mainland China, and is overall the 1520th-most common surname. In 2019, it was found that only exactly two people in Taiwan still had this surname.

There are however 14 clan names in China derived from the same ancestral name Yíng. Zhao, one of the most common Chinese surnames, is one such kind of cadet surnames that descended from the Yíng name.

== The origin of Yíng family ==
Ying is the surname of Shaohao (少皞). Shaohao had a child, Gaoyao (皋陶). Gaoyao had a child, Boyi (伯益). Boyi (伯益) was in charge of flood control and got the surname Yíng (嬴), which means 'bountiful,' in the early Xia dynasty. Yu the Great granted state of Dengfeng to the son of Boyi (伯益). This became the State of Yíng (英). Other children of Boyi (伯益) became the feudal lord of Liu state (六), and Xu state (徐), by order of Yu the Great. Later, the Yíng (赢) tribe was founded in the state of Yíng (英), and the Liu (六) in, Xu (徐) in Henan.

The Yíng tribe were powerful feudal lords at the end of the Shang dynasty period. Feilian (蜚廉) of the Yíng (皋) family was the General and feudal lord under Di Xin. After the fall of the Shang dynasty, the Yíng tribe moved to today Shanxi and Gansu.

The Yíng (皋) family's Feizi (非子, Biza) received Qin County (秦邑) in Shanxi from King Xiao of Zhou, thereby beginning the Qin dynasty lineage.

The Bai people, of the old Chinese Yíng, the Xu people, the Qiang people, and some nomad tribes were found in the area of the Qin (state). Also, in the Qin (state), at the time of Duke Mu of Qin, the Xirong people joined the Qin (state), by way of service in/with the army of Qin (state). The Yíng royal family of Qin (state) got various surnames from many surname of their Citizens.

From the time of Duke Zhuang of Qin, Longxi County in Gansu and the surrounding territory was part of the Qin (state). It merged into the territory of the Xiongnu, after the fall of the Qin dynasty; although citizens of the Yíng family remained in Longxi of Gansu.

== Evolution of the Yíng clan ==
Hata clan (秦氏) – Japan
太秦公, 秦長連, 秦野, 秦人, 秦川, 秦上, 秦下, 秦內, 秦井, 秦多, 秦當, 秦佐,秦冠, 秦前, 秦黨, 秦原, 秦部, 秦許, 秦常, 秦勝, 秦人部, 秦川邊, 秦大藏, 秦小宅, 秦井手, 秦中家, 秦田村, 秦長田, 秦物集, 秦泉寺, 秦高橋, 秦達布, 秦佐此佐...
Qin clan (秦氏), other Qin clans
Liang clan (梁氏)
Yíng ancestral（嬴姓）– royal house of Qin (state), imperial house of Qin dynasty
Zhao clan (趙氏) - imperial house of Song dynasty
Zhao clan (趙氏) – royal house of Qin dynasty
Other Zhao clans
Bó clan (伯氏)
The clans of Lian (廉), Xu (徐), Jiang (江), Huang (黄), Ma (馬), Ge (葛), Gu (谷), Miào (繆), Zhong (鍾), Fei (費), and Qu (瞿)

== Surname, Yíng ==
- Yíng (surname) (嬴) from Boyi the founder of Yíng (state) (英國)
- Jin (surname) (金) from Shaohao, Original only
- Qi (surname) (祁) from Shaohao
- Xu (surname) (徐) of Qin (state)
- Li Surname (里) from Gaoyao
- Li Surname (理) from Gaoyao
- Li (surname) (李) from Li Shiji (李世勣) the Xu Shiji (徐世勣)
- Gao (surname) (高) from Xu (surname) (徐)
- Yan (surname) (嚴) of Qin dynasty
- Zhang (surname) (張) from Zhang Yi, Original only
- Qin (surname) (秦) of Qin dynasty
- Feng (surname) (奉)
- Xiao (surname) (蕭)
- Fei (surname) (费)
- Pei (surname) (裴)
- Jiang (surname) (江) from Boyi (伯益), Henan based
- Zhao (surname) (赵) from Gaoyang (高揚)
- Gao (surname) (高) from two syllable surname Gaoyang (高揚)
- Cao (surname) (曹) from Gaoyang (高揚)
- Zhu (surname) (朱) from Gaoyang (高揚), Original only
- Qian (surname) (錢) from Gaoyang (高揚)
- Yu (surname) (玉) from the Gaoyang (高揚)
- Dong (surname) (董) from Gaoyang (高揚)
- Liang (surname) (梁) the common Yang
- Huang (surname) (黃) from Boyi (伯益)
- Yang (surname) (楊)
- Ma (surname) (马)
- Ge (surname) (葛)
- Gu (surname) (谷)
- Miào (surname) (缪)
- Zhong (surname) (钟)
- Qu (surname) (瞿)
- Ji (surname) (池)

== See also ==
- Feizi
- Feilian
