= Sì (surname) =

Si (姒)
- Language: Chinese

Origin
- Language: Old Chinese
- Derivation: Emperor Yao (堯); Yu the Great (禹)
- Meaning: East and West

Other names
- Variant forms: Sa, Sha, Xia, Ha
- Derivatives: Shi, Xi, Ci
- See also: Xia dynasty

Si (Chinese: 姒; pinyin: sì) was a Chinese surname during the Xia dynasty. According to Records of the Grand Historian, the surname of the Xia dynasty ruler was Si (姒). In general, the Chinese hold Xia founder Yu the Great (禹) to be a descendant of Emperor Yao (堯). It is one of the traditional description was what were known as the "Eight Great Xings of High Antiquity" (上古八大姓), along with Jiāng (姜), Jī (姬), Yáo (姚), Yíng (嬴), Yún (妘), Guī (媯) and Rèn (妊), though some sources quote Jí (姞) as the last one instead of Rèn. Of these xing, only Jiang and Yao have survived in their original form to modern days as frequently occurring surnames. The Song dynasty-era Hundred Family Surnames poem does not have Si. Although it exists in the modern day, only an estimated 2000 people in mainland China today share the name.

== Surnames during the Xia ==
- Xia (surname) (夏) from Yu the Great
- Yu (surname) (禹) from Yu the Great
- Liu (surname) (劉) from Yu the Great
- Xin (surname) (辛) from Yu the Great
- Guo (surname) (郭) from Yu the Great
- Deng (surname) (鄧) from Yu the Great
- Bian (surname) (卞) from Yu the Great
- Nan (surname) (南) from Yu the Great
- Tong (surname) (佟) from Jie of Xia
- Táng (surname) (唐) from Emperor Yao
- Tao (surname) (陶) from Emperor Yao
- Pan (surname) (范) from Emperor Yao
- Chen (surname) (谌) from Emperor Yao
- Guan (surname) (灌) from Emperor Yao
- Qi (surname) (祁) from Emperor Yao
- Li (surname) (黎) from Emperor Yao

== Notable people ==
- Bao Si (c. 792 BC–c. 771 BC), Chinese concubine
- Kong Jia, ruler of the Xia dynasty
- Shao Kang, king of the Xia dynasty
- Tai Si (c. 12th–11th century BC), Chinese noblewoman

== See also ==
- Feng (surname)
- Zi (surname)
- Gui (surname)
- Yíng (Chinese surname)
- Xiong (surname)
- Liu (surname)
- Si (Xing)
