= Ji (surname) =

Family name

Ji is the pinyin romanization of a number of distinct Chinese surnames that are written with different characters in Chinese. Depending on the character, it may be spelled Jī, Jí, Jǐ, or Jì by when tone diacritics are used. In Wade–Giles they are romanized as Chi. Languages using the Latin alphabet do not distinguish among the different Chinese surnames, rendering them all as Ji or Chi. They are not to be confused with the Chinese surname Chi (池); e.g. family name of Wuhan author Chi Li.

== Surnames romanized as Ji ==
=== Ancient clan names ===
- Jī 姬 (first tone), Gei or Kei in Cantonese, the royal surname of the Zhou dynasty, the 207th most common surname in modern China
- Jí 姞 (second tone), Gat or Kat in Cantonese, the royal surname of the states of Southern Yan (南燕), Mixu (密须), and Bi (偪)
- Jǐ 己 (third tone), Gei or Kei in Cantonese, the royal surname of the states of Ju, Tan (郯), and Wen (温)

=== Other surnames ===
- Jǐ (or Jì) 紀/纪 (third tone (or fourth tone)), Gei or Kei in Cantonese, the 122nd most common surname in China
- Jì 季 (fourth tone), Gwai or Kwai in Cantonese, the 142nd most common surname in China
- Jí 吉 (second tone), Gat or Kat in Cantonese, the 195th most common surname in China
- Jì 冀 (fourth tone), Kei in Cantonese, the 294th most common surname in China
- Jī 嵇 (first tone), Kai in Cantonese
- Jì 计/計 (fourth tone), Gai or Kai in Cantonese
- Jì 蓟/薊 (fourth tone), Gai or Kai in Cantonese
- Jì 暨 (fourth tone), Kei in Cantonese
- Jí 汲 (second tone), Kap in Cantonese
- Jí 籍 (second tone), Zik in Cantonese

== See also ==
- Ji (Korean name)
- Chi (surname)
