= Kong (surname) =

Kong (孔)
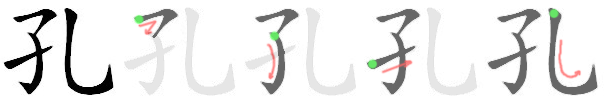
- The stroke order of 孔
- Language: Chinese

Origin
- Language: Old Chinese
- Origin: 子, 乙
- Derivation: Fusion of 子 and 乙

Other names
- Variant forms: Kung (Taiwan); Hung (Hong Kong); Khổng (Vietnam); Gong (Korea)

Kong (Chinese: 孔; Korean: 공) is a Chinese and Korean surname. It can also be written as Kung in Taiwan, Hung in Hong Kong, Khổng in Vietnam, and Gong in Korea. There are around 2.1 million people with this surname in China in 2002, representing 0.23% of the population. In 2024, it was the 98th-most common surname in China. It is the 25th name in the Hundred Family Surnames poem.

Kong is most notable as the surname of Confucius and his descendants, whose family tree is the world's longest, covering over 2,500 years and more than 80 generations, in two million entries as of 2009. The main line of descent traditionally held the title of Duke Yansheng, which was changed to the title of the first Sacrificial Official to Confucius in the 20th century. This title is currently held by Kong Tsui-chang.

Kong may also be the English transliteration of a rare Chinese surname 空, or a less common form of the Gong surnames such as 龔, 貢 and 弓.

== Origin ==
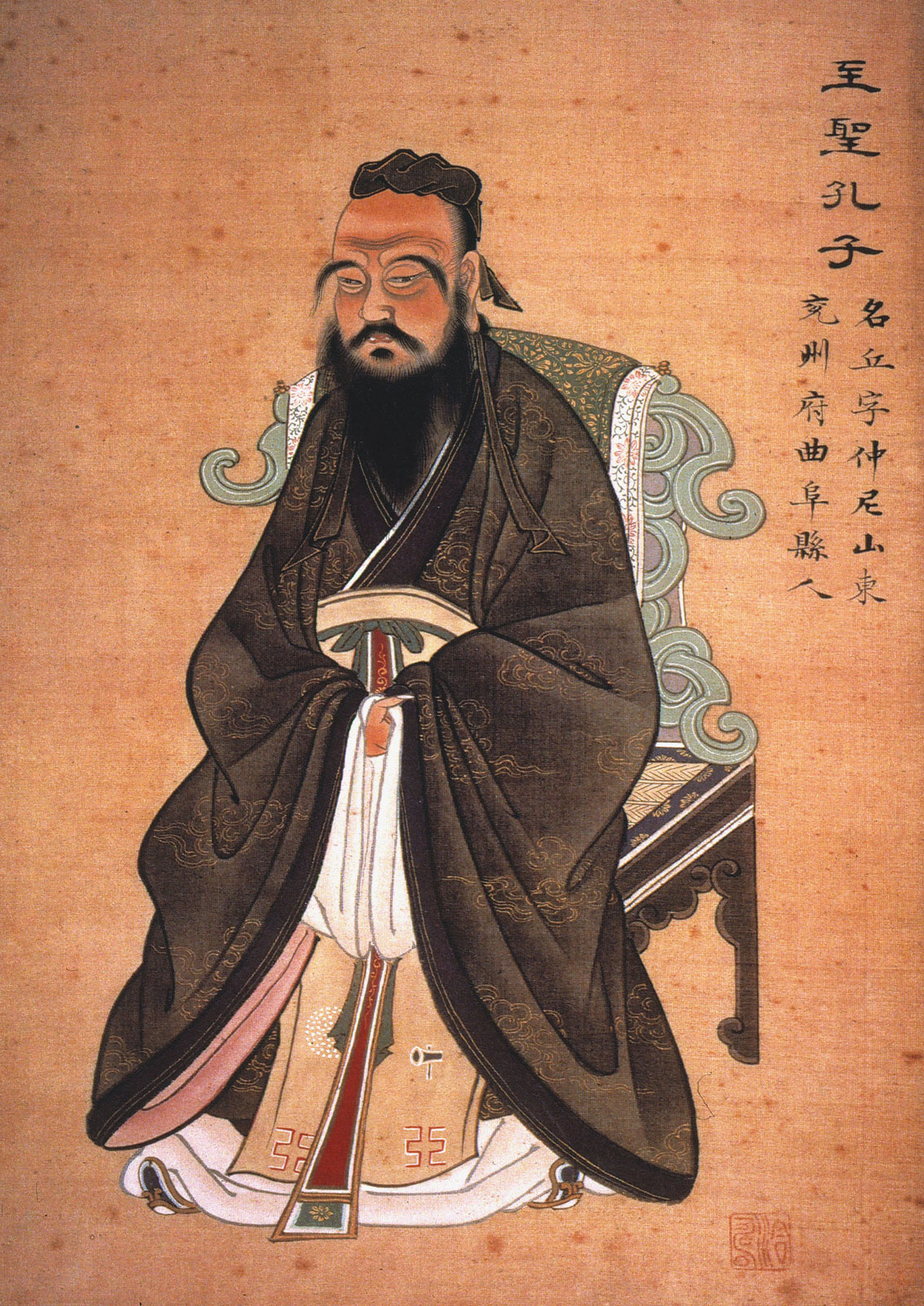
Portrait of Confucius

The character for the Kong surname was derived from the Zi (子) family name. The founder of the Shang dynasty, Tang of Shang whose family name was Zi, had the temple name of Taiyi (太乙). His descendants fused the character Zi (子) to Yi (乙), forming the character Kong (孔) which eventually became a surname. It first appeared during the Zhou dynasty as the courtesy name Kongfu (孔父) of a noble in the State of Song named Jia (嘉), said to be a descendant of the Tang of Shang. Kongfu Jia was murdered, and his son escaped to the State of Lu where he adopted Kong as the name of his clan. His family settled in Qufu and Confucius was one of his descendants.

The Kong surname may also have originated from a number of other sources. Others had adopted Kong as their surname because it was part of their ancestors' name. For example, in the State of Zheng, two of Duke Mu of Zheng's (鄭穆公) sons (surname Ji) (姬), had Shikong (士孔) and Zikong (子孔) as their respective courtesy names, and their descendants took Kong as their surname. Similarly, there was a noble in the State of Chen named Kongning (孔寧, originally of surname Gui (媯)), and another in the State of Qi named Konghui (孔虺, originally of surname Jiang (姜)); the descendants of both also adopted the surname Kong.

Some of the non-Han Chinese people used Kong as their surname, such as the Derung, Jingpo, Tibetan, and the Yugur people. Various Manchu clans also simplified their surnames to Kong.

== Notable bearers ==
- Confucius (born Kong Qiu, 551–c. 479 BCE), Chinese philosopher of the Spring and Autumn period

=== Kong ===
- Kong Anguo (156–c. 74 BC), Western Han Dynasty Confucian scholar and government official
- Augustine Kong, statistical geneticist
- Kong Bai Ji (1932–2018), Chinese artist
- Kong Changsheng (born 1963), Chinese politician
- Kong Dongmei (born 1972), Chinese entrepreneur
- Kong Fanying (born 1996), Chinese alpine skier
- Kong Fanyu (born 1993), Chinese freestyle skier, Olympic bronze medalist
- Kong Hee-yong (born 1996), South Korean badminton player, Olympic bronze medalist
- Kong Ja-young (born 1985), South Korean judoka
- Kong Jeong-bae (born 1968), South Korean rower
- Kong Ji (481–402 BC), Chinese philosopher and grandson of Confucius
- Kong Lin (actress) (born 1969), Chinese actress, producer, singer
- Kong Linghui (born 1975), Chinese retired table tennis player, Olympic gold medalist
- Kong Lingwei (born 1995), Chinese sprinter
- Kong Lingzhong (born 1953), Chinese politician
- Kong Meiyu (born 1960), Chinese speed skater
- Kong Qingdong (born 1964), Chinese academic, author, social commentator
- Kong Rong (150s–208), Eastern Han Dynasty poet and politician
- Kong Sang-jeong (born 1996), South Korean short track speed skater, Olympic gold medalist
- Kong Shangren (1648–1718), Qing Dynasty dramatist and poet
- Kong Su-chang (born 1961), South Korean film director and screenwriter
- Kong Tai Heong (1875–1951), the first Chinese woman to practice medicine in Hawaii
- Kong Wei (died 895), Tang Dynasty official
- Kong Yaqi (born 2008), Chinese swimmer, Olympic gold medalist
- Kong Yingchao (born 1982), Chinese former biathlete
- Kong Yingda (574–648), Sui and Tang Dynasty philosopher
- Kong Youde (died 1652), Ming Dynasty general
- Kong Young-il (born 1943), South Korean master of taekwondo and one of the twelve original masters of taekwondo of the Korea Taekwondo Association
- Kong Yun-jin (born 1981), South Korean gymnast
- Kong Zhaoshou (1876–1929), Chinese educator

=== Kung ===
- H. H. Kung (1880–1967), Chinese-Taiwanese banker and politician
- H. T. Kung (born 1945), Taiwanese-born American computer scientist
- Kung Te-cheng (1920–2008), Duke Yansheng, Confucian ceremonial official
- Kung Tsui-chang (born 1975), Confucian ceremonial official

=== Gong ===
- Gong Byeong-ho (born 1960), South Korean economist and author
- Gong Byung-min (born 1991), South Korean freestyle wrestler
- Gong Chan-shik (stage name Gongchan, born 1993), South Korean singer and actor, member of boy group B1A4
- Gong Deok-gwi (1911–1997), the second First Lady of South Korea, wife of Yun Po-sun
- Gong Hyo-jin (born 1980), South Korean actress
- Gong Hyo-suk (born 1986), South Korean cyclist
- Gong Hyun-joo (born 1984), South Korean actress
- Gong Hyung-jin (born 1969), South Korean actor
- Gong Jiyeong (born 1963), South Korean novelist
- Gong Min-hyun (born 1990), South Korean footballer
- Gong Min-ji (stage name Minzy, born 1994), South Korean singer and dancer, member of girl group 2NE1
- Gong Oh-kyun (born 1974), South Korean football manager and former player
- Gong Seon-ok (born 1963), South Korean writer
- Gong Sung-jin (born 1953), South Korean politician
- Gong Tae-ha (born 1987), South Korean footballer
- Gong Yoo (born 1979), South Korean actor

=== Khổng ===
- Khổng Thị Hằng (born 1993), Vietnamese footballer
- Khổng Tú Quỳnh (born 1991), Vietnamese singer

=== Hung ===
- Ho-fung Hung (born 1972), American sociologist and political scientist
- Hung Ling-fook (better known as Susan Tse, born 1951), Hong Kong actress
- William Hung (born 1982), Hong Kong-born American motivational speaker and former singer

== See also ==
- Confucius Genealogy Compilation Committee
