= Janggiya =

Manchu clan and family name

Manchu name
- Manchu script: ᠵᠠᠩᡤᡳᠶᠠ

Chinese name
- Chinese: 章佳氏
Transcriptions
Standard Mandarin
- Hanyu Pinyin: zhāng jiā shì

Pronunciation respelling name
- Pronunciation respelling: ZHAH-NG-ghee-yah

Janggiya is a Manchu clan and family name recorded as one of the Eight Great Manchu noble clans in some historical documents. Derived from the place name Janggiya, the clan traces its ancestry to Mudu Bayan, whose descendants settled in various regions and gradually joined to Nurhaci in the founding of Later Jin. Following the fall of the Qing dynasty, members of the clan largely adopted Chinese surnames such as Zhang (张), Yin (尹), Zhang (章), Che (车), Jiang (姜), Ying (英), Ning (宁), and Dun (敦).

== Overview ==
The most prominent lineage descended from Hurhu Cangginai, a grandson of Mudu Bayan. His descendants included the statesman Agui, who served as Grand Secretary of the Wuying Hall (武英殿大學士) and Grand Councillor (軍機大臣) and was granted noble title of Duke First Class (一等公爵) for his military achievements in the Jinchuan campaigns.

Other distinguished descendants of Mudu Bayan who produced notable officials such as Yentai, Grand Secretary of the Dongge Hall and Minister of War, and his son Yengišan, a jinshi graduate who eventually become Grand Secretary of the Wenhua Hall. Several members of the clan also held hereditary titles and distinguished themselves in campaigns against the Ming, the Dzungars, and other enemies of the Qing.

In addition to the descendants of Mudu Bayan, historical records mention other Janggiya lineages, including families settled at Mardun Janggiya, Bardu, Maca, and the Changbai Mountains, many of whose members earned minor hereditary ranks and military honors through service to the Qing dynasty.
