= Bi-State =

Bi-State could refer to any of the following:

== Historic places ==
- Bi (state), A Chinese ancient vassal state

== Transportation ==
- Metro Transit (St. Louis) - an enterprise of the Bi-State Development Agency

== Organisations ==
- Bi-State Development Agency

== Landmarks and buildings ==
- Bi-State Vietnam Gold Star Bridges
- Bi-State Parks Airport

== Sport events ==
- Bi-State League
- Bi-State League (1915)
- Bi-State Conference

== See also ==
- Bi (surname)
