= Yang =

Yang may refer to:

- the bright force in yin and yang, one half of the two symbolic polarities in Chinese philosophy
  - the Sun in this philosophy
- Korean yang, former unit of currency of Korea from 1892 to 1902
- YANG, a data modeling language for the NETCONF network configuration protocol

== Geography ==
- Yang County, in Shaanxi, China
- Yangzhou (ancient China), also known as Yang Prefecture
- Yang (state), ancient Chinese state
- Yang, Iran, a village in Razavi Khorasan Province
- Yang River (disambiguation)

== People ==
- Yang, one of the names for the Karen people in the Thai language
- Yang di-Pertuan Agong, the constitutional monarch of Malaysia
- Yang (surname) (楊), a Chinese surname
- Yang (surname 陽), a Chinese surname
- Yang (surname 羊), a Chinese surname
- Yang (Korean surname)
- Yang Rong (businessman) (仰融, born 1957), Chinese businessman
- Yang Zhu, Chinese philosopher and founder of Yangism.

=== Fictional characters ===
- Cristina Yang, on the TV show Grey's Anatomy
- Yang, from the show Yin Yang Yo!
- Kodokuna Yang, a character in Ninjago
- Yang, Experiment 502 in Lilo & Stitch: The Series
- Yang Fang Leiden, from Final Fantasy IV
- Yang Lee, in the Street Fighter III series of videogames
- Mr. Yang, the Yin Yang serial killer in an episode of Psych
- Yang Wen-li, from Legend of the Galactic Heroes
- Yang Xiao Long, a character from the RWBY animated series

== See also ==
- Yang-style tai chi, a Chinese martial art named after the Yang family
