= Nan (surname) =

Family name

Nan (南), Nangong (南宮), Nanguo (南郭) is a Chinese surname.

== Nan 南 ==
- Henan (河南) Based Nan (南) family Founded with Patronymic Nan (南)
- during the Xia dynasty, Si (姒) family get surname (南)
- during the Zhou dynasty, Ji (姬) family get surname (南)
- two-syllable surname Nangong (南宮), Nanguo (南郭) reduce surname to Nan (南)
- during the Han dynasty, other Nan (南) family founded in Zhejiang
- There is a large population of Nan families in Guayaquil, Ecuador. This Nan family migrated from China to Ecuador in the early 1940s.

== Nangong 南宮 ==
Nangong (南宮) is a two-syllable family name from the city name "Nangong" (南宮), later reduce a surname to Nan (南).

== Nanguo 南郭 ==
- Nanguo (南郭) is a two-syllable family name from old city name "Nanguo" (南郭), later reduce a surname to Nan (南). during the Zhou dynasty, Guo Shu (虢叔) lived in Nanguo (南郭).
- Nanguo River (南果河) is a right-hand tributary of Mekong river in Menghai County, Yunnan, China

== Nan 難 / 难 ==
- Nan (難) is another family name based in Henan but originate from Xianbei surname "Tunan" (吐難) during the Northern dynasties. Now this surname is rare in Henan, and some descendants are now living in Korea.

== Notable people ==
- Nan Geng (南庚), King of the Shang dynasty of ancient China
- Nan Huai-Chin (南怀瑾; 1918–2012), Chinese Buddhist monk, religious scholar, writer
- Nan Ping (南萍; 1918–1989), Chinese politician
- Nan Rendong (南仁东; 1945–2017), Chinese astronomer
- Nan Song (南松; born 1997), Chinese footballer
- Nan Yunqi (南云齐, born 1993), Chinese footballer
