= Eight surnames of Zhurong =

Chinese list of surnames

The eight surnames of Zhurong (Chinese: 祝融八姓) are eight Chinese surnames derived from the descendants of the ancient Chinese legendary figure Zhurong. The Eight surnames that came after the Zhurong tribe, according to the Guoyu, a historical Chinese text, are Ji, Dong, Peng, Tu, Wei, Cao, Zhen, and Mi. These eight surnames were said to have originated from the descendants of the Zhurong tribe.

According to the Guoyu, the Ji surname was associated with the Kunwu and Su tribes, which were located in present-day Yuncheng in Shanxi province and Wen County in Henan province, respectively. The Dong surname was associated with the Zongyi and Hualong tribes, which were located in present-day Dingtao County in Shandong province and in present-day Henan province. The Peng surname was associated with the Pengzu and Shiwei tribes, which were located in present-day Tongshan County in Jiangsu province and Puyang County in Hebei province, respectively. The Tu surname was associated with the Zhuren tribe, which was located in present-day Wen County in Henan province.

The Wei surname was associated with the Wu and Kuai tribes, which were located in present-day Yan County in Henan province and present-day Mi County in Henan province, respectively. The Cao surname was associated with the Zou and Lu tribes, the location of which is not specified. The Zhen surname was associated with the Biyang tribe, which was located in present-day Yicheng County in Shandong province. The Mi surname was associated with the Mi tribe, the location of which is not specified.

== List ==
1. Cao
2. Peng
3. Balu (禿姓)
4. Si
5. Yun
6. Zhen (斟)
7. Ji
8. Mi

== Origins ==
It is written in the Guoyu that there were eight surnames after Zhu Rong: Cao, Peng, Balu, Si, Yun, Zhen, Ji, and Mi. The historian of Dongwu Wei Zhao, who interpreted the Guoyu, wrote that the eight surnames were the descendants of Zhurong. The eight surnames are: Cao, Peng, Balu (禿姓), Si, Yun, Zhen (斟), Ji, and Mi. Hou Bo, the uncle of the vassals.

== The six surnames of Zhurong and the eight surnames of Zhurong ==
According to the Records of the Grand Historian, the ancestors of Chu came from the emperor Zhuanxu, who was the son of Chang Yi and the grandson of Huang Di. He is the son of Changyi, and the son of Zhurong. He served as a fire officer for the emperor and was named "Zhurong" by imperial decree. Later, when Chongli was executed for his crimes, his brother Wu Hui became his successor as fire officer and was still called Zhurong. Wu Hui gave birth to Lu Jian. He had six sons, Kunwu, Senhu, Peng Zu, Huiren, Cao, and Jilian, and mentions Jilian as the ancestor of the surname Chu, which descended from Chu.

The Shiben. The Shiben of the Emperors. The six sons of Lu Jian are also recorded in the Six Sons of Lu Jian as Kunwu, Senhu, Pengzu, Huiren, Cao, and Jilian. In the late Han Dynasty, the scholar Song Zhi made a note stating that Kunwu was born from the surname of Ji, Senhu was born from the surname of S, and Hu was born from the surname of Food (a surname of Ji). Therefore, Lu, the son of Zhu Rong (Wu Hui), finally had six sons, who were born from the surnames of Hsi, S, Peng, Food, Cao, and Mi, which are the "six surnames of Zhu Rong".

Later on, the Peng surname was divided into the surname of Vu, and the Cao surname was divided into the surname of Zhu and the surname of Pu. Therefore, the eight surnames of Zhurong were formed: 己, 斯, 彭, 秃, 먹용, 曹, 斟, 芈. There is also a theory that the surname of Ji was divided into the surname of Dong.

== See also ==
- Eight Great Surnames of Chinese Antiquity

== Extended Reading ==
- 李学勤. 谈祝融八姓. 江汉论坛. 1980年02期 - 中國知網 （页面存档备份，存于）
- 何幼琦. 论祝融及其后“八姓. 江汉论坛. 1994年04期 - 中國知網 （页面存档备份，存于）
- 祝融八姓 - 中國學問 （页面存档备份，存于）
