= Jiāng (surname 姜) =

Chinese family name

Jiang (Chinese: 姜, also romanized Gang, Geung, Gung, Chiang, Kang, Keung, Keong, Kiang) is one of the oldest Chinese surnames, being one of the original xing (姓) surnames. It was one of the "Eight Great Xings of High Antiquity" (上古八大姓), along with Jī (姬), Yáo (姚), Yíng (嬴), Sì (姒), Yún (妘), Guī (媯) and Rèn (妊), though some sources quote Jí (姞) as the last one instead of Rèn. Of these xing, only Jiang and Yao have survived in their original form to modern days as frequently occurring surnames. It is the 32nd surname listed in the Song dynasty-era Hundred Family Surnames poem. It is the 60th most common surname in China (2007), roughly 0.34% of the Han Chinese population. The Lu clan of Fanyang stem from this surname before taking on the Lu (盧) surname. Derivative surnames of Jiang include Zhang, Lü, Qiu, and Shen.

The surname's use has various origins:

- In the Qi (state), Jiang Ziya's descendants had the surname Jiang (姜).
- In the Qi (state), those with the surname Huan (桓) changed it to Jiang (姜).
- Chinese minority members of the population such as the Dong people, Tujia people, Yao people took the surname Jiang (姜).
- During the Yuan dynasty, Mongols were given the surname Jiang (姜).
- During the Qing dynasty, Russians, or the Eluosizu people, were given the surname Jiang (姜).

Additionally, it is the most common Hanja that represents the Korean surname Kang.

== Notable people named 姜 ==
- Yan Emperor (炎帝), legendary ancient Chinese ruler in pre-dynastic era; also known as Shennong; the origin of surname Jiang; ancestral to Chinese culture and people; see Descendants of Yan and Huang (炎黄子孙); Shennong § Shennong in literature
- Jiang Ziya (姜子牙), strategist and noble of Zhou dynasty; descendant of Yan Emperor (11th century BC)
- Jiang Xiaobai (姜小白), Duke Huan of Qi (齐桓公); the head of state of the most prominent Hegemon Zhou dynasty in the Five Hegemons era (770–476 BC)
- Jiang Wei (姜维), general of the state of Shu during the Three Kingdoms period of China (220–280 AD)
- Jiang Gongfu (姜公辅), chancellor of the Tang dynasty (618–907 AD)
- Jiang Kui (姜夔), poet, composer, poetry theorist and calligrapher of the Song dynasty (960–1279 AD)
- Jiang Lifu (姜立夫), Chinese mathematician and educator widely regarded as the Father of modern Chinese mathematics
- Jiang Boju (姜伯驹), Chinese mathematician specializes in topology; expanded Nielsen theory; professor and the first president of School of Mathematical Sciences at Peking University
- Jiang Chunyun (姜春云), former Vice Premier of the People's Republic of China
- Jiang Yu (姜瑜), diplomat of the People's Republic of China
- Jiang Wen (姜文), actor and director (brother of Jiang Wu)
- Jiang Wu (姜武), actor (brother of Jiang Wen)
- Ted Chiang (姜峯楠), American science-fiction author
- David Chiang (姜大衛), Hong Kong actor and martial artist
- Chiang Chang-nien (姜昌年), a Hong Kong actor known by the stage name Paul Chun (秦沛) who is an older brother of another Hong Kong actor David Chiang
- Keung To (姜濤), a Hong Kong singer from boy group Mirror
- Weijia Jiang (姜伟嘉), Chinese-born American journalist for CBS News, president of White House Correspondents' Association

== Derivative surnames ==
- Zha (surname) (查)
