= Eight Great Surnames of Chinese Antiquity =

Eight Han surnames in Chinese antiquity

- Chinese: 上古八大姓
Transcriptions
Standard Mandarin
- Hanyu Pinyin: Shànggǔ Bā Dàxìng

The eight great surnames of Chinese antiquity were among the most important Chinese surnames in Chinese antiquity. They are all Chinese ancestral surnames, and as such, have Chinese clan surnames branching off from them. During the earliest Chinese antiquity, Chinese society focused on women. Family names often passed from women to their children. Because of this phenomenon, these eight surnames have a component of their hanzi representing the character woman (女).

As of 2019, very few people had one of these surnames as a family name. An exception is the surnames Yao and Jiang. Of these, there are some well-known Chinese of modern times with these names today. One example is Yao Ming (姚明).

== The eight surnames ==
姞 is also sometimes considered one of the eight great surnames of Chinese antiquity. 姞 then replaces the surname 妊.

Traditional Chinese	Pinyin	Jyutping
姜 Jiang	jiāng	goeng1
姬 Ji	jī	gei1
姚 Yao	yáo	jiu4
嬴 Ying	yíng	jing4
姒 Si	sì	ci5
妘 Yun	yún	wan4
妊 Ren (replaced with 姞 Ji in some sources)	rèn	jam4
媯 Gui	guī	gwai1
姞 Ji (in some sources, replaces 妊 Ren)	jí	gat1

== See also ==
- Eight surnames of Zhurong
