= Bi (surname) =

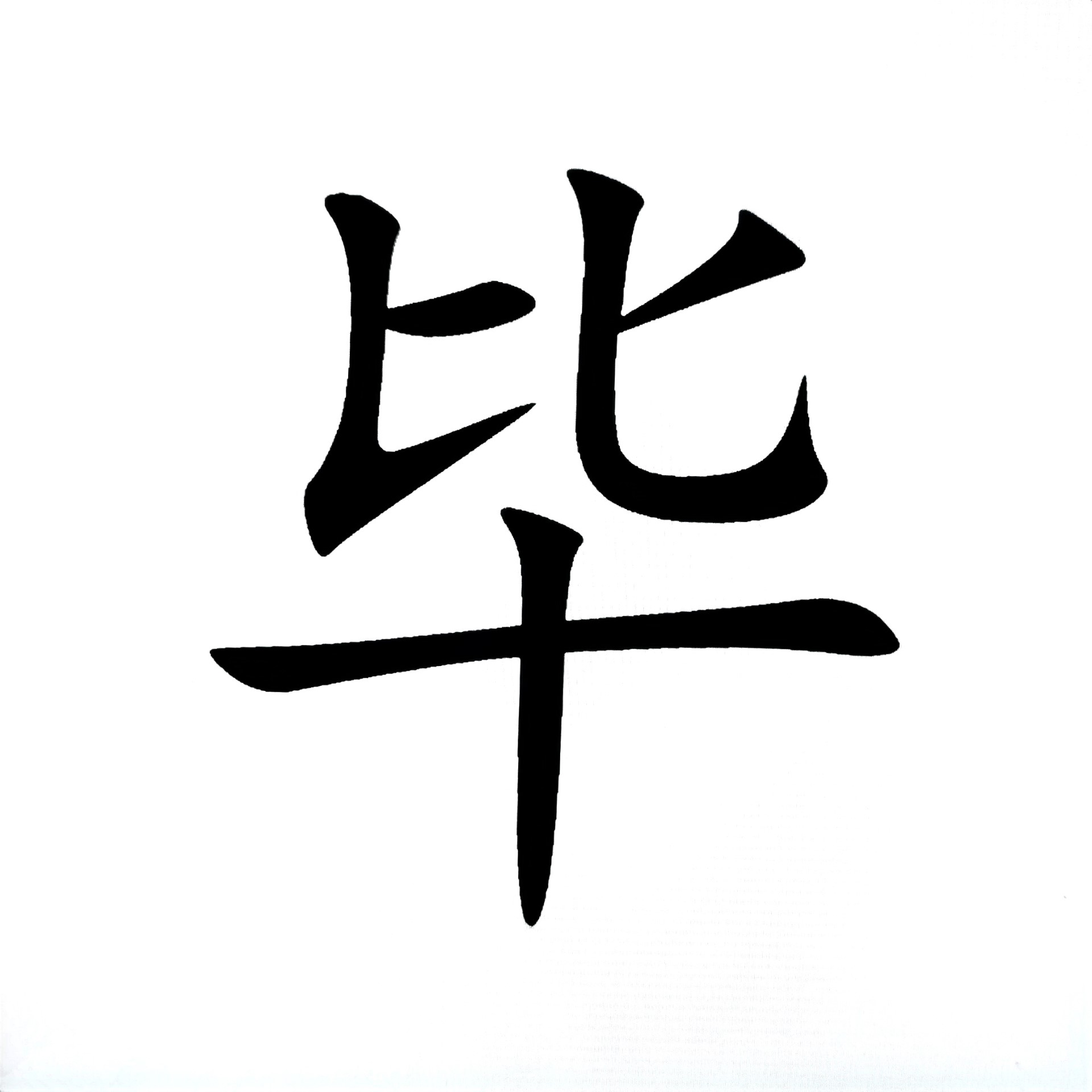
- The simplified Character for Bi
- Traditional Chinese: 畢
- Simplified Chinese: 毕
Transcriptions
Standard Mandarin
- Hanyu Pinyin: Bì
- Wade–Giles: Pi

Bi (traditional Chinese: 畢; simplified Chinese: 毕; pinyin: Bì; Wade–Giles: Pi) is a Chinese surname. It is listed 76th in the Song dynasty classic text, the Hundred Family Surnames.

== Origin ==
1. Deriving from the surname Ji, King Wen of Zhou's fifteenth son Bi Gonggao was given the title of Bi, his descendants then used the surname Bi.
2. Originating from Ethnic minorities.

== Notable people ==
- Bi Chunfang (1927–2016), Yue opera singer
- Bi Feiyu (born 1964), fiction writer
- Bi Fujian (born 1959), professor and television presenter
- Bi Gui (died 249), official during the Three Kingdoms period
- Bi Hongyong (born 1974), high jumper
- Bi Jingquan (born 1955), economist and trade official
- Bi Jinhao (born 1991), football player
- Bi Sheng (990–1051), inventor of printing technology
- Bi Shiduo (died 888), Tang dynasty army officer
- Bi Wenjing (born 1981), gymnast
- Bi Wenjun (born 1997), singer and actor, member of NEXT
- Bi Xian (802–864), Tang dynasty official
- Bi Xiaoliang (born 1992), high jumper
- Bi Yan (born 1984), women's soccer player
- Bi Hansheng, Chinese name adopted by Irish comedian Des Bishop (born 1975)
- Kenneth Bi, Hong Kong-Canadian actor
- Bii (singer) (born 1989), also called Bi Shu-jin, South Korean-born Taiwanese singer
- Tianshu Bi (Chinese: 毕天姝, born 1973), Chinese electrical engineer
