= Gong (surname) =

Gong is the pinyin romanization of several distinct Chinese surnames, including 宫, 龔, 共, 公, 鞏, 功, 貢, and 弓. It may also be an alternative transcription of the surname Kong (Chinese: 孔, Korean: 공), or the Jyutping romanization of the Chinese surname Jiang.

== List of surnames romanized Gong ==
- Gōng (龔; 龚) is the 192nd most common surname in China.
- Gōng (公) ranks 408 in China.
- Gǒng (鞏; 巩; gong3) ranks 370 in China. Origins from Zhou dynasty clan, from Qiang people alike Tibet people, or from Jin (state) clan.
- Gōng (功) from Jiang (姜) clan, from noble of Song (state), or from Mongol people.
- Gòng (貢; 贡) from add-name Ji Gong (子貢) of Duanmu Ci (端木賜 / Dyun Muk; clan from Shaohao).
- Gōng (宫; 宮) ranks 240th in Hundred Family Surnames and is mainly derived from Ji (surname 冀).

== 龔, 龚 ==
Gong

Chinese name
- Traditional Chinese: 龔
- Simplified Chinese: 龚
Transcriptions
Standard Mandarin
- Hanyu Pinyin: Gōng
- Wade–Giles: Kung1
Wu
- Romanization: jiong
Yue: Cantonese
- Jyutping: gung1

Vietnamese name
- Vietnamese: Cung
- Chữ Hán: 龔

Gōng (traditional Chinese: 龔; simplified Chinese: 龚) is the 192nd most common surname in China. It is the 99th surname listed in the Hundred Family Surnames. As of 2002, there are around 1.5 million people with this surname in China, representing 0.2% of its population. They are most commonly found along the Yangtze River basin, especially in Anhui.

=== Origin ===
One legend claims that the surname Gōng was derived from another similar-sounding surname, Gòng (共). A member of the Gòng clan, fleeing his troubles, supposedly changed his surname to Gōng by adding the character for dragon (龍) above his original surname (共).

Other stories claim that the Gōng clan are descended from a minister of the Yellow Emperor named Gong Gu (共鼓), or a minister of Emperor Yao named Gong Gong (共工).

A number of Zhou dynasty royal clans, from the states of Zheng, Wei, Jin, or Chu, had the surname Gong, from which the modern name may be derived. It may also come from the Gong tribe of the ancient state of Ba in Sichuan. A number of prominent people named Gong lived near the lower reaches of the Jialing River during the Han dynasty.

=== Notable people ===
- Gong Xian, Ming and Qing dynasty painter
- Gong Ao, ruler of the Kingdom of Linjiang during the Chu-Han Contention
- Gong Wei, ruler of the Kingdom of Linjiang, succeeding Gong Ao
- Kiong Kong Tuan, 19th century Chinese merchant
- Gong Ruina, Chinese badminton player
- Gong Zhichao, former Chinese badminton player
- Kung Ming-hsin, Taiwanese politician
- Serene Koong (born 1988), Singaporean singer-songwriter
- Gong Linna (born 1975), Chinese singer-songwriter
- Kaira Gong (born 1981), Singaporean singer
- Daniel Hanwen Gong (born 2003), New Zealand chess player

== 公 ==
Gong (Chinese: 公, rank 408 in China), is a Chinese and Korean surname which comes from Lu (state) clan of Zhou dynasty. The other Gong surnames have disappeared from Korea

Gong may be derived from Chinese two-syllable surnames:

* 公为
- 公华
- 公慎
- 公孟
- 公之
- 公父
- 公冉
- 公甲
- 公古
- 公文
- 公德
- 公玉
- 公丘
- 公冶
- 公析
- 公良
- 公孙 (Note: clan from royal Zichan of Zheng (state))
- 公车
- 公金
- 公石 (Note: clan from ruler Ziban son of Lu (state))
* 公都
- 公建
- 公山
- 公祖
- 公宾
- 公仪
- 公输
- 公牵
- 公羊 (Note: clan from ruler Ziye (monarch) son of Lu (state))
- 公巫
- 公敛
- 公思
- 公若
- 公林
- 公坚
- 公施
- 公荆
- 公仲
- 公朱
* 公上
- 公叔
- 公干
- 公西
- 公宣
- 公仇
- 公行
- 公成
- 公师
- 公族
- 公正
- 公明
- 公子
- 公土
- 公襄
- 公牛
- 公旗
- 公何
- 公夏
