= Yīn (surname) =

Yin
- Yin surname in regular script
- Pronunciation: Yīn (Pinyin); In (Pe̍h-ōe-jī); Yan and Wan (Jyutping)
- Language: Chinese, Korean

Origin
- Language: Chinese
- Origin: Name of the Yin dynasty
- Derivation: Zi (子)
- Meaning: "Flourishing"

Other names
- Variant forms: Heung (Teochew); In (Wu Chinese, Hokkien, Sino-Japanese); Eun (Yoon) (殷, 은) (Sino-Korean)

Yīn (Chinese: 殷; pinyin: Yīn) is a Chinese surname. It is derived from the name of the capital of the Shang dynasty. A 2013 study found that it was the 126th most common surname, being shared by 1,470,000 people or 0.110% of the population, with Jiangsu being the province with the most. It is the 74th name on the Hundred Family Surnames poem.

== History ==
The surname Yīn can date to the fall of the Shang (Yin) dynasty in 1046 BCE. After the dynasty's collapse, surviving ruling family members collectively changed their surname from 子 (pinyin: zǐ; Wade-Giles: tzu; the royal surname) to the name of their fallen capital and country, Yin (殷). The family remained members of the aristocratic class. They often provided administrative services to the Zhou dynasty who succeeded them.

Following the fall of the Shang dynasty, Viscount of Wei (Wei Zi 微子), older brother of Di Xin, the last king of the Shang dynasty, was given the territory around the old Shang capital, and established the State of Song (宋國). Rites for the Shang (Yin) kings continued to 286 BCE.

The surname is still found in northern and northeastern China. There is a diaspora in the area south of the Yangtze River near the Wu region of China, and after the time of the Qing dynasty, immigration to Taiwan and Southeast Asia. Yin settlements are found south-west of Tonghui in Gansu Province, in Shandong Province and in the Pearl River Delta area. A 2013 study found that it was the 126th most common surname, being shared by 1,470,000 people or 0.110% of the population, with Jiangsu being the province with the most.

== Notable people ==
- Yin Hao (殷浩), general of the Jin dynasty.
- Yin Xian (殷羡), general of the Jin dynasty.
- Monica Yin (殷琦; born 1977), Taiwanese actress.
- Yin Yong (殷勇; born 1969), Chinese banker and politician.
- Yin Yin (殷茵; born 1974), former Chinese professional volleyball player.
- Yin Hao (殷昊; born 1979), Chinese International Master former chess player.
- Yin Zhongkan (殷仲堪), intellectual of the Northern and Southern dynasties era.
- Yin Tong (殷同; born 1889), politician and military personnel in the Republic of China.
- Yin Haiguang (殷海光; born 1919), Chinese author, educator and philosopher from Taiwan.
- Yin Hengmin (殷恆民; born 1957), politician and diplomat of the People's Republic of China.
- Lady Yin (殷氏), character featured within the famed classic Chinese novel Fengshen Yanyi.
- Yin Chengzong (殷承宗; born 1941), pianist and composer of the Yellow River Piano Concerto.
- Johnny Yin (殷正洋; born 1961), Taiwanese singer, three-time winner of the Golden Melody Awards.
- Yin Tao (殷桃; born 1979), Chinese actress, winner of the three biggest industry awards including the Feitian Awards, Golden Eagle Awards and the Magnolia Awards.
