= Jianping Yao =

Canadian engineer and professor

Jianping Yao is currently a Distinguished University Professor and University Research Chair, and previously Director of the Ottawa-Carleton Institute for Electrical and Computer Engineering, at the University of Ottawa, and also an author of over 700 scientific papers. He was Editor-in-Chief of IEEE Photonics Technology Letters from 2017 to 2021. Dr. Yao is known for his original contributions to microwave photonics. He is a Fellow of the Institute of Electrical and Electronics Engineers, the Optical Society, the Canadian Academy of Engineering, and the Royal Society of Canada.
