= Tianshu Bi =

Chinese electrical engineer

Tianshu Bi (Chinese: 毕天姝, born 1973) is a Chinese electrical engineer whose research interests include power system protection and phasor measurement. She is the president of the North China Electric Power University and executive deputy director of the State Key Laboratory of Alternative Electrical Power System with Renewable Energy Sources.

== Education and career ==
Bi is originally from Jiyuan. She was a student at North China Electric Power University, where she earned a bachelor's degree in 1994 and a master's degree in 1997. She has a 2002 PhD from the University of Hong Kong.

After joining the Program for New Century Excellent Talents in University of the Chinese Ministry of Education in 2005, she became a professor at the North China Electric Power University in 2006. She became executive deputy director of the State Key Laboratory of Alternative Electrical Power System with Renewable Energy Sources in 2011, and vice president of the North China Electric Power University in 2019.

== Recognition ==
Bi was elected as an IEEE Fellow in 2022, "for contributions to synchrophasor technology and protective relay applications".
