= Qi (surname) =

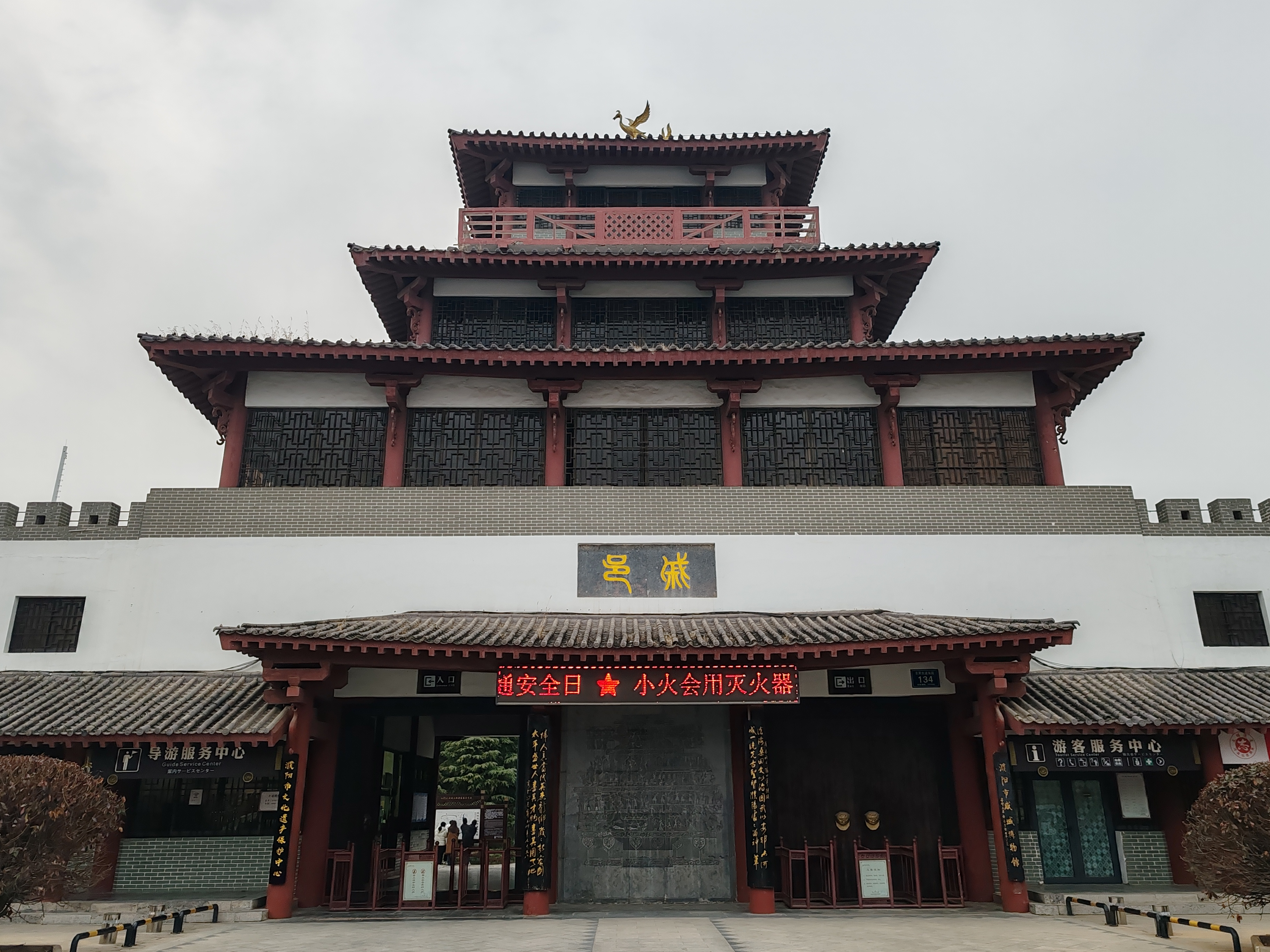
Qi City (戚城) in Puyang, Henan is where Qi (戚) family originated

Qi is the romanization of several Chinese family names, including 祁 (Qí), 齊/齐 (Qí), 戚 (Qī), 乞 (Qǐ), 奇 (Qí), 亓 (Qí) and 綦 (Qí).

== Qí (祁) surname ==
Qi (祁, also commonly written as Chi, and Kei in Cantonese) is a Chinese surname. It originated from the descendants of Shaohao, descendant of Yao (ruler), Ji (姬) family of Jin (Chinese state), Khitan people of Liao dynasty, Hui people of during the Han dynasty, Dongxiang people.

176th most common name, shared by 800,000 people or 0.061% of the population, with Jiangsu being the province with the most.

=== Notable people ===
- Qi Jingyi (祁靜一), Chinese Muslim Qadiriyyah Sufi master
- Qi Hong (祁宏), Chinese footballer
- Qi Jianxin (祁建新), mathematics educator
- Qi Qi (祁琦), gymnast
- Chi Chia-wei (祁家威) LGBTQIA+ rights activist

== Qī (戚) surname ==
Qi (戚, also written as Chik in Cantonese) is a Chinese surname of Wei (state) (魏). 204th most common, shared by 530,000 people or 0.040% of the population, with the province with the most being Jiangsu. It is the 33rd name on the Hundred Family Surnames poem.

=== Notable people ===
- Qi Benyu (戚本禹), Mao-era political figure
- Qi Jiguang (戚繼光), military general during the Ming dynasty
- Qi Jingxuan (戚惊萱), Chinese International Master chess player
- Qi Yuwu (戚玉武), Chinese actor
- Stephy Qi (戚薇), Chinese actress

== Qǐ (乞) surname ==
Qi (乞, also commonly written as Chi, or Hat or Gat in Cantonese) is a Chinese surname, originated from Jiang (surname) (姜) of Qi (state) (齐), and Xianbei of Northern Wei, Mongolian of Yuan dynasty, Jurchens people of Qing dynasty. It is not within the top 400 most common names in 2013.

== Qí (奇) surname ==
Qi (奇, also commonly written as Ji or Ci in mandarin, Kei in Cantonese) is a Chinese surname. during the Qing dynasty, Khitan people Cideri (奇德哩), Cidumu (奇杜穆), Cileng (奇楞), Cimosi (奇墨斯), Citela (奇塔喇), Cilei (奇壘) reduce surname Qi (奇). during the Qing dynasty, Jurchen the Du (surname) (杜) family Chenge surname to Qi (奇).

During the Northern Wei, Qijin (奇斤) family reduce their surname to Qi (奇). During the Yuan dynasty, Mongolian Cirgote (奇尔果特) was reduced to Qi (奇). During the middle Zhou dynasty, Lu (state)'s Ji (姬) family took the surname Qi (奇).

In Korea, it is romanized as Ki or Gi.

It was not within the 400 most common names in 2013.

== Qí (亓) surname ==
Qi (亓 also written as Kei in Cantonese) is a Chinese surname from Qiquan (亓官) the name of Public Office during the Xia dynasty. In 2013 it was the 346th most common surnames, shared by 134,000 people or 0.010% of the population, with the province with the most being Shandong.
