= Qi Jianxin =

Chinese politician

- 齐建新

Governor of Diqing Tibetan Autonomous Prefecture
- In office September 2015 – February 2022
- Deputy: Jiang Chu (executive vice governor); Yang Zhengyi (vice governor)
- Party Secretary: Yin Bai; Gu Kun; Wang Yizhi
- Preceded by: Huang Zhenghong
- Succeeded by: Zhang Weidong

Personal details
- Born: January 1965 (age 61) Shangri-La City, Yunnan, China
- Party: Chinese Communist Party
- Education: Central Party School of the Chinese Communist Party

Chinese name
- Simplified Chinese: 齐建新
- Traditional Chinese: 齊建新
Transcriptions
Standard Mandarin
- Hanyu Pinyin: Qí Jiànxīn

Qi Jianxin (Chinese: 齐建新; born January 1965) is a former Chinese politician of Tibetan ethnicity who spent his entire career in his home province Yunnan. As of April 2024, he was under investigation by China's top anti-graft watchdog. Previously he served as governor of Diqing Tibetan Autonomous Prefecture.

== Career ==
Qi was born in Shangri-La City, Yunnan, in January 1965. He entered politics in December 1985. He successively served as deputy director of the Personnel and Labor Bureau of Diqing Tibetan Autonomous Prefecture, director of the Labor and Social Security Bureau, executive deputy head of the Organization Department of the CCP Diqing Prefecture Committee, secretary of the CCP Deqin County Committee, a member of the Standing Committee of the CCP Baoshan Municipal Committee and secretary of the Baoshan Municipal Commission for Discipline Inspection, and a member of the Standing Committee of the CCP Diqing Tibetan Autonomous Prefectural Committee and secretary of the Diqing Tibetan Autonomous Prefectural Commission for Discipline Inspection. Qi was elevated to deputy party secretary of Diqing Tibetan Autonomous Prefecture in March 2015. In September of that same year, he was named acting governor, confirmed in February 2016. He retired in February 2022 and was recruited as a counselor of the Yunnan Provincial People's Government.

== Downfall ==
On 9 April 2024, he surrendered himself to the Central Commission for Discipline Inspection (CCDI), the party's internal disciplinary body, and the National Supervisory Commission, the highest anti-corruption agency of China.

His deputies, vice governor Yang Zhengyi (杨正义) handed himself into the anti-corruption agency on 17 July 2023; executive vice governor Jiang Chu (江楚) turned himself into the anti-corruption agency on 29 February 2024.

Government offices
| Preceded by Huang Zhenghong | Governor of Diqing Tibetan Autonomous Prefecture; 2015–2022 | Succeeded by Zhang Weidong |
