= Wuyang County =

Wuyang County 舞阳县
- County
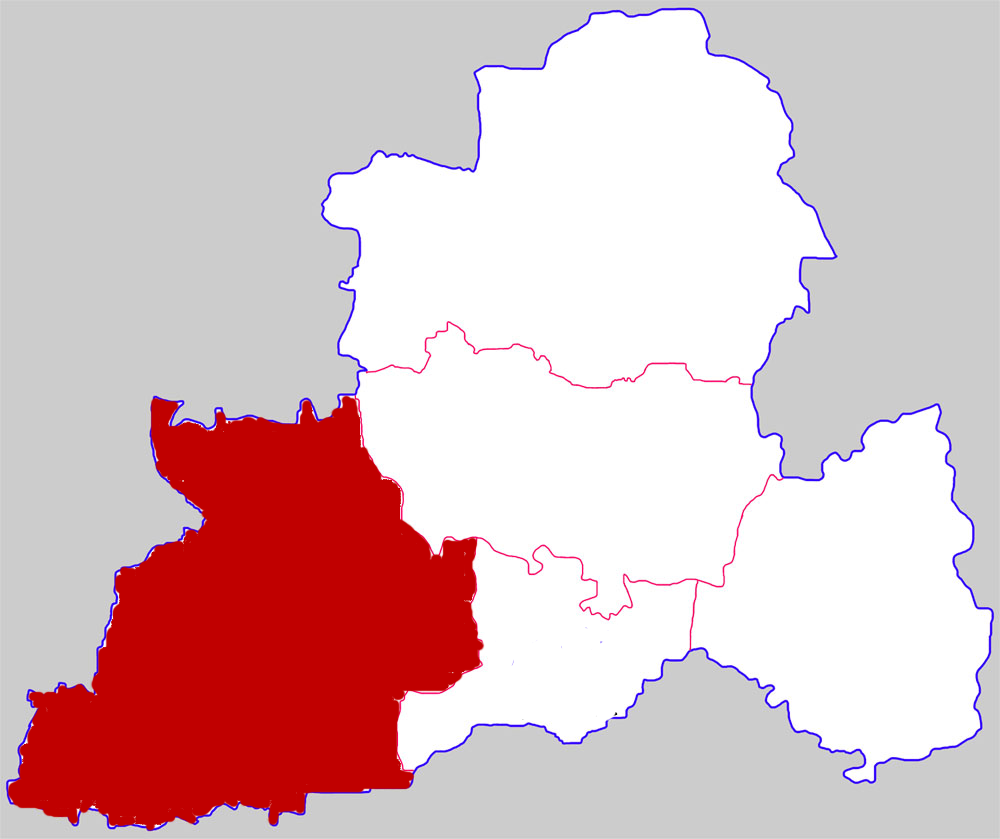
- Wuyang in Luohe

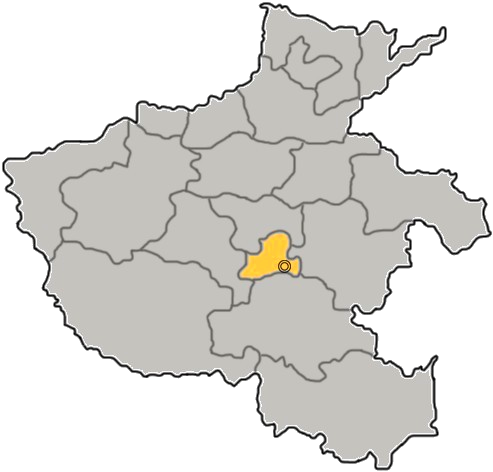
- Luohe in Henan
- Coordinates: 33°26′17″N 113°36′32″E
- Country: People's Republic of China
- Province: Henan
- Prefecture-level city: Luohe

Area
  - Total: 776 km^{2} (300 sq mi)

Population (2019)
  - Total: 563,800
  - Density: 727/km^{2} (1,880/sq mi)
- Time zone: UTC+8 (China Standard)
- Postal code: 462400

Wuyang County (simplified Chinese: 舞阳县; traditional Chinese: 舞陽縣; pinyin: Wǔyáng Xiàn) is a county in the central part of Henan province, China. It is both the westernmost and southernmost county-level division of the prefecture-level city of Luohe.

== Administrative divisions ==
As of 2012, this county is divided to 7 towns and 7 townships.

Towns

- Beiwudu (北舞渡镇)
- Lianhua (莲花镇)
- Mengzhai (孟寨镇)
- Taiwei (太尉镇)
- Wucheng (吴城镇)
- Wuquan (舞泉镇)
- Xin'an (辛安镇)

Townships

- Baohe Township (保和乡)
- Houji Township (侯集乡)
- Jiangdian Township (姜店乡)
- Jiujie Township (九街乡)
- Macun Township (马村乡)
- Wenfeng Township (文峰乡)
- Zhanghua Township (章化乡)

== Climate ==
Climate data for Wuyang, elevation 91 m (299 ft), (1991–2020 normals, extremes 1981–present)
Month	Jan	Feb	Mar	Apr	May	Jun	Jul	Aug	Sep	Oct	Nov	Dec	Year
Record high °C (°F)	19.3 (66.7)	23.6 (74.5)	34.4 (93.9)	34.0 (93.2)	39.4 (102.9)	40.0 (104.0)	41.1 (106.0)	39.1 (102.4)	40.0 (104.0)	35.0 (95.0)	27.6 (81.7)	21.0 (69.8)	41.1 (106.0)
Mean daily maximum °C (°F)	6.3 (43.3)	10.0 (50.0)	15.3 (59.5)	21.8 (71.2)	27.4 (81.3)	31.9 (89.4)	32.1 (89.8)	30.5 (86.9)	27.1 (80.8)	22.1 (71.8)	14.8 (58.6)	8.5 (47.3)	20.7 (69.2)
Daily mean °C (°F)	0.9 (33.6)	4.0 (39.2)	9.2 (48.6)	15.4 (59.7)	21.0 (69.8)	25.9 (78.6)	27.2 (81.0)	25.7 (78.3)	21.3 (70.3)	16.0 (60.8)	9.0 (48.2)	2.9 (37.2)	14.9 (58.8)
Mean daily minimum °C (°F)	−3.4 (25.9)	−0.7 (30.7)	3.9 (39.0)	9.4 (48.9)	14.9 (58.8)	20.3 (68.5)	23.2 (73.8)	22.0 (71.6)	16.9 (62.4)	11.1 (52.0)	4.2 (39.6)	−1.4 (29.5)	10.0 (50.1)
Record low °C (°F)	−14.4 (6.1)	−16.0 (3.2)	−9.1 (15.6)	−1.8 (28.8)	3.5 (38.3)	11.3 (52.3)	16.9 (62.4)	12.2 (54.0)	7.9 (46.2)	−0.5 (31.1)	−9.0 (15.8)	−11.8 (10.8)	−16.0 (3.2)
Average precipitation mm (inches)	17.5 (0.69)	18.9 (0.74)	37.9 (1.49)	47.5 (1.87)	77.7 (3.06)	110.4 (4.35)	214.5 (8.44)	151.8 (5.98)	86.7 (3.41)	50.9 (2.00)	38.8 (1.53)	16.1 (0.63)	868.7 (34.19)
Average precipitation days (≥ 0.1 mm)	5.0	5.1	6.6	7.0	8.2	8.3	11.7	11.3	9.3	7.1	6.1	4.6	90.3
Average snowy days	4.3	3.0	1.4	0	0	0	0	0	0	0	1.0	2.7	12.4
Average relative humidity (%)	69	69	70	72	70	68	82	86	80	73	73	70	74
Mean monthly sunshine hours	129.3	133.7	170.1	195.2	207.0	194.1	188.4	173.4	152.3	150.4	141.4	136.9	1,972.2
Percentage possible sunshine	41	43	46	50	48	45	43	42	42	43	46	45	45
Source: China Meteorological Administration
