= Zhou dynasty nobility =

Aristocratic system in ancient China

The nobility of the Zhou dynasty refers to the power dynamics of the aristocracy in Zhou dynasty China. The nobility interacted with the royal apparatus of state across multiple dimensions of relationship, and in ways that changed over time. This has been subject to considerable misunderstanding, compounded in translation by an enduring false equivalence between titles of Zhou nobles and those of European feudal peers as well as inattention to context in certain use cases. Chinese bronze inscriptions and other excavated texts have helped clarify the historical situation.

== Western Zhou ==
The Zhou dynasty grew out of a predynastic polity with its own existing power structure, primarily organized as a set of culturally affiliated kinship groups. The defining characteristics of a noble were their ancestral temple surname (姓; xìng), their lineage line within that ancestral surname, and seniority within that lineage line.

Shortly after the Zhou conquest of Shang (1046 or 1045 BCE), the immediate goal of the nascent dynasty was to consolidate its power over its newly expanded geographical range, especially in light of the Rebellion of the Three Guards following the death of the conquering King Wu of Zhou. To this end, royal relatives were granted lands outside the old Zhou homeland, and given relatively sovereign authority over those spaces.

The Zhou government thus had multiple dimensions of relationship with different sorts of powerful men. The lineage elders of the old homelands were related to the royal house mostly through the pre-existing kinship structure, and not all were politically subservient. The regional lords were established to provide a screen to the royal lands and exert control over culturally distinct polities and were mostly defined by that responsibility, but this was also embedded in the kinship groups. Some few high government ministers had special, non-hereditary titles of nobility. Lastly, there were the leaders of polities outside the Zhou cultural sphere. This complicated set of dynamics gave rise to the following set of terms.

=== Gong ===
Gong (公; gōng) was a term of highest respect, and can be rendered in English as Lord to a high level of accuracy. The original meaning seems to have been "senior lineage male", cognate with wēng (翁; 'respected elder').

The leaders of existing Zhou cultural polities within the same ancestral temple surname as the royal house (Jī; 姬), such as Guo (虢), were rarely called Gong, in which case, it also carried the meaning patriarch. The rulers of Song, descended from the royal house of Shang, also bore this title.

The three highest government ministers in the early Zhou were the Grand Tutor (太傅; tàifù), the Grand Protector (太保; tàibǎo), and the Grand Preceptor (太師; tàishī). These men were called Gong, although their descendants did not inherit this title. The system of three was not always in effect throughout the dynasty, but there was often one or more ministers set above the rest of the government, always called Gong regardless of specific title.

In their own ancestral temple, any ancestor of suitable distance and regardless of noble title in life could be referred to as Gong. This practice increased over time, with lineages "upgrading" their ancestors without discernible pattern.

Within their own polity, any living ruler could be addressed as, or referred to as, Gong, which carries the English connotation of e.g. your Grace or his Excellency.

=== Hou ===
Hou (侯; hóu) were the regional lords, rulers of the border states, appointed from a pool of close relatives by the early Zhou court to project force and secure the dynasty. Modern English scholarship also renders this term as lord or as regional lord. They form a geographically bounded set, outside the predynastic Zhou homeland. A 2012 study found no difference in grade between Gong and Hou.

=== Bo ===
Bo (伯; bó) is generically a birth order term, signifying the eldest son. The most senior male of their lineage line was called Bo, which can be roughly encapsulated by the translation Elder.

The most senior male members of ancestral temples with a different surname than the royal house were called Bo, as well as the most senior male members of the cadet lineages of the same ancestral temple surname as the royal house. Although these men had land and power, their relationship to the aristocracy was foremost conceptualized as one of extended kinship.

In the old Zhou homeland, less senior members of their lineage branch referred to themselves by the appropriate birth order term: 仲; zhōng; 'second', 叔; shū; 'younger', or 季; jī; 'youngest'.

Complicating matters, the rulers of some smaller polities such as Qin, Zheng, and Cao were also called Bo, in which case the term did have overtly political meaning.

=== Zi ===
Zi (子; zǐ) carried a number of meanings highly dependent upon use case. Its base meaning is "child" or "son". The sons of rulers could be referred to with zi appended to their personal name. In this sense, zi also appeared in compound words such as Wangzi or Gongzi, where it has the meaning of scion. Living rulers could be referred to as Zi while still in their ritually stipulated mourning periods for their recently deceased fathers.

More frequently, zi signifies a sense of respect. It is commonly found appended to the names of nobles when they are referred to posthumously. This use found its way to the names of influential thinkers of later periods, giving us Kongzi (Confucius), Laozi (Lao Tzu), Zhuangzi, and many others. In this sense, it has been fruitfully rendered as master, and lent its name in this sense to an entire literary genre. Zi could also be prepended to a person's courtesy name, as in the case of the Zheng statesman Zichan, or of Zilu, disciple of Confucius. In this sense, it can be conceptualized as carrying the meaning Sir, or "the Honourable". Zi was also used as a polite second-person pronoun, also translated sir or rarely, madam.

Saliently, Zi was also used to refer to rulers of polities outside the Zhou cultural sphere, such as Chu, Wu, and Yue. In this sense, it had the meaning Ruler or unratified lord, in that the Zhou king did not recognize the ruler's sovereignty. In most cases (including all three examples), these men referred to themselves as King (王; wáng).

As a final wrinkle to understanding this word in this topic area, it was also the lineage surname of the kings of the preceding Shang dynasty. It has many other meanings in Chinese, some quite ancient.

=== Other ===
The noble title Nan (男; nán), with the base meaning "male" or "adult human male", is attested in two cases of rulers of Zhou cultural polities: Xu (許) and Su (宿). A 2012 study found no difference in grade between Zi and Nan.

The title Dian (甸; diàn) appears in the received literature, but is not epigraphically attested as a title as of 2008. It does appear as a common noun.

Wang (王; wáng; 'King') was also sometimes used as a self-identifier of rulers within the Zhou homeland whose position in the ancestral temple kinship group was senior to that of the Zhou royal ancestor, King Wen. In this case, the polity in question was neither entirely within the cultural sphere nor completely distinct from it, but the adoption of the title Wang signified that it did not recognize royal authority over it.

== Eastern Zhou ==
The political upheavals that marked the boundary between the two halves of the Zhou dynasty saw central authority and power dramatically weaken, and the movement of people out of the old Zhou homeland has been archaeologically established. Culture groups outside the Zhou sphere began to adopt pieces of state apparatus similar to those used by the Zhou, and refer to themselves in the same kind of terms.

The new geopolitical situation put regional states and minor polities in direct contact with each other, where previously they had interacted mostly through the central government and their relation to the royal house. Under this new regime, they self-organized into a much more systematized structure. One individual who is well attested in this process was the previously mentioned Zichan, who both submitted a memorial to the king of Chu informing him of the proposed new system in 538 BCE, and argued at a 529 BCE interstate conference that tributes should be graded based on rank, given the disparity in available resources.

Alongside this development, there was precedent of Zhou kings "upgrading" noble ranks as a reward for service to the throne, giving the recipients a bit more diplomatic prestige without costing the royal house any land.

Archaeologically excavated primary sources and received literature agree to a high degree of systematization and stability in noble titles during the Eastern Zhou, indicating an actual historical process. A 2007 survey of bronze inscriptions from 31 states found only eight polities whose rulers used varying titles of nobility to describe themselves.

== Confucian ideal ==
It is against this backdrop of self-organizing systematization that thinkers of the traditionalist school began to conceive of a lost ideal, a strictly graded system of noble titles and enfeoffments from the time of the early Western Zhou. First articulated by Mencius, this fiction found its way into important classical works, which were subsequently canonized in the Han dynasty, becoming accepted historical truth in the process.

Under this scheme, the "five ranks" were ordered as gong, hou, bo, zi, nan. Each was apportioned a set amount of land. This unsubstantiated hypothesis survives in the received literature in the Rites of Zhou and the Liji.

In the Eastern Han and Western Jin dynasties, the "traditional" Confucian five-rank system was actually put into practice with minor modifications, finally manifesting this historical fiction as political fact.

== English translation and criticism ==
Qing dynasty Empress Dowager Cixi commissioned translations of the five ranks in use at the time into English. Working with the terminology of European feudalism, the translators gave us the familiar duke for gong, marquess for hou, earl for bo, viscount for zi, and baron for nan. This scheme has persisted in the English literature ever since.

Chinese historians, particularly those working with a Marxist interpretation of history, use the term fengjian to describe European feudalism as well as the Zhou and later systems in which peasants owed rent and corvee to landowners.

Modern scholarship of Zhou-era China has focused on the examination of bronze inscriptions and other archaeologically excavated records as primary sources to establish a more accurate picture of political dynamics. Some scholars have written at length in an attempt to deprecate fully any feudal terminology in the field of early Chinese studies, or criticize the use of such terminology without calling for its elimination while others continue to employ it as a "rough and pedagogically neutral heuristic".

== Women ==
Unlike the preceding Shang dynasty, which featured women such as Fu Hao and Zi Tao in positions of authority in military and religious institutions, the highly patriarchal Zhou appear by all accounts to have concentrated official political power exclusively in the hands of men. With a handful of rare exceptions, women appear in the epigraphic record in the context of dowries, instruments for building alliances between powerful families. Apart from birth order terms, the only noble titles they are associated with are zi, in its sense of "child of a powerful man", and more commonly, sheng (甥; shēng), a term without close analogue that indicates a relationship to a particular family, either by blood or by marriage. Women certainly wielded some power, but the contexts in which they did were not regularly entered into the historical record.

== See also ==
- Chinese nobility
- Chinese honorifics
- Ancient Chinese states & Fengjian
