= Bi (state) =

Bi 畢
- Zhou dynasty
- Capital: Unknown
- Government: Fiefdom
- Establishment: Beginning of Zhou dynasty
- History
  - Established: Zhou dynasty
  - Invaded by Xirong: Mid-Spring and Autumn period
- Today part of: China

Bi (simplified Chinese: 毕; traditional Chinese: 畢; pinyin: Bì) was a Chinese vassal state during the Western Zhou dynasty and the Spring and Autumn period.

== History ==
King Wen of Zhou ennobled his fifteenth son as Duke Gao of Bi (畢公高) to rule the new state of Bi (now southwestern Xi'an of Shaanxi). Duke Gao's second son, Bi Zhong (畢仲), then inherited the state, while his elder brother was to rule another vassal state of Kai.

Bi followed King Ping of Zhou's move to Luoyang and was relocated nearby. It may have continued into the Warring States period, and was eventually invaded and defeated by the Xirong.

After the fall of Bi, Bi Wan, a descendent of the dukes, fled to Jin and was eventually granted the fief of Wei.

== Rulers ==
- Duke Gao of Bi
- Bi Zhong
- Bi Huan (毕桓), a descendant of Bi Zhong and one of the three dukes (三公) during the reign of King Mu of Zhou.
- Bi Ke (毕伯克)
- Bi Shuo Fu (毕伯硕父)

== See also ==
- Bi (surname)
- List of Zhou dynasty states
