= Ningyang County =

Ningyang County 宁阳县
- County
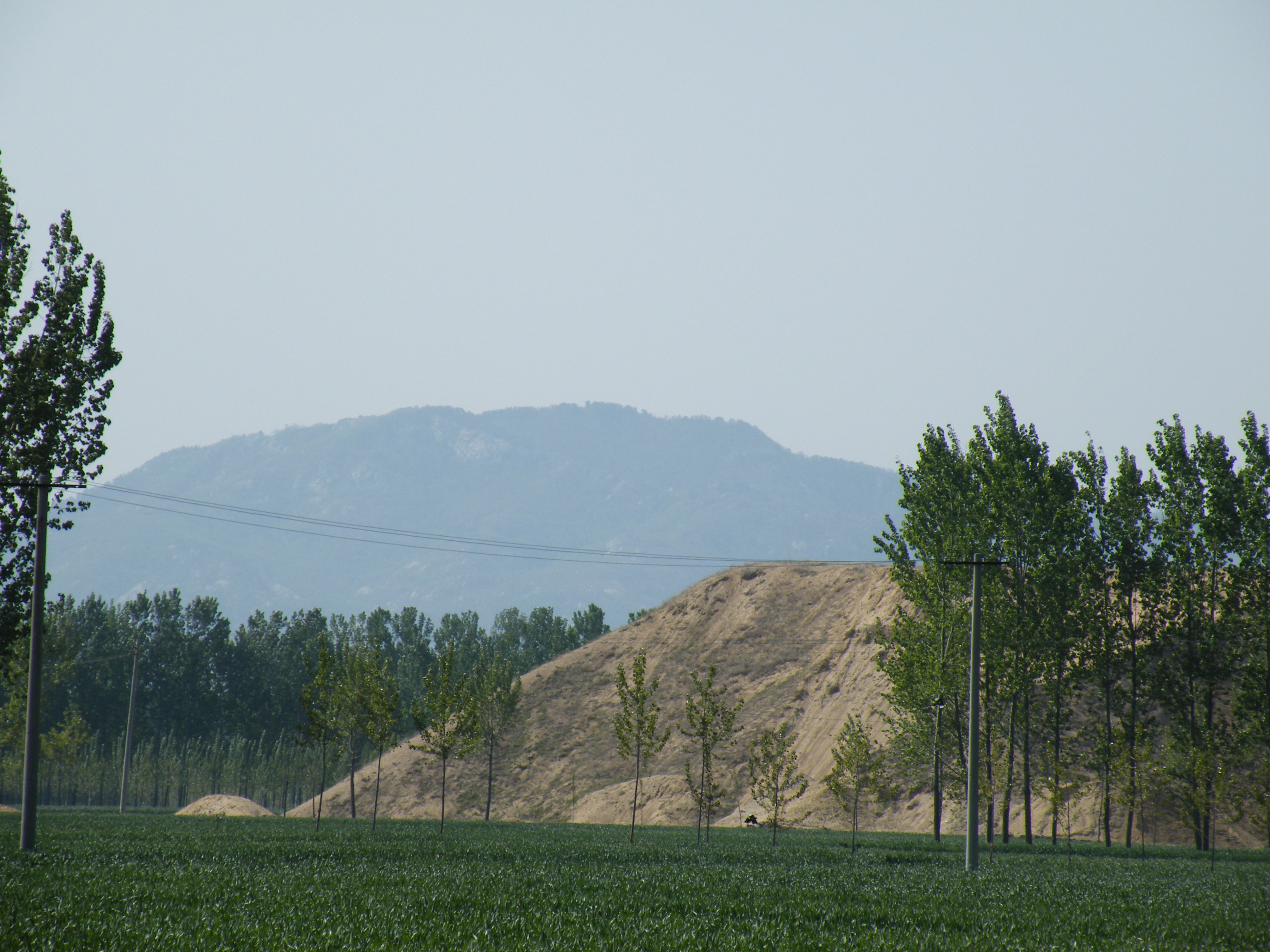
- Landscape of Ningyang County

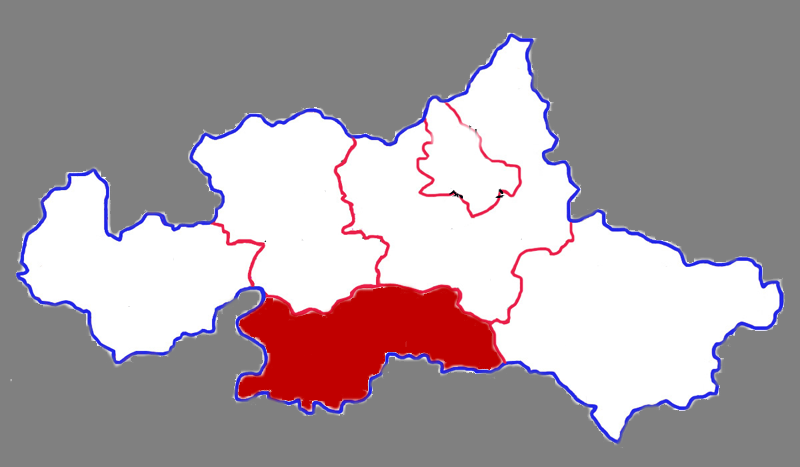
- Ningyang in Tai'an

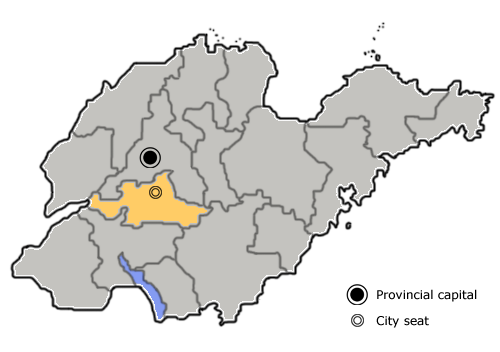
- Tai'an in Shandong
- Coordinates: 35°45′32″N 116°48′21″E
- Country: People's Republic of China
- Province: Shandong
- Prefecture-level city: Tai'an

Area
  - Total: 1,125 km^{2} (434 sq mi)

Population (2019)
  - Total: 772,700
  - Density: 686.8/km^{2} (1,779/sq mi)
- Time zone: UTC+8 (China Standard)
- Postal code: 271400

Ningyang (simplified Chinese: 宁阳县; traditional Chinese: 寧陽縣; pinyin: Níngyáng Xiàn) is a county under the administration of the prefecture-level city of Tai'an, Shandong Province, China.

== Administrative divisions ==
As of 2012, this county is divided to 9 towns and 3 townships.

Towns

- Ningyang (宁阳镇)
- Sidian (泗店镇)
- Dongshu (东疏镇)
- Fushan (伏山镇)
- Gangcheng (堽城镇)
- Jiangji (蒋集镇)
- Ciyao (磁窑镇)
- Huafeng (华丰镇)
- Geshi (葛石镇)

Townships

- Heshan Township (鹤山乡)
- Dongzhuang Township (东庄乡)
- Xiangyin Township (乡饮乡)

== Climate ==
Climate data for Ningyang, elevation 68 m (223 ft), (1991–2020 normals, extremes 1981–2010)
Month	Jan	Feb	Mar	Apr	May	Jun	Jul	Aug	Sep	Oct	Nov	Dec	Year
Record high °C (°F)	16.1 (61.0)	22.2 (72.0)	27.6 (81.7)	32.5 (90.5)	35.5 (95.9)	39.2 (102.6)	40.6 (105.1)	36.7 (98.1)	36.5 (97.7)	35.6 (96.1)	25.9 (78.6)	18.6 (65.5)	40.6 (105.1)
Mean daily maximum °C (°F)	5.0 (41.0)	8.8 (47.8)	14.7 (58.5)	21.2 (70.2)	26.6 (79.9)	31.6 (88.9)	32.0 (89.6)	30.8 (87.4)	27.4 (81.3)	21.5 (70.7)	13.3 (55.9)	6.6 (43.9)	20.0 (67.9)
Daily mean °C (°F)	−1.0 (30.2)	2.4 (36.3)	8.2 (46.8)	14.6 (58.3)	20.3 (68.5)	25.4 (77.7)	27.0 (80.6)	25.8 (78.4)	21.2 (70.2)	14.9 (58.8)	7.3 (45.1)	0.9 (33.6)	13.9 (57.0)
Mean daily minimum °C (°F)	−5.4 (22.3)	−2.6 (27.3)	2.5 (36.5)	8.6 (47.5)	14.1 (57.4)	19.6 (67.3)	22.9 (73.2)	21.9 (71.4)	16.4 (61.5)	9.8 (49.6)	2.7 (36.9)	−3.5 (25.7)	8.9 (48.1)
Record low °C (°F)	−17.0 (1.4)	−14.3 (6.3)	−9.3 (15.3)	−3.7 (25.3)	2.5 (36.5)	11.3 (52.3)	16.9 (62.4)	12.1 (53.8)	4.5 (40.1)	−1.6 (29.1)	−10.3 (13.5)	−15.6 (3.9)	−17.0 (1.4)
Average precipitation mm (inches)	6.7 (0.26)	11.8 (0.46)	14.9 (0.59)	36.1 (1.42)	53.7 (2.11)	75.1 (2.96)	174.1 (6.85)	151.5 (5.96)	62.9 (2.48)	30.1 (1.19)	27.9 (1.10)	8.9 (0.35)	653.7 (25.73)
Average precipitation days (≥ 0.1 mm)	2.5	3.6	3.5	5.2	6.4	7.4	11.2	10.4	6.8	5.2	4.8	3.1	70.1
Average snowy days	2.6	2.3	0.5	0.1	0	0	0	0	0	0	0.7	1.7	7.9
Average relative humidity (%)	63	59	57	63	67	64	79	83	77	71	70	66	68
Mean monthly sunshine hours	137.2	146.6	195.3	220.5	238.9	209.4	183.2	186.4	176.7	177.5	148.6	136.9	2,157.2
Percentage possible sunshine	44	47	52	56	55	48	42	45	48	51	49	45	49
Source: China Meteorological Administration
