= Yun (ancient surname) =

Family name

Yun (Chinese: 妘) is a Chinese surname, and is one of the earliest surnames in China. It is one of the Eight surnames of Zhurong and one of the Eight Great Surnames of Chinese Antiquity. The states of Yu, Yi, and Biyang of the Zhou dynasty are all of the Yun surname.

== See also ==
- Eight Great Surnames of Chinese Antiquity
