= Feng (surname meaning wind) =

Chinese family name

Fēng (风/風)
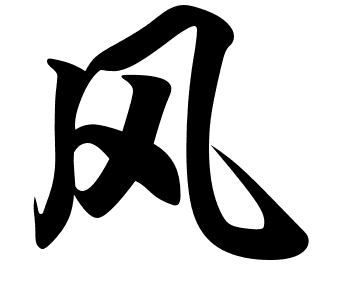
- Feng surname
- Language: Chinese

Origin
- Language: Old Chinese
- Derivation: Fuxi
- Meaning: Wind

Other names
- Derivative: Fang

Fēng ("wind" 風, simplified 风) is a Chinese surname of Fuxi (伏羲). Unlike the much more common Féng (冯, "gallop") surname which is pronounced with the second rising tone in Mandarin, "wind" is pronounced fēng.

In the third-century text Records of Emperors and Kings (帝王世纪), Huangfu Mi records the legend that goddess Nüwa enfeoffed thirteen tribes or states, all having the Feng surname.

In Min Nan the name is Hong, and commonly also as Fang.

== Surname from Feng ==
- Bo (surname) (伯)
- Cheng (surname) (程)
- Li Surname (郦)
- Dongfang (surname) (东方)

== Notable people ==
=== Stagenames ===
- Feng Tian (Chinese: 風田, born February 2, 1992), also known as Win Feng, is a Japanese actor, singer and model
