= Fán (surname) =

Chinese family name

Fán (樊) is a Chinese family name. It was the name of a fief, located in present-day Jiyuan in Henan province. Granted by Zhong Shanfu by Zhou Xuang Wang. It is shared by around 2 million people, or 0.150% of the population, with the province with the largest population being Henan.

== Notable people ==
- Fan Hui (樊麾), European Go champion
- Fan Kuai (樊噲), Han dynasty military general and friend of Han dynasty founder Liu Bang (Emperor Gao)
- Fan Rui (樊瑞), historical fictional character from the Water Margin
- Louis Fan (convert), Catholic convert and first Chinese witness to modern Europe
- Fan Mei-sheng, (樊梅生, born 1942) Hong Kong actor
  - Louis Fan (actor) (樊少皇), Hong Kong film actor, son of Fan Mei-sheng
- Fan Gang (樊纲), economist
- Ky Fan (樊𰋀, (Note: The character in his given name is (⿰土畿), a variant of 㙨. It was added to the CJK Unified Ideographs Extension G in Unicode version 13, and may not display properly on all systems.) 1914–2010), Chinese-born American mathematician
- Fan Zhendong (樊振东), Chinese professional table tennis player
