= Yang (surname 陽) =

Chinese surname

Yáng (simplified Chinese: 阳; traditional Chinese: 陽) is a Chinese surname. According to a 2013 study it was the 186th most common surname, shared by 670,000 people or 0.050% of the population, with the province with the most being Hunan.

== Notable people ==
- Yang Tung-yi (阳东益; born 1978), Taiwanese baseball player
- Yang Yao-hsun (陽耀勳; born 1983), Taiwanese baseball player

== See also ==
- Ouyang (歐陽/欧阳)
