= Ji (surname 冀) =

Chinese family name

Ji (冀)
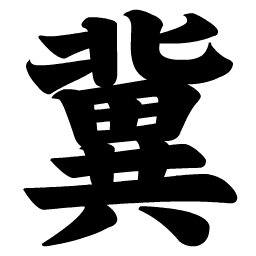
- Pronunciation: Jì (Mandarin); Kei (Cantonese)
- Language: Chinese

Origin
- Language: Old Chinese

Other names
- Variant forms: Chi, Kei

Jì is the Mandarin pinyin romanization of the Chinese surname written 冀 in Chinese character. It is romanized as Chi in Wade–Giles, and Kei in Cantonese. Ji is the 294th most common surname in China, with a population of 160,000. It is listed 316th in the Song dynasty classic text Hundred Family Surnames.

== Demographics ==
As of 2008, Ji 冀 is the 294th most common surname in China, shared by 160,000 people, or 0.013% of the Chinese population. It is concentrated in the provinces of Shanxi, Hebei, Shandong, and Henan. Shanxi has the highest number of people with the surname, accounting for 29% of the total.

== Origins ==
According to tradition, there are three main origins of the Ji 冀 surname:

1. According to the Song dynasty text Lushi, King Wu of Zhou (reigned 1046–1043 BC) enfeoffed a descendant of Emperor Yao at the state of Ji 冀, located in present-day Jishan or Anze County, Shanxi province. During the Spring and Autumn period, Ji was conquered by the neighbouring state of Jin, a major power of the time. The people of Ji subsequently adopted the name of their former state as their surname.

2. After Jin conquered the state of Ji, the Duke of Jin enfeoffed his minister Xi Rui (郤芮, died 636 BC) at Ji, Xi Rui was subsequently also called Ji Rui, and his descendants adopted the name of his fief as their surname.

3. A third origin of the Ji surname is the state of Song of the Zhou dynasty. A branch of the ruling house of Song adopted Ji as their surname, and this source of Ji is a branch of Zi, the ancestral name of the lords of Song.

== Notable people ==
- Ji Yuanheng (冀元亨; 1482–1521), Ming dynasty official
- Ji Ruxi (冀如錫; 1613–1686), Qing dynasty Minister of War
- The Ji brothers of Shanxi:
  - Ji Chaoding (冀朝鼎; 1903–1963), economist
  - Chao-Li Chi (冀朝理; 1927–2010), Chinese-American actor
  - Ji Chaozhu (冀朝铸; 1929–2020), Chinese ambassador to the UK and Under-Secretary-General of the United Nations
- Ji Chunguang (冀春光; 1918–2013), Vice Governor of Qinghai province
- Ji Chuntang (冀纯堂; born 1953), former mayor of Shijiazhuang
- Ji Wenlin (冀文林; born 1966), former Vice Governor of Hainan province
