= Yao (surname) =

- Yao surname in regular script
- Pronunciation: Yáo (Pinyin); Iâu (Pe̍h-ōe-jī)
- Language: Chinese

Origin
- Language: Old Chinese
- Origin: Henan Fan County or Shandong

Other names
- Variant forms: Yao (Mandarin); Yiu (Cantonese); Lao, Lau, Yeow (Hokkien); Diêu, Dao (Vietnamese); Yo (Korean); Yō (Japanese)

Yao (Chinese: 姚; pinyin: Yáo), also romanized as Yiu in Cantonese, is one of the most ancient Chinese surnames, the "Eight Great Xings of High Antiquity". It is also unique that, along with Jiang 姜 it is still in common use in the modern day. It is listed 101st in the Hundred Family Surnames, and as the 51st most common surname in Mainland China.

== Alternate spellings ==
- Mandarin: Yao
- Cantonese: Iu, Yiu
- Min Nan (Hokkien (Fujian)/Teochew): Lao, Lau, Yeow
- Vietnamese: Diêu, Dao
- Korean: Yo
- Japanese: Yō
- Singapore: Yow, Yeo, Iau
- Malaysia: Yeow

== Prominent people ==
=== Yao ===
- Yao Chonghua, the name of Emperor Shun of pre-dynastic China, one of the Three Sovereigns and Five Emperors
- Yao Chang, founding emperor of the Later Qin Dynasty
- Yao Feng (born Yao Jingming), poet, Portuguese scholar and former Deputy Director of the Cultural Affairs Bureau, Macau SAR.
- Yao Ming, Chinese professional basketball player and humanitarian
- Andrew Yao, Chinese computer scientist and A.M. Turing Award laureate
- Jianping Yao, Canadian engineer
- Yao Defen, former world's tallest woman
- Yao Wenyuan, member of the Gang of Four
- MC HotDog (born Yao Chung-jen), Taiwanese rapper
- Yao Beina, Chinese singer
- Yao Chen, Chinese actress
- Yao Jen-to, former Vice Chairperson and Secretary-General of Straits Exchange Foundation of the Republic of China
- Yao Leeh-ter, former Political Deputy Minister of Education of the Republic of China
- Yao Mingming, Former member of K-pop group BLK and C-pop Group UNINE
- Yao Wenlong, Malaysia born Singapore actor
- Jeanny Yao, Canadian biochemist, technology entrepreneur and environmentalist; jointly identified a bacteria that breaks down phthalates and co-founded Novoloop
- Matthias Yao, Singaporean politician

=== Yiu ===
- Claire Yiu, Hong Kong actress
- Edward Yiu, Hong Kong scholar and politician
- Raymond Yiu, Hong Kong composer
- Yiu Cheuk Yin, Hong Kong footballer
- Yiu Ho Ming, Hong Kong footballer
- Yiu Si-wing, Hong Kong lawmaker
- Chantel Yiu, Hong Kong singer and actress

=== Yeow ===
- Yeow Chai Thiam, Malaysian politician.

=== Yew ===
- Yew Teong Look, Malaysian politician.

== fictional characters ==
- Astra Yao, a fictional character from Zenless Zone Zero
- Yao Guang, a fictional character from Honkai: Star Rail
- Ling Yao (later as Greed), a fictional character from Fullmetal Alchemist
