= Gui (ancient surname) =

- Language: Chinese

Origin
- Language: Old Chinese

Other names
- Cognate: Chen (surname)
- Derivatives: Qui, Gyu; Chen, Tian, Sun, Wen, Xue, Wang (in Qi state)

Gui (traditional Chinese: 媯 / 嬀; simplified Chinese: 妫; pinyin: Guī; Wade–Giles: Kuei¹) is an ancient Chinese surname. It was the xing surname of the rulers of the State of Chen and of Tian Qi. The Gui (媯) clan was said to have descended from the legendary sage king Emperor Shun.

After King Wu of Zhou conquered the Shang dynasty to establish the Zhou dynasty in 1046/45 BC, he enfeoffed Gui Man (媯滿) at the State of Chen, in modern Huaiyang County, Henan. In 614 BC, the Chen prince Chen Wan (陳完) emigrated to the state of Qi. The Gui clan branched to various surnames, including Chen, Tian, Sun, Wen, Xue, and Wang, in the state of Qi.

In modern times, it is shared by less than 1000 people, and is the 3159th-most common name.

It is one of the Eight Great Surnames of Chinese Antiquity
