= Zi (surname) =

Chinese surname

Zi (子) was the royal surname of the Kings of the Shang dynasty, originally from their ancestor named Xie (契). After the fall of the Shang and the rise of the Zhou dynasty, the royal family changed their surname to Yīn (殷), the name of their capital. Other names derived from Zi include Kong (孔), which was created by graphically combining “子” with “乙” Yi, from 太乙, the courtesy name of King Tang of Shang.

In modern times, it was found to be the 413th-most common surname, shared by 110,000 people.

== Notable people ==
- Bi Gan or Bigan (比干) was a prominent Chinese political figure during the Shang dynasty.
