= Yīng =

Yīng (simplified Chinese: 应; traditional Chinese: 應) is a Chinese surname. It is not a common surname in China.

The name comes from the name of a state in Henan province granted to a Zhou dynasty prince c. 1060 BCE.

== Notable people ==
- Ing Chang-ki, Taiwan industrialist, the founder of the Ing Cup, born in Cixi City, Ningbo, Zhejiang Province in 1917
- Ying Chongfu (1918–2011), a Chinese acoustical physicist
- Ying Guixin, leader of the politically connected Green Gang in Shanghai and closely associated with the Yuan Shikai government. He was one of the figures responsible in the assassination of politician Song Jiaoren
- Ying Meijin, one of the founders of Hengdeli Group in 1922, now one of the major watch retailers in Asia
- Ying Yong, provincial politician who has held office in Zhejiang and Shanghai
