= Jǐ (ancient surname) =

Chinese family name

Ji (己)
- Pronunciation: Jǐ (Mandarin); Gei (Cantonese)
- Language: Chinese

Origin
- Language: Old Chinese

Other names
- Variant forms: Chi, Kei

Jǐ is the Mandarin pinyin romanization of the Chinese surname written 己 in Chinese character. It is romanized as Chi in Wade–Giles. One of the ancient ancestral names, Ji is an uncommon surname today. It is not listed in the Song dynasty classic text Hundred Family Surnames.

Ji 己 is one of the eight surnames of Zhu Rong, related to the Mi clan, which founded Chu, a major state during the Zhou dynasty. Scholar Li Xuanbo believes that the name originates from the clan's totem of snake. The Chinese character Ji 己 resembles a snake.

During the Zhou dynasty, branches of the Ji 己 clan established the minor states of Ju, Tan (郯), and Wen (温).
