= Jí (ancient surname) =

Chinese family name

Jí (姞)
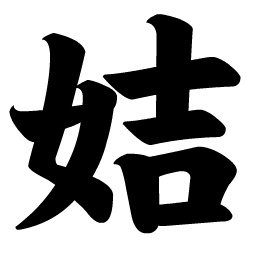
- Pronunciation: Jí (Mandarin); Gat (Cantonese)
- Language: Chinese

Origin
- Language: Old Chinese

Other names
- Variant forms: Chi, Kat

Jí is the Mandarin pinyin romanization of the Chinese surname written 姞 in Chinese character. It is romanized as Chi in Wade–Giles, and Gat in Cantonese. One of the Eight Great Surnames of Chinese Antiquity, Ji 姞 is an uncommon surname today. It is not listed in the Song dynasty classic text Hundred Family Surnames.

The Ji clan is said to have descended from the Yellow Emperor. Bo Tiao (伯儵), a leader of the clan, was enfeoffed at Southern Yan (南燕, in modern Weihui, Henan). His descendants later dropped the 女 radical from their surname, which became Ji 吉, which is now the 195th most common surname in China.

Besides Southern Yan, branches of the Ji 姞 clan also established the minor states of Mixu (密须) and Bi (偪) during the Zhou dynasty.
