= Ji (Zhou dynasty ancestral surname) =

Chinese family name

Ji (姬)
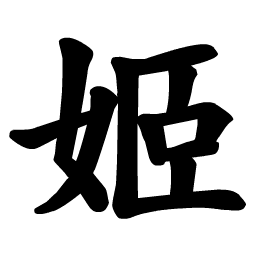
- Language: Chinese

Origin
- Language: Old Chinese

Ji
- ji 姬 in bronze script.

Chinese name
- Chinese: 姬
Transcriptions
Standard Mandarin
- Hanyu Pinyin: Jī
- Wade–Giles: Chi^{1}
- IPA: [tɕí]
Yue: Cantonese
- Yale Romanization: Gei^{1}

Korean name
- Hangul: 희
Transcriptions
- Revised Romanization: Hui
- McCune–Reischauer: Hŭi

Jī (姬) was the ancestral name of the Zhou dynasty which ruled China between the 11th and 3rd centuries BC. Thirty-nine members of the family ruled China during this period while many others ruled as local lords, lords who eventually gained great autonomy during the Spring and Autumn and Warring States periods. Ji is a relatively uncommon surname in modern China, largely because its bearers often adopted the names of their states and fiefs as new surnames.

The character is composed of the radicals 女 (Old Chinese: nra, "woman") and 𦣞 (OC: ɢ(r)ə, "chin"). It is most likely a phono-semantic compound, with nra common in the earliest Zhou-era family names and ɢ(r)ə marking a rhyme of 姬 (OC: K(r)ə).

The legendary and historical record shows the Zhou Ji clan closely entwined with the Jiang (姜), who seem to have provided many of the Ji lords' high-ranking spouses. A popular theory in recent Chinese scholarship has suggested that they represented two important clans – the Ji originally centered on the Fen River in Shanxi and the Jiang around the Wei River in Shaanxi – whose union produced the Zhou state ruled by Old Duke Danfu, although the theory remains problematic.

In the family hymns recorded in the Classic of Poetry, the Ji (姬) family is traced from the miraculous birth of the Xia dynasty culture hero and court official Houji caused by his mother's stepping into a footprint left by the supreme god Shangdi. The Records of the Grand Historian instead make Houji the son of the Emperor Ku, descendant of Yellow Emperor.

It is sometimes listed as one of the Eight Great Surnames of Chinese Antiquity, replacing Ren when present.

== Ancient rulers with the surname ==
- Kings of the Zhou dynasty
- Rulers of the State of Wu, who claimed descent from Taibo
- Rulers of Eastern Guo and Western Guo, descended from Jili's two younger sons, Zhong of (Eastern) Guo and Shu of (Western) Guo
- Rulers of Han, descended from a son of King Wen of Zhou
- Rulers of Teng, descended from Shu Xiu of Cuo (Teng), a son of King Wen of Zhou
- Rulers of Wey, descended from Shu of Wey–Kang, a son of King Wen of Zhou
- Rulers of Wei, descended from a son of King Wen of Zhou
- Rulers of the State of Liu (劉) from Duke Kang of Liu (劉康公), son of King Qing of Zhou
- Rulers of Xing, descended from Pengshu of Xing
- Rulers of Cai, descended from Cai Shu Du
- Rulers of Cao, descended from Shu Zhenduo of Cao
- Rulers of Jin state, descended from Shu Yu of Tang
- Rulers of Lu, descended from Bo Qin, son of the Duke of Zhou
- Rulers of Zheng
- Rulers of Hann, which claimed descent from Wuzi of Hann, a grandson of Marquis Mu of Jin
- Rulers of Shen, from sons of King Wen of Zhou
- Rulers of Xi
- Rulers of Yan from Duke of Shao, brother of King Wu of Zhou
- Rulers of Cen (岑), from Viscount Ji Qu, nephew of the Duke of Zhou
- Rulers of Xianyu (鮮虞), who dwelt among the Di.

== Other notable people ==
- Ji Pengfei (1910–2000), a prominent Communist
- Ji Shengde, former head of Chinese military intelligence

== Other surnames adopted by descendants of Ji ==
- Any surname derived from the Zhou dynasty Ji-descent vassal states
- Qiū (秋)
- Wēng (翁)
  - Hóng (洪)
  - Jiāng (江)
  - Fāng (方)
  - Gōng (龚)
  - Wāng (汪)
