= List of people with surname Yan =

This is a list of people with the surname Yan (顏). Yán is the pinyin romanization of the Chinese surname written 顏 in Chinese character. The surname is the 112th most common surname in the People's Republic of China in 2016, mostly concentrated in Hunan, Guangxi and Hubei regions, with total population of around 1.7 million.

== In history ==
- Yan You (颜友), the first Yan in Chinese history, ruler of Xiao Zhu
- Disciples of Confucius, Spring and Autumn period
  - Yan Hui (颜回), Confucius' favourite disciple
  - Yan Wuyou (顏無繇), was one of the earliest disciples of Confucius. He was the father of Yan Hui
  - Yan Xing (顏幸), Yan Zu (顏祖), Yan Zhipo (顏之僕), Yan Kuai (顏噲)
  - Yan Gao (顏高), according to the 'Narratives of the School,' he was the same as Yan Ke (刻, or 剋), who drove the carriage when Confucius rode in Wei after the duke and Lady Nanzi (南子)
  - Yan He (顏何), the present copies of the 'Narratives of the School' do not contain his name, and in AD 1588 Ran was displaced from his place in the temples. His tablet, however, has been restored during the Qing
  - Yan Zhengzai (顏徵在), mother of Confucius
- Three Kingdoms period, Jin dynasty
  - Yan Fei (顏斐), served as the Grand Administrator of Jingzhao during the reign of Cao Pi, Three Kingdoms period
  - Yan Liang (颜良) (died 200) was a military general during Three Kingdoms period
  - Yan Han (顏含), prefect of Wu Commandery of Jin dynasty
- Northern and Southern dynasties, Sui dynasty, Tang dynasty
  - Yan Jianyuan (顏見遠), Imperial Examiner of Southern Qi
  - Yan Xie (顏協) (491–539), an official and scholar of Liang dynasty
  - Yan Zhiyi (颜之仪) (523–591), minister of Northern Zhou dynasty and governor of Sui dynasty
  - Yan Zhitui (顏之推) (531–591), was a Chinese calligrapher, painter, musician, writer, philosopher and politician during Liang dynasty in southern China, the Northern Qi and Northern Zhou of northern China, and the Sui dynasty. He was a supporter of Buddhism in China.
  - Yan Silu (颜思鲁), was a minister in Sui dynasty & Tang dynasty,
  - Yan Minchu (顏愍楚), famous scholar in Sui dynasty & Tang dynasty
  - Yan Youqin (顏游秦), governor of Lianzhou in Sui dynasty & Tang dynasty
  - Yan Shigu (顏師古) (581–645), formal name Yan Zhou (顏籀), was a famous Chinese historian, linguist, politician, and writer of the Tang dynasty
  - Yan Zhenqing (颜真卿) (709–785) was a Chinese calligrapher, military general and governor of the Tang dynasty
- Yan Hui (颜辉), Chinese painter during the Southern Song and early Yuan dynasties. He primarily painted human, Buddhist, and ghost figures.
- Yan Zong (颜宗) (1393–1459), was a magistrate of the Ming dynasty and skillful landscape painter
- Pedro Yan Shiqi (顏思齊) (1586 – September 1625), tailor, fugitive, armed maritime merchant and pioneer of Taiwan
- Yan Yuan (颜元) (1635–1704), founded the practical school of Confucianism, his school promoted the Six Arts

== Government, politics, military ==
- Yan Huiqing (顏惠慶) (also Weiching Williams Yen or simply W.W. Yen) (2 April 1877 – 24 May 1950), Chinese writer, politician, and diplomat from Shanghai, he served briefly as Premier and later President of the Republic of China in the 1920s
- Yan Xishan (阎锡山) (8 October 1883 – 23 May 1960), the final premier of the Republic of China in mainland China and the first in Taiwan, and the de facto controller of Shanxi from 1911 Xinhai Revolution until the end of the Chinese Civil War.
- Hilda Yen Yank Sing (顏雅清) (17 January 1906 – 18 March 1970), one of the leading figures of Chinese American society, initially proving herself in university, she worked in diplomatic circles leading to the League of Nations, and later working as non-governmental organization with the United Nations after her conversion to Baháʼí Faith
- Ngan Kam-chuen (顏錦全) (12 December 1947 – 19 December 2014), was the member of the Legislative Council in 1995–97 for Regional Council and a senior bank manager
- Raymon Harry Anning CBE QPM (顏理國) (22 July 1930 – 20 December 2020), was a Commissioner of Police of Hong Kong
- Yen Chin-fu (顏錦福), is a Taiwanese politician. A co-founder of the Democratic Progressive Party, he served in the Legislative Yuan (1993 to 2005)
- Yen Wen-chang (顏文章), is a Democratic Progressive Party politician
- Yen Ching-piao (顏清標), is a former Kuomintang politician
- Yen Kuan-heng (顏寬恆), is a Kuomintang politician
- Yen Chiu-lai (顏秋來), Deputy Minister of the Central Personnel Administration of the Republic of China (2005–2008, 2009–2012)
- Yan Jeou-rong (顏久榮), Deputy Minister of Public Construction Commission of the Republic of China
- Yan Hong-sen (顏鴻森), Minister without Portfolio of the Republic of China (2015–2016)
- Gan Kim Yong (颜金勇), People's Action Party politician, Minister of Health of Singapore (2011–2021), Minister for Trade and Industry
- Gan Thiam Poh PBM (颜添宝), is a People's Action Party politician and businessman
- Gan Siow Huang (颜晓芳), is a People's Action Party politician and former brigadier-general, also served as Minister of State at the Ministry of Education and Manpower
- Gan Ping Sieu (颜炳寿), Malaysia Chinese Association politician and heads a law firm nationwide
- Frankie Gan (颜骏任), is a Malaysia Chinese Association politician
- Gan Peck Cheng (颜碧贞), is a Democratic Action Party politician

== Entertainment ==
- Yan Bingyan (颜丙燕), Chinese actress
- Johnny Ngan (颜国梁), Hong Kong film actor and television actor
- Cherry Ngan (顏卓靈), is a Hong Kong singer, actress and model
- Yen Chih-lin (顏志琳), is one of the Taiwanese rock duo, Power Station (動力火車), of the Paiwan tribe of Taiwan's Pingtung County
- Yan Yinling (颜垠凌), is a Taiwanese-born, Japan-based swimsuit model, race queen, singer and former professional wrestler
- Tae Hitoto (一青 妙), Yan Miao (顏妙) is a Japanese-Taiwanese actress
- Yo Hitoto (一青 窈), Yan Yao (顏窈), is a Japanese-Taiwanese pop singer
- Luisa Gan (颜尔), is a Singaporean actress and model
- Steven Gan (颜重庆), Malaysian journalist
- Gan Mei Yan (颜薇恩), is a Malaysian radio announcer, actress, TV and event host, brand ambassador, and influencer

== Business ==
- Ngan Shing-kwan, CBE (顏成坤) (1900 or 1903 – 14 April 2001), was a notable Hong Kong transport and later property tycoon that ran China Motor Bus
- Gan Eng Seng (颜永成) (1844–1899), Chinese businessman and philanthropist who was one of the early pioneers of Singapore
- Dr. Yen Wei (顏維群) is a Taiwanese American technologist and serial entrepreneur

== Scholars, academics, scientists ==
- Yan Fuqing (颜福庆) (1882–1970), also known as Fu Ching (F.C.) Yen, was a Chinese medical practitioner, public health pioneer, civil servant, and educator
- Yan Wenliang (顏文樑) (20 July 1893 – 1 May 1988), was a Chinese painter and educator
- Yen Shui-long (顏水龍) (5 June 1903 – 24 September 1997) was a Taiwanese painter and sculptor
- Guy Ngan OBE (顏國鍇) (3 February 1926 – 26 June 2017), was a New Zealand artist
- Yan Long'an (颜龙安), is a Chinese agronomist best known for developing the hybrid rice "Shan-You 2"
- Yan Ge (颜歌), Chinese writer
- Yan Nieng (颜宁), is a structural biologist researcher
- Yan Tung-Mow (顏東茂) is a Taiwanese-born American physicist, who has specialized in theoretical particle physics
- Catherine Yan (颜华菲), Chinese and American mathematician
- Yen Ching-hwang (顏清湟), is a historian of China and an Emeritus professor at the University of Adelaide
- Gan Wee Teck (颜维德), Malaysian mathematician

== Sport ==
- Yan Junling (颜骏凌), Chinese football goalkeeper
- Yan Bingtao (颜丙涛), Chinese snooker player
- Yan Ni (颜妮), is a Chinese female volleyball player
- Yan Ting (颜婷) is a Chinese freestyle skier
- Ngan Lok Fung (顏樂楓), Hong Kong football midfielder
- Ngan Cheuk Pan (顏卓彬), is a Hong Kong professional footballer
- Kevin Ngan (顏冠一), Hong Kong fencer
- Yen Hsing-su (顏行書), also known as Johnny Yen, Taiwanese basketball player
- Sebra Yen (颜少博), is a Taiwanese-American figure skater who competes internationally for Taiwan in men's singles
- Jeremy Gan (颜偉德), is a Malaysian former badminton player, who now works as a badminton coach
- James Gan Teik Chai (颜德财), is a Malaysian badminton player
- Brendan Gan (颜兴龙), is a professional footballer
- Heidi Gan (颜海蒂), is a Malaysian distance swimmer

== Fictional characters ==
- Yan Liang (顔良), fictitious story about Guan Yu slaying Yan Liang (顔良) and Wen Chou in Romance of the Three Kingdoms
- Yan Yuan (顏垣), is the chief of the Earth Banner Faction in wuxia novel The Heaven Sword and Dragon Saber

== Other ==
- Yan Jingang (顏金港), was a captain of Taiwanese fishing vessel MV Tai Ching 21 which was found empty and gutted by fire in 2008 near Kiribati
- Yan Ganhui (颜赣辉), was a CCP secretary of Yichun. In 2021, he was sentenced to 11 years in prison for bribery.

== See also ==
- Yan (surname 顏)
