= Yan (surname) =

Yan is a surname in several languages and the pinyin romanization for several Chinese surnames, including "严 (嚴)", "晏 (晏)", "偃 (偃)", "颜 (顏)", "言 (言)", "燕 (燕)", "阎 (閻)", "闫 (閆)", "鄢 (鄢)" in simplified (traditional) form.

These characters are romanised as Yen in the Wade–Giles romanization system which was commonly used before the early 80s. As such, individuals and institutions who had to romanize their Chinese names prior to that time, such as when having their books translated or publishing manuscripts outside of China, used "Yen" instead of "Yan". Such examples include Yenching University and the Harvard-Yenching Institute. The Yan surname in Taiwan is mostly spelled as Yen since only until recently has the government approved the use of pinyin romanization of names. The Cantonese romanization of these surnames is "Yim". As such, most people from Hong Kong and Chinese diaspora that emigrated prior to 1949 from Guangdong use the name Yim.

On many occasions, the surname "甄 (甄)" is also romanized as Yan in Cantonese. This name in Mandarin is romanized as Zhēn, see Zhen (surname).

Yan is also an alternative spelling of the Breton name Yann.

== Latin alphabet ==
- Amanda Yan (born 1988), Canadian athlete, in wheelchair basketball and other sports
- Esteban Yan (born 1975), Dominican baseball pitcher
- Jefry Yan (born 1996), Dominican baseball pitcher
- Yan Ning (born 1977), Chinese biologist
- Lara Yan, Georgian model
- Martin Yan (born 1948), Chinese-Canadian/American television chef
- Petr Yan (born 1993), Russian two-time and current UFC Bantamweight Champion
- Rico Yan (1975–2002), Filipino actor
- Vasily Yan (1875–1954), Russian writer

== 閆 ==
Yan (simplified Chinese: 闫; traditional Chinese: 閆), pinyin Yán, originated as a variant of the surname 閻.

== 顏 ==
Yan You was the first king of the Xiao Zhu and was originally known as Cao You. His ancestor was called Yan An who inherited a piece of land, which later flourished into the Zhu kingdom, a feudal state of Lu. According to the judicial rules of that time, Cao You had to give up his surname in order to ascend the throne. He adopted his father Yi Fu's style name Bo Yan. From then on Cao You was known as Yan You. This officially made Yan You the first Yan in Chinese history. Yan An was the son of Luzhong (陸終), grandson of Zhurong clan and Wuhui (吳回). Zhurong was said to be the son of Gaoyang (also known as Zhuanxu), a sky god. Zhuanxu was a grandson of the Yellow Emperor. Yan ( surname) in Vietnamese is Nhan.

== 晏 ==
晏 is a typical Han surname.

== 延 ==
延 is a Chinese surname. It has various origins:

- during the Han dynasty, Xirong (西戎) the Loufan (樓煩) get surname Yan (延), branch of Pan (surname) (潘)
- during the Northern Wei (北魏), Emperor Xiaowen (孝文帝) family get surname Yan (延)
- during the Northern Wei (北魏), Xianbei noble's three-syllable surname was reduced to Yan (延)
- during the Ancient, Yue people (越族) Baiyue (百越) get surname Yan (延) in Zhejiang the old Wu (state)

== 燕 ==
燕 is a Chinese surname. It has various origins:

- during the Ancient China, Ji (姞) family get surname Yan (燕) with title of Nanyan (state) (南燕國)
- during the Zhou dynasty, Ji (姬) family get surname Yan (燕) with title of Yan (state) (燕國)
- during the Three Kingdoms period, Wuhuan people use surname Yan (燕)
- Chinese Murong family get surname Yan (燕) with title of Former Yan (前燕)

== Burmese (ရန်ရ) ==
ရန်ရ
- Romanization: Yan

- Yan Aung Kyaw (born 1989), Burmese footballer for Myanmar national football team
- Yan Aung Win (born 1992), Burmese footballer for Myanmar national football team
- Yan Paing (born 1983), Burmese footballer for Myanmar national football team
- Yan Yan Chan, Burmese singer
