= Zou (surname) =

- Zou surname in regular script
- Romanization: Zōu (Pinyin); Chau (Pe̍h-ōe-jī); Tsou (Wade-Giles)
- Language: Chinese, Vietnamese

Origin
- Language: Old Chinese
- Derivation: Zou (state)

Other names
- Variant forms: Zou, Tsou (Mandarin); Chow (Hong Kong); Chou (Teochew); Chau, Chao (Hokkien); Tseu (Wu Chinese); Trâu (Vietnamese); Tjee, Tjeuw, Tjoo, Tjouw (Indonesian)
- Cognate: Zhu 朱
- Derivative: Murdaya (Chinese Indonesian)

Zou (traditional Chinese: 鄒; simplified Chinese: 邹; pinyin: Zōu) is the 67th most common Chinese surname, which originated from the state of Zou of the Spring and Autumn period in ancient China. Depending on Chinese variety, Zou can be transliterated as Chow, Chau, Tsau, Trau, Tsou, Tjeuw, or Chew. It is the 35th name on the Hundred Family Surnames poem.

== Notable people ==
- Tsou Chenlu 鄒承魯 (1923–2006), Chinese biochemist
- Collin Chou 鄒兆龍 (born 1967), Taiwanese-born Hong Kong–based actor
- Zou Jiahua 鄒家華 (1926–2025), Vice Premier of China, son of Zou Taofen
- Zou Jiayi 鄒加怡 (born 1963), Chinese politician and economist
- Olivia Chow 鄒至蕙 (born 1957), Canadian politician, mayor of Toronto
- Zou Rong 鄒容 (1885–1905), anti-Qing revolutionary
- Zou Taofen 鄒韜奮 (1895–1944), Chinese journalist
- Xiaoqin Zou 邹晓勤 (born 1967), Chinese biophysicist
- Zou Yan 鄒衍 (305 BC–240 BC), Chinese philosopher best known as the representative thinker of the Yin and Yang School (or School of Naturalists) during the Hundred Schools of Thought era
- Zou Zhe 鄒喆 (1636–ca. 1708), Chinese painter during the Qing dynasty
- Shuping Wang (1959–2019), original surname Zou, Chinese-American medical researcher and public health whistleblower
- Zou Taixin (邹太新; born 1966), Chinese former politician
- Ryan Choo (邹联福; born 1969 or 1970), Singaporean former actor
- Zou Yuchen (邹雨宸; born 1996) Chinese male professional basketball player
- Zou Yu (邹瑜; born 1920), a politician of the People's Republic
- Zou Yucheng (邹宇成; pinyin: Zōu Yǔchéng; born 1991), Chinese footballer
- Zou Yigui (邹一桂, 1686–1772), style name as Yuanbao (原褒), sobriquet
- Zou Lunlun (simplified Chinese: 邹伦伦; traditional Chinese: 鄒倫倫; pinyin: Zōu Lúnlún), player and teacher of the guzheng, a Chinese zither
- Zou Dehai (Chinese: 邹德海; pinyin: Zōu Déhǎi; born 1993), a Chinese footballer who plays for Beijing Guoan in the Chinese Super League
- Zou Zhenxian (邹振先; born 1955), Chinese triple jumper
- Zhenhao Zou (born 1997), multiple rapist
