= Cao (Chinese surname) =

Cáo
- Romanisation: Cáo / Tsao
- Language: Chinese

Origin
- Meaning: 1. plaintiff and defendant 2. fodder 3. division department of the central government in ancient times 4. official 5. group, team

Other names
- Derivatives: Cokro, Jasa, Laksamana, Sarana, Vonco (Indonesian); Tào (Vietnamese)

Cáo is the pinyin romanization of the Chinese surname 曹 (Cáo). It is listed 26th in the Song-era Hundred Family Surnames poem. Cao is romanized as "Tsao" in Wade-Giles (Ts'ao), which is widely adopted in Taiwan, although the apostrophe is often omitted in practice. It is romanized "Cho", "Tso", and "Chaw" in Cantonese; "Chou", "Chô", and "Chow" in Hokkien; and "Chau", "Chow" in Teochew. It is romanized "Zau" or "Dzau" in Shanghainese.

== Distribution ==
Cao is the 30th-most-common surname in mainland China as of 2019 and the 58th-most-common surname on Taiwan.

In the United States, the romanization Cao is a fairly common surname, ranked 7,425th during the 1990 census and 2,986th during the year 2000 census. It is one of the few Chinese surnames whose pinyin transcription is already more common than other variants. The Wade transcription Tsao was only ranked 16,306th during the 1990 census and 12,580th during the year 2000 one. The Cantonese transcription is actually becoming less common, falling from 7,638th place to 9,925th. The Korean name Cho is more common still than Cao, befitting its frequency in Korea itself, where it makes up about 2% of the South Korean population: see Cho (Korean name).

== History ==
Cáo's former pronunciations have been reconstructed as *N-tsˤu in Old Chinese and Dzaw in Middle Chinese. It originated from the Zhou-era Duchy of Cao founded by Zhenduo. The later claim that Cao is said to have been descended from the Yellow Emperor via the Zhuanxu Emperor should not be confused with the Chinese surname Gao or the Vietnamese surname Cao. It was the origin of the modern Cāo and Zhu families. Yan (顏) was from Cao (曹).

- Granted to Cao Guan, taking the official as his surname. It is said that during the reign of Zhuanxu, Gonggong competed with Zhuanxu for the "sovereignty" and a fight broke out. Gonggong tried to flood Zhuanxu by releasing water, but was killed by Zhuanxu. However, the descendants of Gonggong still served as water officials and held water control positions in the tribal alliance. During the Xia dynasty, flood control heroes Gun and Yu appeared again. Although Gun made great efforts, he was not successful in controlling the floods. Later, Yu summarized the lessons learned from Gun's failure to control floods by building embankments and blocking the flow, and switched to the method of dredging rivers and diverting blocked rivers (dredging stagnant rivers) to make floods flow smoothly from small to large and into large rivers, finally controlled the flood and turned water damage into water conservancy. When Yu was controlling the floods, Lu Zhong's fifth son (also said to be the sixth son) An Zheng was at the right time. He was given the title of Cao Guan because of his contribution to assisting Xia Yu in controlling the floods. Cao Guan was an official who guarded slaves in a "circular land" prison. This was not a small official in the slave-owning regime whose main function was to suppress slaves at that time. An later took Guan as his surname. This is the beginning of the surname Cao. Cao An first lived in Caoshui, Lingbao County, Henan Province. This is the place where Cao An received his surname.
- Another origin is that it is derived from the ancestral name of a descendant of Zhurong, Yan An, the founder of the state of Zhu, later named Zou, and located in modern Zouxian, Shandong. After the state was annexed by Chu during the Spring and Autumn period Cao (曹), along with Zhu and Zou, was adopted as a surname by its former subjects.
- from the name of a state, State of Cao (曹国), (located in Dingtao in Shandong province) granted to Zhenduo, the thirteenth son of the virtuous King Wen of Zhou. After the state was annexed by Song, Cao (曹) was adopted as a surname.
- Taken as a surname by the Sogdians when they came to China and became one of the "Nine Sogdian Surnames", also known as 'nine surnames of Zhaowu'

== Other surnames ==
Cao can also serve as the romanization for the Chinese surnames Cāo (操), Cǎo (草), and Cào (鄵) as well; however, they are not nearly so common. They were both unlisted among the Hundred Family Surnames and do not appear among any list of the current popular surnames.

Cāo was likely *tsʰˤawʔ in Old Chinese and TshawX in Middle Chinese; its original meaning was "grasp". It originated from the given name of one of Cao Cao's descendants after the establishment of Cao Wei. Its modern use as a curse word depends on a recent homophone and is unrelated to the surname.

Cǎo was likely *tsʰˤuʔ in Old Chinese, but had become a homophonous TshawX by Middle Chinese; its meaning is still "grass" and similar plants.

== List of people with the surname ==
=== Historical figures ===
- Cao Teng, Eunuch of the Han dynasty, Cao Cao's adoptive grandfather
- Cao Song, official of the Han dynasty, Cao Cao's father
- Cao Cao (155–220), Warlord and Chancellor of the Han dynasty, laid the foundation of Cao Wei
- Consort Duan (Cao), concubine of the Jiajing Emperor during the Ming dynasty, executed for conspiracy in a plot to assassinate him
- Cao Fang (232–274), third emperor of the state of Cao Wei in the Three Kingdoms period
- Cao Mao, fourth emperor of the state of Cao Wei in the Three Kingdoms period
- Cao Huan, fifth and last emperor of the state of Cao Wei in the Three Kingdoms period
- Cao Hong (died 232), Cao Cao's cousin, general of Cao Wei
- Cao Pi (187–226), Cao Cao's son, ended the Han dynasty and founded the state of Cao Wei in the Three Kingdoms period, ruled as the first emperor of Wei
- Cao Ren (168–223), Cao Cao's cousin, general of Cao Wei
- Cao Rui (205–239), Cao Pi's son, ruled as the second emperor of Cao Wei
- Cao Shen (died 190), Han dynasty chancellor
- Cao Shuang (died 249), Cao Zhen's son, regent of Cao Wei during Cao Fang's reign, later lost power to Sima Yi
- Cao Xiu (died 228), a distant nephew of Cao Cao, general of Cao Wei
- Cao Zhang (died 223), Cao Cao's son, served as a general under his father
- Cao Zhen (died 231), a distant nephew of Cao Cao, general of Cao Wei
- Cao Zhi (192–232), Cao Cao's son, a famous poet
- Empress Cao Jie, Cao Cao's daughter, last Empress of the Han dynasty
- Cao Guojiu, or royal uncle Cao, Song dynasty royalty immortalized as one of the Eight Immortals in Chinese mythology
- Cao Bin, military general of the Song dynasty
- Cao Xueqin (1715 or 1724 – 1763 or 1764), author of the Chinese classic novel Dream of the Red Chamber

=== Modern figures ===
- Cao Kun (1862–1938), a military leader in the Zhili clique during the Warlord Era
- Cao Yu (1910–1996), the pen name of Wan Jiabao, an important playwright in modern China
- Huai-Dong Cao (born 1959), mathematician and managing editor of the Journal of Differential Geometry
- Cao Gangchuan (born 1935), former Chinese Minister of Defence
- Chin-hui Tsao (born 1981), Major League Baseball pitcher for the Los Angeles Dodgers
- Peter Tsao (1933–2005), Hong Kong civil servant
- Tsao Chieh (1953–1996), Singaporean composer and engineer
- Tsao Chun-yang (born 1976), Taiwanese baseball player for the Uni-President Lions
- Miguel Tsao, Taiwanese Vice Minister of Foreign Affairs
- Cho Tat-wah (1915–2007), Hong Kong actor
- Mandy Cho (born 1982), Hong Kong entertainer
- Raymond Cho (born 1936), Canadian politician
- Raymond Cho (born 1964), Hong Kong actor
- Chor Yeok Eng (1930–2016), Singaporean politician
- Gary Chaw, Malaysian Chinese singer-songwriter based in Taiwan
- Cao Yupeng (Chinese snooker player)
- Cao Lu (born 1987), Chinese singer, actress & former member of the K Pop girl group Fiestar
- Tsao Chi-hung, Minister of Council of Agriculture of the Republic of China (2016–2017)
- Cho Miyeon (born 1997), Korean actress, dancer & main vocalist of the K-Pop girl group (G)I-DLE. Also plays as the voice & singer behind Ahri of K/DA (LoL)
- Chow Kon Yeow, Chief Minister of Penang
- Cao Ruyin, (1967 or 1968–2008), Chinese construction worker and deceased victim of a murder case in Singapore. His killer Kho Jabing, a Malaysian, was hanged in 2016.
- Victor Dzau, (born 1947), President of the United States National Academy of Medicine (formerly the Institute of Medicine) of the United States National Academy of Sciences
- Cao Yang (born 1981), Chinese international football player
- Cao Shui (born 1982), Chinese poet, writer, screenwriter and translator
- Daniel Cao (born 2001), Chinese racing driver
- Cao Yunzhu (born 2003), Chinese trampolinist

== See also ==
- Chal (name)
- Cao (Vietnamese surname)
