= Admonitions Scroll =

Chinese narrative painting by Gu Kaizhi

Nüshi zhen tu 女史箴圖 Admonitions of the Court Instructress
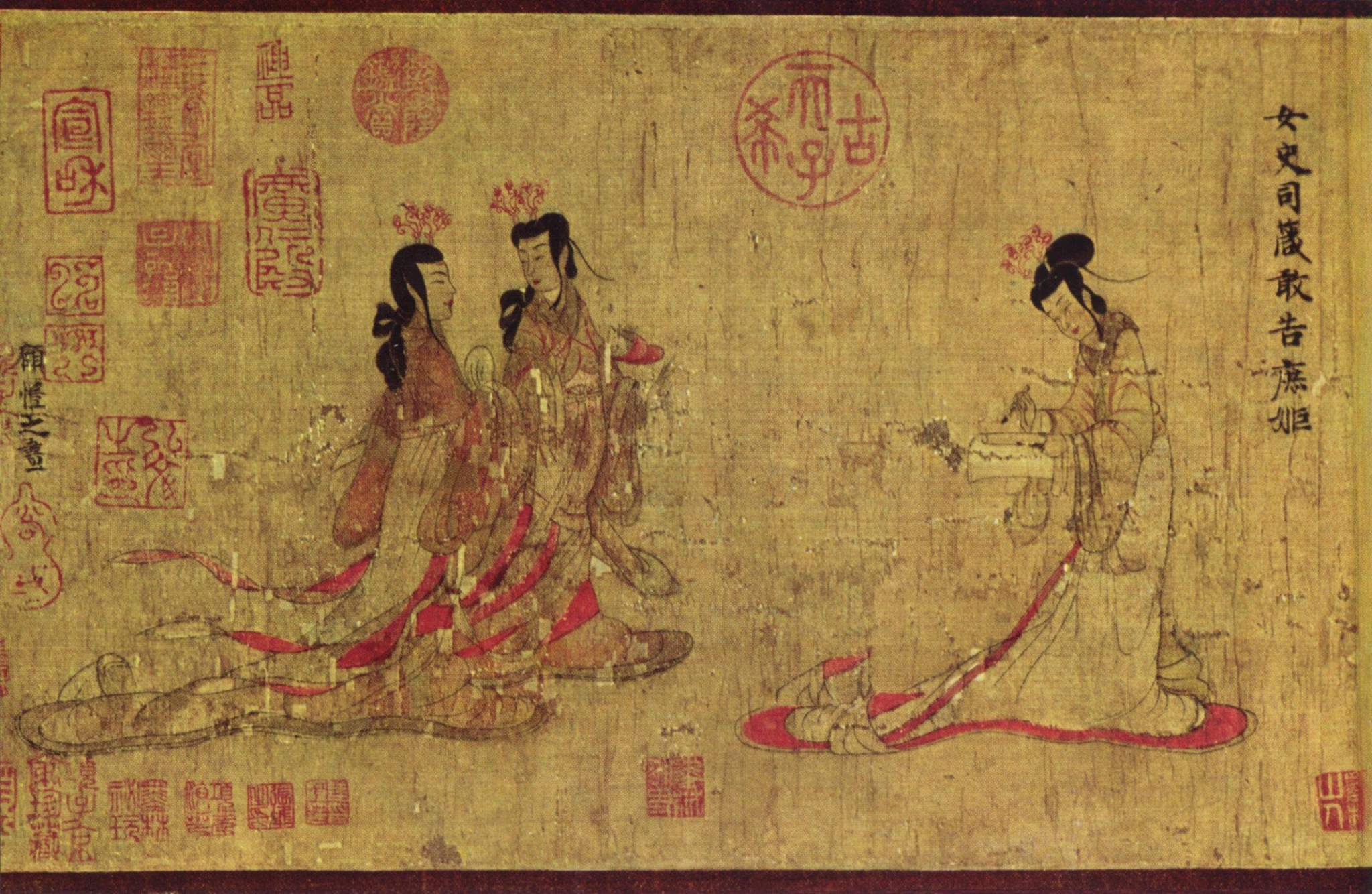
- Final scene of the scroll, showing the Court Instructress
- Material: Silk
- Size: Length: 329 cm (130 in); Height: 25 cm (9.8 in)
- Writing: Chinese
- Created: 5th to 8th century
- Period/culture: Southern and Northern dynasties or Tang dynasty
- Place: China
- Present location: British Museum, London
- Identification: Ch.Ptg.1
- Registration: 1903,0408,0.1

The Admonitions Scroll is a Chinese narrative painting on silk that is traditionally ascribed to Gu Kaizhi (ca. 345 – ca. 406), but which modern scholarship regards as a 5th to 8th century work that may or may not be a copy of an original Jin dynasty (266–420) court painting by Gu. The full title of the painting is Admonitions of the Court Instructress (Chinese: 女史箴圖; pinyin: Nǚshǐ zhēn tú). It was painted to illustrate a poetic text written in 292 by the poet-official Zhang Hua (232–300). The text itself was composed to reprimand Empress Jia (257–300) and to provide advice to the women in the imperial court. The painting illustrates this text with scenes depicting anecdotes about exemplary behaviour of historical palace ladies, as well as with more general scenes showing aspects of life as a palace lady.

The painting, which is now held at the British Museum in London, England, is one of the earliest extant examples of a Chinese handscroll painting, and is renowned as one of the most famous Chinese paintings in the world. The painting is first recorded during the latter part of the Northern Song (960–1127), when it was in the collection of Emperor Huizong of Song (r. 1100–1126). It passed through the hands of many collectors over the centuries, many of whom left their seals of ownership on the painting, and it eventually became a treasured possession of the Qianlong Emperor (r. 1735–1796). In 1899, during the aftermath of the Boxer Rebellion, the painting was acquired by an officer in the British Indian Army who sold it to the British Museum. The scroll is incomplete, lacking the first three of the twelve original scenes, which were probably lost at an early date. A monochrome paper scroll copy of the painting, complete in twelve scenes, was made during the Southern Song (1127–1279), and is now in the collection of the Palace Museum in Beijing, China.

The painting was part of the 2010 BBC Radio 4 series A History of the World in 100 Objects, as item 39.

== Background ==
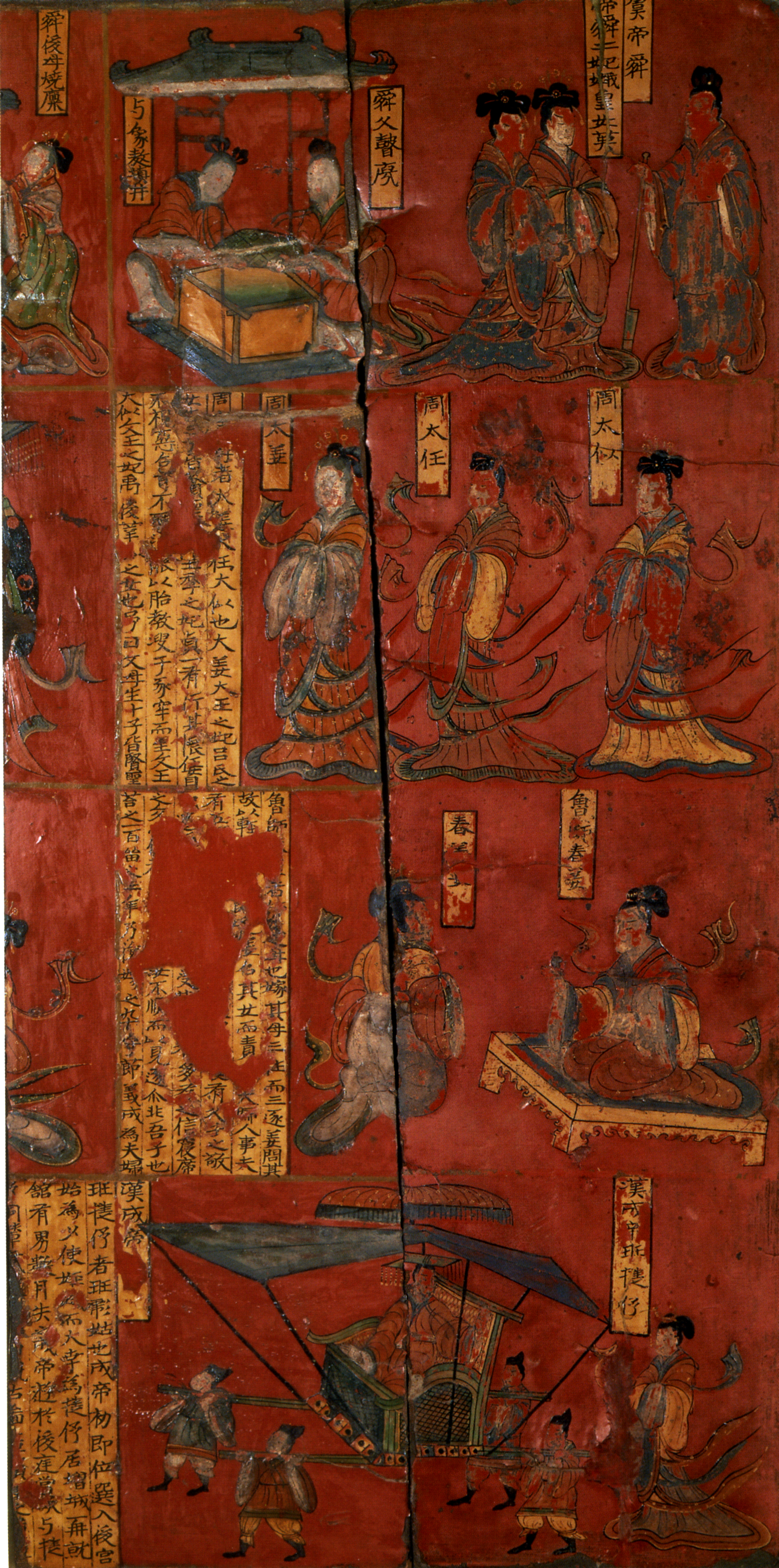
A lacquer screen from the tomb of Sima Jinlong, 484 CE. Untypical of Northern Wei styles, it was probably imported from the court of the Jin dynasty, or influenced by it. It depicts various "filial sons and virtuous women" in Chinese history; the bottom panel illustrates the story of Lady Ban (Scene 5 of the Admonitions Scroll).

The Admonitions Scroll was painted to illustrate an eighty-line poetic text written in 292 by the Jin dynasty official, Zhang Hua (232–300). Zhang Hua wrote his Admonitions of the Instructress to the Court Ladies (Chinese: 女史箴; pinyin: Nǚshǐ Zhēn) as a didactic text aimed at Empress Jia (257–300), consort of Emperor Hui of Jin (r. 290–301), whose violent and immoral behaviour was outraging the court.

It is not known when the first painting in illustration to Zhang Hua's text was made, but a lacquer screen painting from the tomb of a Northern Wei dynasty (386–535) official by the name of Sima Jinlong (司馬金龍, died 484), excavated in 1986, includes a panel illustrating the story of Lady Ban refusing to ride in the imperial litter, which corresponds to Scene 5 of the Admonitions Scroll. Although the text accompanying the lacquer painting is not from Zhang Hua's Admonitions, the painting does indicate that anecdotes recorded in Zhang Hua's text were used as subject matter for artists not long after Gu Kaizhi's death.

It has been suggested that the original Admonitions Scroll may have been commissioned by the Jin dynasty imperial court in order to express the dismay of the court officials to the murder of Emperor Xiaowu of Jin (r. 372–396) by his consort, Lady Zhang (張貴人), who was never brought to justice.

== Authorship and dating ==
Although the painting was long thought to have been painted by Gu Kaizhi, the painting is not signed or sealed by the artist, (Note: A spurious signature was added in the late Ming dynasty, probably by its then owner, Xiang Yuanbian (1525–1590).) and there is no record of Gu Kaizhi having painted such a painting in his biography or in any work which is contemporaneous with his life. The earliest mention of the painting is by the Song dynasty painter and poet Mi Fu (1051–1107), who records in his History of Painting (compiled 1103) that the Admonitions Scroll was in the collection of a palace eunuch by the name of Liu Youfang. Crucially, he also attributes the painting to Gu Kaizhi, but it is not clear whether this attribution was based on documentary evidence or whether this was simply his opinion based on the style of the painting. The next reference to the painting occurs in the Xuanhe Painting Manual, which is a catalogue of paintings in the collection of Emperor Huizong of Song (r. 1100–1126) that was compiled in 1120. The manual records the Admonitions Scroll as one of nine paintings in the imperial collection by Gu Kaizhi. This imperial authentication of the painting meant that no-one seriously doubted that the Admonitions Scroll was a work by Gu Kaizhi until modern times.

The first suggestion that the painting was not an original Gu Kaizhi painting, but a Tang dynasty (618–907) copy, was made in a book written by Hu Jing (胡敬, 1769–1845) in 1816. However, it was not until the 20th century that art historians determined on stylistic grounds that the painting cannot have been produced during the Jin dynasty, and therefore cannot be an original work by Gu Kaizhi. However, there is considerable divergence of opinion between experts as to when and where the painting was made, and whether it is based on an earlier work by Gu Kaizhi or not. The prevalent opinion until recently has been that the painting was a copy of a Gu Kaizhi painting produced during the Sui dynasty (581–618) or early Tang dynasty. A supporter of this point of view is Chen Pao-chen of National Taiwan University, who believes that the original painting must have been painted prior to 484 as she thinks that the scene of Lady Ban on the lacquer screen from the tomb of Sima Jinlong (died 484) must have been modelled on the same scene on the original Admonitions Scroll; but on the basis of what she sees as copyist's errors in the details of the British Museum scroll, she concludes that the extant painting is a Tang dynasty copy of an earlier work, probably by Gu Kaizhi.

On the other hand, an increasing number of experts have rejected the supposed copyist's errors, and see the painting as a product of the preceding Southern and Northern dynasties period (420–589). One often mentioned example of a supposed copyist's error is the apparently confused representation of the palanquin frame in the scene of Lady Ban; but recent ultra-violet examination of the scroll has shown that there has been considerable repainting over a repair to damaged silk in this area.

An advocate of a pre-Tang date for the painting is Wen Fong, emeritus professor of Chinese art history at Princeton University, who has argued that the scroll was made by an anonymous painter at the Nanjing court of one of the Southern dynasties (420–589) during the 6th century, and that although the painting was a copy of a Gu Kaizhi painting, it was heavily influenced by the painting techniques of Zhang Sengyou (active c. 490–540) and Lu Tanwei. A somewhat different hypothesis has been advanced by Yang Xin, a professor at Peking University, who argues on the basis of artistic style and calligraphy that the painting must have been produced at the court of Emperor Xiaowen (r. 471–499) of the Northern Wei dynasty (386–535), and furthermore that the painting was an original commission by Emperor Xiaowen, not a copy of an earlier composition by Gu Kaizhi or anyone else.

The calligraphy of Zhang Hua's text inscribed on the painting has also been extensively used as dating evidence for the painting. The calligraphy was once thought to be by Gu Kaizhi's contemporary, the famous calligrapher Wang Xianzhi (344–388), or by Gu Kaizhi himself, but modern scholarly opinion is that the calligraphy was probably added by an anonymous court calligrapher at the same time that the painting was made or at some time later. However, as with the painting, there are widely divergent opinions about when exactly the text was inscribed on the scroll. At one extreme, Kohara Hironobu has suggested that the text was not added to the scroll until after 1075, using a deliberately antique Tang dynasty calligraphic style, whereas more recently Wen Fong has stated that the calligraphy of the Admonitions Scroll is more closely related to the style of the monk Zhiyong 智永 who was active during the late 6th and early 7th century, and so the text would have been added during the late 6th century at a Southern dynasty court scriptorium. Other experts have dated the calligraphy even earlier, to the 5th or early 6th century.

== Palace Museum copy ==
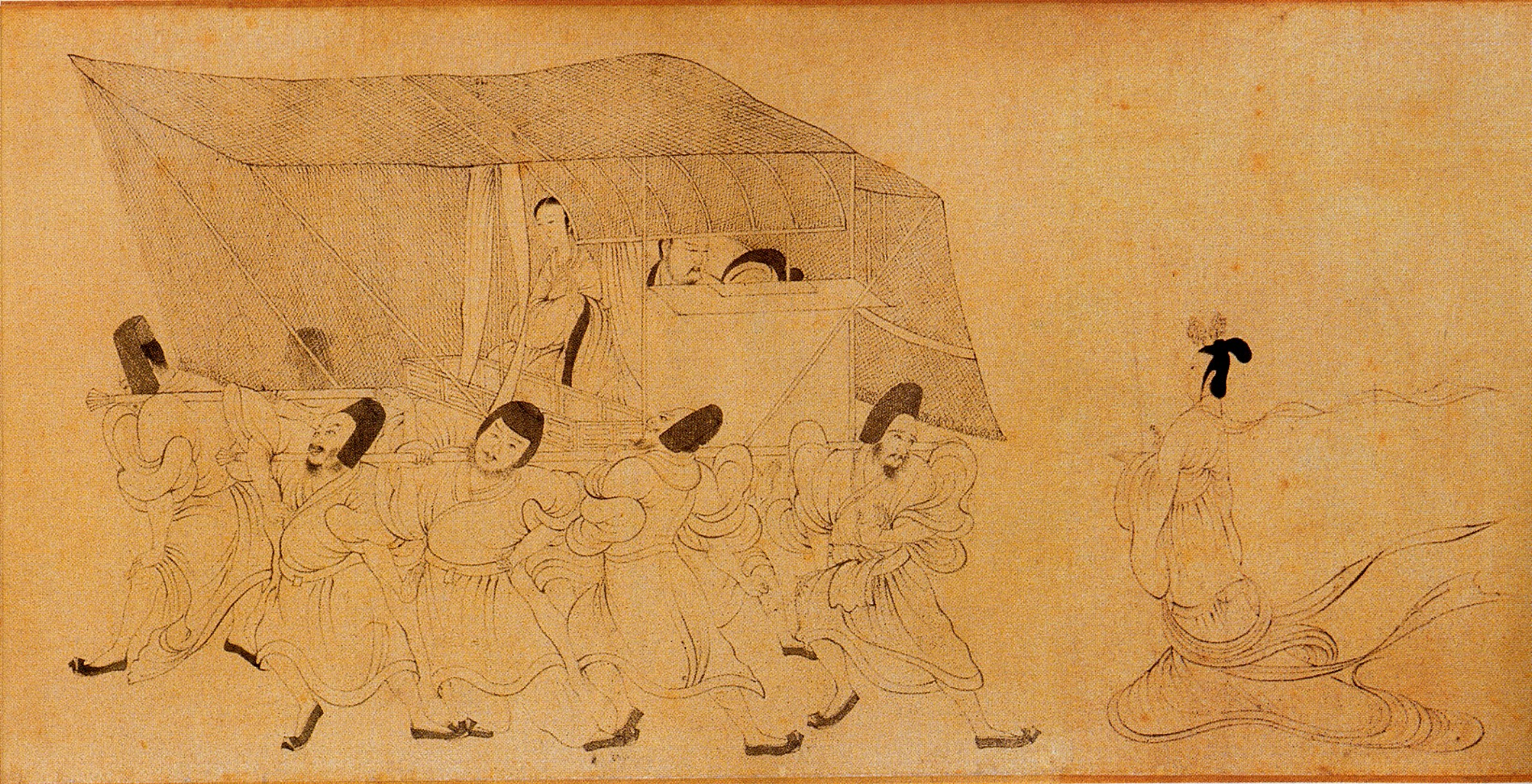
A scene from the Palace Museum version of the Admonitions Scroll

In addition to the scroll now held at the British Museum, a copy of the painting made during the Song dynasty is held at the Palace Museum in Beijing. This monochrome painting on paper is believed to have been copied from the British Museum scroll during the reign of Emperor Xiaozong of Song (r. 1162–1189). Unlike the British Museum copy, which is missing the first three scenes, the Palace Museum copy is complete in twelve scenes. However, as the first three scenes of the Palace Museum copy are not as detailed or complex as the other scenes on the scroll, it is possible that the British Museum scroll had already lost the three initial scenes by the time that it was copied in the 12th century, and thus the first three scenes may have been imaginative reconstructions by the court painter who made the Palace Museum copy.

== Makeup of the scroll ==
The scroll comprises nine scenes of the original twelve scenes that made up the painting attributed to Gu Kaizhi, and a number of appended items that used to be attached to it at either end. The scroll is now flat mounted on two stretchers, with one separate album leaf:

- The nine scenes of the original painting, 25.0 centimetres (9.8 in) in height and 348.5 centimetres (137.2 in) in length;
- The end sections and appended material other than the Zou Yigui painting, 25.0 centimetres (9.8 in) in height and 329.0 centimetres (129.5 in) in length;
- The painting by Zou Yigui, 24.8 centimetres (9.8 in) in height and 74.0 centimetres (29.1 in) in length.

The makeup of the scroll before it was remounted by the British Museum was:

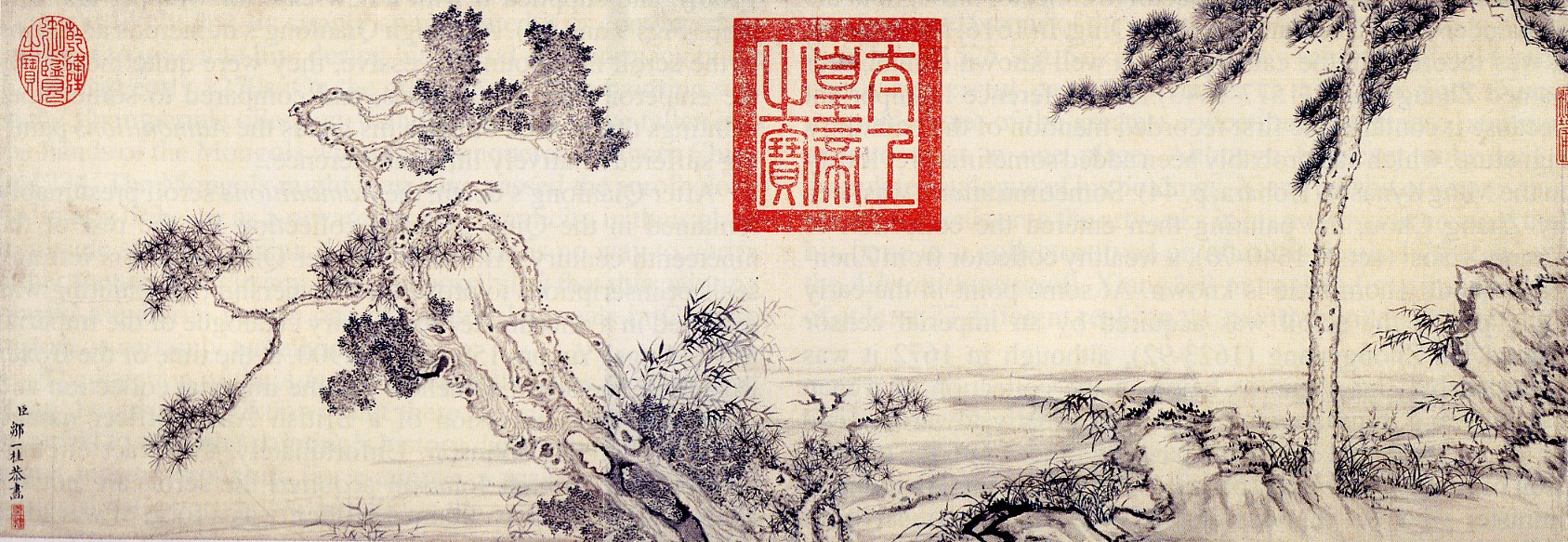
Painting entitled Pine, Bamboo, Rock and Spring by Zou Yigui (1686–1772), commissioned by Qianlong, which used to be the final element of the Admonitions Scroll.

- Blue brocade outer wrapper added when the scroll was remounted for the Qianlong Emperor in 1746, with a buff title-slip inscribed "Gu Kaizhi's painting of the Admonitions of the Instructress, with text, an authentic relic – a precious work of art of the Inner Palace, divine class" (顧愷之畫女史箴並書真蹟,內府珍玩神品) in Qianlong's calligraphy
- Song dynasty silk tapestry with a design of a peony among hydrangeas from an early wrapper to the scroll (possibly from a mounting of the painting made for Emperor Huizong of Song)
- Silk title inscription in Qianlong's calligraphy comprising three large Chinese characters meaning "Fragrance of a red reed" (Chinese: 彤管芳; pinyin: tóngguǎn fāng) (Note: The "red reed" refers to a writing brush made from a red reed or a red lacquered bamboo tube, which was the traditional instrument of admonition used by the court instructress.)
- Silk end section with a number of seal impressions (possibly from a Song dynasty mounting of the painting)
- Yellow silk with a drawing of an orchid and accompanying inscription, both by Qianlong
- Nine scenes of the original silk painting attributed to Gu Kaizhi
- Silk end section with a number of seal impressions (possibly from a Song dynasty mounting of the painting)
- Painting of an orchid by Qianlong on a piece of yellow silk from a Song dynasty mounting of the painting
- Transcription of the text on silk of the last two admonitions in the calligraphy of Emperor Zhangzong of Jin (Note: The calligraphy was traditionally attributed to Emperor Huizong of Song, but recent scholarship ascribes it to Emperor Huizong's great-grandson, Emperor Zhangzong of Jin, who greatly admired Huizong's calligraphy. The text must originally have come from another scroll which was a different size to the Admonitions Scroll, as it had to be cut up and reassembled into columns of fewer characters to fit the scroll that it is currently mounted in.)
- Colophon on silk by Xiang Yuanbian (1525–1590)
- Long colophon on silk by Qianlong
- Painting on silk entitled Pine, Bamboo, Rock and Spring (松竹石泉) by Zou Yigui (1686–1772), commissioned by Qianlong

== Description ==
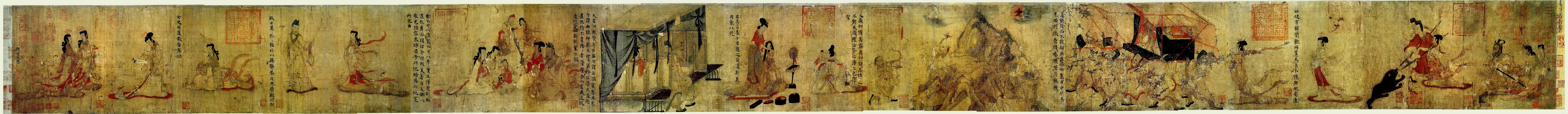
The extant nine scenes of the British Museum copy of the Admonitions Scroll, Scene 4 at the right, and Scene 12 at the left.

The British Museum copy of the painting has lost the three initial scenes at the right of the scroll, (Note: It is not absolutely certain how many scenes the original painting would have comprised, and some sources state that the British Museum copy is only missing two scenes (i.e. the scenes of Lady Fan and the Lady of Wei). However, most experts assume that the original painting would have had an introductory scene, as is the case with the Palace Museum copy, and so the British Museum scroll would originally have comprised twelve scenes.) so the description of these scenes below is based on the Palace Museum copy, even though it is possible that these scenes are not copied from the original picture but are imaginative reconstructions.

The twelve scenes of the scroll are ordered as follows:

- Scene 1 – an introductory scene;
- Scenes 2–5 – four scenes illustrating stories about the exemplary behaviour of famous palace ladies from history;
- Scene 6 – a mountain scene which separates the preceding scenes depicting anecdotes from the following scenes of palace life;
- Scenes 7–11 – five scenes that follow the life of a palace lady;
- Scene 12 – a concluding scene that shows the Court Instructress writing her admonitions.

The corresponding quotation from Zhang Hua's text is placed to the right of each scene.

The scroll before us fits into a tradition of didactic imagery established in the Han Dynasty and influenced by the great philosopher Confucius. When you read the text alongside the images, you realise that there's a deep message being communicated here. Confucius had the idea that everyone in society has a proper role and place, and if they follow that, then a very healthy and effective society is ensured. Now that message must have been especially important at the time that the poem that this scroll is based on was written, and at the time it was painted, because these were times of social chaos. So what the message is, is that the woman, even one with great beauty, must always evince humility, she must always abide by rules, and never forget her position in relationship to her husband and family; and by doing so, she is a positive and active force in promoting social order. (Jan Stuart, Keeper of the Department of Asia at the British Museum)

— A History of the World in 100 Objects (Note: These quotes are from the transcript of the BBC radio broadcast.), BBC Radio 4, 27 May 2010

=== Scene 1: Introduction ===
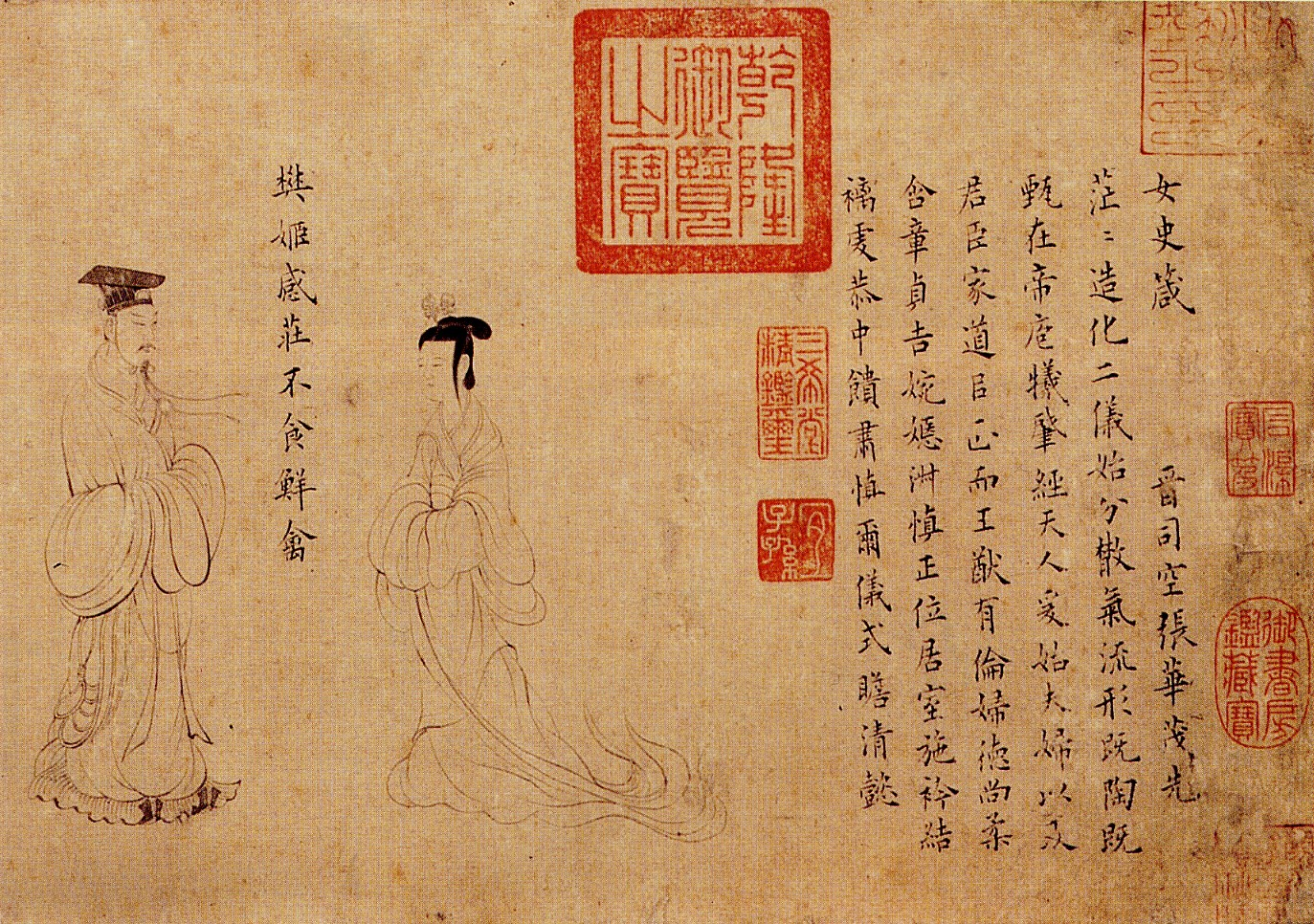

茫茫造化，二儀始分。
散氣流形，既陶既甄。
在帝庖犧，肇經天人。
爰始夫婦，以及君臣。
家道以正，王猷有倫。
婦德尚柔，含章貞吉。
婉嫕淑慎，正位居室。
施衿結褵，虔恭中饋。
肅慎爾儀，式瞻清懿。

In the boundlessness of creation, yin and yang first separated out.
Scattered qi and flowing substance were moulded and shaped.
At the time of Emperor Fu Xi, heaven and human were first divided.
Thus began the relationship of husband and wife, as well as that of lord and minister.
The way of the household is regulated, the plans of the ruler are ordered.
A woman's virtue values gentleness; she conceals beauty within, and is pure and perfect.
Gentle and meek, virtuous and careful, her proper place is in the chamber.
When she gets married the girl arranges her robes and ties up her apron; respectfully she prepares the household meals.
Solemn and dignified in bearing, with pure virtue she gazes up reverently.

The introductory scene in the Palace Museum copy, missing in the British Museum copy, simply shows a man in court dress and a woman facing each other, representing the basic theme of the painting, that is the role of women in feudal society and the proper relationship between man and woman. The image is disturbed by a line of text from Zhang Hua's Admonitions text awkwardly placed in between the two figures, but as this line should go with the following scene, it has been taken as evidence that the first three scenes in the Palace Museum copy are not entirely modeled upon the original.

=== Scene 2: Lady Fan ===
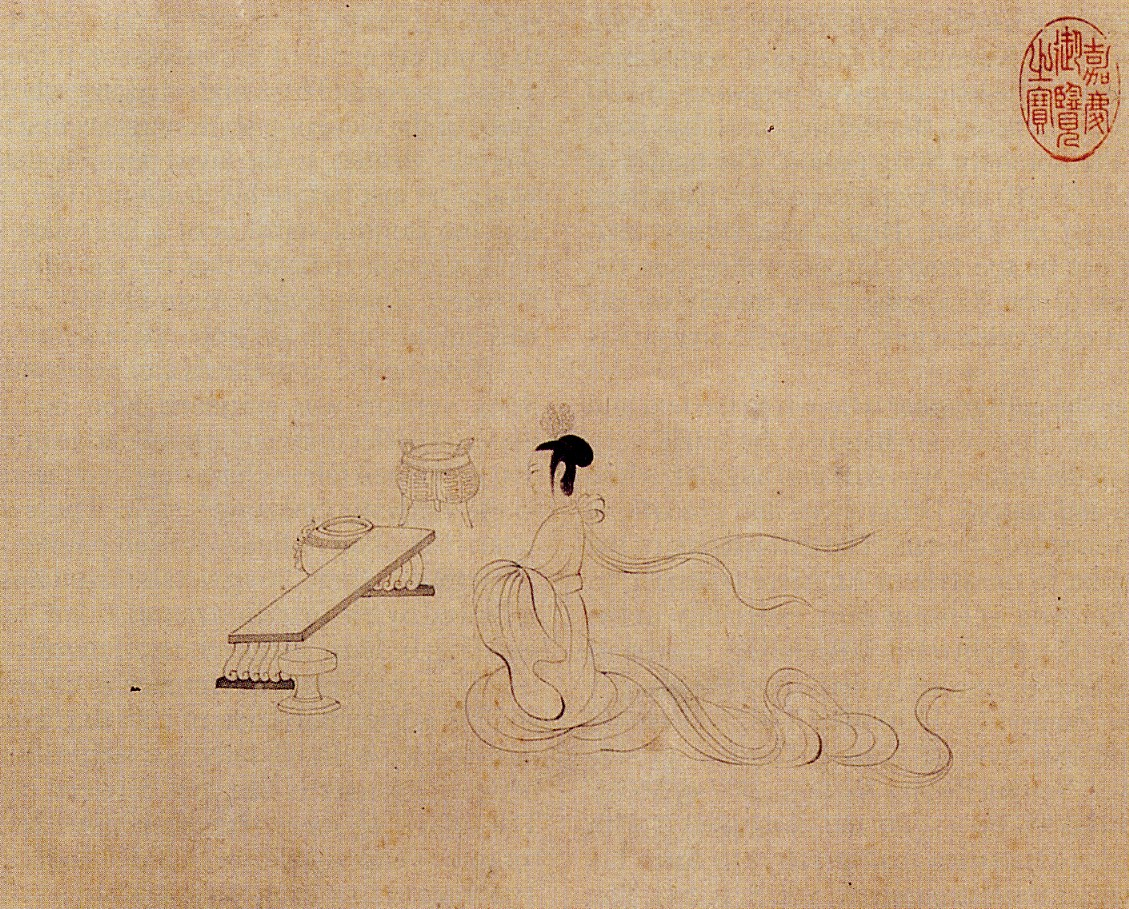

樊姬感莊，不食鮮禽。

Lady Fan, in order to move King Zhuang, would eat neither fish nor fowl.

This scene illustrates the story of Lady Fan, a consort of King Zhuang of Chu (died 591 BC), who remonstrated against her husband's excessive hunting and lavish banqueting by refusing to eat the meat of any of the animals he killed for three years. The Palace Museum copy of the painting shows Lady Fan kneeling in front of an empty table, with ritual food vessels standing conspicuously empty and unused nearby.

=== Scene 3: The Lady of Wei ===
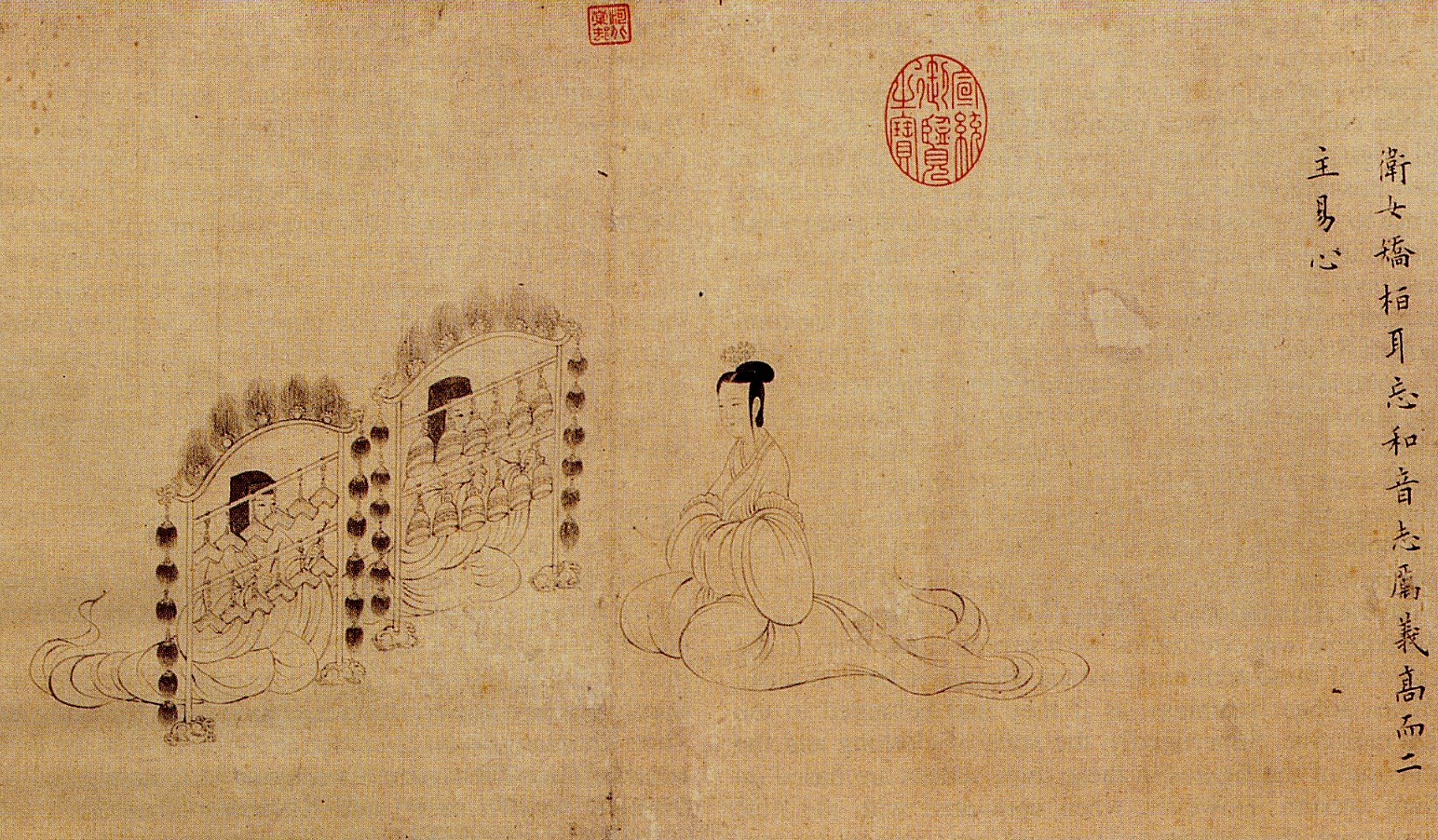

衛女矯桓，耳忘和音。
志厲義高，而二主易心。

The lady from Wei, in order to reform Duke Huan, made her ears forget the harmonious sounds.
They had strict aspirations and a lofty sense of righteousness, and so the two lords undertook a change of heart.

This scene illustrates the story of the Lady of Wei, a consort of Duke Huan of Qi (died 643 BC), who remonstrated against her husband's love of licentious music by refusing to listen to such music, even though she herself was a great musical talent. The Palace Museum copy of the painting shows the Lady of Wei listening to morally uplifting ritual court music played on sets of bells and chimes, which would have been very different from the immoderate and perhaps immodest musical performances her husband preferred.

=== Scene 4: Lady Feng and the bear ===
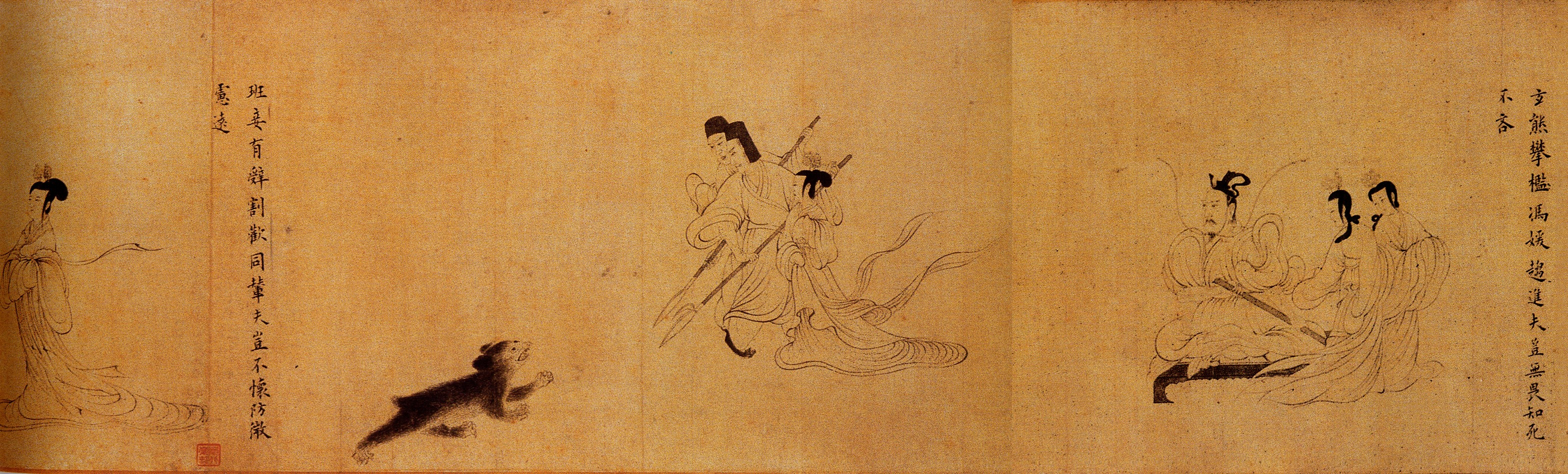

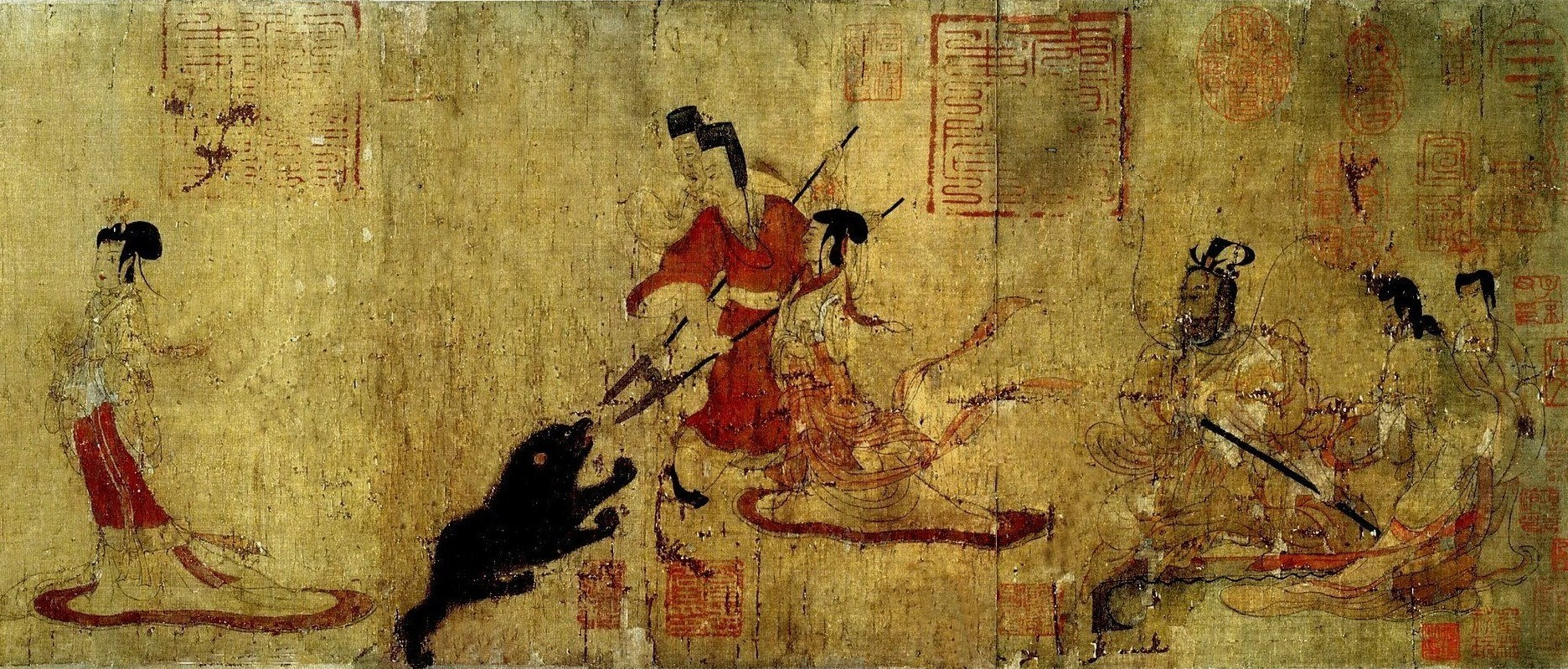

玄熊攀檻，馮媛趍進。
夫豈無畏？知死不恡！

When a black bear climbed out of its cage, Lady Feng rushed forward.
How could she have been without fear? She knew she might be killed, yet she did not care.

This scene illustrates the story of Lady Feng, a consort of Emperor Yuan of Han (r. 48–33 BC), who in 38 BC placed herself in the path of a bear that had escaped from its cage during a wild animal fight show before the emperor, in an attempt to save the emperor's life – the bear was killed by the guards, and Lady Feng survived. This is the first surviving scene in the British Museum copy (although the accompanying text is missing), and it shows Lady Feng confronting the bear, but being saved just in time by two guards with spears, and the emperor and two court ladies watching in horror on one side. The lady on the left of the scene is believed to be Lady Fu, who is noted to have run away from the bear in the biography of Lady Feng in the History of the Latter Han, thus indicating that the artist did not base the painting solely on Zhang Hua's text.

It is interesting to compare this scene in the two copies of the painting. Although they are very similar with regards to the layout and postures of the figures, the Palace Museum version (upper image) is much more spread out, with a large gap between the attacking bear and Lady Feng, which makes the scene much less dramatic than the British Museum copy. Furthermore, in the Palace Museum copy, Lady Fu is on the other side of the inscription for the following scene, thereby making her an unexplained appendix to the story of Lady Ban, and at the same time destroying the intended contrast between the courageousness of Lady Feng and the cowardice of Lady Fu.

=== Scene 5: Lady Ban refuses to ride in the imperial litter ===
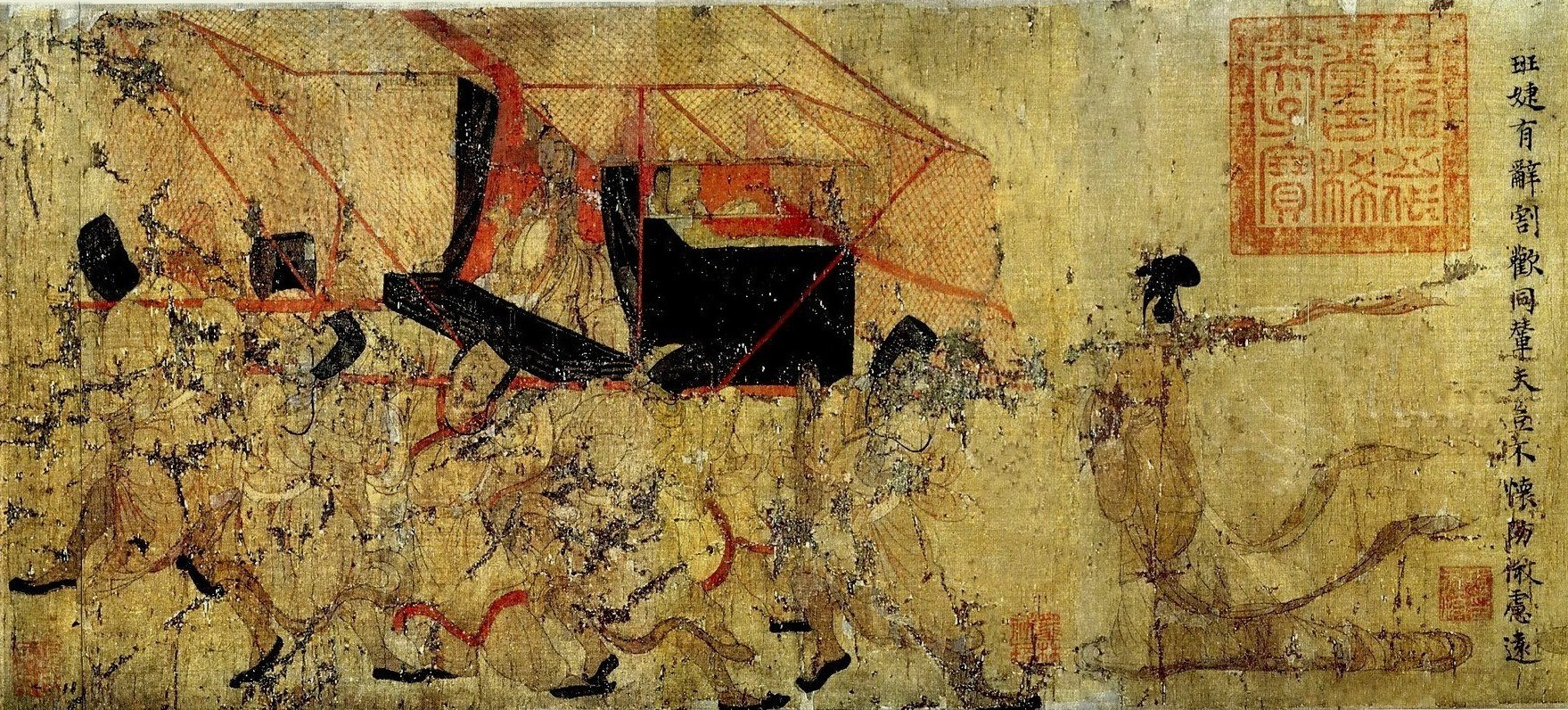

班妾有辭，割驩同輦。
夫豈不懷？防微慮遠！

Lady Ban voiced her refusal, and thereby cut herself off from the joys of riding together in the palanquin.
How could she have not minded? But to avoid the slightest suspicion she kept her distance.

This scene illustrates the story of Lady Ban, consort of Emperor Cheng of Han (r. 33–7 BC), who refused to ride in the palanquin with her husband as she said that paintings of wise rulers always showed them in the company of their ministers, whereas paintings of decadent rulers always showed them in the company of their wives and concubines, and so it would be inappropriate for her to be seen in public with the emperor. The painting shows the emperor being carried in a palanquin, and Lady Ban conspicuously walking behind. This scene is similar in construction to the painting of the same story on the lacquer screen from the tomb of Sima Jinlong (died 484), but whereas the lacquer painting shows Emperor Cheng alone in the palanquin, in the Admonitions Scroll another court lady is seated beside him, showing that he ignored the advice of Lady Ban, and highlighting the fact that his behaviour as emperor was seen to be responsible for the seizure of power by Wang Mang (45 BC – 23 AD) in 9 AD.

=== Scene 6: The mountain and hunter ===
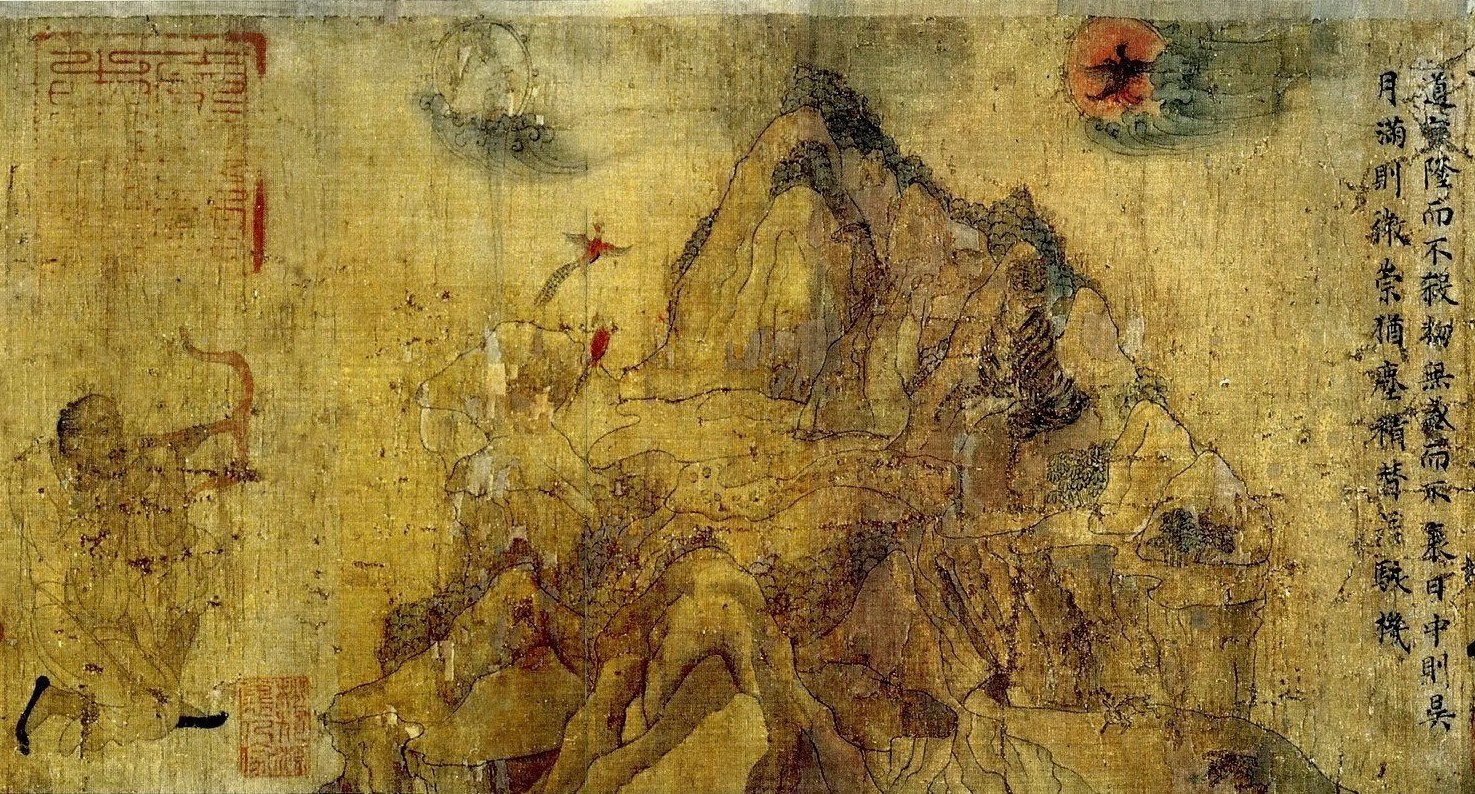

道罔隆而不殺，物無盛而不衰。
日中則昃，月滿則微。
崇猶塵積，替若駭機。

It is the way that nothing exalted is not cast down low; of living things there are none that having flourished do not fade away.
When the sun is at its highest it sinks; when the moon is at its fullest it wanes.
Esteem and honour are as perilous as a pile of dust, decline and fall are as sudden as a crossbow shot.

This scene departs from the pattern of the previous scenes, which illustrated anecdotes at specific historical figures, as the text presents general observations about the impermanence of fame and glory. The painting depicts the last four lines of the quoted text, showing a triangular mountain (a pile of dust) set between the sun (inhabited by a Three-legged crow) to its right and the full moon (inhabited by a rabbit or a toad (Note: The Palace Museum copy clearly shows a toad in the moon, which follows early Chinese artistic practice (for example on the Mawangdui silk banner). The British Museum copy is not clear, but appears to show a rabbit or hare in the moon, which corresponds to later Chinese artistic practice, although this may be due to the painting of the moon having been repaired at a later date.)) to its left, covered with birds and animals, and with a hunter taking aim at a tiger with his crossbow.

Examination of the painting under ultra-violet has shown that almost all of the mountain (all except for the lower left corner) has been damaged and repaired, which suggests that this central scene was the most studied and handled part of the scroll, perhaps due to the greater critical value placed on landscape painting over figure painting by Ming and Qing dynasty art connoisseurs.

=== Scene 7: The toilette scene ===
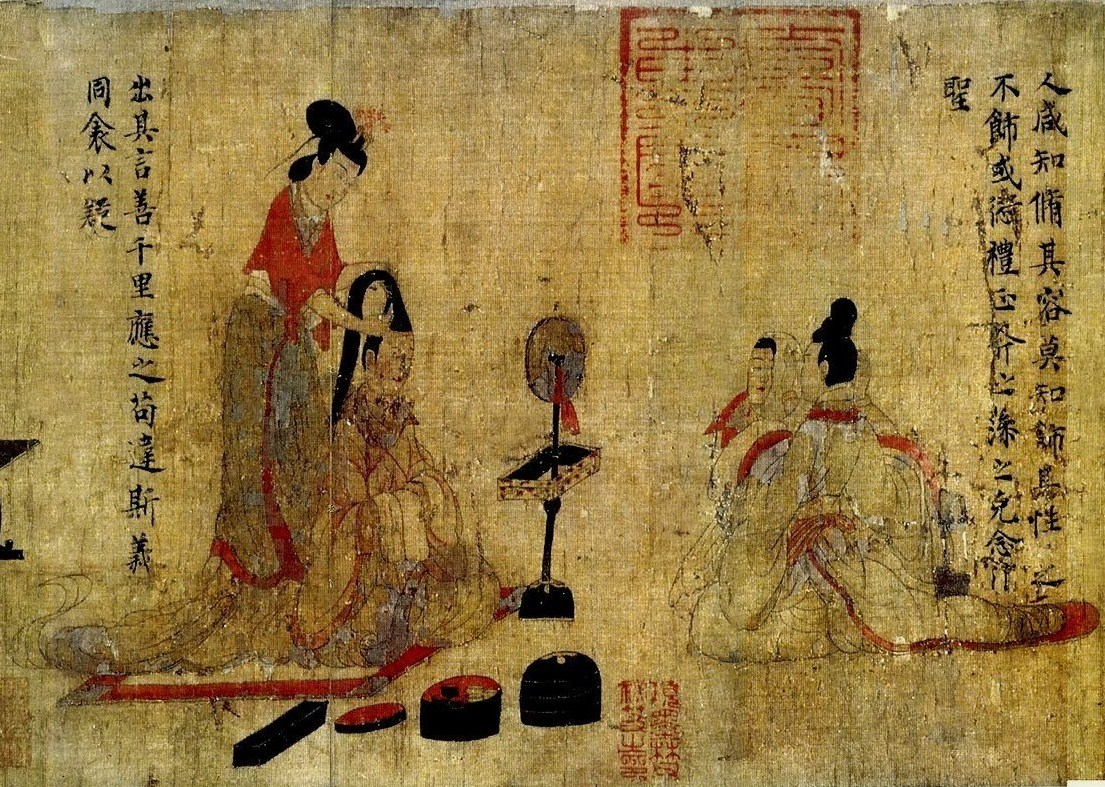

人咸知飾其容，而莫知飾其性。
性之不飾，或愆禮正。
斧之藻之，克念作聖。

All people know how to ornament their appearance, but none know how to ornament their nature.
If one's nature is not ornamented, rites and proper behaviour will become confused and erroneous.
Chop it and embellish it; overcome your thoughts to make yourself holy.

In contrast to the tense action of the previous scene, this scene is one of calmness and stillness, showing the palace ladies at their toilette. The focus of the scene is on a lady sitting in front of a bronze mirror, and with a set of nested lacquer boxes laid out to the side. Behind her, another lady helps comb her hair. To the right another lady, facing away from the viewer, looks into a mirror held in her hand, which reflects the lady's visage back to the viewer. The two mirrors in this scene are perhaps intended to be more than just tools for helping with make-up, but mirrors into the souls of the ladies, reflecting their inner nature as much as their external appearance.

=== Scene 8: The bedroom scene ===
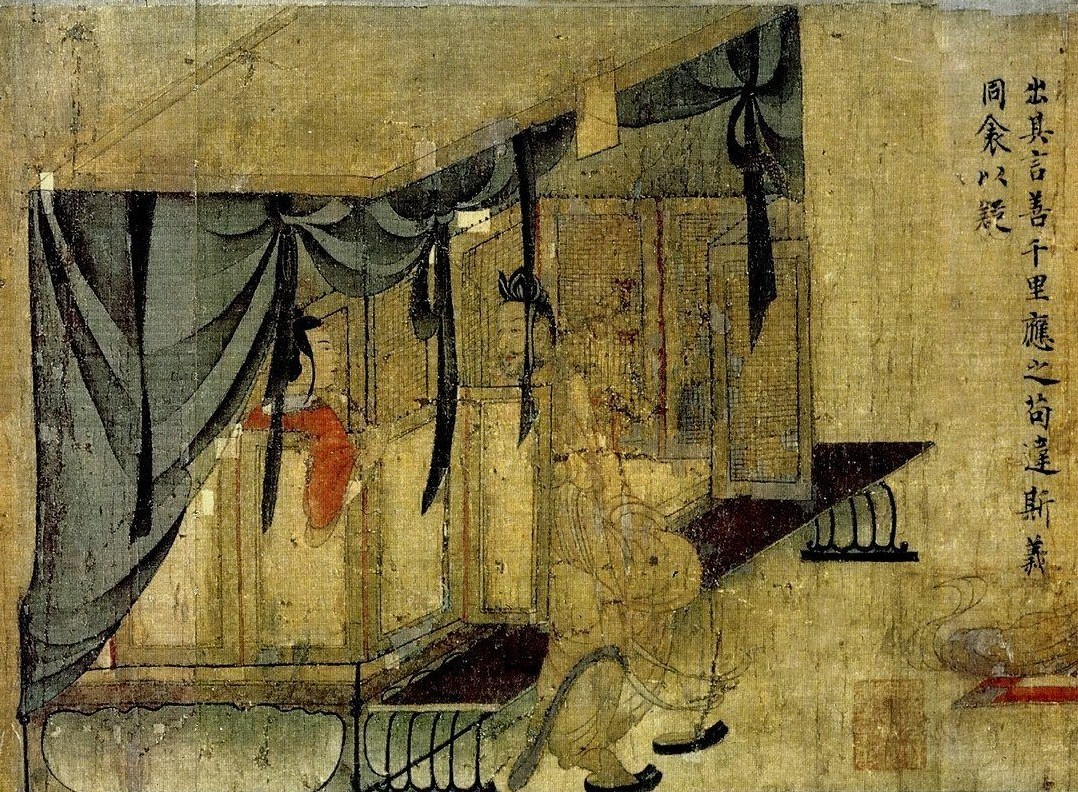

出其言善，千里應之。
苟違斯義，則同衾以疑。

If the words you utter are good, people will respond from a thousand leagues away.
If you offend against this principle, then even your bedfellow will view you with suspicion.

This scene takes the oblique reference to sharing a bed in the text of Zhang Hua as the subject, showing the emperor visiting one of his consorts in her bed chamber. However, sitting uneasily on the edge of bed, his feet firmly planted on the floor, he looks across at the lady, as if uncertain whether to enter or not. The body language of the lady, leaning back against the screen in one corner of the bed, is equally lacking in intimacy.

=== Scene 9: The family scene ===
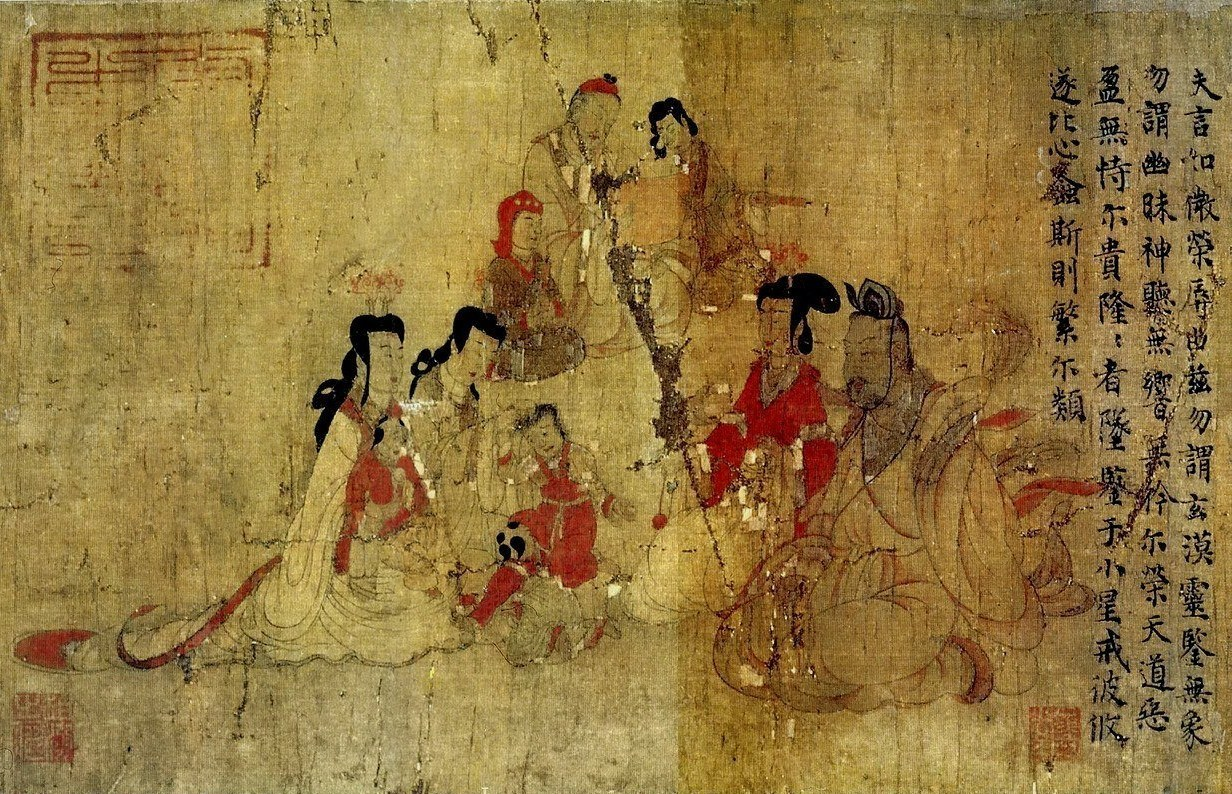

夫出言如微，而榮辱由茲。
勿謂幽昧，靈監無象。
勿謂玄漠，神聽無響。
無矜爾榮，天道惡盈。
無恃爾貴，隆隆者墜。
鑒於小星，戒彼攸遂。
比心螽斯，則繁爾類。

Words are so subtle, yet glory and shame result from them.
Do not think they are dim and dark, for the spiritual looks down on that which casts no shadow.
Do not think they are empty and silent, for the divine hears that which make no sound.
Do not be proud of your honours, for the way of heaven abhors that which is replete.
Do not rely on your nobility, for he who reaches to the highest heights must fall.
Model yourself on the lesser stars, which avoid travelling far.
Keep your heart close to the bush-crickets, and thereby multiply your kind.

This scene takes the last line of the long quotation from Zhang Hua's text as its subject, showing the emperor surrounded by his wives and children, the group forming a triangular formation reminiscent of the mountain in Scene 6. At first sight, the family group suggests stability and permanence, but the viewer may be expected to remember the earlier reference to the fragility and impermanence of a mountain made of dust, and realise that these familial relationships can collapse just as suddenly.

=== Scene 10: The rejection scene ===
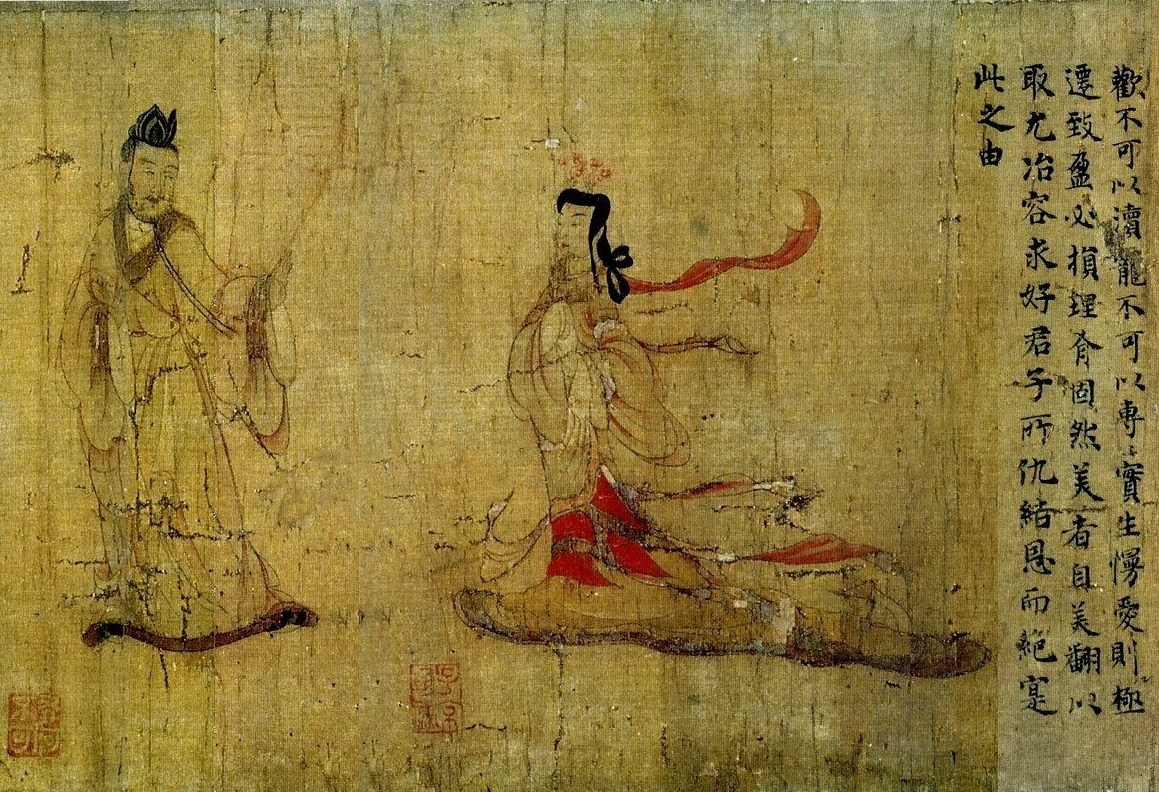

驩不可以黷，寵不可以專。
專實生慢，愛極則遷。
致盈必損，理有固然。
美者自美，翩以取尤。
冶容求好，君子所讎。
結恩而絕，職此之由。

Happiness cannot be defiled, affection cannot be prejudiced.
Prejudice results in disdain; if love is taken to the extreme then it will change.
When something reaches fullness it must decline; this principle is immutable.
The beauty who thinks she is beautiful is quickly found fault with.
Wearing thick make-up in order to please, this is what a gentleman despises.
Breaking the bond of favour mainly comes about from this.

In stark contrast to the scene of family union and harmony in the previous scene, this scene shows the emperor turning away from his consort, his hand raised in a gesture of rejection and with a look of disdain on his face.

=== Scene 11: A lady reflects upon her conduct ===
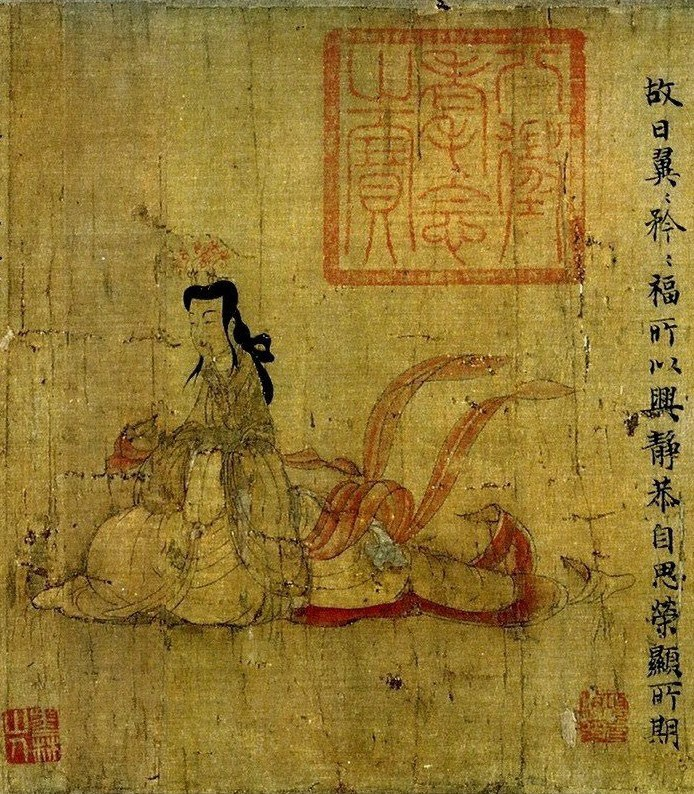

故曰：翼翼矜矜，福所以興。
靖恭自思，榮顯所期。

Therefore I say: Be cautious and circumspect in all you do, and from this good fortune will arise.
Calmly and respectfully think about your actions, and honour and fame will await you.

The previous scene showed the final fate of a lady who did not follow the admonitions of the instructress, whereas this penultimate scene shows a palace lady sitting in quiet contemplation, presumably following the admonitions in the accompanying lines, awaiting the honour and fame that should be her reward.

=== Scene 12: The instructress ===
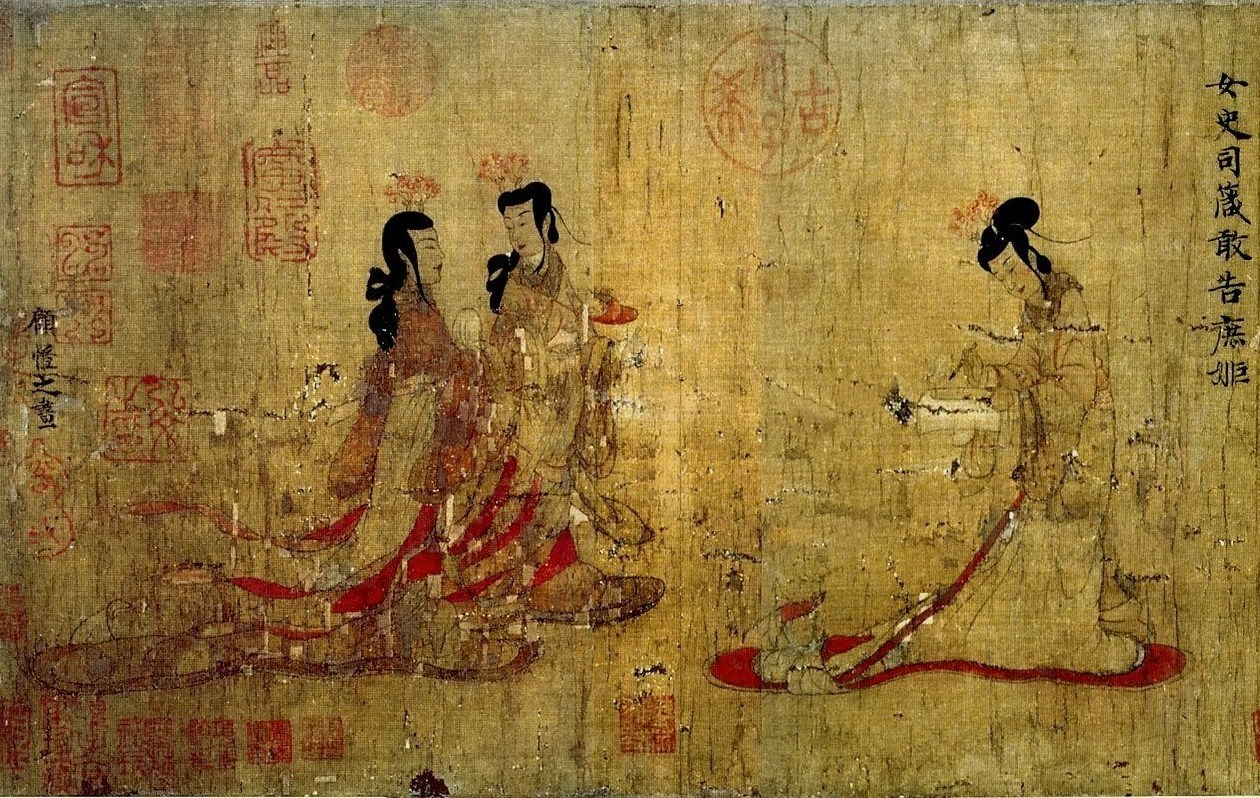

女史司箴，敢告庶姬。

The instructress in charge of admonitions boldly speaks to all the palace ladies.

The final scene shows the Court Instructress writing her admonitions on a scroll, her head bowed in concentration, whilst two court ladies walk towards her.

== History ==
The early history of the painting is unknown, and it is not until the latter part of the Northern Song (960–1127) that there is any evidence for the existence of the painting. The painting and its end sections have numerous seal impressions purportedly indicating the past ownership of the painting, and these provide valuable evidence for the history of the scroll; however many of these are later fabrications of ancient seals intended to increase the appeal of the painting to collectors and connoisseurs. One particular seal that in the past has been used to link the painting to the Tang dynasty imperial collection is an impression reading "Seal of the Hongwen [Office]" (Chinese: 弘文之印; pinyin: hóngwén zhī yìn), which has been interpreted as referring to the Office for the Dissemination of Culture (弘文館), part of the Hanlin Academy. However, there are indications that this seal may be a later forgery or else that it may be a genuine post-Tang seal added by a private collector with the name Hongwen, and so it is regarded with suspicion by many experts.

The earliest seal to be accepted as authentic is a large imperial seal inscribed "Sagacious Contemplation, East Wing" (Chinese: 睿思東閣; pinyin: Ruìsī Dōnggé), which refers to the East Wing of the Palace of Sagacious Contemplation, which was an imperial palace built in 1075, during the reign of Emperor Shenzong of Song (r. 1067–1085). The Palace of Sagacious Contemplation was built for use as a venue for state events and banquets, not for exhibiting works of art, but it is known that Emperor Huizong housed a Tang dynasty stone engraving of the calligraphic masterpiece, the Orchid Pavilion Preface by Wang Xizhi there, and it is possible that he also housed Gu Kaizhi's masterpiece of painting with it. At any rate, it is known for certain that the painting was in the imperial collection during the reign of Emperor Huizong as the Admonitions Scroll is included in the 1120 catalogue of Emperor Huizong's art collection. However, as Mi Fu records that a few years earlier the painting had been in the possession of Liu Youfang (劉有方, active 1074–1099), a palace eunuch, it seems probable that the painting was moved around the imperial court, temporarily looked after by palace staff as well as by emperors and their consorts.

In 1127 the capital of the Song empire, Kaifeng, was sacked by the Jurchens, Emperor Huizong and his son Emperor Qinzong of Song (r. 1126–1127) were taken prisoner, and the north of China was subsumed within the Jin dynasty (1115–1234). What happened to the Admonitions Scroll next is a matter of conjecture. There is no hard evidence as to whether the scroll ended up in the Jurchen north or was taken to safety to the south of China, which remained under the control of the Chinese as the Southern Song (1127–1279). One indirect indication that the scroll did not fall into Jurchen hands is that the Beijing copy of the scroll is believed to be an immediate copy of the scroll now in the British Museum, and it is believed to have been made during the reign of Emperor Xiaozong of Song (r. 1162–1189). On the other hand, one of the end sections of the Admonitions Scroll incorporates seals of Emperor Zhangzong of Jin (r. 1189–1208), but as these are not on the painting itself, they may have been added at a later date from a different source. One of the end sections also incorporates two seals of the notorious Southern Song chancellor, Jia Sidao (1213–1275), who was instrumental in the Mongol overthrowal of the Southern Song, but if genuine it may only indicate that he was given the scroll by a Mongol prince after the Mongols defeated the Jin in 1234.

After the fall of the Southern Song to the Mongol Yuan dynasty (1271–1368), an official called Wang Yun (王惲, 1227–1304) was commanded to make an inventory of the Southern Song imperial collection so that the best pieces could be sent to the Yuan capital at Beijing, but his inventory does not mention the Admonitions Scroll. The whereabouts of the painting during the Yuan dynasty are unknown, and it is not mentioned by any of the art connoisseurs of the period, such as Zhou Mi (1232–1298) or Zhao Mengfu (1254–1322). The only clue to its possible ownership at this time is a seal on the painting inscribed "Ali" in 'Phags-pa script, which may be the name of a Uyghur official who served in southern China in the late 13th century and who is known to have had a collection of Chinese calligraphy.

The exact ownership of the scroll remains uncertain until the middle of the Ming dynasty (1368–1644), when it was probably in the ownership of the officials Wang Ao (王鏊, 1450–1524) and subsequently Yan Song (1481–1568). After the political downfall of Yan Song in 1562, his collection was confiscated, and the Admonitions Scroll came into the possession of the Ming court. However, the painting did not stay in government ownership for long, as it was noted by He Liangjun (何良俊, 1506–1573) as being in the possession of the official Gu Congyi (顧從義, 1523–1588) during the 1560s. It then entered the collection of wealthy art collector and pawnbroker, Xiang Yuanbian (項元汴, 1525–1590), who marked his ownership of the painting with about fifty seal stamps. Whilst the Admonitions Scroll was in the possession of Xiang, it was seen by the famous painter, Dong Qichang (董其昌, 1555–1636), who copied out the inscriptions to the paintings, which he believed to be by Gu Kaizhi, and published them in 1603 as calligraphic models. Thereafter, the painting changed hands frequently, and during the late Ming and early Qing dynasty it is known to have been in the possession of Zhang Chou (張丑, 1577–1643), Zhang Xiaosi (張孝思), Da Zhongguang (笪重光, 1623–1692), and Liang Qingbiao (梁清標, 1620–1691), before finally being acquired by a wealthy salt merchant, An Qi (安岐, 1683–c. 1746).

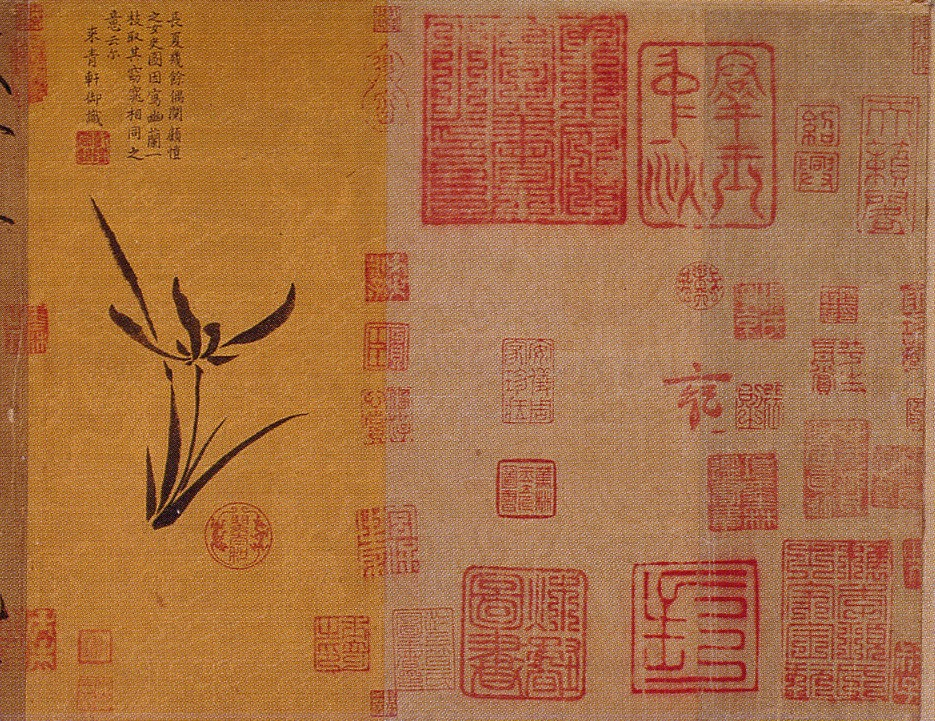
Section of the scroll showing a drawing of an orchid and accompanying inscription by the Qianlong Emperor.

After the death of An Qi, the Admonitions Scroll passed into the hands of the Qianlong Emperor (r. 1735–1796), who treasured the painting as the pinnacle of Chinese art. Qianlong had the painting remounted in 1746, and a number of extra elements were added to the scroll, including a title inscription, a painting of an orchid by Qianlong, a long colophon by Qianlong, and at the very end of the scroll a painting by Zou Yigui (鄒一桂, 1686–1772). He housed the scroll, together with three other masterpieces attributed to the Northern Song painter Li Gonglin (1049–1106), which he collectively named the "Four Beauties" (Chinese: 四美; pinyin: sìměi), in his private residence, the Pavilion of Tranquil Ease (Chinese: 靜怡軒; pinyin: Jìngyí Xuān). Qianlong also commissioned two paintings each from eight painters to be affixed to the outer boxes containing the "Four Beauties", but none of the boxes survive. Like Xiang Yuanbian before him, Qianlong marked his ownership of the painting with numerous seal impressions (37 in total), which he apparently added at different times and on different occasions throughout his sixty-year reign.

After the death of Qianlong the Admonitions Scroll remained in the imperial palace at Beijing, but when the building in which the "Four Beauties" were housed was in need of repairs the Empress Dowager Cixi (de facto ruler of China from 1861 to 1908) ordered the four paintings to be transferred to the Summer Palace to the west of the city. In 1899 the Boxer Rebellion broke out, and the following summer an international force was sent to quell the rebellion and relieve the siege of Western legations in Beijing. After the suppression of the Boxers, there was a considerable amount of looting throughout the capital, and during this time of chaos Captain Clarence A. K. Johnson (1870–1937) of the 1st Bengal Lancers, who was stationed at the Summer Palace, somehow managed to acquire the Admonitions Scroll. His family later claimed that he was given the scroll as a reward for escorting a "lady of high birth" and her family to safety, but this story has never been corroborated. Johnson did not realise the value of the scroll, but when he returned to London in 1902 he took it to the British Museum to have the jade toggle on it valued. The keeper of the department of Prints and Drawings, Sidney Colvin (1845–1927), and his assistant, Laurence Binyon (1869–1943), recognised the significance of the painting, and in 1903 the British Museum purchased it from Johnson for the sum of £25. By 1910 the scroll had been examined by a number of experts in Oriental art, and it had been recognised as an ancient masterpiece of Chinese art, and in 1912 the British Museum commissioned the printing of one hundred woodblock colour print facsimiles of the painting by Sugizaki Hideaki (杉崎秀明) and Urushibara Mokuchu (漆原木虫). In 1914–1915 the scroll was dismantled, and remounted on two long stretchers, one containing the nine scenes of the original painting, and one containing all the other sections, except for the Zou Yigui painting, which was mounted separately as an album leaf. Since 1914 the painting has been housed in the North Wing of the British Museum, although it is only occasionally put on public display due to its sensitivity to light; namely, six weeks each year.

== Reference notes ==
Preceded by 38: Ceremonial ballgame belt	A History of the World in 100 Objects; Object 39	Succeeded by 40: Empress pepper pot
