= Gongzi You =

Ancient Chinese king

Gongzi You (公子友), (died 796 BC), also known as Cao You (曹友), also known as Yan You (颜友), Cao surname, Yan clan, name: You (友), other name: Fei (肥), was the founding monarch of Xiao Zhu, a vassal state of Western Zhou. His father was Duke Wu of Zhu, the 7th generation monarch of Zhu.

== History ==
The descendants of Yan An were given the small regional state of Zhu during Zhou Dynasty.

Cao Yifu earned merits and was appointed ruler to the Ni (state), also known as Xiao Zhu. Zhu was then divided into three kingdoms.
