= Yan (surname 顏) =

Chinese family name

颜 / 顏
- Romanization: Mandarin: Yan; Hokkien: Gan; Cantonese: Ngan; Vietnamese: Nhan; Korean: An
- Pronunciation: Yán, Ngan4, Gân, nyahn /ɲan/
- Gender: Masculine
- Language: Chinese, Vietnamese, Korean, Japanese

Origin
- Meaning: “face”, colour

顏 (Mandarin: Yan) is a Chinese surname. It is known as Gan in Hokkien, Ngan in Cantonese, Nhan in Vietnamese and An in Korean.

顏 is the 112th most common surname in the People's Republic of China in 2016. A total of around 1.7 million people bear the name, mostly in the regions of Hunan, Guangxi and Hubei.

Yan was listed 143rd on the Hundred Family Surnames, in the verse Jiang Tong Yan Guo (江童顏郭).

== Origins ==
Tomb of Yan You was unearthed in Shandong, China, since 2002.

Yan You was the first king of Xiao Zhu and was originally known as Cao You. His ancestor was called Yan An who inherited a piece of land, which later flourished into the Zhu kingdom, a feudal state of Lu. According to the judicial rules of that time, Cao You had to give up his surname in order to ascend the throne. He adopted his father Yi Fu's style name Bo Yan. From then on Cao You was known as Yan You. This officially made Yan You the first Yan in Chinese history. Yan An was the son of Luzhong (陸終), grandson of Zhurong clan and Wuhui (吳回). Zhurong was said to be the son of Gaoyang (also known as Zhuanxu), a sky god. Zhuanxu was a grandson of the Yellow Emperor.

It is derived from at least two sources:

1. from the personal name 顏, the style name of Duke Wu of Zhu, the king of the state of Zhu, during the Western Zhou dynasty
2. from the name of a fief in modern Shandong province granted to Bo Qin, son of Duke of Zhou the first king of Lu during the Western Zhou dynasty

== See also ==
- List of people with surname Yan (顏)
- Temple of Yan (颜庙), is a temple in Qufu, China, dedicated to Yan Hui (521-490 BC), the favorite disciple of Confucius
- Four Sages
- Ganlu Zishu (干祿字書), 'Character Book for Seeking an Official Emolument' is a Chinese orthography dictionary of the Tang Dynasty
