= Kesi (tapestry) =

Technique in Chinese silk tapestry weaving

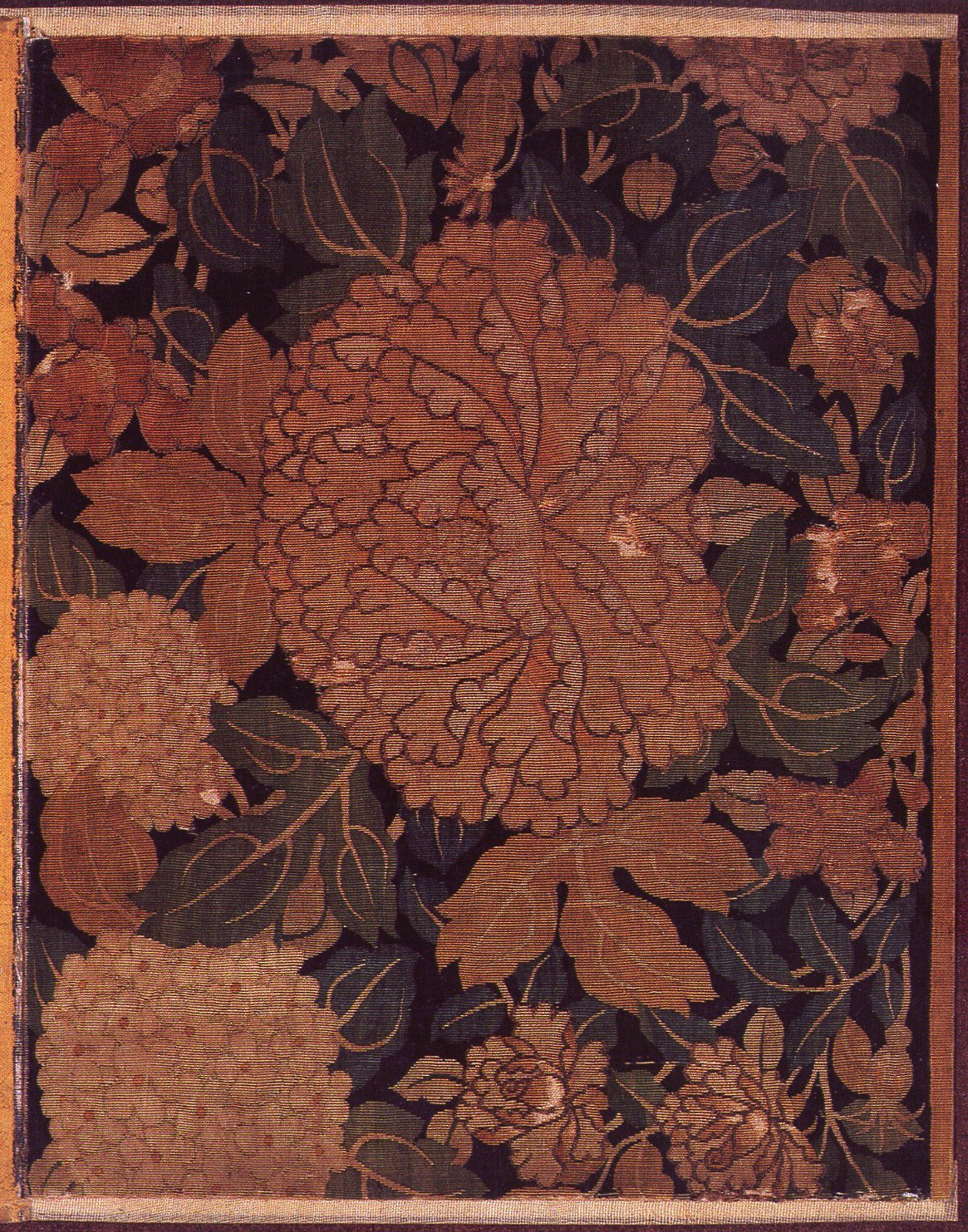
Song dynasty silk tapestry wrapper from the Admonitions Scroll of Gu Kaizhi, with a design of a peony among hydrangeas

Kesi (simplified Chinese: 缂丝; traditional Chinese: 緙絲; pinyin: kèsī) is a technique in Chinese silk tapestry. It is admired for its lightness and clarity of pattern. At first, this technique was chiefly used to protect scrolls containing paintings. It was also employed as a support for paintings, later becoming an esteemed art form. This art form especially flourished between the eleventh and thirteenth centuries.

The Sogdians from Central Asia during the mid-1st millennium brought their art and technique of textile tapestry to China (the Sogdians established flourishing communities throughout, and by the 6th century, their textile patterns were already being seen in China), and it is through this Silk Road influence, resulted in what became known as "kesi". During the Song dynasty, the art of the "kesi" reached its height.

It is a tapestry weave, typically using silk on a small scale compared to European wall hangings. Clothing for the court was one of the primary uses. The density of knots is usually very high, with a gown of the best quality perhaps involving as much work as a much larger European tapestry. Initially used for small pieces, often with animal, bird and flower decoration, or dragons for imperial clothing, under the Ming dynasty it was used to copy paintings.

"Kesi" means "cut silk", as the technique uses short lengths of weft thread tucked into the textile. Only the weft threads are visible in the finished fabric. Unlike continuous weft brocade, in kesi, each colour area was woven from a separate bobbin, making the style both technically demanding and time-consuming.

Kesi first appeared during the Tang dynasty (618–907) and became popular in the Southern Song (1127–1279), reaching its height during the Ming dynasty (1368–1644). The style continued to be popular until the early 20th century and the end of the Qing dynasty in 1911–12.
