= Yan Hong-sen =

Taiwanese politician (born 1951)

- 顏鴻森

Minister without Portfolio
- In office 5 February 2015 – 1 February 2016
- Succeeded by: Chung Char-dir

Personal details
- Born: 12 February 1951 (age 75) Changhua, Taiwan
- Education: National Cheng Kung University (BS); University of Kentucky (MS); Purdue University (PhD); Tunghai University

Yan Hong-sen (Chinese: 顏鴻森; pinyin: Yán Hóngsēn; born 12 February 1951) is a Taiwanese engineering professor and politician. He was a Minister without Portfolio in the Executive Yuan from 2015 to 2016.

== Education ==
Yan graduated from National Cheng Kung University (NCKU) with a bachelor's degree in mechanical engineering in 1973. He then earned a Master of Science (M.S.) in mechanical engineering from the University of Kentucky in 1977 and his Ph.D. in mechanical engineering from Purdue University in 1980.

In order to understand the contents of ancient literature and the development of ancient machinery, he later enrolled in the Chinese Department of Tunghai University at the age of seventy.

== Academic career ==
Upon the end of his studies in the United States, Yan returned to the Department of Mechanical Engineering of NCKU as associate professor from 1980 to 1984, department head from 1986 to 1987 and Vice President from 2011 to 2015. Yan received ASME's Engineer-Historian Award in 2021.

== Political career ==
Yan was appointed as a Minister without Portfolio on 5 February 2015.
