= Yan Ganhui =

Chinese politician

- 颜赣辉

Communist Party Secretary of Yichun
- In office June 2017 – June 2020
- Mayor: Zhang Xiaoping; Wang Shuiping; Xu Nanji
- Preceded by: Deng Baosheng
- Succeeded by: Yu Xiuming

Mayor of Shangrao
- In office April 2016 – June 2017
- Party Secretary: Ma Chengzu
- Preceded by: Ma Chengzu
- Succeeded by: Xie Laifa

Mayor of Jingdezhen
- In office September 2013 – April 2016
- Party Secretary: Liu Changlin; Zhong Zhisheng
- Preceded by: Liu Changlin
- Succeeded by: Mei Yi

Personal details
- Born: February 1962 (age 64) Chongren County, Jiangxi, China
- Party: Chinese Communist Party (1985–2021; expelled)
- Education: Jiangxi University of Finance and Economics

Chinese name
- Simplified Chinese: 颜赣辉
- Traditional Chinese: 顏贛輝
Transcriptions
Standard Mandarin
- Hanyu Pinyin: Yan Ganhui

Yan Ganhui (Chinese: 颜赣辉; born February 1962) is a former Chinese politician who spent his entire career in his home-province Jiangxi. As of June 2020, he was under investigation by the Central Commission for Discipline Inspection. Previously he served as Chinese Communist Party Committee Secretary of Yichun.

== Biography ==
Yan was born in Chongren County, Jiangxi, in February 1962. After resuming the college entrance examination, in 1978, he was admitted to Jiangxi University of Finance and Economics, majoring in statistics.

After graduating in 1982, he was despatched to the Bureau of Statistics of Fuzhou, where he was eventually promoted to director in May 1993. He joined the Chinese Communist Party (CCP) in May 1985. He became magistrate of Jinxi County, a county under the jurisdiction of Fuzhou, in December 1995, and then party secretary, the top political position in the county, beginning in November 1997. He was appointed head of the Organization Department of CCP Shangrao Municipal Committee in September 2000 and one month later was admitted to member of the standing committee of the CCP Shangrao Municipal Committee, the city's top authority. In January 2005, he was appointed vice mayor of Yichun. After this office was terminated in August 2011, he became deputy party secretary of Pingxiang, serving until September 2013, when he was made mayor and deputy party secretary of Jingdezhen. In April 2016, he took office as mayor of Shangrao, he remained in that position until June 2017, when he was transferred to Yichun again and appointed party secretary.

=== Downfall ===
On 8 June 2020, he was put under investigation for alleged "serious violations of discipline and laws" by the Central Commission for Discipline Inspection (CCDI), the party's internal disciplinary body, and the National Supervisory Commission, the highest anti-corruption agency of China.

In February 2021, he was expelled from the CCP and dismissed from public office. On March 26, he stood trial at the Intermediate People's Court of Xinyu on charges of taking bribes. He was charged with accepting money and property worth over 26.119 million yuan ($4.06 million) personally or through others. According to the indictment, he allegedly took advantage of his positions to seek benefits for others in business restructuring, project contracting and personnel promotions between 2007 and 2020. He was sentenced to 11 years in prison and fine of 2 million yuan on taking bribes.

Government offices
Preceded by Liu Changlin	Mayor of Jingdezhen; 2013–2016	Succeeded by Mei Yi
Preceded by Ma Chengzu	Mayor of Shangrao; 2016–2017	Succeeded by Xie Laifa
Party political offices
Preceded by Deng Baosheng	Communist Party Secretary of Yichun; 2017–2020	Succeeded by Yu Xiuming
