= Zou Yigui =

Chinese painter (1686–1772)

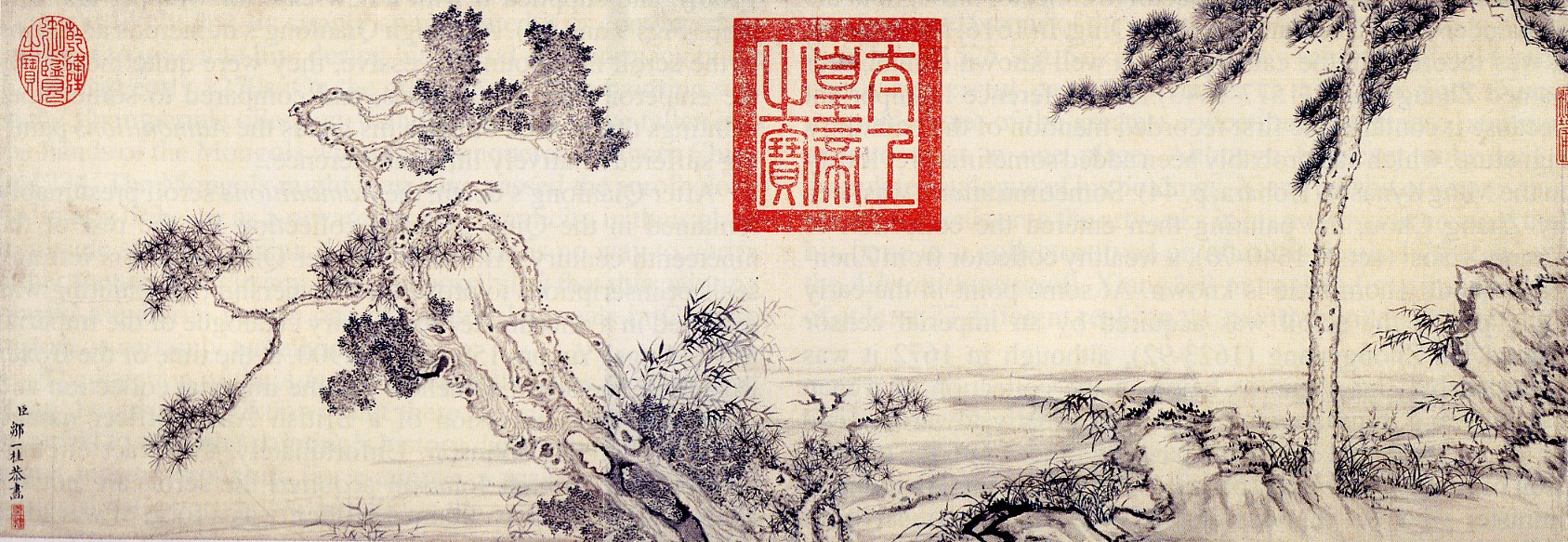
Zou Yigui's colophon painting to the Song dynasty Palace Museum version of the Admonitions Scroll, 1746.

Zou Yigui (simplified Chinese: 邹一桂; traditional Chinese: 鄒一桂; pinyin: Zōu Yīguì; Wade–Giles: Tsou I-kui) (1686–1772), style name as Yuanbao (原褒), sobriquet as Xiaoshan (小山) and Erzhi (二知), is a famed Chinese painter in Qing dynasty. He was born in Wuxi, Jiangsu Province.

He painted for the imperial family, skilled in painting flowers and landscapes. He once wrote a book named "Art of Painting of Xiaoshan" (小山畫譜), discussing the experience of painting.
