= Yan Long'an =

Chinese agronomist

- 颜龙安
- Born: September 16, 1937 (age 88); Pingxiang, Jiangxi, China
- Education: Jiangxi Agricultural University
- Scientific career
- Fields: Hybrid rice
- Workplaces: Jiangxi Academy of Agricultural Sciences

Chinese name
- Simplified Chinese: 颜龙安
- Traditional Chinese: 顏龍安
Transcriptions
Standard Mandarin
- Hanyu Pinyin: Yán Lóng'ān

Yan Long'an (born September 16, 1937) is a Chinese agronomist best known for developing the hybrid rice "Shan-You 2". He has been hailed as "Mother of Hybrid Rice". He is an academician of the Chinese Academy of Engineering. He is a member of the Chinese Communist Party. He was a delegate to the 5th, 6th, 7th, 8th and 9th National People's Congress.

== Biography ==
Yan was born in Dongqiao Township of Pingxiang, Jiangxi, on September 16, 1937. In 1958, he was accepted to Jiangxi Agricultural College (now Jiangxi Agricultural University), where he majored in the Department of Agriculture. After graduating in 1962, he was dispatched to Pingxiang Agriculture Bureau as a technician. In 1970, he was transferred to Pingxiang Agricultural Science Institute, where he was promoted to director in 1983. He joined the Chinese Communist Party in October 1970. In 1995, he was appointed party chief and president of Jiangxi Academy of Agricultural Sciences, and served until 1998.

== Honours and awards ==
- 2007 Member of the Chinese Academy of Engineering (CAE)
