= Xiaoqin Zou =

Chinese and American molecular biophysicist

Xiaoqin Zou (Chinese: 邹晓勤, born 1967) is a Chinese and American molecular biophysicist whose research concerns the computational modeling of protein–protein interactions and protein–ligand complexes, and the applications of these models in drug discovery and understanding protein function. She is Curators' Distinguished Professor at the University of Missouri, affiliated with the university's Department of Physics and Astronomy, Department of Biochemistry, Institute for Data Science and Informatics, and Dalton Cardiovascular Research Center.

== Education and career ==
Zou was born in 1967 in Changsha. She received a bachelor's degree in physics from Wuhan University in 1987, and continued her studies in physics and biophysics at the University of California, San Diego. There, she received a master's degree in 1989 and completed her Ph.D. in 1993. Her doctoral dissertation, Spatiotemporal Patterns in Excitable and Self-Oscillatory Media, was supervised by Herbert Levine.

She was a postdoctoral researcher with Irwin "Tack" Kuntz at the University of California, San Francisco. After moving circa 2000 to the University of Missouri's Dalton Cardiovascular Research Center as a research assistant professor of biochemistry, she added an affiliation as an assistant professor in the Department of Physics and Astronomy in 2007. She was given a Curators' Distinguished Professorship in 2024.

== Recognition ==
Zou was elected as a Fellow of the American Physical Society (APS) in 2019, after a nomination from the APS Division of Biological Physics, "for outstanding contributions to developing novel physics-based algorithms for modeling protein interactions with applications to structure-based drug design". She was named as a Fellow of the American Association for the Advancement of Science, in the 2022 class of fellows, "for distinguished contributions to the field of computational and theoretical biophysics, particularly for developing novel physics-based algorithms for modeling protein interactions with applications to structure-based drug design".
