= Zou Taixin =

Chinese politician

- 邹太新

Communist Party Secretary of Honghu
- In office September 2011 – February 2015
- Succeeded by: Deng Yingjun (邓应军)

Personal details
- Born: November 1966 (age 59) Tianmen, Hubei, China
- Party: Chinese Communist Party (expelled; 1993–2015)

Zou Taixin (simplified Chinese: 邹太新; traditional Chinese: 鄒太新; pinyin: Zōu Taìxīn; born November 1966) is a Chinese former politician who spent most of his career in South Central China's Hubei province. He was investigated by the Chinese Communist Party's Central Commission for Discipline Inspection in February 2015. Previously he served as the Communist Party Secretary of Honghu.

== Biography ==
Zou was born and raised in Tianmen, Hubei.

He began his political career in June 1988, and joined the Chinese Communist Party in May 1993.

He spent 16 years working in Jingzhou before serving as the Deputy Communist Party Secretary of Shashi District.

In September 2011, he was promoted to Communist Party Secretary of Honghu, he remained in that position until February 2015, when he was placed under investigation by the Communist Party's anti-corruption agency. On August 3, he was expelled from the Chinese Communist Party (CCP) and dismissed from public office.

In June 2016, he was indicted on suspicion of accepting bribes. On August 11, he pleaded guilty to bribery during his first trial at Jingmen Intermediate People's Court in Hubei province. Prosecutors accused him of taking advantage of his different positions in Hubei between 2002 and 2014 to seek profits for various companies and individuals in individuals and enterprises selection, land acquisition and demolition, real estate development, and financial funds allocation. In return, he accepted money and valuables worth more than 1.6 million yuan.

Party political offices
Preceded by ?	Communist Party Secretary of Honghu; 2011–2015	Succeeded by Deng Yingjun
