= Zou (state) =

Ancient Chinese state

Zou/Zhu 鄒/邾
- 1046–4th century BCE
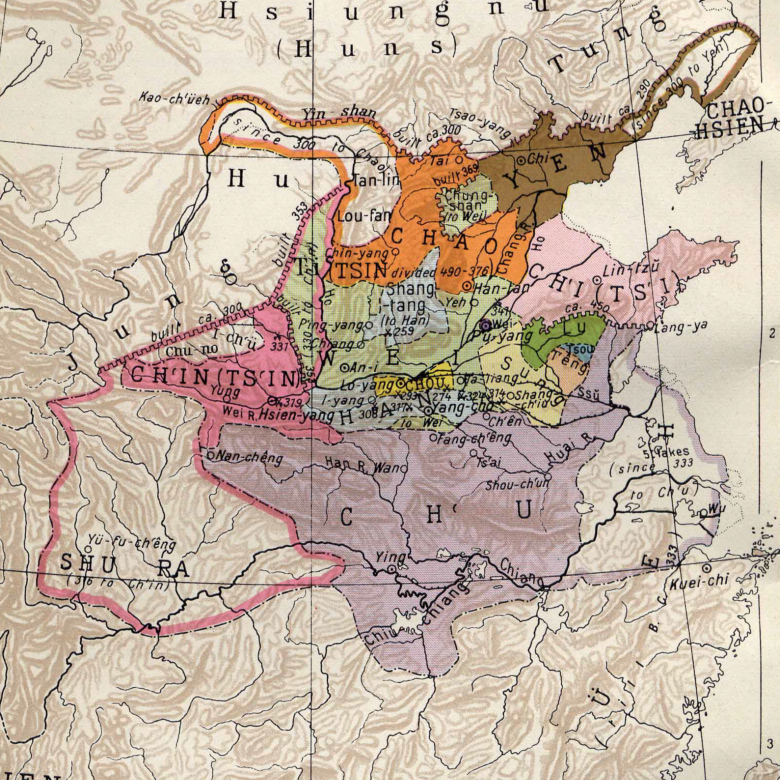
- Zou can be seen as Tsou
- Status: Regional State (1046–4th century BCE)
- Capital: Zhu (now south of Qufu); Zou (now southeast of Zoucheng)
- Religion: ancestor worship
- Government: Monarchy
- History
  - Enfeoffment: 1046
  - Conquered by Chu: 4th century BCE
Succeeded by
Chu state

Zou (simplified Chinese: 邹; traditional Chinese: 鄒), originally Zhu (邾) or Zhulou (邾婁), was a minor state that existed during the Zhou dynasty of ancient China. It centered near today's Zoucheng, Shandong province.

== History ==
=== Origin ===
King Wu of Zhou granted Cao Xia (曹挾) control of the small state of Zhu as a vassal ruler under the State of Lu with the feudal title Viscount (子), but later holding the title Duke of Zhu (邾公). The ancestral surname of the ruling family was Cao (曹). The ruling family were descendants of Zhuanxu.

=== Development ===
During the Spring and Autumn period, the State of Zhu gradually grew stronger and was known as "Zhoulou".

In 659 BC, Duke Xi of Lu, along with the rulers of the states of Qi, Song, Zheng, Cao, and Zhu, met in the area of Cheng (檉). The following month, Duke Xi of Lu's army defeated the army of Zhu in the area of Yan (偃).

During the reign of Duke Mu of Lu (417 BC – 377 BC), Zhu's name was changed to Zou. The state of Zou was located in the southwest of modern-day Shandong Province. Its territory is now the county-level city of Zoucheng.

=== Demise ===
Zou was conquered and annexed by the state of Chu during the reign of King Xuan of Chu (r. 369–340 BC). The people of Zou and their descendants adopted Zhu (朱) or Zou as their surnames.

== Legacy ==
Zhu (朱), without the radical, is one of the most common surnames of modern-day China. Another, albeit less common surname Zou (鄒/邹) is also derived from the former name of the state.

The noted Neo-Confucian Zhu Xi descends from the ruling house. The small state of Zou, however, is most famous as the birthplace of the Chinese philosopher Mencius. As the overlord State of Lu was the home state of Confucius and many of his disciples, this means that Confucianism's founder, and most of its minor sages and wise men hailed from or had ancestral roots in these two ancient states of China.

== See also ==
- Xiao Zhu
