= Ni (state) =

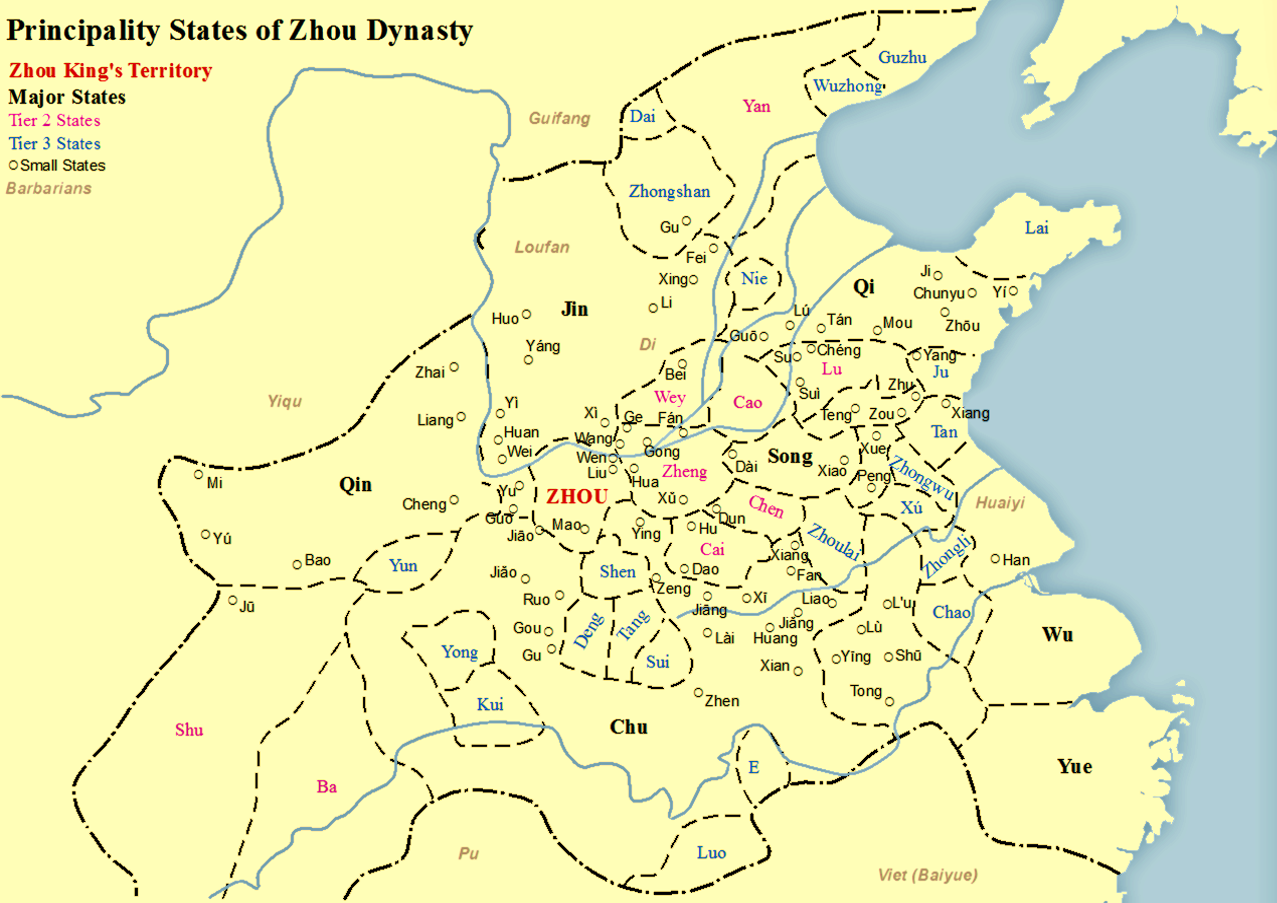
Map of states in Zhou dynasty including Zou

The State of Ni (郳國), also known as the state of Xiao Zhu (小邾國) or the state of Xiao Zhulou (小邾婁國), was segregated from Zhu (Zhulou), a vassal state of Lu, during Zhou dynasty. It was destroyed by Chu during the Warring States period.

== Location ==
Xiao Zhu was a vassal state between the late Western Zhou and Warring States period, which was located between Qi, Lu, Song, Chu and other major countries. The "Spring and Autumn Annals: Xiao Zhu" was lost due to war, it also marked the location of Ni state or Xiao Zhu. The territory of Xiao Zhu was roughly the entire Shanting district.

== History ==
After the fall of Shang dynasty, King Wu of Zhou had appointed his younger brothers to secure the newly conquered Shang lands. Duke of Zhou successfully suppressed the Rebellion of the Three Guards. Cao Xia (descendant of Yan An) was given the small regional state of Zou.

=== Three Kingdoms of Zhu ===
Three Zhu States

Gongzi You was enthroned at Ni state or Xiao Zhu when Yifu Yan was still alive. Yifu Yan, also known as Viscount Yan of Zou, was the seventh monarch of Zou. The state had grown from a small one to a strong one, closely following Qi and Lu. At that time, Qi promoted hegemony; Yifu Yan responded positively and ran to and fro Teng, Xue and other countries, causing dissatisfaction in Lu. Yifu Yan was reported to King You of Zhou, the last king of Western Zhou. Yifu Yan was framed and later executed.

Some said that Cao Yan was executed because he helped the Boyu to usurp the throne during the reign of Duke Yi of Lu. Later Yifu Yan's younger brother, Shushu, was ordered to represent Zou. Shushu was on the throne for more than 10 years, Yifu Yan injustice was then rehabilitated and he was given the title Viscount Wu of Zou. Viscount Wu of Zou had two sons, Viscount Xia of Zou and Gongzi You. After the unjust case was clear, Shushu returned the king position to the eldest son and went to establish the state of Lan.

=== Li Lai of Ni ===
In 653, Li Lai was ordered by the king to be promoted to Viscount. Since it had the same title as Zou, Ni state was renamed to Xiao Zhu, to show that the states were different from each other because they were from the same clan.

=== Viscount Mu of Xiao Zhu ===
In 525, Viscount Mu hosted a banquet for Duke Zhao of Lu. During the banquet, Ji Pingzi wrote the poem, "Caishu", while Duke Mu wrote "Jing Jing Zhe E" to harmonize. During this period, Xiao Zhu culture spread far and wide to the world. Duke Mu reigned for 41 years, the longest reigning monarch in Xiao Zhu.

=== Defeat ===
During the reign of King Xuan of Chu (369–340 BC), Zou and Xiao Zhu were destroyed.

== Descendant ==
Yan Hui was the 18th generation descendant of Yan You.

== Rulers of the state ==
- Gongzi You (公子友), son of Viscount Wu of Zou (邾武公) also known as Viscount Yan of Zou (邾颜公)
- Li Lai of Ni (郳犁來)
- Viscount Mu of Xiao Zhu (小邾穆公)
- Viscount Gong of Xiao Zhu (小邾恭公)
- Viscount Hui of Xiao Zhu (小邾惠公)
- Viscount Ai of Xiao Zhu (小邾哀公)

== Excavation findings ==
During the summer of 2002, villagers from Dongjiang Village, ten kilometers from southwest of Shangcheng Street, Shanting district, Zaozhuang city, discovered ancient tombs on the south side of the high earth platform in the south of the village.

Five ancient tombs, two of which had been robbed, and the three well-preserved ancient tombs were immediately investigated. 233 cultural relics were unearthed, including 203 bronzes, 24 bronzes with inscriptions, 17 pottery, 12 jade and 1 bone. From the unearthed bronze inscriptions, it is inferred that tomb No.1 was Yan You, the king of Xiao Zhu and some bronze wares with inscriptions were also unearthed in the second and third tombs.

== See also ==
- Zuo Zhuan
- Gongyang Zhuan
