= Nine sons of the dragon =

Name for certain traditional Chinese decorative structures

The nine sons of the dragon is a traditional name for a set of mythological creatures whose imagery is used in certain types of decorations. The concept was first mentioned by Lu Rong in the Ming Dynasty, although similar set of creatures (not necessarily nine) is recorded even earlier.

== List of nine sons ==
The oldest known attestation of the children of the dragon list is found in the Miscellaneous records from the bean garden (菽園雜記) by Lu Rong (1436–1494); however, he noted that the list enumerates mere synonyms of various antiques, not children of a dragon.

Several Ming Dynasty texts list what were claimed as the Nine Offspring of the Dragon (Chinese: 龍生九子), and subsequently these feature prominently in popular Chinese stories and writings. There are four principal versions of the list:

- Lu Rong's (陸容, 1436–1494) list, which includes 14 creatures
- Li Dongyang's (李東陽, 1447–1516) list, which includes 9 creatures
- Yang Shen's (楊慎, 1488–1559) list, which also includes 9 creatures — this version is the most widely found one
- Fang Yizhi's (方以智, 1611－1671) list, which combines elements of the previous lists

Below are all the creatures mentioned in these lists:

Image	Placing	Shape	Names				Fond of
Image	Placing	Shape	Lu Rong	Li Dongyang	Yang Shen	Fang Yizhi	Fond of
	under steles	turtle	屭贔	霸下	贔屭	𧈢𧏡	heavy weights
	tops of steles	dragon	螭虎	贔屭			literary talent
	under bridges	lizard	饕餮		𧈢𧏡 (Note: This term contains rare characters 𧈢 (⿰虫八) and 𧏡 (⿰虫夏), and may be mistakenly spelled as 蚣蝮, 趴蝮, or 蚣𧏡. It is thought to be a phonetic respelling of 霸下 (read as bàxià in Mandarin, ba-hah in Cantonese, and pà-hǎ in Hokkien).)	蜥蜴	water
	bronze vessels	beast			饕餮	饕餮	food
	sword handles	demon	蟋蜴	睚眦	睚眦	睚眦	murder
	roof corners	dragon	螭𧉚		螭吻 (Note: In modern popular usage, this term may be applied to all decorations found on roofs, including fish-shaped and dragon-shaped.)	鴟吻	gazing
	roof ridges	fish	鰲魚	蚩吻			swallowing fire
	roof ridges	dragon	𧖣𧊲 (Note: This word contains rare characters 𧖣 (⿰虫蠻) and 𧊲 (⿰虫全), and its exact pronunciation is unknown.)				wind and rain
	door knockers	lion	獸𧉚				absorbing evil
	door knockers	spiral shell	椒圖 (Note: In modern popular usage, this term is often used for the lion-shaped door knockers instead of spiral shell-shaped knockers.)		椒圖	椒圖	shutting its mouth
	tower tops	small dragon	虭蛥			虭蛥	peril
	roof corners	phoenix		嘲風		嘲風	peril
	incense burners	lion	金猊		金猊	狻猊	smoke
	Buddha thrones	lion		狻猊			sitting
	bell tops	small dragon	徙牢	蒲牢	蒲牢	蒲牢	roaring
	prison gates	tiger	憲章	狴犴	狴犴	狴犴	confronting
	patrolling routes	mermaid	金吾		金吾		being aware
	lutes	yellow dragon		囚牛		囚牛	music

As seen in the table, some names are assigned to different creatures by different authors. Aside from these names, there are other variants in use, such as 負屭 for the dragons depicted on the tops of steles, or 龜趺 for the turtle found beneath the steles. The word "dragon head" (螭首) may be applied to some of the mentioned structures.

Some of these creatures are based on earlier mythological beasts, such as pulao or bixi, but most of them have no other mythological background and are merely used as names for decorative structures.

There are other creatures that have features of the dragon, but are not listed among the "nine sons of the dragon", including Kirin, Longma, Pixiu, and Denglong

== Modern usage ==
In 2012's year of the Dragon, Shanghai Mint issued two sets of coins featuring nine sons of the dragon, one in silver and one in brass. Each coin in the nine-coin sets depicts one of the nine sons. A 10th additional coin was issued depicting the father dragon in silver and brass, which has iconography of the nine sons on the reverse, for a total of 20 coins in the series.

== See also ==
- Chi (mythology)
- Chinese dragon
- Chinese mythology
- Chinese gods
- Dragon King
- King of the Gods
- List of deities
- Denglong (mythology)
