= Yan Sheng =

Yan Sheng or Yansheng or variation, may refer to:

== Places ==
- Yansheng (演圣镇), a town in Jiange County, Sichuan Province, China

== People ==
- Duke Yansheng (衍聖公; Holy Duke of Yen), a traditional ceremonial title of Chinese nobility held within the Kong Clan for descendants of Kong Fu Zi (Confucius)

=== Given named "Yan-sheng" ===
- Chen Yansheng (陈演生), leader of the Chinese political party China Zhi Gong Party
- Dong Yansheng, award-winning translator into Chinese, winner of the Lu Xun Literary Prize
- Li Yan-sheng (9th century CE), a famed participant in the Tang Dynasty Imperial Examination that exacerbated the Hua–Yi distinction
- Wu Yansheng (吴彦晟; born 1984), Chinese soccer player
- Yang Yansheng (杨雁盛; born 1988), Chinese polevaulter

==== Fictional characters ====
- General Shi Yan-sheng, a fictional character from the 1993 Hong King film Temptation of a Monk

=== Surnamed "Yan" given named "Sheng" ===
==== Fictional characters ====
- Yan Sheng (殷勝), a fictional character from the Hong Kong film Endgame (2021 film)

== Other uses ==
- Yansheng coin (厭勝錢), decorative coins used for traditional Chinese rituals and as amulets

== See also ==
- Yasheng Huang, Chinese professor of management at MIT
- Yang Sheng (disambiguation)
- Sheng (disambiguation)
- Yan (disambiguation)
- Shenyang (disambiguation)
