= Chinese dragon =

Legendary Chinese creature

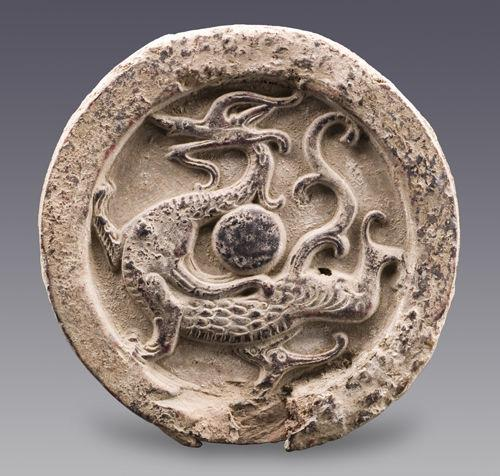
- The Azure Dragon depicted on the eaves tile of the Han dynasty

Creature information
- Grouping: Mythical creature
- Sub grouping: Dragon
- Folklore: Chinese mythology

Origin
- Country: China

Chinese name
- Traditional Chinese: 龍
- Simplified Chinese: 龙
Transcriptions
Standard Mandarin
- Hanyu Pinyin: lóng
- Bopomofo: ㄌㄨㄥˊ
- Wade–Giles: lung^{2}
- IPA: [lʊ̌ŋ]
Wu
- Wugniu: lon^{2}
- IPA: Shanghainese: [loŋ˨˧] Suzhounese: [loŋ˨˨˧] Hangzhounese: [loŋ˨˩˧] Ningbonese: [loŋ˨˦]
Yue: Cantonese
- Yale Romanization: lùhng
- Jyutping: lung4
- IPA: [lʊŋ˩]
Southern Min
- Tâi-lô: lîng (col.) liông (lit.)
Middle Chinese
- Middle Chinese: ljowng
Old Chinese
- Baxter–Sagart (2014): *mə-roŋ
- Zhengzhang: *b·roŋ or *mroːŋ

The Chinese dragon, known as long or loong (/lʊŋ/ LUUNG), is a legendary creature in Chinese mythology, Chinese folklore, and Chinese culture generally. Chinese dragons have many animal-like forms, such as turtles and fish, but are most commonly depicted as snake-like with four legs. Academics have identified four reliable theories on the origin of the Chinese dragon: snakes, Chinese alligators, thunder worship and nature worship. They traditionally symbolize potent and auspicious powers, particularly control over water and weather.

== Symbolism ==
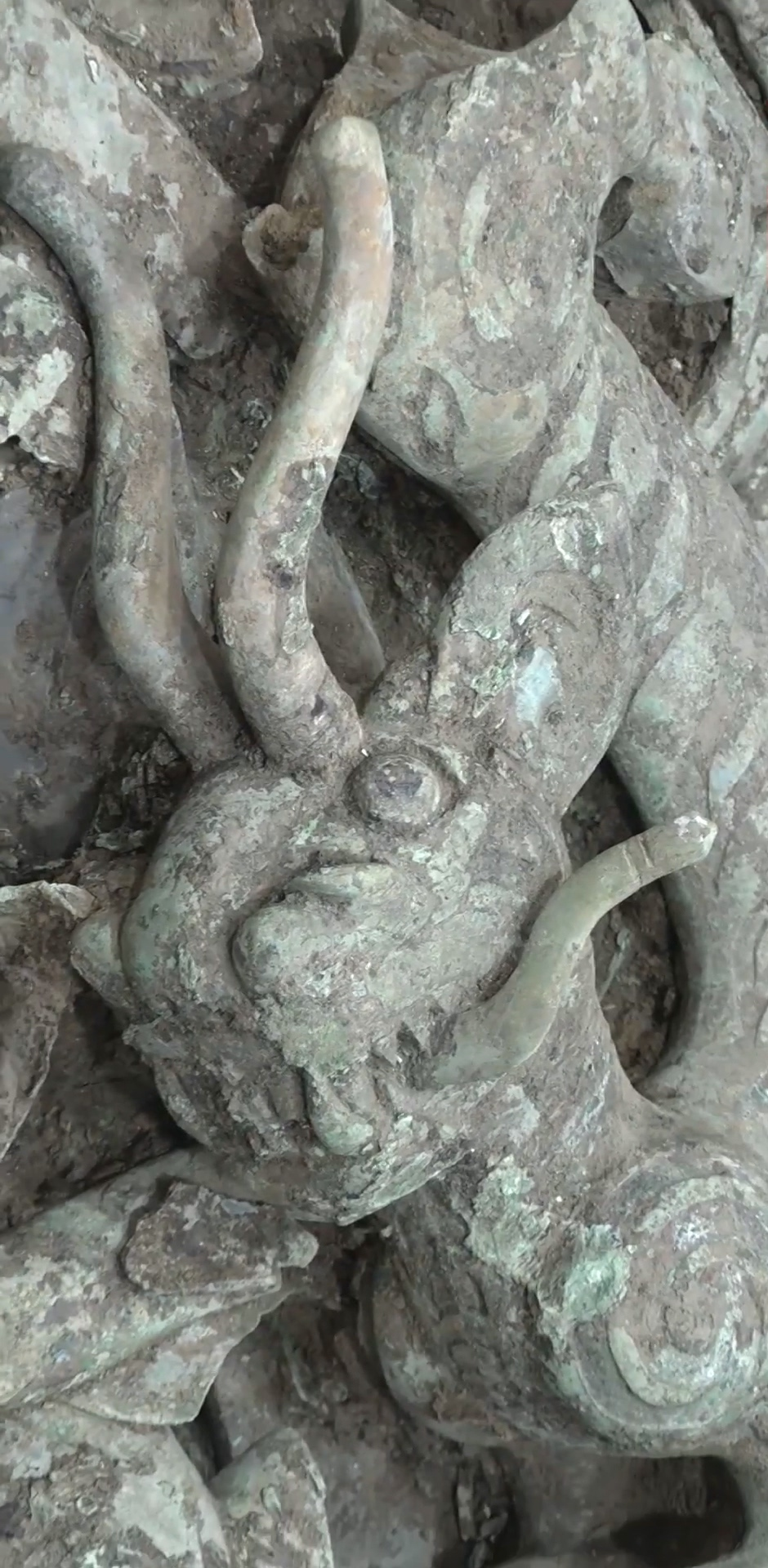
Bronze dragon from Sanxingdui, Shang dynasty

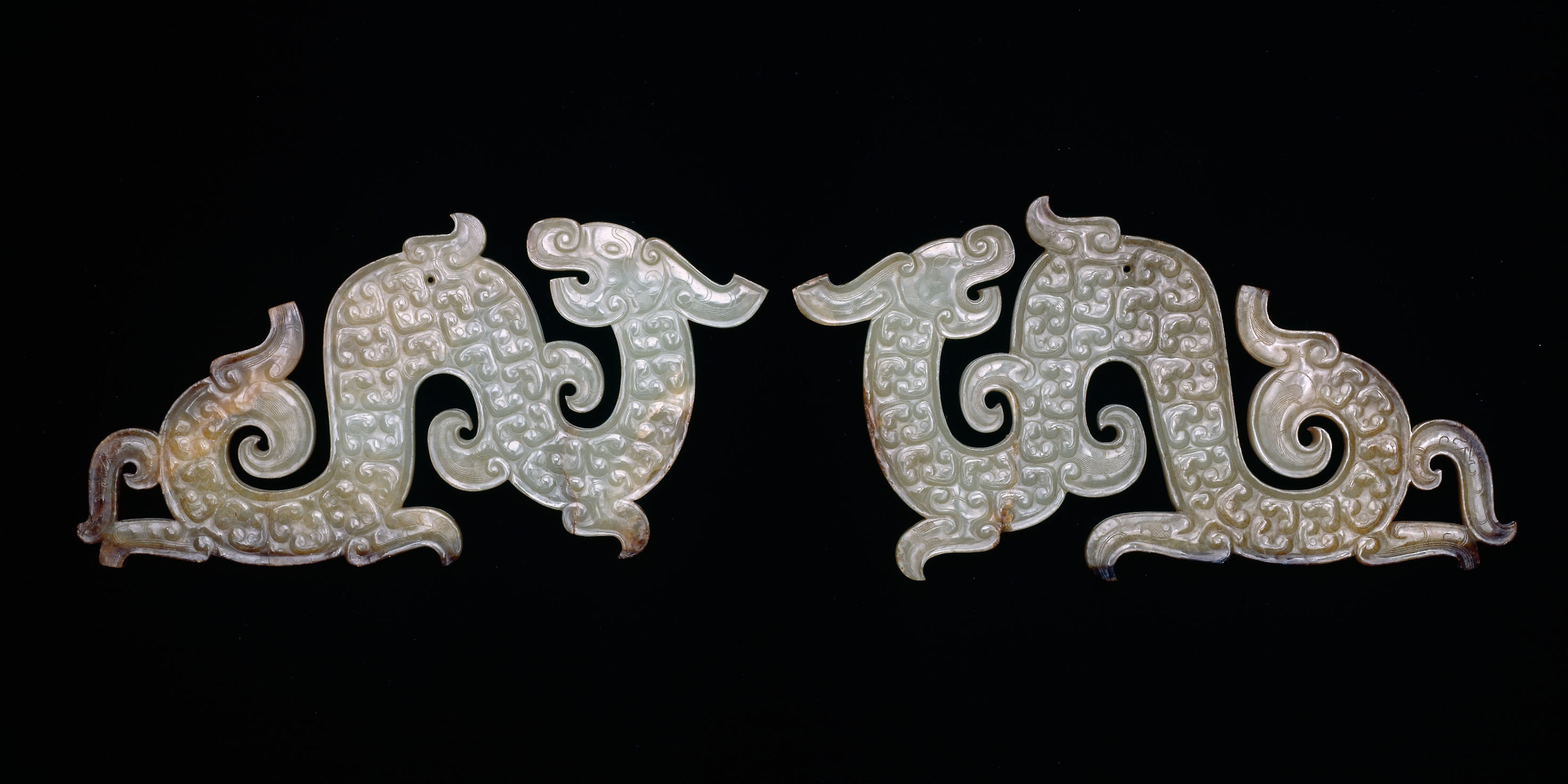
Jade dragon pendants, Zhou dynasty

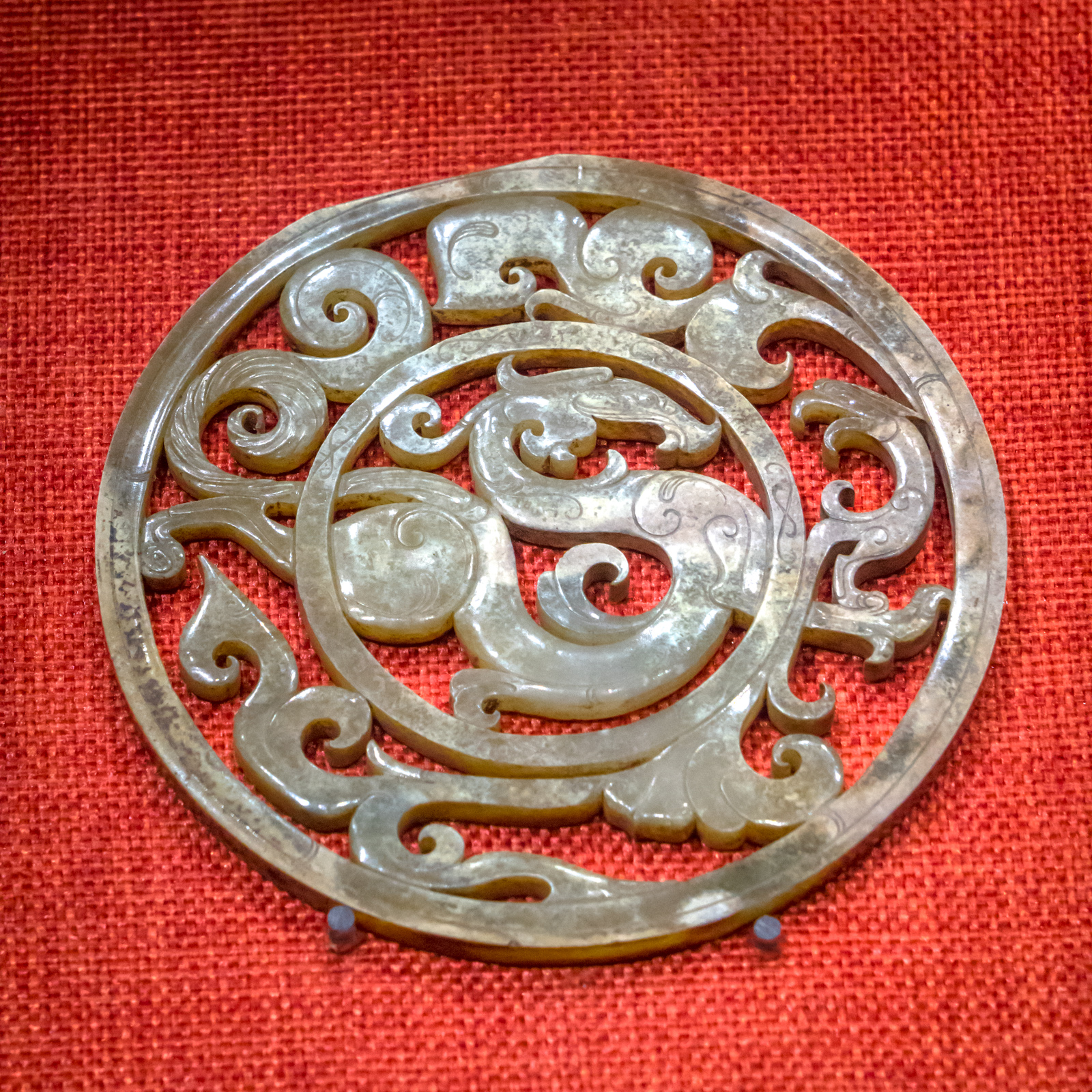
Jade Openwork Disk, Nanyue (203–111 BC)

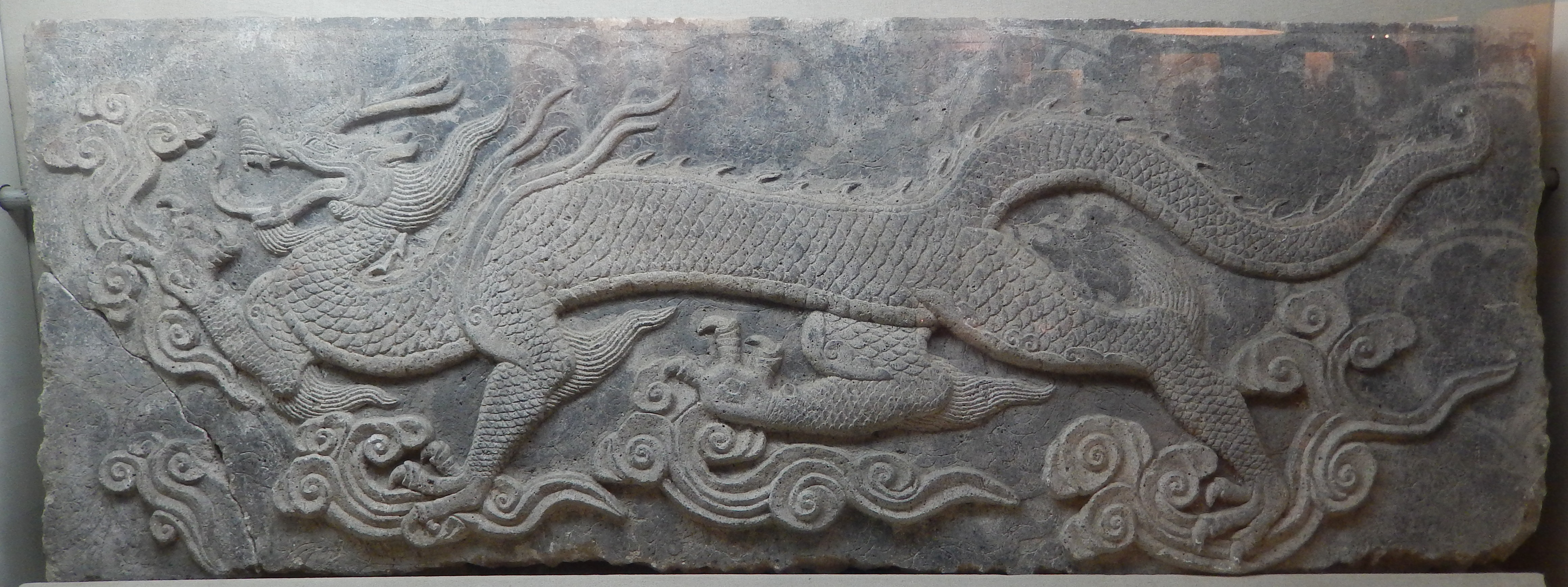
Dragon carving on a tomb, Liao dynasty (916–1125)

Historically, the Chinese dragon was associated with the emperor of China and used as a symbol to represent imperial power. Liu Bang, the founder of the Han dynasty, claimed that he was conceived after his mother dreamt of a dragon. During the Tang dynasty, emperors wore robes with dragon motif as an imperial symbol, and high officials might also be presented with dragon robes. In the Yuan dynasty, the two-horned, five-clawed dragon was designated for use by the Son of Heaven or emperor only, while the four-clawed dragon was used by the princes and nobles. Similarly, during the Ming and Qing dynasty, the five-clawed dragon was strictly reserved for use by the emperor only. The dragon in the Qing dynasty appeared on the flag of the Qing dynasty.

The dragon is sometimes used in the West as a national emblem of Chinese culture, though such use is not commonly seen in either the People's Republic of China or the Republic of China (Taiwan). In Hong Kong, the dragon was a component of the coat of arms under British rule. It was later to become a feature of the design of Brand Hong Kong, a government promotional symbol.

The Chinese dragon has very different connotations from the European dragon – in European cultures, the dragon is a fire-breathing creature with aggressive connotations, whereas the Chinese dragon is a spiritual and cultural symbol that represents prosperity and good luck, as well as a rain deity that fosters harmony. It was reported that the Chinese government decided against using the dragon as its official 2008 Summer Olympics mascot because of the aggressive connotations that dragons have outside of China and chose more "friendly" symbols instead. Sometimes Chinese people use the term "Descendants of the Dragon" (龙的传人; 龍的傳人) as a sign of ethnic identity, as part of a trend started in the 1970s when different Asian nationalities were looking for animal symbols as representations. For example, the wolf may be used by the Mongols as it is considered to be their legendary ancestor.

=== State usage ===
The dragon was the symbol of the Chinese emperor for many dynasties. During the Qing dynasty, the Azure Dragon was featured on the first Chinese national flag. It was featured again on the Twelve Symbols national emblem, which was used during the Republic of China, from 1913 to 1928.

The dragon has been used as a state symbol in Vietnam. During the Nguyễn dynasty, the dragon was featured on the imperial standards. It was also featured on the coats of arms of the State of Vietnam, and later South Vietnam.

Imperial standard of emperors Khải Định and Bảo Đại, 1922–1945

== Worship ==
=== Origin ===
The ancient Chinese self-identified as "the gods of the dragon" because the Chinese dragon is an imagined reptile that represents evolution from the ancestors and qi energy. Dragon-like motifs of a zoomorphic composition in reddish-brown stone have been found at the Chahai site (Liaoning) in the Xinglongwa culture (6200–5400 BC). The presence of dragons within Chinese culture dates back several thousands of years with the discovery of a dragon statue dating back to the fifth millennium BC from the Yangshao culture in Henan in 1987, and jade badges of rank in coiled form have been excavated from the Hongshan culture c. 4700–2900 BC. Some of the earliest Dragon artifacts are the pig dragon carvings from the Hongshan culture.

The coiled dragon or snake form played an important role in early Chinese culture. The character for "dragon" in the earliest Chinese writing has a similar coiled form, as do later jade dragon amulets from the Shang period.

Ancient Chinese referred to unearthed fossil bones as "dragon bones" and documented them as such. For example, Chang Qu in 300 BC documents the discovery of "dragon bones" in Sichuan. "Dragon bones" have been used both historically and in modern times in traditional Chinese medicine. Scientific examination of "dragon bones" from the 19th century to the present suggests they most commonly are remains of fossil Cenozoic mammals, such as the extinct horse Hipparion.

=== In mythology ===
From its origins as totems or the stylized depiction of natural creatures, the Chinese dragon evolved to become a mythical animal. The Han dynasty scholar Wang Fu recorded Chinese myths that long dragons had nine anatomical resemblances.

The people paint the dragon's shape with a horse's head and a snake's tail. Further, there are expressions such as 'three joints' and 'nine resemblances' (of the dragon), to wit: from head to shoulder, from shoulder to breast, and from breast to tail. These are the joints; as to the nine resemblances, they are the following: his antlers resemble those of a stag, his head that of a camel, his eyes those of a demon, his neck that of a snake, his belly that of a clam (shen, 蜃), his scales those of a carp, his claws those of an eagle, his soles those of a tiger, his ears those of a cow. Upon his head, he has a thing like a broad eminence (a big lump), called [chimu] (尺木). If a dragon has no [chimu], he cannot ascend to the sky.

Further sources give variant lists of the nine animal resemblances. Sinologist Henri Doré lists these characteristics of an authentic dragon: "The antlers of a deer. The head of a crocodile. A demon's eyes. The neck of a snake. A tortoise's viscera. A hawk's claws. The palms of a tiger. A cow's ears. And it hears through its horns, its ears being deprived of all power of hearing". He notes that, "Others state it has a rabbit's eyes, a frog's belly, a carp's scales".

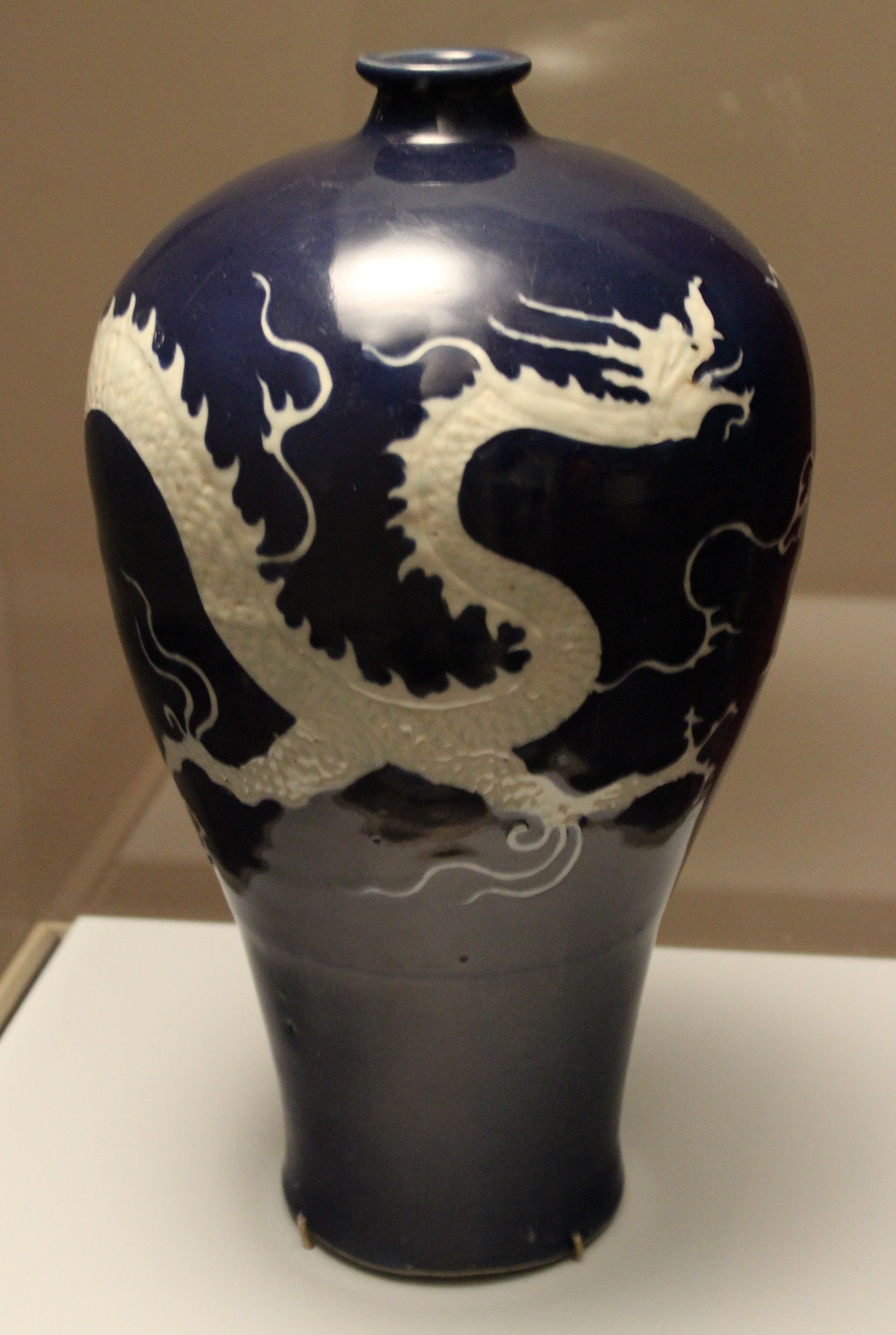
Yellow dragon on a black vase, Yuan dynasty

Chinese dragons were considered to be physically concise. Of the 117 scales, 81 are of the yang essence (positive) while 36 are of the yin essence (negative). Initially, the dragon was benevolent, wise, and just, but the Buddhists introduced the concept of malevolent influence among some dragons. Just as water destroys, they said, so can some dragons destroy via floods, tidal waves, and storms. They suggested that some of the worst floods were believed to have been the result of a mortal upsetting a dragon.

Many pictures of Chinese dragons show a flaming pearl under their chin or in their claws. The pearl is associated with spiritual energy, wisdom, prosperity, power, immortality, thunder, or the moon. Chinese art often depicts a pair of dragons chasing or fighting over a flaming pearl.

Chinese dragons are occasionally depicted with bat-like wings growing out of the front limbs, but most do not have wings, as their ability to fly (and control rain/water, etc.) is mystical and not seen as a result of their physical attributes.

Even without wings the Chinese dragons can supposedly ascend to the sky and fly. According to legend, the dragon's flight is enabled by something on its head named chimu (Wade-Giles: ch'ih-mu, 尺木, lit. 'foot-long wood/tree' (Note: Or "a tree one foot in diameter" according to Mather.)) that resembled the boshan (Wade-Giles: Po-shan, incense burner, i.e. boshanlu or "Hill censer"), without which the dragon cannot fly. This piece of lore attested in the Tang dynasty tract Youyang zazu. (Note: Yu-yang tsa-tsu 17.1a): " 龍頭上有一物如博山形, 名尺木,龍無尺木不能升天" cited by Mather)

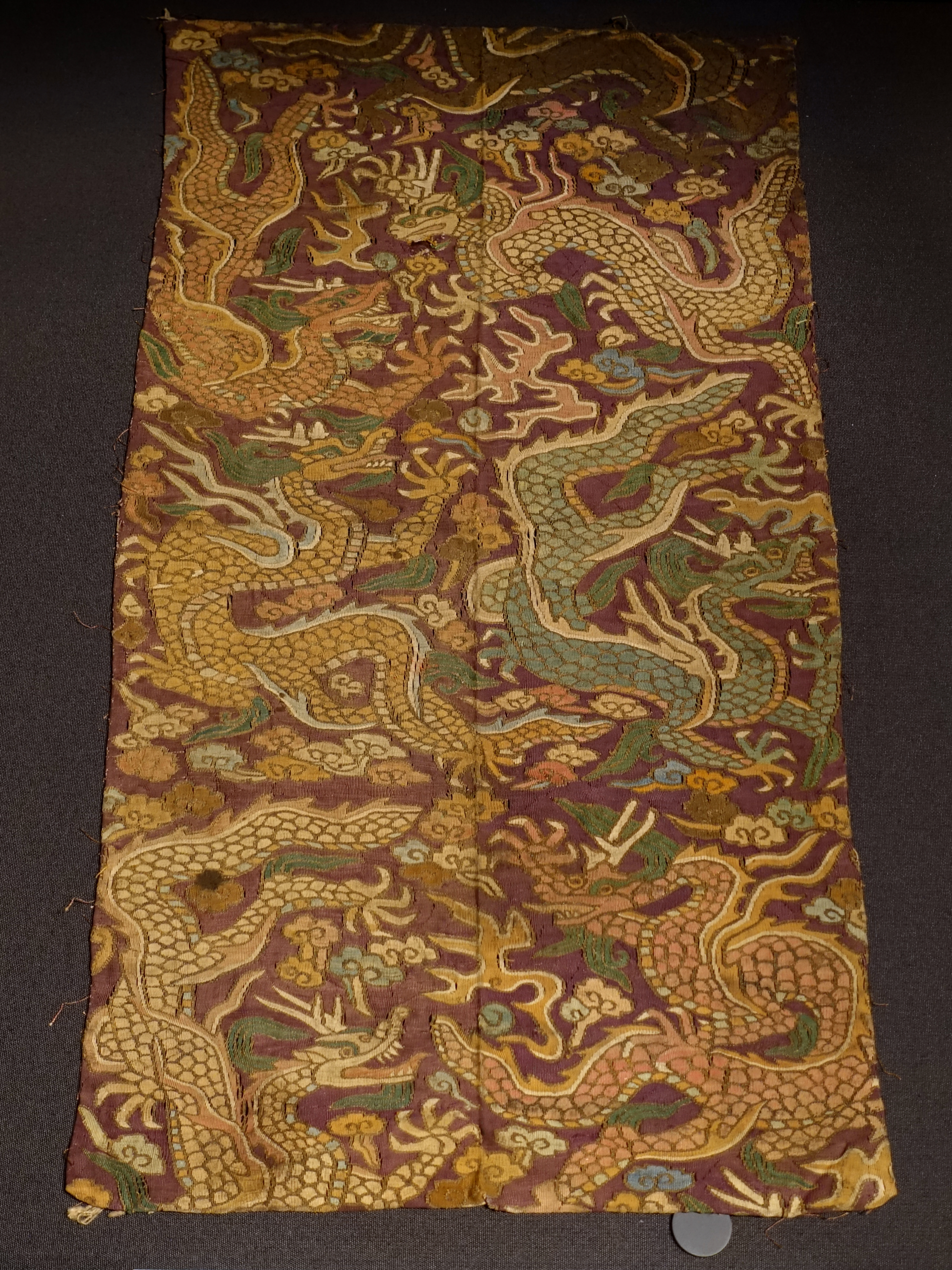
Textile with dragon design, Yuan dynasty

This description accords with the artistic depictions of the dragon down to the present day. The dragon has also acquired an almost unlimited range of supernatural powers. It is said to be able to disguise itself as a silkworm, or become as large as the entire world. It can fly among the clouds or hide in water (according to the Guanzi), and also become invisible or change its length (according to the Shuowen Jiezi).

In many other countries, folktales speak of the dragon having all the attributes of the other 11 creatures of the zodiac, this includes the whiskers of the Rat, the face and horns of the Ox, the claws and teeth of the Tiger, the belly of the Rabbit, the body of the Snake, the legs of the Horse, the goatee of the Goat, the wit of the Monkey, the crest of the Rooster, the ears of the Dog, and the snout of the Pig.

In some circles, it is considered bad luck to depict a dragon facing downward, as it is seen as disrespectful to place a dragon in such a manner that it cannot ascend to the sky. Also, depictions of dragons in tattoos are prevalent as they are symbols of strength and power, especially criminal organisations where dragons hold a meaning all on their own. As such, it is believed that one must be fierce and strong enough, hence earning the right to wear the dragon on his skin, lest his luck be consumed by the dragons.

According to an art historian John Boardman, depictions of Chinese Dragon and Indian Makara might have been influenced by Cetus in Greek mythology possibly after contact with silk-road images of the Kētos as Chinese dragon appeared more reptilian and shifted head-shape afterwards.

=== Rule over weather and water ===
Chinese dragons are strongly associated with water and weather in popular religion. They are believed to be the rulers of moving bodies of water, such as waterfalls, rivers, or seas. The Dragon god is the dispenser of rain as well as the zoomorphic representation of yang, the masculine power of generation. In this capacity as the rulers of water and weather, the dragon is more anthropomorphic in form, often depicted as a humanoid, dressed in a king's costume, but with a dragon head wearing a king's headdress.

There are four major Dragon Kings, representing each of the Four Seas: the East Sea (corresponding to the East China Sea also, parts of the Pacific), the South Sea (corresponding to the South China Sea, West Philippines Sea ), the West Sea (The Qinghai Lake sometimes also, referred to Indian Ocean and the Bay of Bengal), and the North Sea corresponding to the (Lake Baikal, sometimes also the Sea of Japan and the Arctic Ocean). (Main article Dragon Kings of the Four Seas)

Because of this association, they are seen as "in charge" of water-related weather phenomena. In premodern times, many Chinese villages (especially those close to rivers and seas) had temples dedicated to their local "dragon king". In times of drought or flooding, it was customary for the local gentry and government officials to lead the community in offering sacrifices and conducting other religious rites to appease the dragon, either to ask for rain or a cessation thereof.

The King of Wuyue in the Five Dynasties and Ten Kingdoms period was often known as the "Dragon King" or the "Sea Dragon King" because of his extensive hydro-engineering schemes which "tamed" the sea.

In coastal regions of China, Korea, Vietnam, traditional legends and worshipping of whale gods as the guardians of people on the sea have been referred to Dragon Kings after the arrival of Buddhism.

=== Symbol of Imperial authority ===
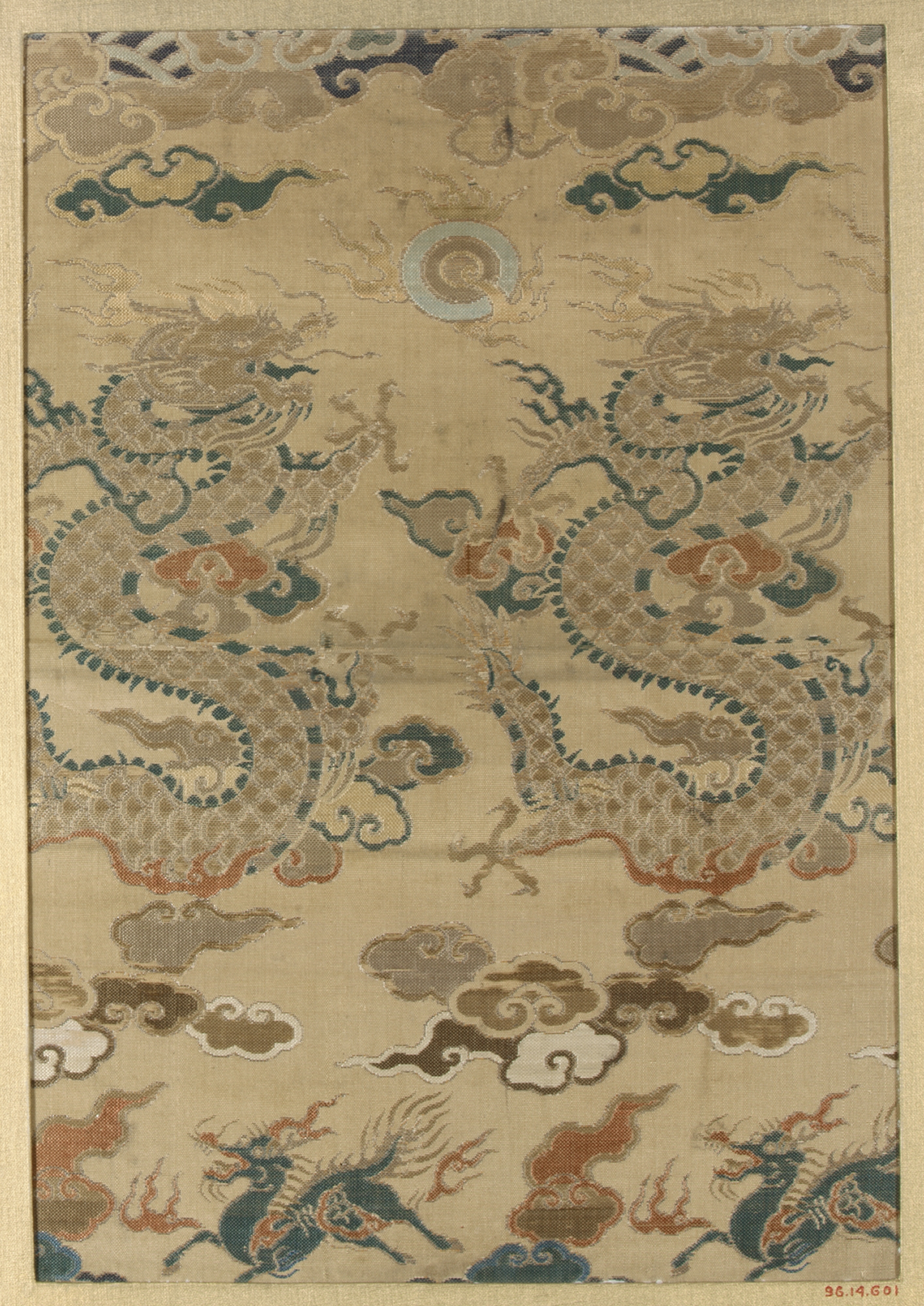
Double dragons on a piece of textile, Qing dynasty

According to Chinese legend, both Chinese primogenitors, the earliest Door and the Yellow Emperor, were closely related to the dragon. At the end of his reign, the first legendary ruler, the Yellow Emperor, was said to have been immortalized into a dragon that resembled his emblem, and ascended to Heaven. The other legendary ruler, the Yan Emperor, was born by his mother's telepathy with a mythical dragon. This legend also contributed towards the use of the Chinese dragon as a symbol of imperial power.

Dragons (usually with five claws on each foot) were a symbol for the emperor in many Chinese dynasties. During the Qing dynasty, the imperial dragon was colored yellow or gold, and during the Ming dynasty it was red. The imperial throne was referred to as the Dragon Throne. During the late Qing dynasty, the dragon was even adopted as the national flag. Dragons are featured in carvings on the stairs and walkways of imperial palaces and imperial tombs, such as at the Forbidden City in Beijing.

In some Chinese legends, an emperor might be born with a birthmark in the shape of a dragon. For example, one legend tells the tale of a peasant born with a dragon birthmark who eventually overthrows the existing dynasty and founds a new one; another legend might tell of the prince in hiding from his enemies who is identified by his dragon birthmark.

In contrast, the empress of China was often identified with the Chinese phoenix.

=== Modern practice ===
Worship of the Dragon god is celebrated throughout China with sacrifices and processions during the fifth and sixth moons, and especially on the date of his birthday the thirteenth day of the sixth moon. A folk religious movement of associations of good-doing in modern Hebei is primarily devoted to a generic Dragon god whose icon is a tablet with his name inscribed, for which it has been named the "movement of the Dragon Tablet".

== Depictions ==
=== Neolithic ===
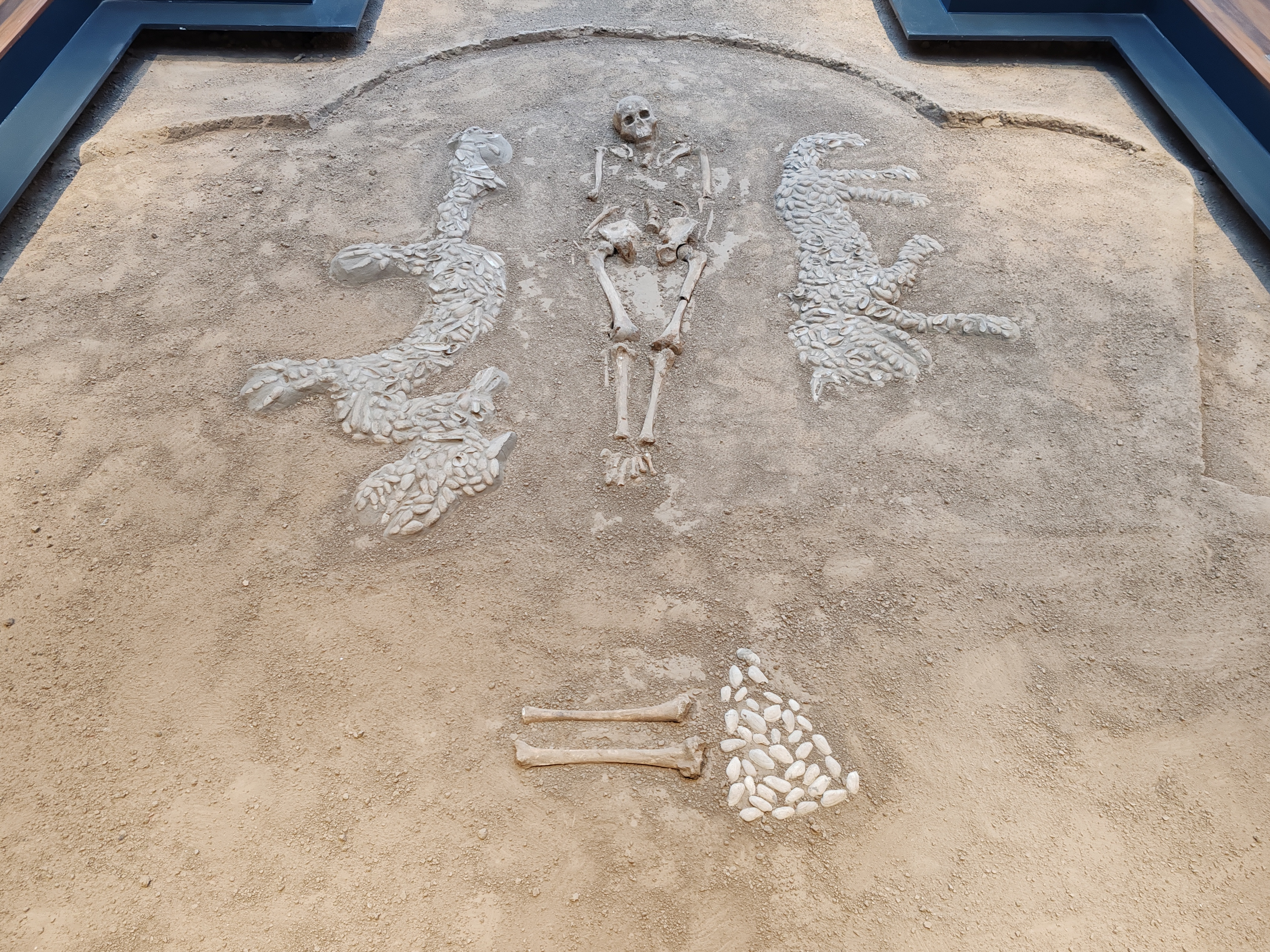
So-called 'first dragon of China' (中华第一龙); it was discovered in 1987 at the Yangshao culture site in Xishuipo, west of Puyang, Henan. On both sides of the skeleton of a middle-aged male in the center of a tomb chamber, carefully arranged clam shells formed dragon and tiger patterns.

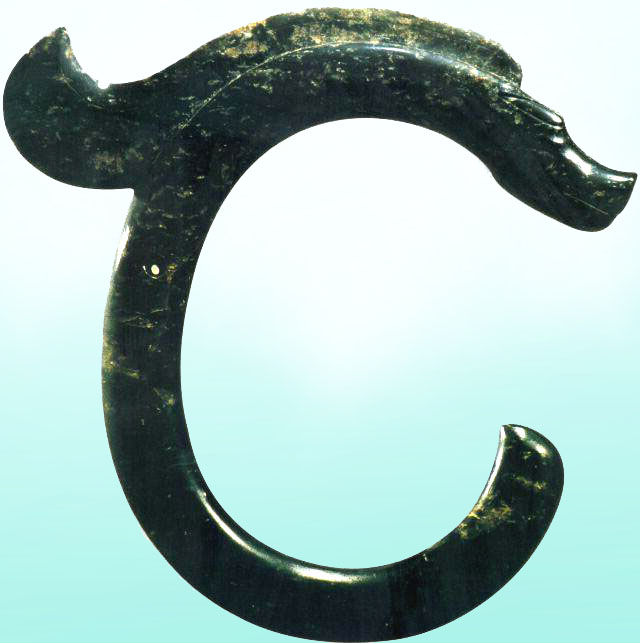
The C-shaped jade totem of Hongshan culture (c. 4700–2920 BC)

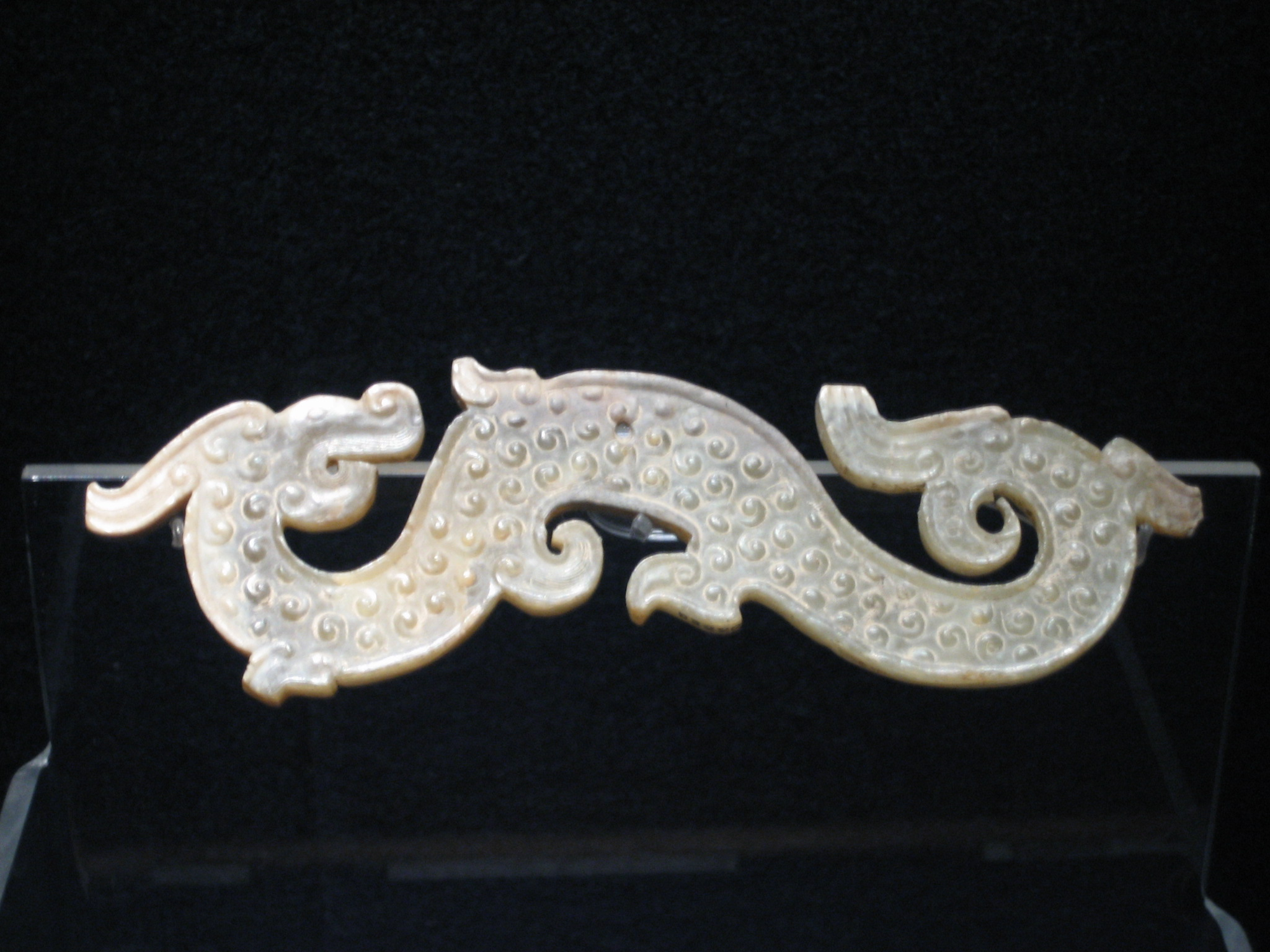
Warring States era dragon jade pendant.

Dragons or dragon-like depictions have been found extensively in Neolithic-period archaeological sites throughout China. Some of earliest depictions of dragons were found at Xinglongwa culture sites. Yangshao culture sites in Xi'an have produced clay pots with dragon motifs. A burial site Xishuipo in Puyang which is associated with the Yangshao culture shows a large dragon mosaic made out of clam shells. The Liangzhu culture also produced dragon-like patterns. The Hongshan culture sites in present-day Inner Mongolia produced jade dragon objects in the form of pig dragons which are the first 3-dimensional representations of Chinese dragons.

One such early form was the pig dragon. It is a coiled, elongated creature with a head resembling a boar. The character for "dragon" in the earliest Chinese writing has a similar coiled form, as do later jade dragon amulets from the Shang dynasty. A snake-like dragon body painted on red pottery wares was discovered at Taosi (Shanxi) from the second phase of the Longshan Culture, and a dragon-like object coated with approximately 2000 pieces of turquoise and jade was discovered at Erlitou.

=== Classical era ===
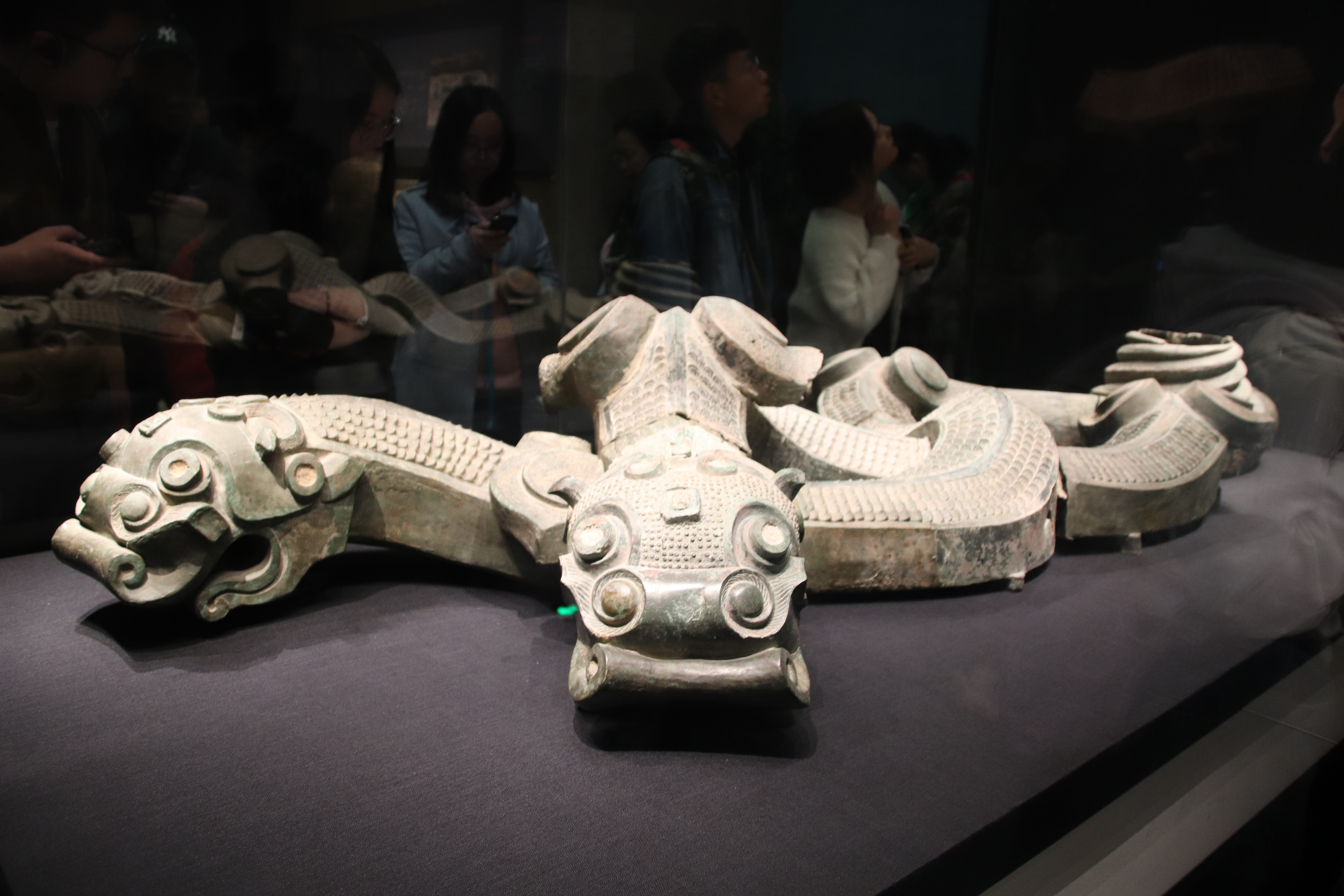
Qin dynasty twin bronze dragons, found near the Mausoleum of the First Qin Emperor.

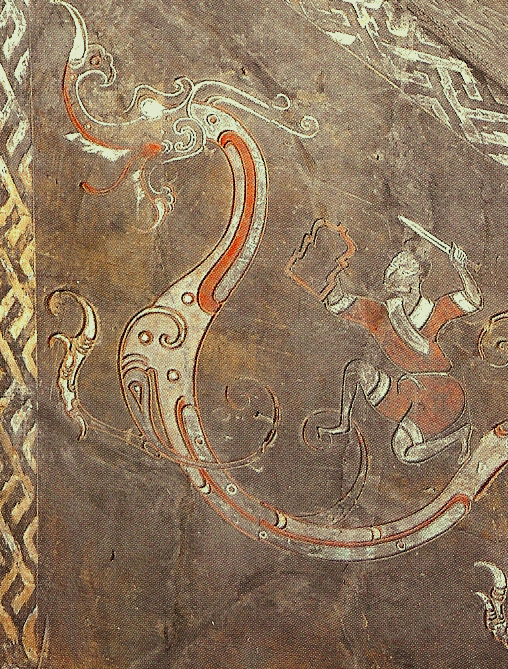
Western Han dynasty tomb mural of a warrior on a dragon, found in Luoyang.

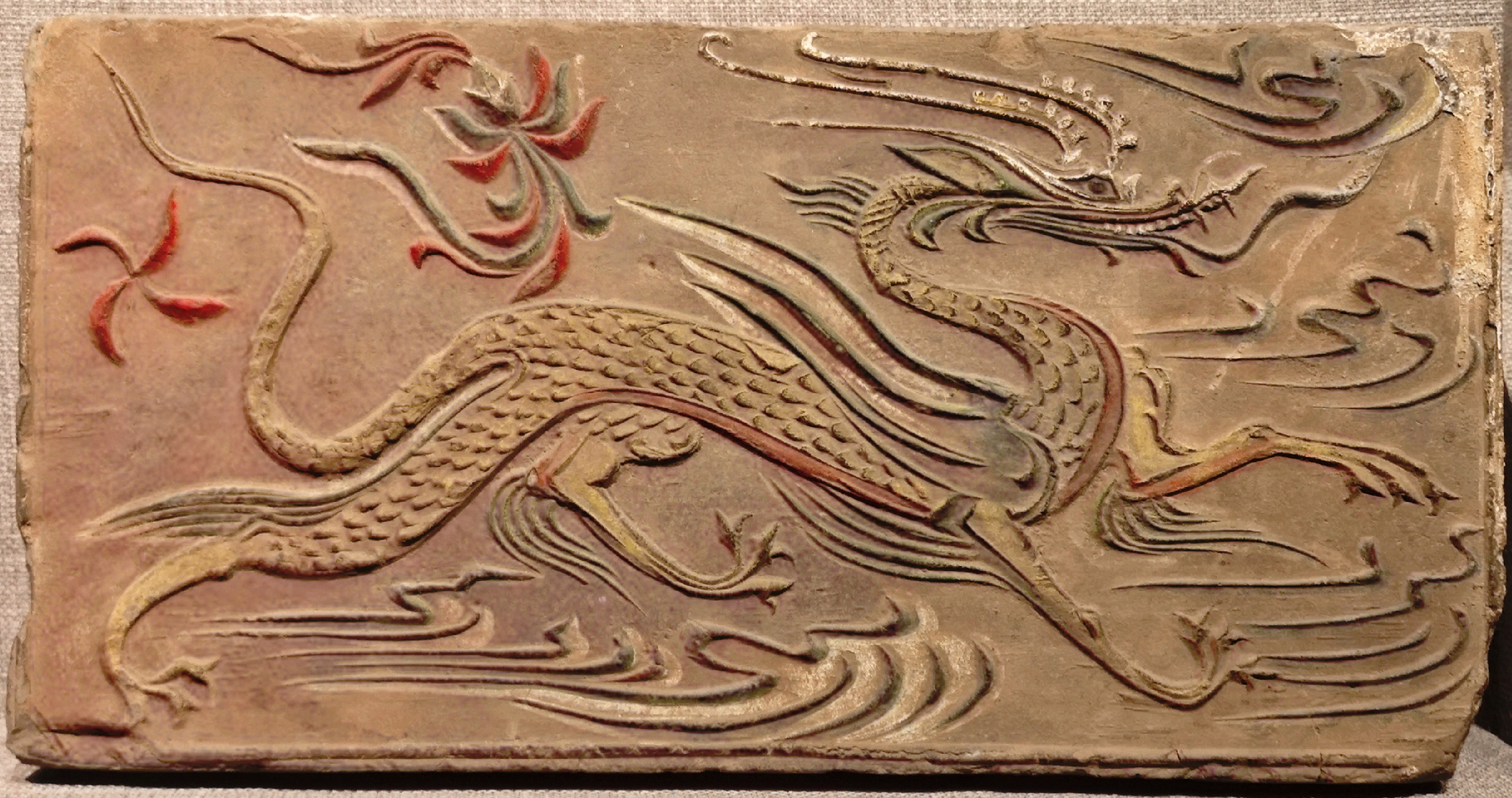
Dragon on a tomb brick relief from the Northern and Southern dynasties.

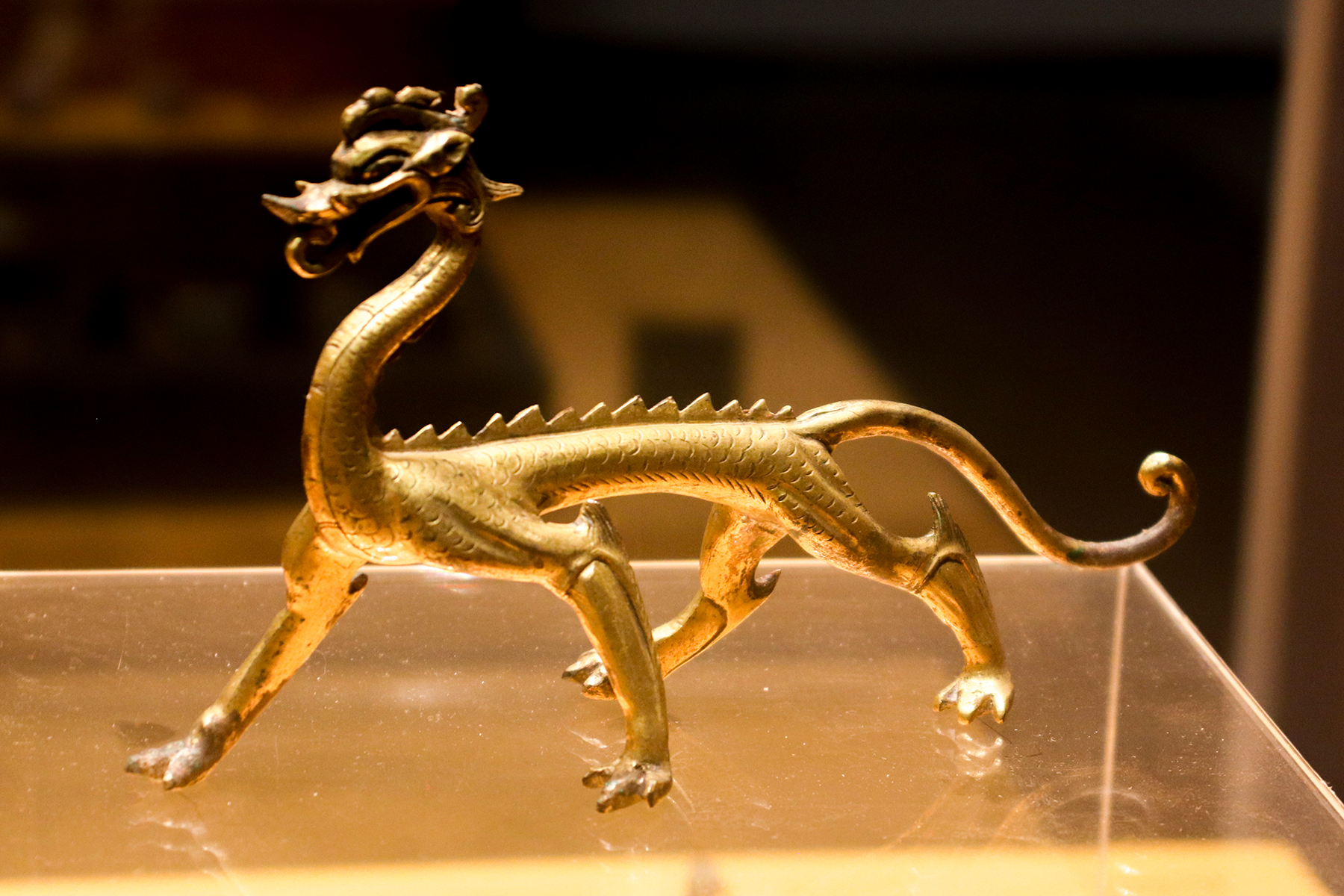
Gilded Walking Dragon of Tang dynasty

Chinese literature and myths refer to many dragons besides the famous long. The linguist Michael Carr analyzed over 100 ancient dragon names attested in Chinese classic texts.

- Tianlong, celestial dragon that guards heavenly palaces and pulls divine chariots; also a name for the constellation Draco
- Shenlong, thunder god that controls the weather, appearance of a human head, dragon's body, and drum-like stomach
- Fuzanglong, underworld guardian of precious metals and jewels, associated with volcanoes
- Dilong, controller of rivers and seas
- Yinglong, winged dragon associated with rains and floods, used by Yellow Emperor to kill Chi You
- Jiaolong, hornless or scaled dragon, leader of all aquatic animals
- Panlong, lake dragon that has not ascended to heaven
- Huanglong, hornless dragon symbolizing the emperor
- Feilong, winged dragon that rides on clouds and mist; also a name for a genus of pterosaur (compare Feilong kick and Fei Long character)
- Azure Dragon, the animal associated with the East in the Chinese Four Symbols, mythological creatures in the Chinese constellations
- Qiulong, contradictorily defined as both "horned dragon" and "hornless dragon"
- Zhulong was a giant red draconic solar deity in Chinese mythology. It supposedly had a human's face and snake's body, created day and night by opening and closing its eyes, and created seasonal winds by breathing. (Note that this zhulong is different from the similarly named Vermilion Dragon or the Pig dragon)
- Chilong, a hornless dragon or mountain demon

Fewer Chinese dragon names derive from the word long 龍:

- Longwang, divine rulers of the Four Seas
- Longma, emerged from the Luo River and revealed bagua to Fu Xi

Some additional Chinese dragons are not named long, for instance,

- Hong, a two-headed dragon or rainbow serpent
- Shen, a shapeshifting dragon or sea monster believed to create mirages
- Bashe was a giant python-like dragon that ate elephants
- Teng is a flying dragon without legs

Chinese scholars have classified dragons in diverse systems. For instance, Emperor Huizong of Song canonized five colored dragons as "kings". (Main article Dragon Kings of the Five Regions)

- The Azure Dragon [Qinglong 青龍] spirits, most compassionate kings.
- The Vermilion Dragon [Zhulong 朱龍 or Chilong 赤龍] spirits, kings that bestow blessings on lakes.
- The Yellow Dragon [Huanglong 黃龍] spirits, kings that favorably hear all petitions.
- The White Dragon [Bailong 白龍] spirits, virtuous and pure kings.
- The Black Dragon [Xuanlong 玄龍 or Heilong 黑龍] spirits, kings dwelling in the depths of the mystic waters.

With the addition of the Yellow Dragon of the center to Azure Dragon of the East, these Vermilion, White, and Black Dragons coordinate with the Four Symbols, including the Vermilion Bird of the South, White Tiger of the West, and Black Tortoise of the North. (Main article the Four Symbols)

Dragons were varyingly thought to be able to control and embody various natural elements in their "mythic form" such as "water, air, earth, fire, light, wind, storm, [and] electricity". Some dragons who were able to breathe fire were thought to be exiled from tiān and banished to Earth.

=== Nine sons of the dragon ===
Several Ming dynasty texts list what were claimed as the Nine Offspring of the Dragon (龍生九子), and subsequently these feature prominently in popular Chinese stories and writings. The scholar Xie Zhaozhe (1567–1624) in his work Wu Za Zu Wuzazu (c. 1592) gives the following listing, as rendered by M. W. de Visser:

A well-known work of the end of the sixteenth century, the Wuzazu 五雜俎, informs us about the nine different young of the dragon, whose shapes are used as ornaments according to their nature.

- The Pulao, four leg small form dragon class which like to scream, are represented on the tops of bells, serving as handles.
- The qiú niú 囚牛, which like music, are used to adorn musical instruments.
- The Chiwen, which like swallowing, are placed on both ends of the ridgepoles of roofs (to swallow all evil influences).
- The cháo fēng 嘲風, beasts-like dragon which like adventure, are placed on the four corners of roofs.
- The yá zì 睚眦, which like to kill, are engraved on sword guards.
- The xì xì 屓屭, which have the shape of the chī hǔ 螭虎 (One kind small form dragon), and are fond of literature, are represented on the sides of grave-monuments.
- The bì àn 狴犴, which like litigation, are placed over prison gates (to keep guard).
- The suān ní 狻猊, which like to sit down, are represented upon the bases of Buddhist idols (under the Buddhas' or Bodhisattvas' feet).
- The Bixi, also known as bà xià 霸下, finally, big tortoises which like to carry heavy objects, are placed under grave-monuments.

Further, the same author enumerates nine other kinds of dragons, which are represented as ornaments of different objects or buildings according to their liking prisons, water, the rank smell of newly caught fish or newly killed meat, wind and rain, ornaments, smoke, shutting the mouth (used for adorning key-holes), standing on steep places (placed on roofs), and fire.

The Sheng'an waiji (升庵外集) collection by the poet Yang Shen (1488–1559) gives different 5th and 9th names for the dragon's nine children: the taotie, form of beasts, which loves to eat and is found on food-related wares, and the jiāo tú (椒圖), which looks like a conch or clam, does not like to be disturbed, and is used on the front door or the doorstep. Yang's list is bì xì, chī wěn or cháo fēng, pú láo, bì àn, tāo tiè, qiú niú, yá zì, suān ní, and jiāo tú. In addition, there are some sayings including bā xià 𧈢𧏡, Hybrid of reptilia animal and dragon, a creature that likes to drink water, and is typically used on bridge structures.

The oldest known attestation of the "children of the dragon" list is found in the Shuyuan zaji (菽園雜記, Miscellaneous records from the bean garden) by Lu Rong (1436–1494); however, he noted that the list enumerates mere synonyms of various antiques, not children of a dragon. The nine sons of the dragon were commemorated by the Shanghai Mint in 2012's year of the dragon with two sets of coins, one in silver, and one in brass. Each coin in the sets depicts one of the 9 sons, including an additional coin for the father dragon, which depicts the nine sons on the reverse. It's also a Chinese idiom, which means among brothers each one has his good points.

=== Dragon claws ===
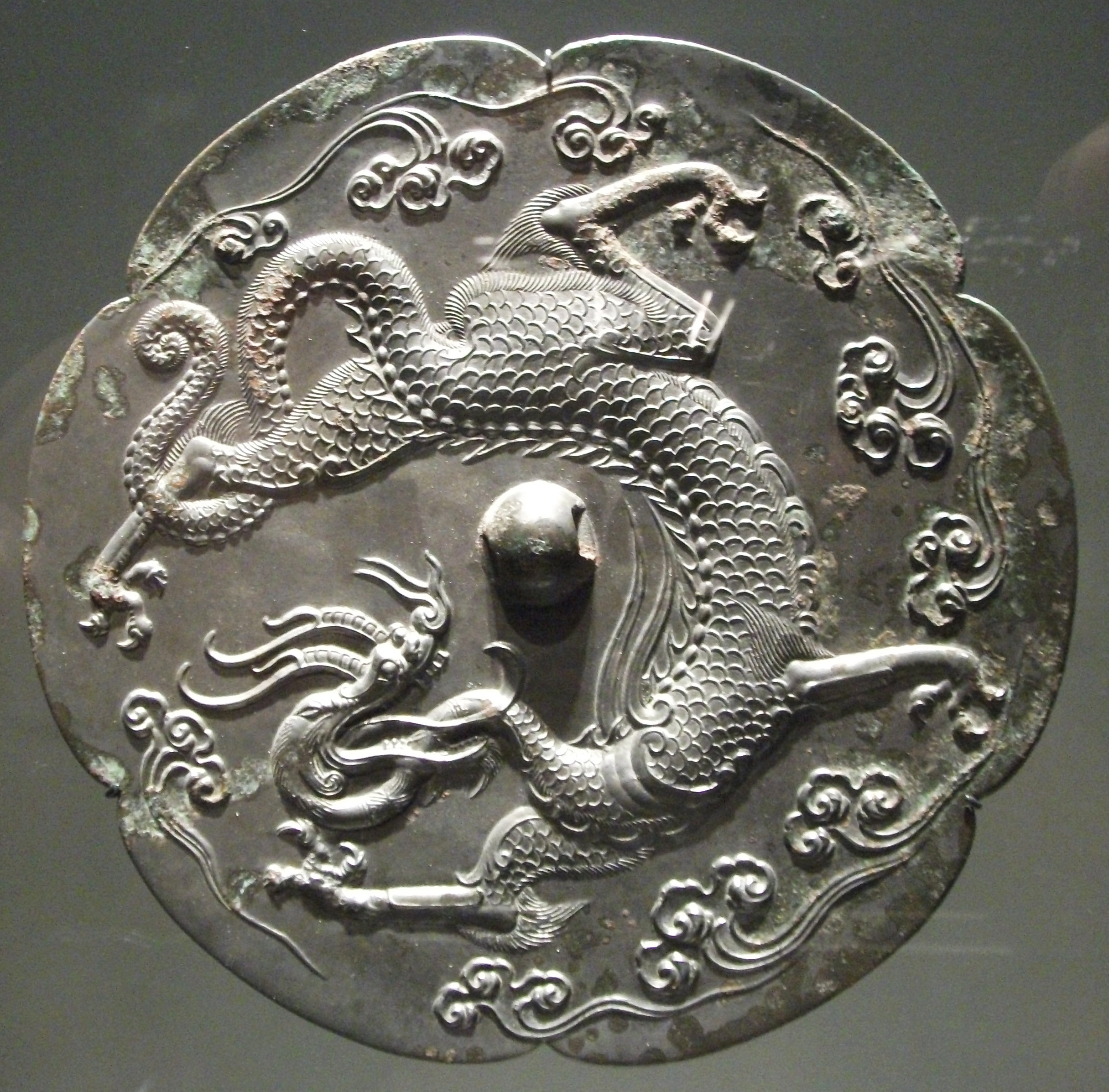
Reverse of bronze mirror, 8th century, Tang dynasty, showing a dragon with three toes on each foot

Originally, early Chinese dragons are mostly depicted with three claws, but they can range from two to five claws. Different countries that adopted the Chinese dragon have different preferences; in Mongolia and Korea, four-clawed dragons are used, while in Japan, three-clawed dragons are common. In China, three-clawed dragons were popularly used on robes during the Tang dynasty. The usage of the dragon motif was codified during the Yuan dynasty, and the five-clawed dragons became reserved for use by the emperor while the princes used four-clawed dragons. Phoenixes and five-clawed two-horned dragons may not be used on the robes of officials and other objects such as plates and vessels in the Yuan dynasty. It was further stipulated that for commoners, "it is forbidden to wear any cloth with patterns of Qilin, Male Fenghuang (Chinese phoenix), White rabbit, Lingzhi, Five-Toe Two-Horn Dragon, Eight Dragons, Nine Dragons, 'Ten thousand years', Fortune-longevity character and Golden Yellow etc."

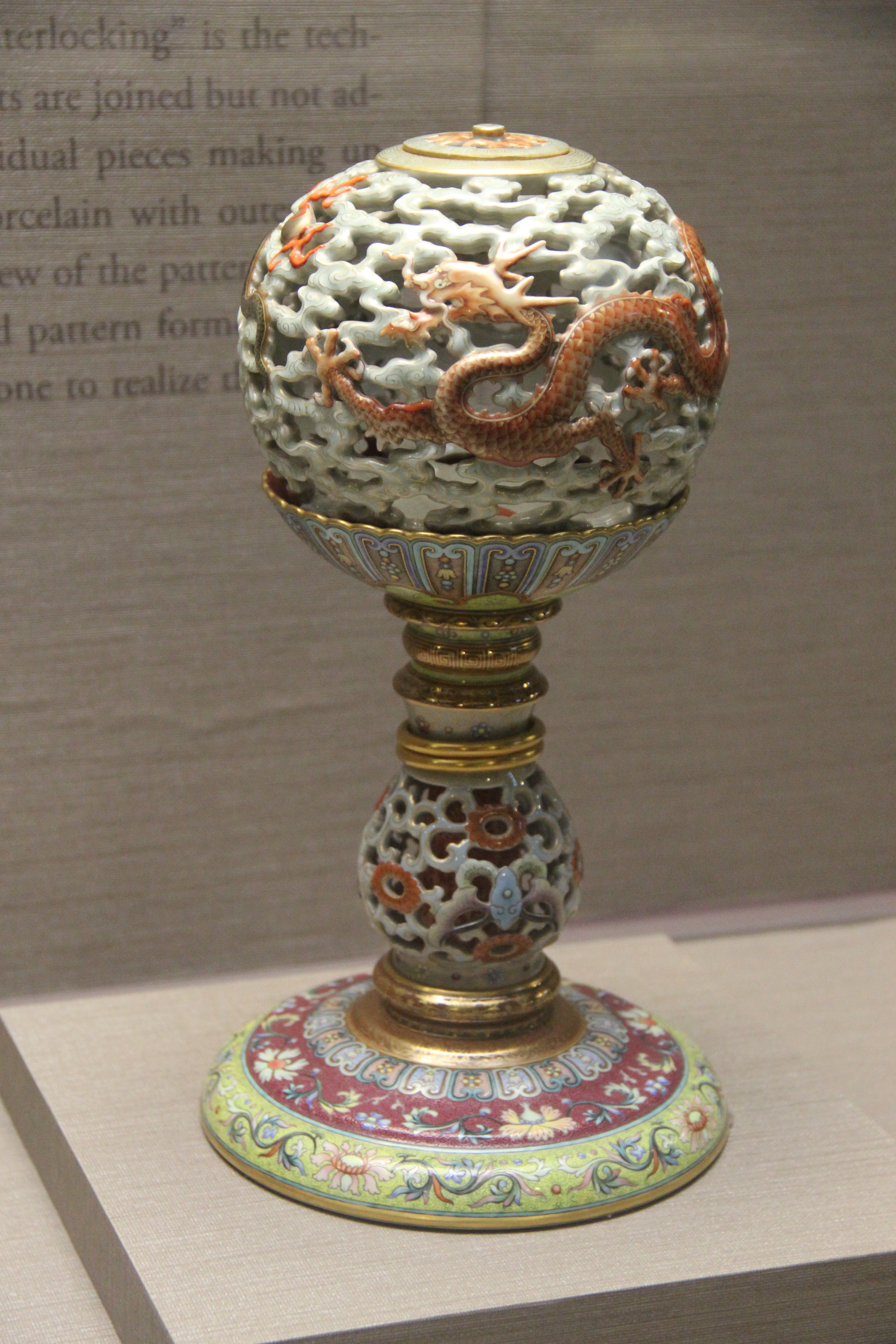
18th century five-clawed dragon on porcelain ball, Qing dynasty

The Hongwu Emperor of the Ming dynasty emulated the Yuan dynasty rules on the use of the dragon motif and decreed that the dragon would be his emblem and that it should have five claws. The four-clawed dragon would be used typically for imperial nobility and certain high-ranking officials. The three-clawed dragon was used by lower ranks and the general public (widely seen on various Chinese goods in the Ming dynasty). The dragon, however, was only for select royalty closely associated with the imperial family, usually in various symbolic colors, and it was a capital offense for anyone—other than the emperor himself—to ever use the completely gold-colored, five-clawed Long dragon motif. Improper use of claw number or colors was considered treason, punishable by execution of the offender's entire clan. During the Qing dynasty, the Manchus initially considered three-clawed dragons the most sacred and used that until 1712 when it was replaced by five-clawed dragons, and portraits of the Qing emperors were usually depicted with five-clawed dragons.

In works of art that left the imperial collection, either as gifts or through pilfering by court eunuchs (a long-standing problem), where practicable, one claw was removed from each set, as in several pieces of carved lacquerware, for example the Chinese lacquerware table in the Victoria and Albert Museum in London.

== Cultural references ==
=== Number nine ===
The number nine is special in China as it is seen as the number of heaven, and Chinese dragons are frequently connected with it. For example, a Chinese dragon is normally described in terms of nine attributes and usually has 117 (9×13) scales—81 (9×9) Yang and 36 (9×4) Yin. This is also why there are nine forms of the dragon and nine sons of the dragon (see Classical depictions above). The Nine-Dragon Wall is a spirit wall with images of nine different dragons, and is found in imperial Chinese palaces and gardens. Because nine was considered the number of the emperor, only the most senior officials were allowed to wear nine dragons on their robes—and then only with the robe completely covered with surcoats. Lower-ranking officials had eight or five dragons on their robes, again covered with surcoats; even the emperor himself wore his dragon robe with one of its nine dragons hidden from view.

There are a number of places in China called "Nine Dragons", the most famous being Kowloon in Hong Kong. The part of the Mekong in Vietnam is known as Cửu Long, with the same meaning.

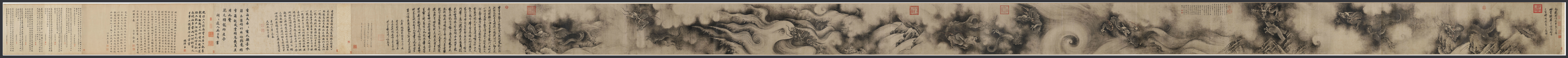
A close up view of one full dragon (and the tail end and claw of another) from the Nine Dragons handscroll painted in 1244 by Song dynasty artist Chen Rong

=== Chinese zodiac ===
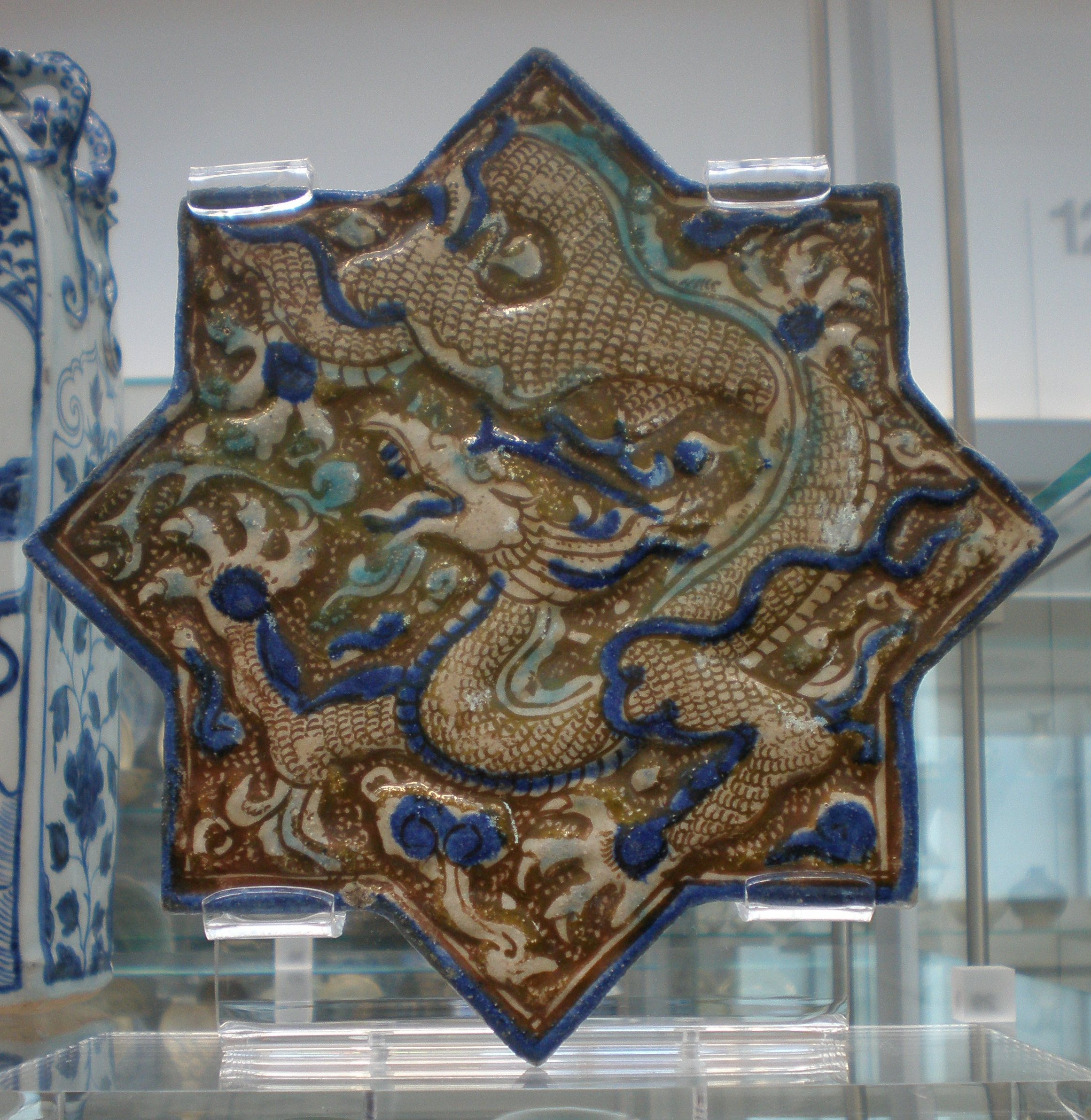
Wall tile depicting the Azure Dragon of the East, Ilkhanate

The dragon is one of the 12 animals in the Chinese zodiac which is used to designate years in the Chinese calendar. It is thought that each animal is associated with certain personality traits. Dragon years are usually the most popular to have children. There are more people born in Dragon years than in any other animal years of the zodiac.

=== Constellations ===
The Azure Dragon is considered to be the primary of the four celestial guardians, the other three being the Vermilion Bird, White Tiger, Black Tortoise. In this context, the Azure Dragon is associated with the East and the element of Wood.

=== Dragon boat racing ===
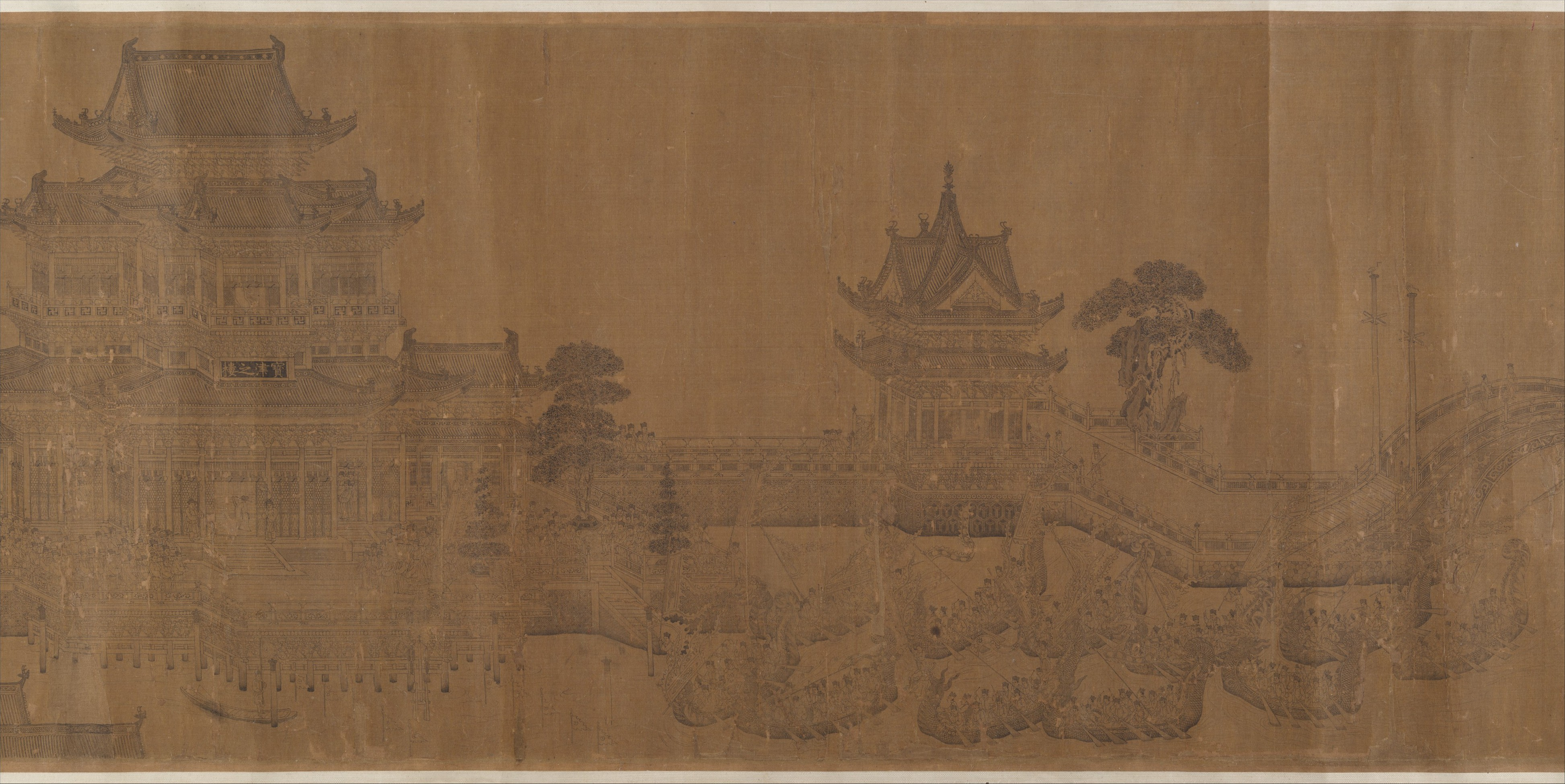
Dragon boats racing in Hong Kong (14th century painting)

At special festivals, especially the Dragon Boat Festival, dragon boat races are an important part of festivities. Typically, these are boats paddled by a team of up to 20 paddlers with a drummer and steersman. The boats have a carved dragon as the head and tail of the boat. Dragon boat racing is also an important part of celebrations outside of China, such as at Chinese New Year.

A similar racing is popular in India in the state of Kerala called Vallamkali and there are records on Chinese traders visiting the seashores of Kerala centuries back (Ibn Batuta). (Main article Vallam Kali)

=== Dragon dance ===
On auspicious occasions, including Chinese New Year and the opening of shops and residences, festivities often include dancing with dragon puppets. These are "life sized" cloth-and-wood puppets manipulated by a team of people, supporting the dragon with poles. They perform choreographed moves to the accompaniment of drums, drama, and music. They also wore good clothing made of silk.

=== With Fenghuang ===
Fenghuang (simplified Chinese: 凤凰; traditional Chinese: 鳳凰; pinyin: fènghuáng; Wade–Giles: fêng^{⁴}-huang^{²}), known in Japanese as Hō-ō or Hou-ou, are phoenix-like birds found in East Asian mythology that reign over all other birds. In Chinese symbolism, it is a feminine entity that is paired with the masculine Chinese dragon, as a visual metaphor of a balanced and blissful relationship, symbolic of both a happy marriage and a regent's long reign.

=== As Nāga ===
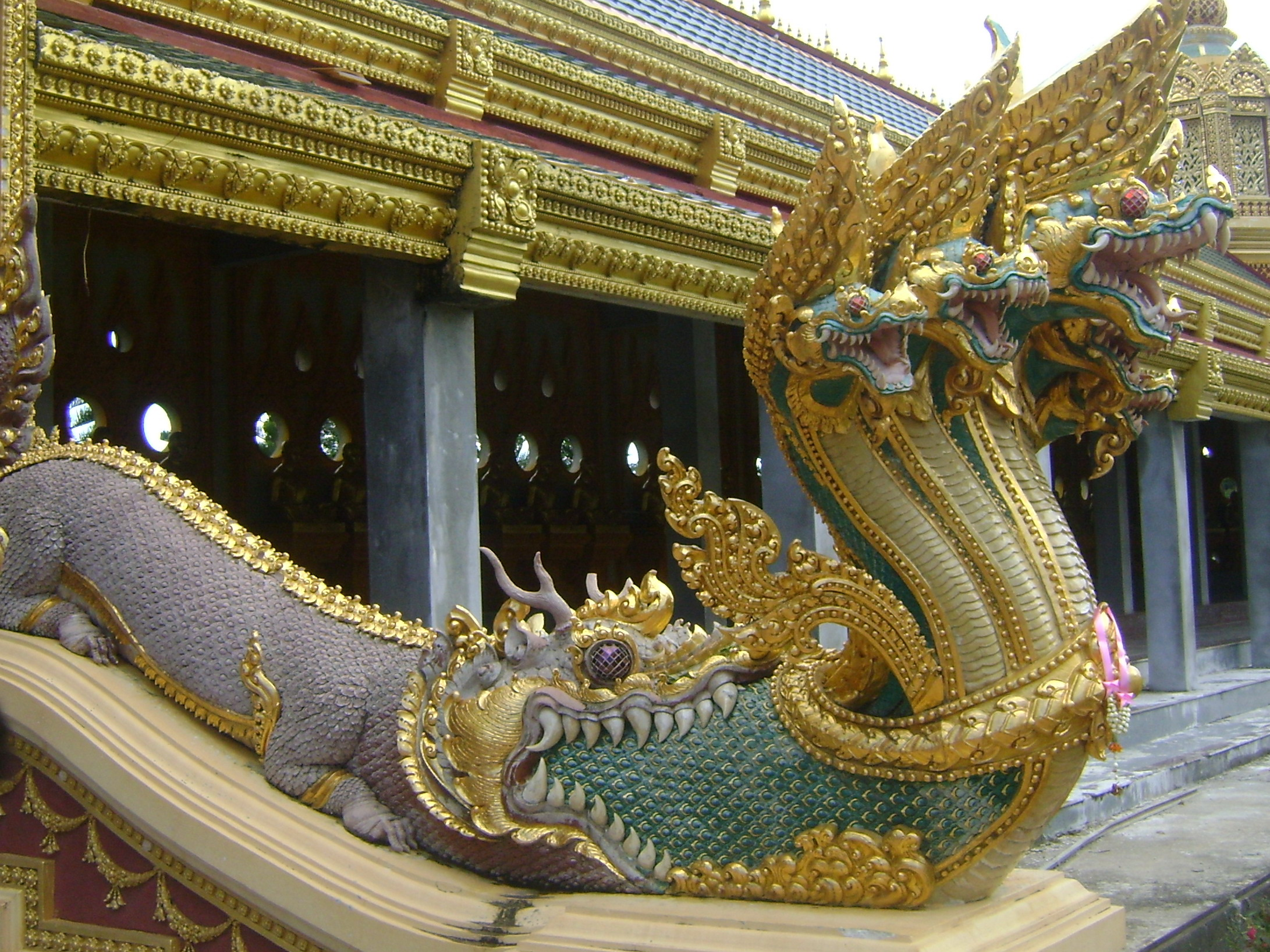
Phra Maha Chedi Chai Mongkol Naga emerging from mouth of Makara

In South and Southeast Asian countries, the concept of the nāga has been merged with local traditions of great and wise serpents or dragons, as depicted in this stairway image of a multi-headed nāga emerging from the mouth of a Makara in the style of a Chinese dragon at Phra Maha Chedi Chai Mongkol on the premises of Wat Pha Namthip Thep Prasit Vararam in Nong Phok District, Roi Et Province, Thailand. (Main article Nagaraja)

The concept of "Dragon King/Longwang" for "Loongs" in China came from Indian concept of "Nagaraja" via Buddhism. (Main article Dragon King)

=== With Tigers ===
The tiger is considered to be the eternal rival to the dragon, thus various artworks depict a dragon and tiger fighting an epic battle, also the resemblances of Yin and Yang. A common chengyu to describe equal rivals is "dragon versus Tiger". In Chinese martial arts, "Dragon style" is used to describe styles of fighting based more on understanding movement, while "Tiger style" is based on brute strength and memorization of techniques. (Main article Animal styles in Chinese martial arts)

=== Botany ===
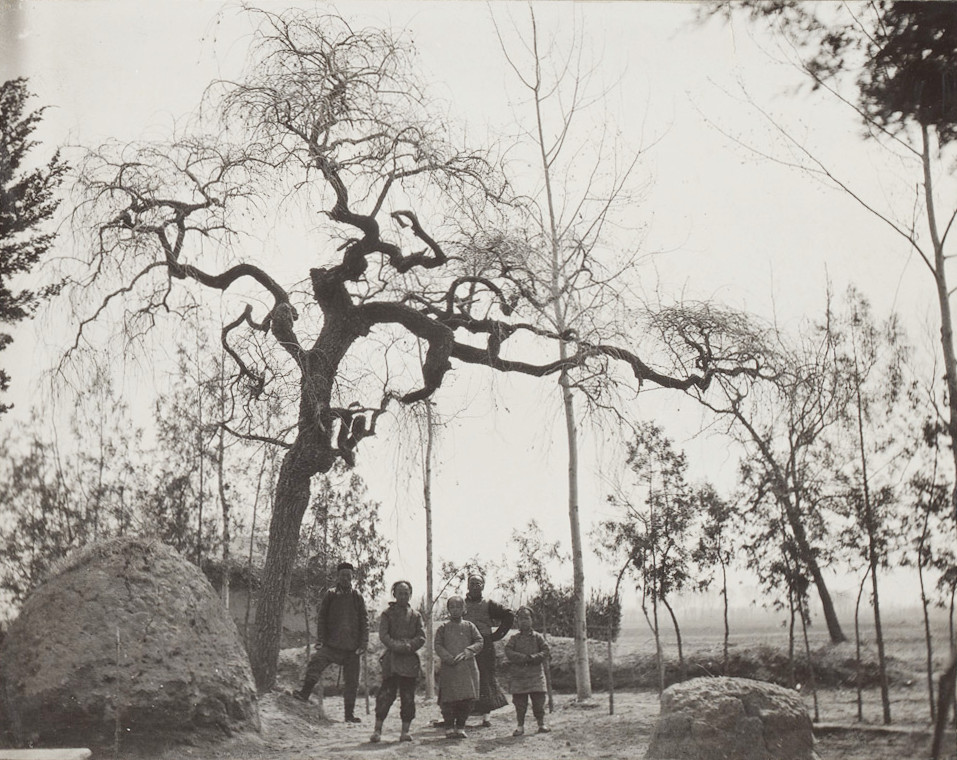
'Dragon's-Claw Elm', Fengtai, 1908

The elm cultivar Ulmus pumila 'Pendula', from northern China, called 'weeping Chinese elm' in the West, is known locally as Lung chao yü shu ('Dragon's-claw elm') owing to its branching.

=== Language ===
A number of Chinese proverbs and idioms feature references to a dragon, such as "Hoping one's child will become a dragon" (simplified Chinese: 望子成龙; traditional Chinese: 望子成龍; pinyin: wàng zǐ chéng lóng; Jyutping: mong6 zi2 sing4 lung4).

== In popular culture ==
As a part of traditional folklore, dragons appear in a variety of mythological fiction. Chinese dragons appear in innumerable media across popular culture today, including but not at all limited to: Japanese anime and tokusatsu films and television shows, manga, and in Western political cartoons as a personification of the People's Republic of China.

- In the classical 16th century novel Journey to the West, the son of the Dragon King of the West was condemned to serve as a horse for the travelers because of his indiscretions at a party in the heavenly court. Sun Wukong's staff, the Ruyi Jingu Bang, was robbed from Ao Guang, the Dragon King of the East Sea.
- In Fengshen Yanyi and other stories, Nezha, the boy hero, defeats the Dragon Kings and tames the seas.

== Related myths ==
- Druk, the Thunder Dragon of Bhutanese mythology
- Nāga, a Hindu and Buddhist creature in South Asian and Southeast Asian mythology
  - Bakunawa, a moon-eating sea dragon depicted in Philippine mythology.
- Azhdar, snake-like dragons in Iranian mythology
- Pakhangba, a Manipuri dragon

== See also ==
- Serpent symbolism
- List of dragons in mythology and folklore
- List of dragons in popular culture
- Long Mu
- Radical 212
- Awanyu
- Horned Serpent
- Feathered Serpent
