= Yang Sheng =

Yang Sheng or Yangsheng or variation, may refer to:

== People ==
=== Surnamed "Yang" given named "Sheng" ===
- Yáng Shēng (楊昇; born 1993), Australian-rules footballer
- Yang Sheng (杨晟; turn of the 20th century), Ambassador for China to Germany; see List of ambassadors of China to Germany
- Yang Sheng (楊昇; 1399–1441), Chieftain of the Chiefdom of Bozhou
- Yang Sheng (楊升), a master of the Mogu style of traditional Chinese painting during the Tang Dynasty
- Yang Sheng (羊勝; 2nd century BCE), retainer to Liu Wu, Prince of Liang of the Han Dynasty
- Yang Sheng (楊盛; turn of the 5th century CE, Sixteen Kingdoms era), Duke of Chouchi

=== Given named "Yang-sheng" ===
- Duke Dao of Qi (born Lü Yangsheng 呂陽生; died 485 BCE), ruler of the State of Qi
- Kao Yang-sheng (高揚昇; born 1952), Taiwanese politician
- Lou Yangsheng (楼阳生, born 1959), Chinese politician, Communist Party Secretary of Henan
- Zhao Yangsheng (赵阳升, born 1955), professor at Taiyuan University of Technology

== Other uses ==
- Yangsheng (Daoism) (Chinese: 養生), a concept in religious Daoism traditional Chinese medicine

== See also ==
- Yan Sheng (disambiguation)
- Sheng (disambiguation)
- Yang (disambiguation)
- Shengyang
- Shen Yang (disambiguation)
