= Pulao (dragon) =

Creature in Chinese mythology

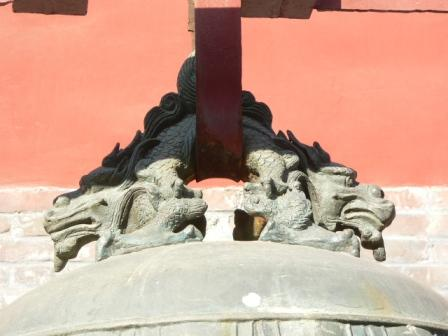
A bell hanging by its pulao

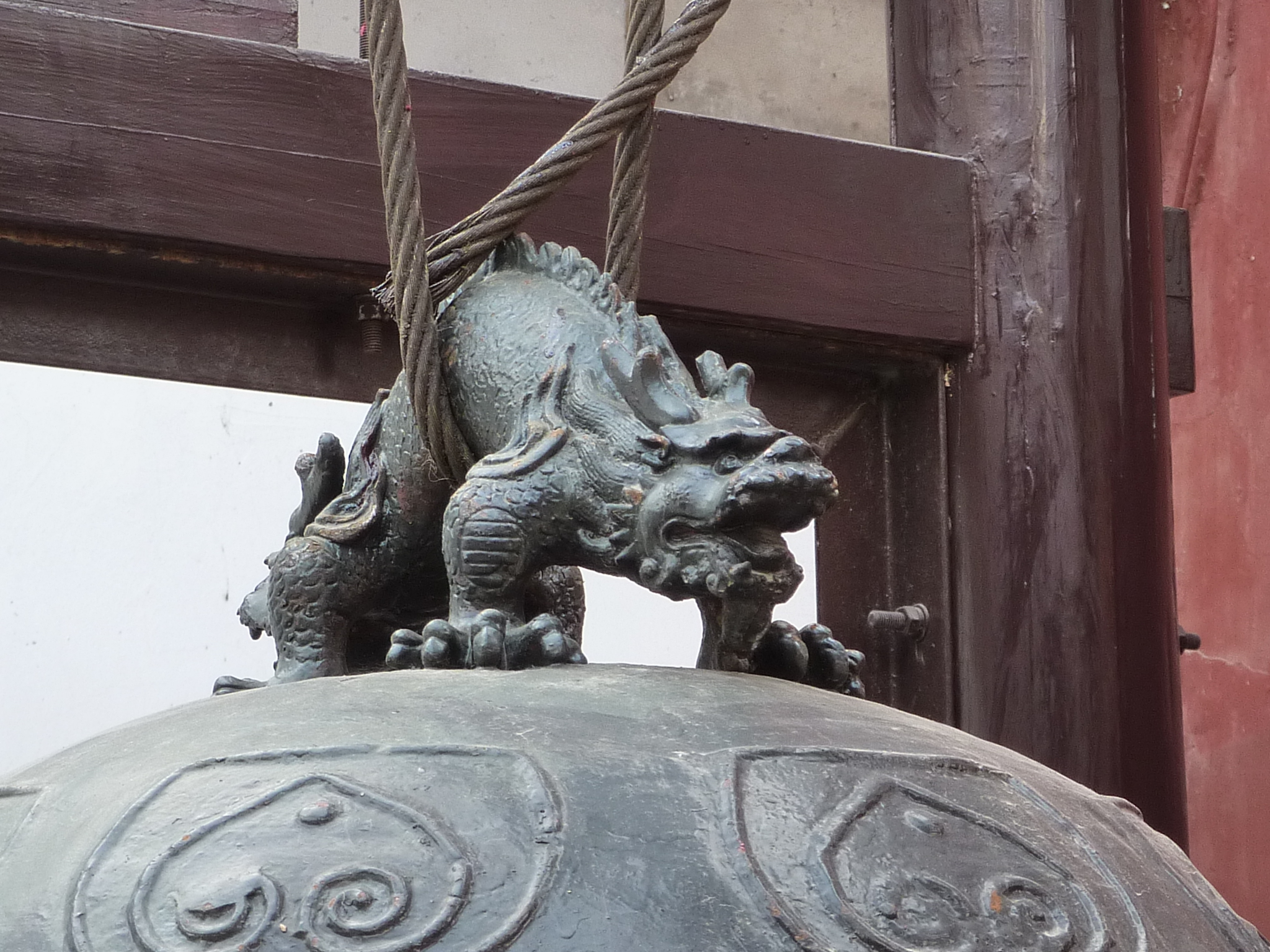
Pulao on a bell in Wudang Palace, Yangzhou

Pulao (Chinese: 蒲牢), known in some early sources also as tulao (徒牢), and Pu Lao, is a Chinese dragon, and one of the nine sons of the dragon. It is said in Chinese mythology that he likes to "roar", and therefore he is traditionally depicted on top of bells in China, and used as the hook by which the bells are hung.

Pulao appeared in Chinese literature already during the Tang dynasty. The Tang dynasty scholar Li Shan (李善, 630–689), in his comments on Ban Gu's (32–92 AD) "Eastern Metropolis Rhapsody" (東都賦, Dong Du Fu), wrote:

海中有大魚曰鯨，海邊又有獸名蒲牢，蒲牢素畏鯨，鯨魚擊蒲牢，輒大鳴。凡終欲令聲大者，故作蒲牢於上，所以撞之者為鯨魚.

In the sea there is a big fish called whale, and on the shore there is a creature whose name is pulao. The pulao has always been afraid of the whale. Whenever the whale strikes [or attacks] him, pulao cries [or roars] loudly. Thus those who want to make a loud [bell] would put a pulao on top. Therefore the bell-striker would be made [in the shape of] a whale.

During the Ming dynasty, the pulao (in the form tulao) appeared in the influential list of fantastic creatures appearing in architecture and applied art, which was compiled by Lu Rong (1436-1494) in his Miscellaneous records from the bean garden (菽園雜記, Shuyuan zaji).

徒牢，其形似龍而小，性吼呌、有神力，故懸於鐘上。

The tulao's form is like that of a dragon, but small. By its nature it likes to roar, and has supernatural strength. [They] used to hang bells [by the tulao].

Later on, the pulao, with similar descriptions, was integrated into various lists of the Nine Children of the Dragon compiled by later Ming dynasty authors such as Li Dongyang and Yang Shen.
