= Shen =

Shen may refer to:

- Shen (Chinese religion) (神), a central word in Chinese philosophy, religion, and traditional Chinese medicine; term for god or spirit
- Shen (clam-monster) (蜃), a shapeshifting Chinese dragon believed to create mirages
- Shenendehowa Central School District, abbreviated as Shen
- Shen ring, an Ancient Egyptian hieroglyphic symbol, a form of cartouche
- Shēn (参) or Three Stars, a Chinese constellation

== Surnames ==
- Shěn (surname), Chinese surname Shen (沈)
- Shēn (surname), Chinese surname Shen (申)
- Shèn (surname), Chinese surname Shen (慎)

== Places ==
- Shen, an ancient place in the Levant (mentioned in 1 Samuel 7:12)
- Shen County (莘县), in Shandong, China
- State of Shen, (申国) Chinese vassal state during the Zhou dynasty
- Shen (申) or Shēnchéng (申城, City of Shen), an alternate name of Shanghai
- Shenyang (沈阳), a city in Liaoning, China

== Entertainment ==
- Shen (character), a character in Ender's Game
- Shén, a fictional race from the world of Tékumel
- Shen, a character from Blade: The Series
- Lord Shen, a character from Kung Fu Panda 2
- Master Shen, a character from Mortal Kombat: Deception
- Tang Shen, a character from the Teenage Mutant Ninja Turtles franchise
- Shen (cartoonist), creator of Shen Comix and Bluechair

== See also ==
- Sheng (disambiguation)
