= Zheng =

Zheng may refer to:

- Zheng (surname), Chinese surname (鄭, 郑, Zhèng)
- Zheng County, former name of Zhengzhou, capital of Henan, China
- Guzheng (箏), a Chinese zither instrument with bridges
- Qin Shi Huang (259 BC – 210 BC), emperor of the Qin dynasty, whose name was Zheng (政)
- Zheng, Chinese name of the star Gamma Serpentis

== Historical regimes ==
- Zheng (state) (806 BC–375 BC), an ancient state in China
- Zheng (619–621), a state controlled by rebel leader Wang Shichong during the Sui–Tang transition
- House of Koxinga (1655–1683), Ming partisans who ruled Taiwan during the early Qing

== See also ==
- Cheng (disambiguation)
- Sheng (disambiguation)
