= Fuzanglong =

Mythical dragon in Chinese mythology

In Chinese mythology, the Fuzanglong (simplified Chinese: 伏藏龙; traditional Chinese: 伏藏龍; pinyin: Fúzánglóng; Wade–Giles: Fu-ts'ang-Lung) is the Chinese dragon of hidden treasures and an underworld dragon which guards buried treasure, both natural and man-made. Volcanoes are said to form when these dragons burst out of the ground to report to heaven. Several tiles and light reliefs depict Fuzanglong dragons serving as mounts to Immortals.

The Fuzanglong possesses a magic pearl which is its most treasured possession.
