= Cheng =

Cheng may refer to:

== Chinese states ==
- Cheng (程; 1046–c. 771 BC), a Han state in Shaanxi under the Western Zhou, possibly identical to Bi
- Cheng (程; c. 771–? BC), a Han state in Henan under the Eastern Zhou, possibly a continuation of Bi
- Chengjia or Cheng (成; AD 25–36), a Han dynasty in Sichuan that briefly vied with the early Eastern Han for control of China
- Cheng-Han or Cheng (成; AD 304–338), a Di state in Sichuan, one of the 16 Kingdoms

== Places ==
- Chengdu, city in Sichuan, abbreviated as Cheng (成)
- Cheng (成) County in Gansu, China
- Cheng or Chengyi (程邑), an ancient city of the Zhou located in what is now Weicheng District, Xianyang, Shaanxi
- Cheng Township in Malacca, Malaysia

== People ==
- Cheng (surname), Chinese surname from various characters, chiefly 程 & 成
- ChEng, an abbreviation for chief engineer

== Other uses ==
- Cheng language, a Mon–Khmer language of southern Laos

== See also ==
- Zheng (disambiguation), various uses written as Cheng in Wade–Giles romanization or Cantonese
- Jing (disambiguation), various uses written as Cheng in Cantonese
- Zhong (disambiguation), various uses written as Cheng in Teochew and Hokkien
- Zhuang (disambiguation), various uses written as Cheng in Teochew and Hokkien
