= Denglong (mythology) =

Chinese mythological creature

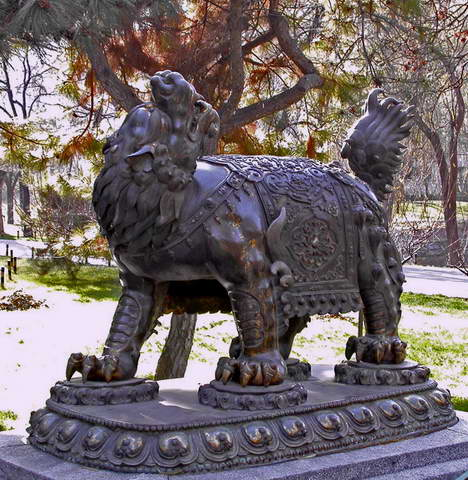
Denglong

The Dēnglóng (traditional Chinese: 蹬龍; simplified Chinese: 蹬龙), or Wàngtiānhǒu (Chinese: 望天吼), Cháotiānhǒu (Chinese: 朝天吼), or simply Hǒu (Chinese: 犼) is a Chinese legendary creature that is sometimes described as a half-dragon and half-dog.

== History ==
Some legends list Denglong as one of the sons of the Dragon King, and it is associated with guardianship.

Denglongs are featured on top of Huabiaos, including one inside of and one outside of Tiananmen Gate. The Denglong inside the gate is named Wangdigui (expecting the emperor to come back soon) and faces North, indicating the emperor should not get distracted by the scenery outside the palace and should instead return to manage the state affairs. The Denglong outside the gate is named Wangdichu (expecting the emperor to go out) and faces South, indicating the emperor should frequently leave the palace to stay aware of public issues.

Some Buddhist legends say that the Denglong is one of the Naga King's sons and is the mount of the Boddhistava Avalokiteśvara, thus the name Chaotianhou.

In Accounts of Marvels (simplified Chinese: 述异记; traditional Chinese: 述異記), it recounts Denglong as a creature from East China Sea, it can eat the brains of dragons, hover in mid-air, and is very fierce. When it is in a fight with a dragon, it spews flames for few dozens of feet, and defeats the dragon. In the 25th year of Kangxi, during the summer, 3 Jiaolong and 2 dragons were sighted fighting one Denglong, and after killing a dragon and two Jiaolong, the Denglong was killed and fell to a valley. It was ten or twenty feet long, resembled a horse, and had scales. After it died, the scales went up in flames, and thus was a Denglong.

== Characteristics ==
The Denglong is said to have ten characteristics that resembles animals: horns like a deer, head like a camel, ears like a cat, eyes like a shrimp, mouth like a donkey, hair like a lion, neck like a snake, belly like a Shen, scales like a koi, front paws like an eagle, and rear paws like a tiger.

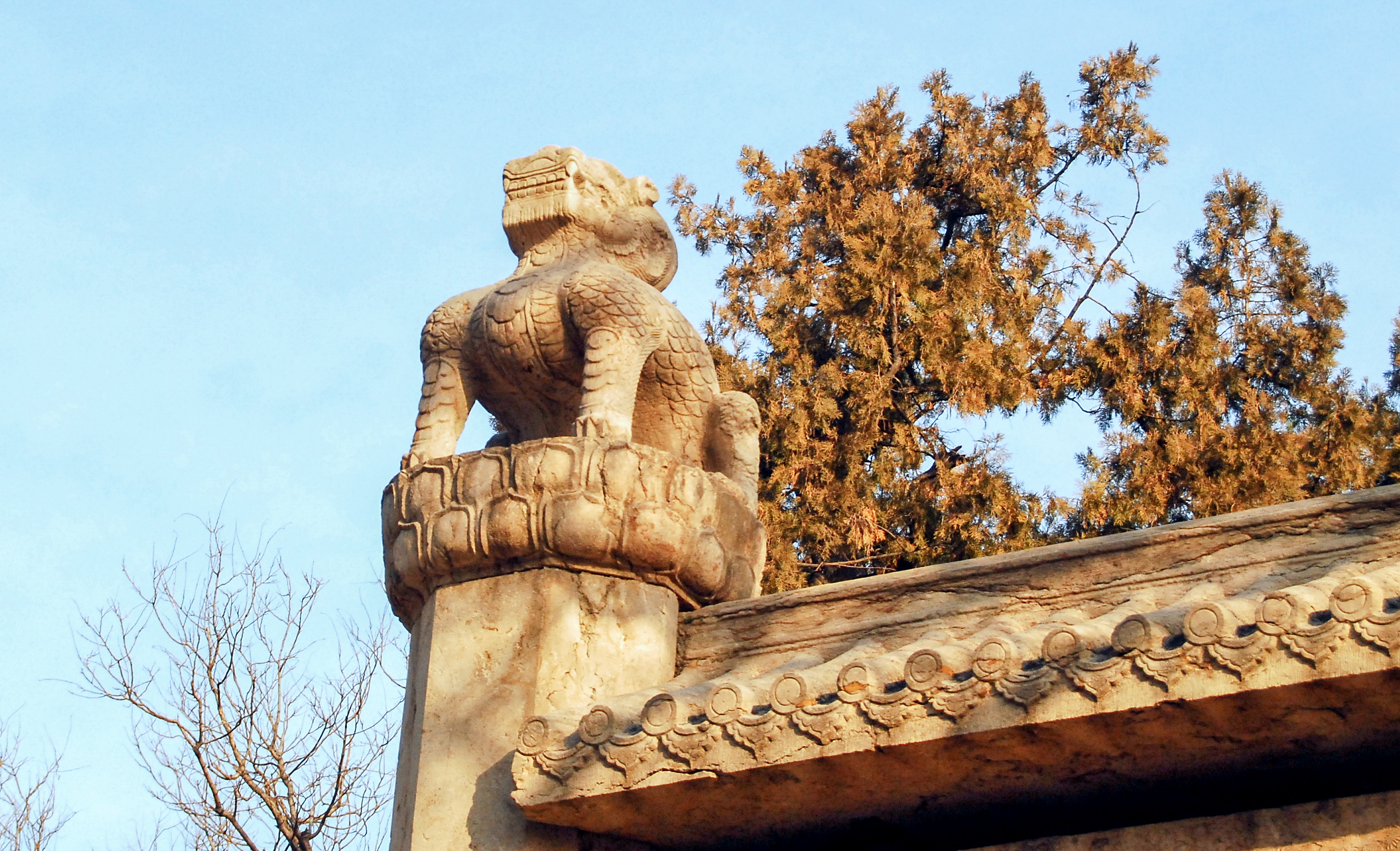
Denglong on a Confucian Temple

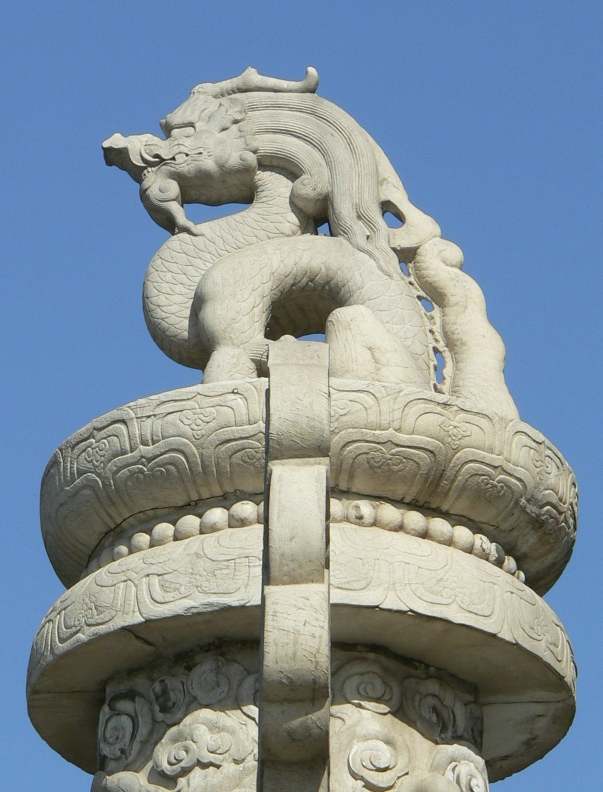
On a huabiao

== Symbolism ==
For status, Denglong resides up on the centre of the universe, where there is two lotuses, right-side-up and upside down, where there are Sumeru with Buddhist prayers beads, thus Denglong is considered the master of all.

For righteousness, Denglong brings celestial phenomena portending peace and prosperity, thus is paid service by many Emperors in history. By having Denglong at their side, Kings can be helped distinguish the righteous and the evil, ensure the country is prosperous, and the kingdom long-lasting. After the Emperor has died, Denglong stays by his side and helps the communication between the living and the dead, helping the Emperor to pass on to another reincarnation. Therefore, Denglong is considered a model for the righteousness and moral.

For function, Denglong is worshiped as a great creature in China because it helps to drive away evil from its master, defend against ill-meaning wishes, takes away bad fortune, gathers and guards money.

The presence of Denglongs on Huabios symbolise sending the will of heaven to humans, and delivering the conditions of the people to the heavens.

== See also ==
- Buraq
- Vahana
