= Zhuang =

Zhuang may refer to:

- Zhuang people (or Bouxcuengh people), ethnic group in China
  - Zhuang languages, the Tai language spoken by them
    - Zhuang logogram, a former script used to write the language
- Zhuang Zhou, ancient Chinese philosopher
- Zhuang (surname) (庄/莊), a Chinese surname
