= Associations of good-doing =

The associations of good-doing (Chinese: 行好的; pinyin: Xínghǎode) are organised groups of the indigenous religion of Hebei province (河北民间宗教; Héběi mínjiān zōngjiào or 河北民间信仰; Héběi mínjiān xìnyǎng), or the "Pear Area" of China. The Congregation of the Dragon's Name (龙牌会; Lóngpái Huì) is one of these movements of good-doers.

Xinghaode associations organise temple festivals and pilgrimages for the worship of certain deities, as well as other types of collective activities. Their purpose is to make rènào (热闹), that is "social living" or "social harmony".

== Etymology ==
The designation of Xínghǎode (行好的), literally "good-doers" or "those who act well", originated with the spread of the Catholic Church in the Pear Area over the last two hundred years. Local Chinese following the native faith adopted the name in contrast with Catholics, who in the area were called Fèngjiàode (奉教的). Catholics nowadays remain less than 3% of the population of the Pear Area.

== Cooperation with local shamans ==
In Hebei folk religion, people who have the ability to mediate with the gods are known as xiāngdàode (香道的), "practitioners of the way of incense", and they cooperate with good-doing groups. The major ritual practice of xiangdaode is provide communities of good-doers with "incense reading" (看香; kànxiāng), "incense watching" (瞧香; qiáoxiāng) or "incense kindling" (打香; dǎxiāng). They are mostly female and are also called by the general terms shénpó (神婆) or xiāngtóu (香頭; "incense heads").

In the Pear Area, one can acquire the ministry of the way of incense either through afflatus (or vocation, 仙根; xiāngēn) or acquisition (ordination from another specialist). Often they claim that they are spiritual disciples (童儿; tónger) of the Four Great Gates, whose specialists operated in Beijing in the 1940s, thus connecting their practice with the shamanism of northeast China.

== Deities ==
The deities (神; shén) of good-doers are divided into two classes:

- generated or natural gods (家神; jiāshén), who are part of nature and produce concrete things. They can be pan-Chinese deities such as Guandi or uniquely local deities such as the goddess of the Nine Lotuses.
- full gods (全神; quánshén), who sustain the cosmos. They are gods of the three planes of the world (heaven, earth and the underworld).

The Horse god (Mǎshén or 马王; Mǎwáng) has a particular importance in the religion of good-doers. Gods that are believed to be particularly powerful are dedicated independent worship halls (仙家堂; xiān jiā táng) or altars (仙家坛; xiān jiā tán), that often start from the house and congregation of popular xiangdaode (shamans).

== See also ==
- Chinese folk religion
- Dongbei folk religion
- Taoism

== Sources ==
- Zhiya Hua. Dragon's Name: A Folk Religion in a Village in South-Central Hebei Province. Shanghai People's Publishing House, 2013. ISBN 7208113297
- Zhiya Hua. Renao (Heat-noise), Deities’ Efficacy, and Temple Festivals in Central and Southern Hebei Province. On: Journal of Cambridge Studies. Volume 8, No. 3-4, 2013.
- Zhiya Hua. Revitalization of Folk Religion in Contemporary China: A Case Study of Dragon Tablet Festival in Central and Southern Hebei Province. Department of Asian and International Studies, University of Hong Kong, 2011.
- Yongyi Yue. Holding Temple Festivals at Home of Doing-gooders: Temple Festivals and Rural Religion in Contemporary China. On: Cambridge Journal of China Studies, Volume 9, No. 1, 2014.
