= Sheng =

Sheng may refer to:

== Chinese culture ==
- Sheng (instrument) (笙), a Chinese wind instrument
- Sheng (surname) (盛), a Chinese surname
- Sheng (Chinese opera), a major role in Chinese opera
- Sheng (volume) (升), ancient Chinese unit of volume, approximately 1 liter
- Sheng pu'er, a type of pu-erh tea
- Provinces of China (省), administrative divisions called shěng in Mandarin

== East African culture ==
- Sheng slang, a slang dialect of the Swahili language

== People ==
- Sheng (artist), a French singer and rapper

== See also ==
- Cheng (disambiguation)
- Zheng (disambiguation)
- Shen (disambiguation)
