= Shen (clam-monster) =

Creature from Chinese mythology

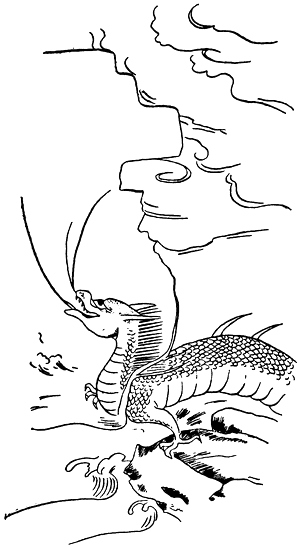
Shen illustrated in Wakan Sansai Zue

In Chinese mythology, the shen or chen (Chinese: 蜃; pinyin: shèn/chèn; Wade–Giles: shen/ch'en; lit. 'large clam') is a shapeshifting dragon or shellfish-type sea monster believed to create mirages.

== Meanings ==
The Chinese character for the shèn

The Chinese classics use the word shèn to mean "a large shellfish" that was associated with funerals and "an aquatic monster" that could change its shape, which was later associated with "mirages".

=== Large shellfish ===
The word used to mean a shellfish, or mollusk, identified as an oyster, mussel, or giant clam such as the Pearl of Lao Tzu. While early Chinese dictionaries treat shèn as a general term for "mollusca", the Erya defines it as a large yáo (珧) "shellfish", "clam", "scallop", or "nacre". The Shuowen Jiezi, an early second-century dictionary of the Eastern Han, defines it a large gé (Chinese: 蛤; pinyin: è (e4), gé, hā, há), meaning "clam", "oyster", "shellfish", or "bivalve".

Chinese classics variously record that shèn was salted as a food (in the Zuo Zhuan), named a "lacquered wine barrel" used in sacrifices to earth spirits (in the Rites of Zhou), and its shells were used to make hoes (in the Huainanzi) and receptacles (in the Zhuangzi). They also record two shèn-compounds related with funerals: shènchē (蜃車, with cart or carriage) "hearse" (Rites of Zhou, Guo Pu's commentary notes shèn means large, shell-like wheel rims) and shèntàn (蜃炭) "oyster-lime; white clay", which was especially used as mortar for mausoleum walls (Zuo Zhuan, Rites of Zhou).

Wolfram Eberhard describes the shèn mussel as "a strange animal", and mentions the Rites of Zhou's zhǎngshèn (掌蜃) "manager of shèn", who was a special government official in charge of acquiring them for royal sacrifices and funerals. "It is not clear why these mussels were placed into the tombs," he admits, possibly either as a sacrifice to the earth god (compare shèn 脤 below) or "the shell lime was used simply for a purifying and protective effect."

Edward H. Schafer, who translates shèn as "clam-monster", traces its linguistic evolution from originally designating a "large bivalve mollusc":

Beginning as an unassuming marine invertebrate, the ch'en was later imagined as a gaping, pearl-producing clam, possibly to be identified with the giant clams of tropical seas, for instance Tridacna. Finally, by early medieval times, it had become a monster lurking in submarine grottoes, and was sometimes endowed with the attributes of a dragon – or, more likely, under Indian influence, a nāga. It expressed its artistic nature by belching up bubbles and frothy clots. These foamy structures were sometimes worked into buildings. …The plastic exhalations of the clam-monster sometimes burst the film of surface tension and appeared to astonished mariners as stunning mansions adrift on the surface of the deep.

=== Aquatic dragon ===
Second, shèn 蜃 meant the "clam-monster" that miraculously transformed shapes. The Shuowen Jiezi defines gé (using a graphic variant with the hé 合 phonetic above the radical) as the "category of shèn", which includes three creatures that transform within the sea. A que 雀 "sparrow" transforms into a gé 蛤 or muli 牡厲 "oyster" in the dialect of Qin, after 1000 (commentators say 10) years; a yān 燕 "swallow" transforms into a hǎigé 海蛤 (with "sea") after 100 years; and a fulei 復絫 or fuyi 服翼 "bat" transforms into a kuígé 魁蛤 after it gets old. These kinds of legendary animal "transformations" (huà 化 "transform, change, convert, turn into; metamorphose; take the form of", see the Huashu) are a common theme in Chinese folklore, particularly for dragons like the shèn. The "dragon's transformations are unlimited", and "it is no wonder that Chinese literature abounds with stories about dragons which had assumed the shape of men, animals, or objects".

The Yuèlíng 月令 "Monthly Commands" chapter of the Book of Rites lists sparrows and pheasants transforming into shellfish during the traditional Chinese lunisolar calendar. In Shuangjiang the last month of autumn, "[jue 爵, a rebus character for que 雀 "sparrow"] Small birds enter the great water and become [gé 蛤] mollusks", and in (Lidong) the first month of winter, "[zhi 雉 "pheasant"] Pheasants enter the great water and become [shen 蜃] large mollusks." While many other classical texts (e.g., Lüshi Chunqiu, Yi Zhoushu, Huainanzi) repeat this seasonal legend about pheasants that transform in dàshui 大水 "great (bodies of) water; flood", the Da Dai Liji and Guoyu say they transform in the Huai River. According to Chinese folklore, swallows are a favorite food of both lóng 龍 and shèn 蜃 dragons. Read explains, "Hence if people eat swallow's flesh they should not go out and cross a river (dragons will eat them if they do)."

Eberhard equates the shàn with the jiaolong 蛟龍 "flood dragon; crocodile" and compares tales of both these dragons attacking cattle in rivers. The 1596 Compendium of Materia Medica describes the shèn under the jiaolong entry with quotes from the Yueling and Lu Dian's Piya.

A kind of crocodile shaped like a huge serpent. Horned like a dragon, with a red mane. Below the middle of the back it has scales inversely arranged. It lives on swallows. It spurts forth clouds of vapour in huge rings. It appears when it is going to rain. The fat and wax is made into candles which have a fragrant smoke noticeable 100 steps away, and ascend in layers in the air. The Yueh-Ling says the pheasant metamorphoses into a Ch'un [sic] when it enters the water. Lu Tien says that serpents and tortoises together produce tortoises but cohabitation of tortoises and pheasants produce Ch'un, although they are different animals they are moved by the same influences. Other records refer to its relationship to the clam.

=== Mirage ===
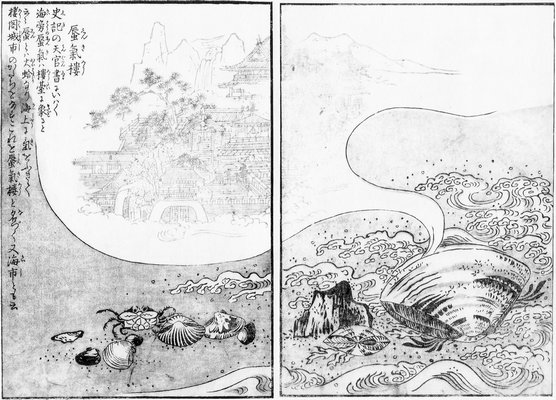
Shinkirō 蜃気楼 "mirage" illustration from the 1781 Konjaku Hyakki Shūi

The shape-changing shèn is believed to cause a mirage or Fata Morgana. Shèn- synonyms meaning "mirage" include shènlóu 蜃樓 (with "multi-storied building", "clam castle" or "high house of the clam-monsters"), shènqì 蜃氣, shènqìlóu 蜃氣樓, hǎishì shènlóu 海市蜃樓, and shènjǐng 蜃景. In Japanese and Korean, shinkirō/singiru 蜃気楼 is the usual word for "mirage". Compare the association between the lóng 龍 "dragon" and "waterspouts", evident in words like lóngjuǎn 龍卷 (lit. "dragon roll") "waterspout" and lóngjuǎnfēng 龍卷風 ("dragon roll wind") "cyclone; tornado"

== Characters ==
Many Chinese characters are phono-semantic compounds, written with a phonetic element that indicates pronunciation with a radical or signifier that suggests semantic meaning. Shen's standard 蜃 and antiquated 蜄 characters combine the character chen 辰 ("Dragon (zodiac), duodecimal 5th of the 12 Earthly Branches; period from 7-9 AM; time period; occasion; star; celestial body") phonetic with the chong 虫 ("insect; reptile") radical.

A variety of other characters utilize this phonetic chen 辰, which the Wenlin says "may have depicted an ancient kind of hoe" in ancient oracle bone script (compare to the same work's definition of nou 耨 "hoe; rake"). Some etymologically significant examples include:

- chen 晨 (with radical 72, 日, "sun") = "dragon star"
- zhen 震 (with radical 173, 雨, "rain") = "thunder; quake" (also a bagua trigram ☳ "The Arousing")
- zhen 振 (with radical 64 扌,"hand") = "shake; stimulate"
- zhen 娠 (with radical 38, 女, "woman") = "pregnant"
- shen 脤 (with radical 130, 肉, "meat") = "sacrificial meat"

This chen 晨 or chenxing 辰星 "dragon star" is an asterism in the traditional Chinese constellations, a morning star within the Azure Dragon that is associated with east and spring. Specifically, the "dragon star" is in the 5th and 6th lunar Twenty-eight mansions, with its xin 心 "Heart" and wei 尾 "Tail" corresponding to the Western constellations of Antares and Scorpius.

== Etymologies ==
Michael Carr etymologically hypothesizes that the chen < *dyən 辰 phonetic series (using Bernhard Karlgren's Old Chinese reconstructions) split between *dyən "dragon" and *tyən "thunder". The former words include aquatic shen < *dyən 蜃 "large shellfish; sea dragon", celestial chen < *dyən 晨 "dragon star", and possibly through dragon-emperor association, chen < *dyən 宸 "imperial palace; mansion". The latter ones, reflecting the belief that dragons cause rainfall and thunder, include zhen < *tyən 震 "thunder; shake", zhen < *tyən 振 "shake; scare", and ting < *d'ieng 霆 "thunderbolt".

Axel Schuessler provides a different set of reconstructions and etymologies:

- shèn, chèn < *dəns 蜃 "'Clam, oyster' … 'some kind of dragon'."
- chén < *dən 辰 "The 5th of the Earthly branches, identified with the dragon … cf. 蜃 'some kind of dragon'", which might be a loan from one of the Austroasiatic languages (proto-Austroasiatic *k-lən "python").
- chén < *dən 晨 or 辰 "Time when life begins to stir: (1) 'early morning' … (2) "start of growing/agricultural season in the 3rd month; heavenly bodies that mark that time' … 'heavenly body', 'time'."
- zhèn < *təns 振 or 震 "('To stir, be stirring':) 'to shake, rouse, quake' … 'to alarm, fear', 'scared', 'thunder', 'move'".
- shēn < təns 娠 "'Pregnant', 'become pregnant' … is derived from 'to shake, rouse, excite' (e.g., a grasshopper from hibernation, i.e., coming to life), hence lit. 'start stirring, moving' (of an embryo)."

== Modern times ==
In the present day, the mythical shèn is best known in East Asia through the everyday words for mirage or illusion (Chinese: 海市蜃樓, pinyin: Hǎishìshènlóu; Japanese: 蜃気楼(しんきろう), Shinkirō; Korean: 蜃氣樓(신기루), RR: Singiru).

One is used by the Second Mizukage (二代目水影, Nidaime Mizukage) in the manga series Naruto. In the light novel Tsukimichi: Moonlit Fantasy, shen, in its onyomi form shin, is the race name of the character Tomoe.
