= Shen Yang =

Shen Yang may refer to:

== Places ==
- Shenyang, city in Liaoning, China

== People ==
- Shen Yang (Eighteen Kingdoms), ruler of Henan of the Eighteen Kingdoms
- Shen Yang (professor) (born 1955), Chinese professor allegedly involved in the sexual abuse of a female student of Peking
- Xiaoshenyang (born 1981), Chinese errenzhuan actorUniversity
- Shenyang (singer) (born 1984), Chinese bass-baritone singer
- Shen Yang (chess player) (born 1989), Chinese female chess player

== See also ==
- Yang Shen
