= Lu Rong =

Chinese scholar (1436–1494)

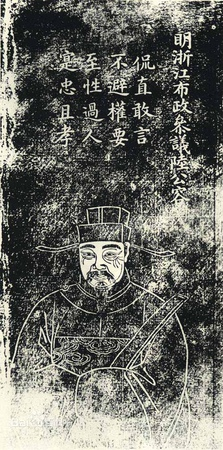

Lu Rong (Chinese: 陆容; pinyin: Lù Róng; 1436–1494) was a Chinese scholar. He is also known under the courtesy name Wenliang (文量) and the pseudonym Shizhai (式斋).

He earned his jinshi degree in 1466. His best-known work is Shuyuan Zaji (椒园杂记), whose title has been translated as Random jottings from bean garden, Miscellaneous notes in the bean garden, or Miscellaneous records from the bean garden.
