= Chien =

Chien may refer to:

- Chien (name)
- Les Chiens, Canadian rock band
- The Dogs (film) or French: Les Chiens, a 1979 French drama film
- Jian (disambiguation), Wade–Giles: chien
- Padre Pedro Chien Municipality or Chien, a municipality in Venezuela
- Qian (disambiguation), Wade–Giles: ch'ien

== See also ==
- Bayou de Chien, Kentucky, United States
- Prairie du Chien, Wisconsin, United States
- Rivière aux Chiens (disambiguation), multiple rivers in Quebec, Canada
- La Chienne, 1931 French film
- La Chienne (story), a short story by Georges de La Fouchardière that was later turned into several films
- Chine, a steep-sided coastal gorge where a river flows to the sea
- Chine (disambiguation)
- L'Autrichienne (disambiguation)
