= Qiang =

Qiang may refer to:

== Culture ==
- Qiang (name), a Chinese name, including a list of people with the name, or an alternate transliteration of Chinese surname Jiang (surname) (彊/强)
- Qiang people, an ethnic group in China
- Qiang (historical people) various non-Chinese groups referred to in Chinese historical literature
- Qiangic languages, a subfamily of the Tibeto-Burman family spoken in Sichuan and Tibet Autonomous Region

== Geography ==
- Qiang la, an Indian transliteration of Changla

== Military ==
- Qiang (spear), a type of Chinese spear

== See also ==
- Qian (disambiguation)
- Jiang (disambiguation)
- Chiang (disambiguation)
