= 乾 =

乾, meaning "clean", "dry", "sky" (in Mandarin) or "northwest" (in Japanese), may refer to:

- Chien Te-men (乾德門; 1943–2018), Taiwanese actor
- Ch'ien Lee (李乾), Chinese-American photographer and botanist
- "Drink Up", a track in the studio album This is MC by Hong Kong singer MC Cheung
- Inui, Japanese surname
- Qian, a county in Xianyang, Shaanxi, China
- Susumu Ohno (大野 乾; 1928–2000), Japanese-American geneticist and evolutionary biologist, and seminal researcher

== See also ==
- Chien (disambiguation)
- "Drink Up", a song recorded by American rock band Train
- Qian (disambiguation)
- Susumu
