= Chien (name) =

Name list

Chien is a romanisation of multiple Chinese surnames and Chinese given names.

== Given name ==
- Chien Lee, (李建) American entrepreneur and sports team owner
- Chien Lee (composer) (李健; 1932–1997), Taiwanese composer and music educator
- Chien Yao (姚謙; born 1961), Taiwanese lyricist

== Surname ==
=== Origins and statistics ===
As a surname, Chien is the Wade–Giles romanisation of a number of surnames spelled Jian in Hanyu Pinyin, as well as a variant spelling of surnames spelled Qian in Pinyin (Ch'ien in Wade Giles):

- Jiǎn (簡; 简), adopted as a surname by some descendants of Xu Juju, who was later named Xu Jianpo (續簡伯).
- Jiǎn (檢; 检), which originated as an occupational surname from jiǎnchá guān (檢察官), a Han dynasty post which could be translated as "Inspector General". Additionally some bearers of this surname changed their surname to the Jiǎn described above, which is homophonous in Mandarin Chinese, though not in other varieties of Chinese.
- Qián (錢; 钱), literally meaning "money", also originated as an occupational surname, said to have been adopted by a holder of the post of treasurer (錢府上士; qiánfǔ shàngshì) during the Zhou dynasty.
- Qiān (千)

Data compiled by Patrick Hanks on the basis of the 2011 United Kingdom census and the Census of Ireland 2011 found 49 people with the surname Chien on the island of Great Britain and none on the island of Ireland. The 1881 United Kingdom census found one person with the surname Chien. The 2010 United States census found 3,756 people with the surname Chien, making it the 8,732nd-most-common name in the country. This represented an increase from 3,239 (9,257th-most-common) in the 2000 Census. In both censuses, more than nine-tenths of the bearers of the surname identified as Asian, and roughly three per cent as non-Hispanic white.

=== People ===
==== Entertainers ====
- Lung Chien (劍龍; 1916–1975), Chinese film director
- Chien Te-men (乾德門; 1943–2018), Taiwanese actor
- Fernando Chien (錢佛南; born 1974), Taiwanese stunt performer
- Jolin Chien (言明澔; born 1986), Taiwanese singer
- Dewi Chien (簡廷芮; born 1992), Taiwanese actress

==== Politicians ====
- Robert Chien (錢純; 1929–2014), Taiwanese economist and politician
- Frederick Chien (錢復; born 1935), Taiwanese diplomat
- Chien Tai-lang (簡太郎; born 1947), Taiwanese politician
- Chien Tung-ming (簡東明; born 1951), Taiwanese politician
- Eugene Chien (簡又新; born 1946), Taiwanese politician and diplomat
- Chien Hsi-chieh (簡錫堦; born 1947), Taiwanese politician
- Chien Chung-liang (錢宗良; fl. 1984–present), Taiwanese politician

==== Scientists ====
- Robert Tienwen Chien (錢天問; 1931–1983), American computer scientist
- Shu Chien (錢煦; born 1931), American physiologist
- Paul Chien (钱锟; born 1947), American biologist
- Alice Chien Chang (錢嘉韻; 1950–2026), Taiwanese molecular biologist and neuroscientist

==== Sportspeople ====
- Chien Kok-ching (錢國楨; fl. 1956), Taiwanese baseball player
- Chien Wei-chuan (錢薇娟; born 1971), Taiwanese basketball player
- Chien Yu-hsiu (簡佑修; born 1980), Taiwanese badminton player
- Chien Yu-chin (簡毓瑾; born 1982), Taiwanese badminton player

==== Other ====
- John C. T. Chien (簡啟聰; 1940–2013), Taiwanese Episcopalian bishop
- Raymond Chien (錢果豐; born 1952), Hong Kong businessman
- Carl Chien (錢國維; born 1964), Taiwanese businessman
- Sansan Chien (簡郁珊; 1967–2011), Taiwanese composer
- Chien Wen-pin (簡文彬; born 1971), Taiwanese conductor
- Colleen V. Chien (錢為德; born 1973), American law professor
- Hank Chien (簡碩宏; born 1974), American plastic surgeon who formerly held a world record score in the video game Donkey Kong
- Chien Shan-hua (錢善華; fl. 1978–present), Taiwanese musicologist
- Alec Chien (簡雅倫; fl. 1982–present), Hong Kong pianist
- Catia Chien (簡嘉慧; fl. 2007–present), Brazilian children's book illustrator
