= Chian =

Chian or Chi-an may refer to:

- An inhabitant of the Greek island of Chios
- A member of the Chian diaspora of people dispersed from the island of Chios
- Qian (disambiguation), various topics also spelled Chian in the Guoyeu Romatzyh romanisation system
- Ji'an (disambiguation), various topics also spelled Chi-an in the Wade–Giles romanisation system
- Li Chi-an (born 1945), North Korean footballer

== See also ==
- Chain (disambiguation)
- China (disambiguation)
- Chiang (disambiguation)
