= National Taiwan Normal University =

National university in Taipei, Taiwan

- 國立臺灣師範大學
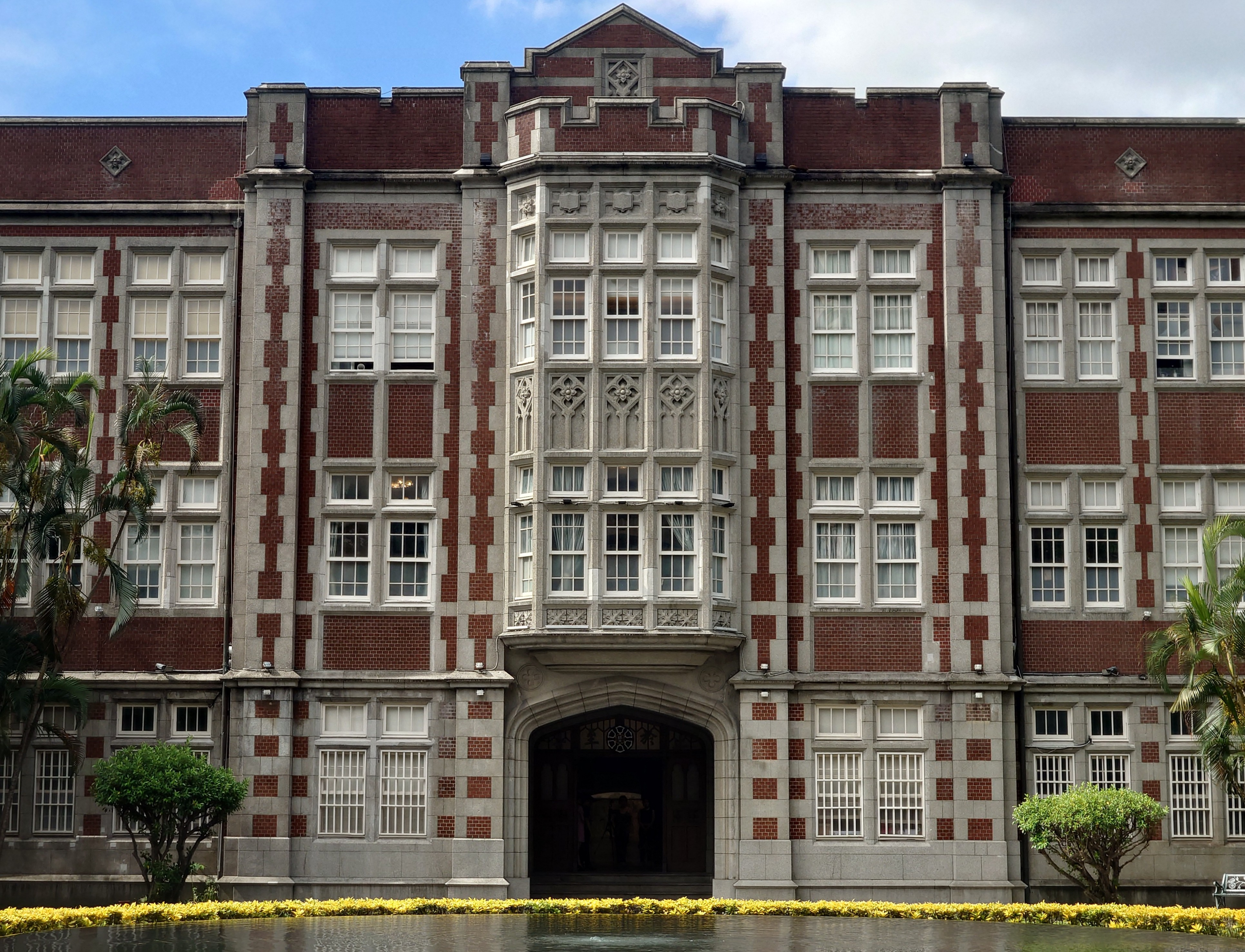
- Former names: Taihoku Higher School (1922–1946); Taiwan Provincial College (1946–1955); Taiwan Provincial Normal University (1955–1967)
- Motto: 誠正勤樸
- Motto in English: Sincerity, Justice, Diligence, and Simplicity
- Type: National public research university
- Established: June 1922 (104 years ago)
- Affiliations: UAAT; ICUE; AAPBS; AACSB; UAiTED
- President: Cheng-Chih Wu
- Faculty: 1,640
- Undergraduates: 8,394 (2025)
- Postgraduates: 7,616 (2025)
- Location: Taipei, Taiwan; 25.0258°N 121.5266°E
- Campus: Urban: Main Campus & Gongguan Campus Rural: Linkou Campus
- Colours: Blue and Red
- Website: www.ntnu.edu.tw

Chinese name
- Simplified Chinese: 国立台湾师范大学
- Traditional Chinese: 國立臺灣師範大學
Transcriptions
Standard Mandarin
- Hanyu Pinyin: Guólì Táiwān Shīfàn Dàxué
- Bopomofo: ㄍㄨㄛˊ ㄌㄧˋ ㄊㄞˊ ㄨㄢ ㄕ ㄈㄢˋ ㄉㄚˋ ㄒㄩㄝˊ
- Wade–Giles: kuo^{2}li^{4} tai^{2}wan^{1} shih^{1}fan^{4} ta^{4} hsüeh^{2}
Southern Min
- Hokkien POJ: Kok-li̍p Tâi-oân Su-hōan Tāi-ha̍k

National Taiwan Normal University (NTNU; Chinese: 國立臺灣師範大學; pinyin: Guólì Táiwān Shīfàn Dàxué) is a national public research university with its main campus in Taipei, Taiwan. Founded in 1922 during Japanese rule as the Taihoku Higher School, (Note: Japanese: 台湾総督府台北高等学校.) it was the first teachers' college in Taiwan.

The university has three campuses across Taipei and New Taipei City. It consists of ten academic colleges, 13 research centers, and 67 academic departments, and operates an affiliated senior high school. As of 2025, it has a total of more than 8,000 undergraduate students and 7,000 graduate students. Over 1,600 students at NTNU are international and over 1,000 students are overseas Chinese in preparatory programs. The university hosts the Mandarin Training Center (MTC), the oldest and largest Chinese-language teaching institution in the country, and administers the Test of Chinese as a Foreign Language (TOCFL), the country's primary Chinese-language examination for non-native speakers.

NTNU is affiliated with National Taiwan University and the National Taiwan University of Science and Technology as part of the National Taiwan University System, formed in 2015. The Research Center for Psychological and Educational Testing (RCPET) at NTNU is responsible for organizing Taiwan's annual Comprehensive Assessment Program for Junior High School Students (CAP). NTNU is also the convening institution for the Committee of College Admission Practical Examination, which is responsible for conducting practical examinations in the fields of fine arts, music, and physical education for use in university admissions across Taiwan.

== History ==
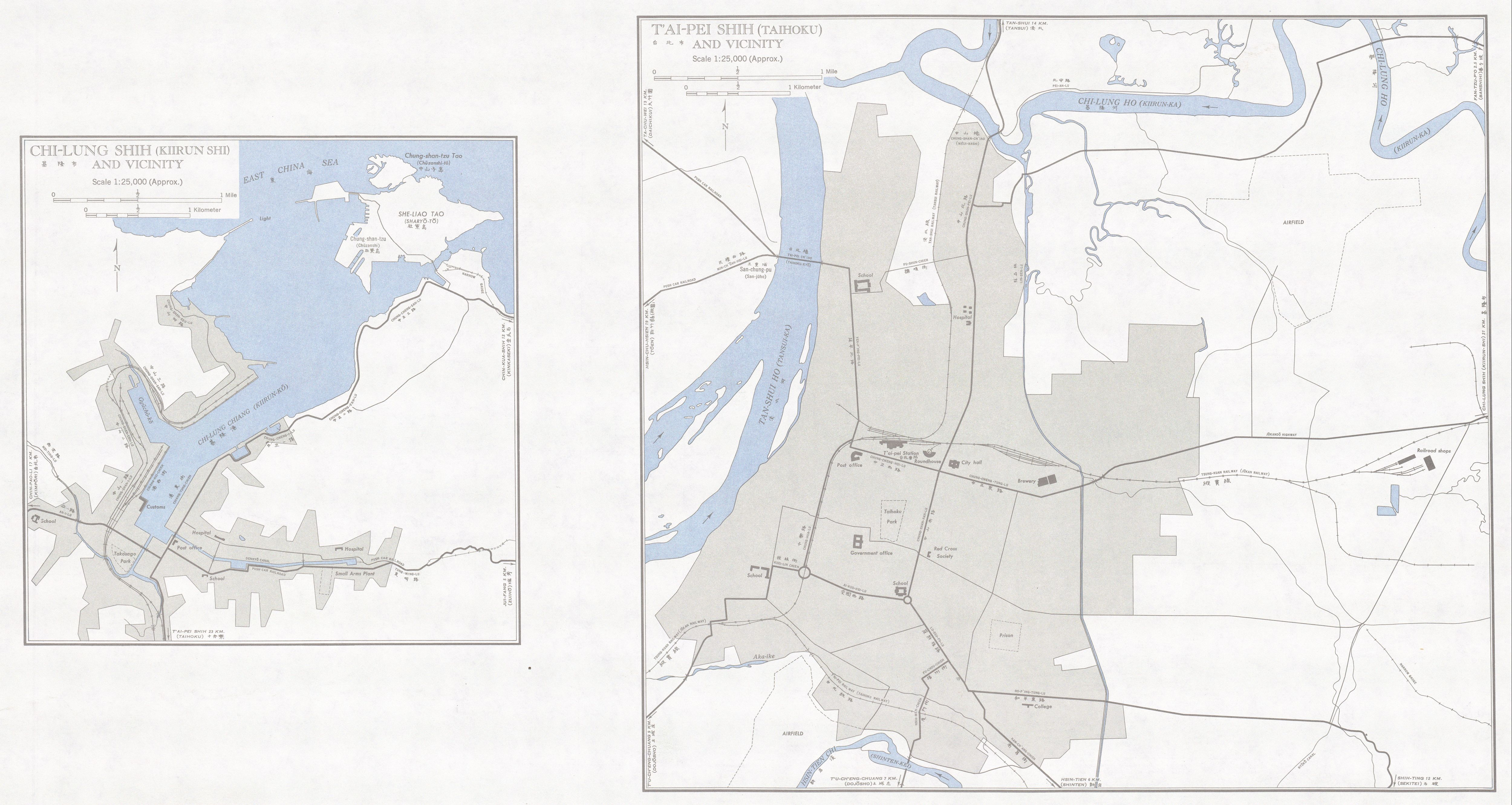
Map including National Taiwan Normal University (labeled as 'College' on HO-P’ING-TUNG-LU 和平東路) (1950s)

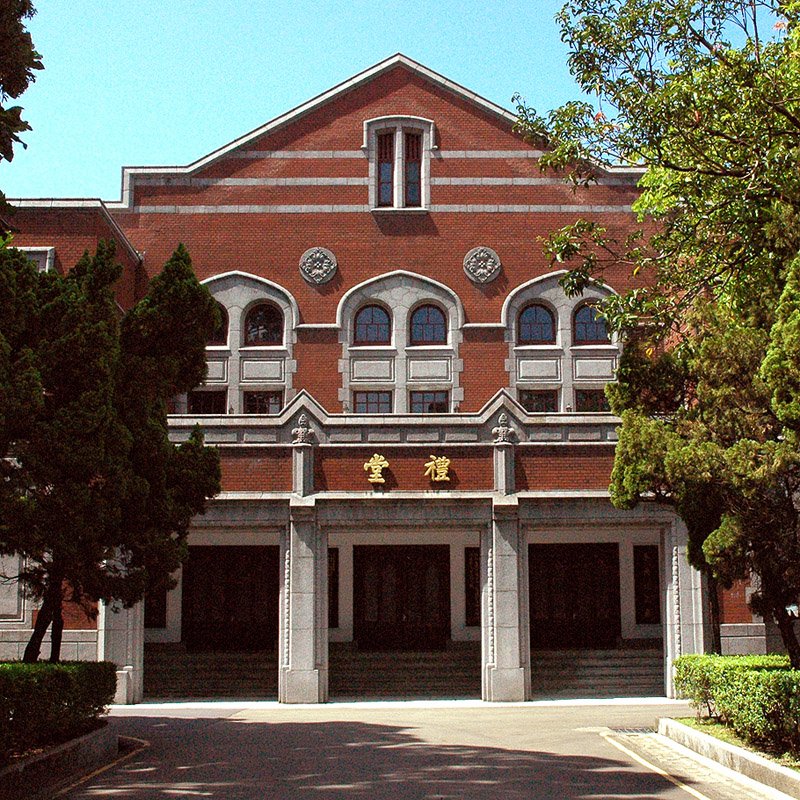
NTNU Lecture Hall

National Taiwan Normal University opened its doors in the early 20th century during Japanese rule in Taiwan. Taiwan's Japanese governors established the school as Taiwan Provincial College. Soon after they gave it the name Taihoku College (Taihoku is "Taipei" in Japanese). The school's purpose was to nurture a native educated class qualified to assist the government in matters of administration. Many buildings on the university's main campus date from the Japanese colonial period, including the Administration Building, the Lecture Hall, Wenhui Hall and Puzi Hall. Japanese architects incorporated features of the Neo-Classical, Gothic and Gothic Revival styles often encountered on European university campuses. A room in the Lecture Hall housed the traditional Japanese document that authorizes and formalizes campus construction.

In the 1940s, the university, along with National Taiwan University, Taiwan Provincial College of Agriculture, and Taiwan Provincial College of Engineering, were the only four higher education institutions in Taiwan.

Some school publications still display 1946 as the institution's founding date in reference to this regime change. A number of Taiwan's leading authors, poets, artists, educators, painters, musicians, linguists, sinologists, philologists, philosophers, and researchers have passed through the university's doors as students and faculty. In 1956 the Mandarin Training Center opened its doors as an extension of the college. The school acquired its present name, National Taiwan Normal University, in 1967. By now the school had established itself as a recognized center of learning in arts, literature and the humanities; its fundamental mission, though, remained the preparation of teachers.

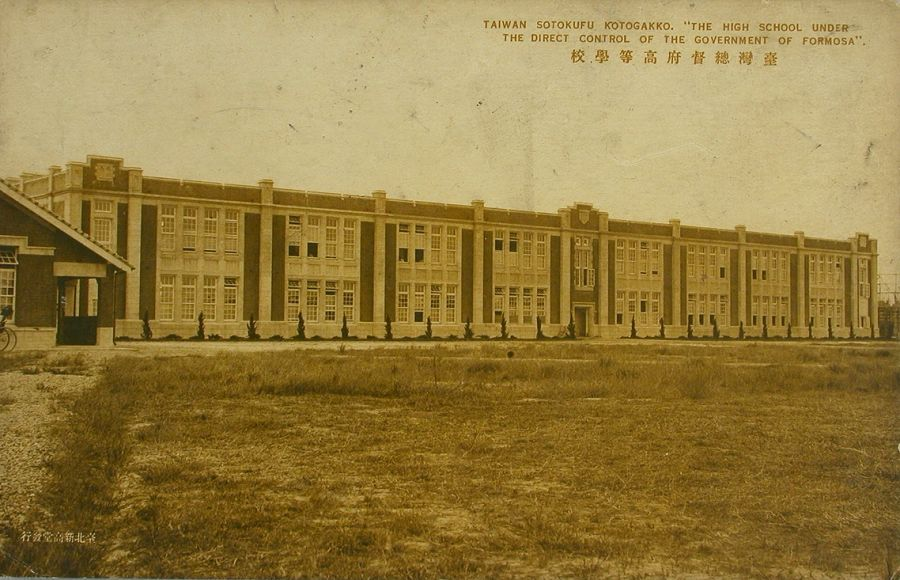
Old Photos of Taihoku High School Buildings

As Taiwanese society made its shift from authoritarian rule to democracy in the 1990s, the university saw its role transformed by passage of the 1994 Teacher Preparation Law. The law gave more schools responsibility for teacher training and set NTNU on its present course as a truly comprehensive university. New departments were created, course offerings and majors were expanded, and new faculty were hired. the merger of NTNU with the University Preparatory School for Overseas Chinese Students in 2006. NTNU is the university in Taiwan with the largest number of foreign students. The university became a hub of international activity, enabling Taiwanese students to travel abroad, attracting international students to Taipei, and building exchange programs with hundreds of sister institutions around the world.

== Campus ==
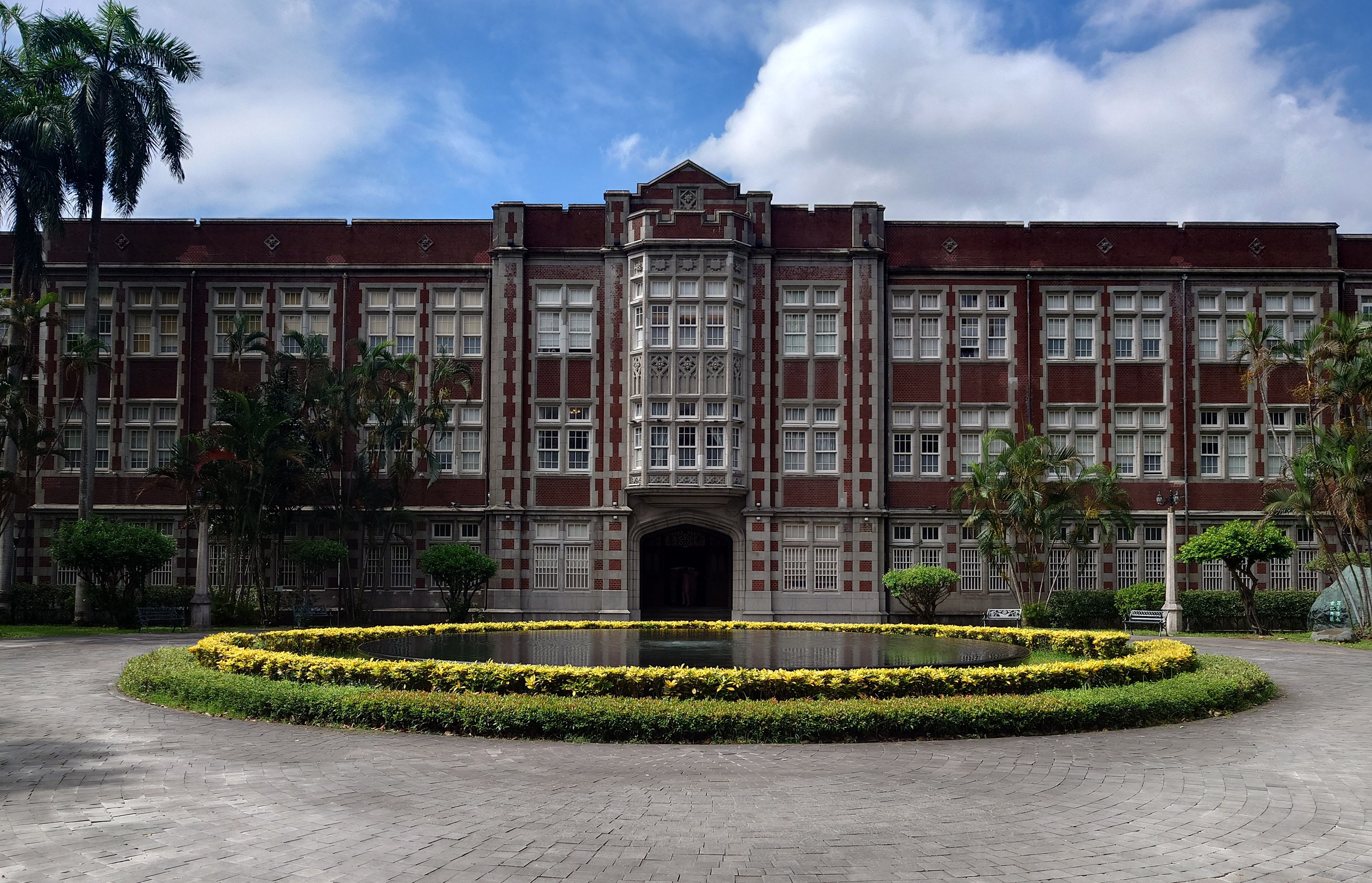
NTNU Administration Building

NTNU's main campus is located in the heart of Taipei, adjacent to the culturally rich and artistic atmosphere of the Yongkang Street Area, and within walking distance are famous attractions such as Daan Forest Park, Chiang Kai-shek Memorial Hall, Taipei Grand Mosque, Mongolian & Tibetan Cultural Center, etc. Universities affiliated with the NTU System, such as National Taiwan University and National Taiwan University of Science and Technology, are also nearby. The university also has campuses in the Wenshan District of Taipei (Gongguan Campus) and in the Linkou District of New Taipei (Linkou Campus), as well as standalone buildings scattered off-campus. Examples include the Yunhe Teaching Building, Qingtian Teaching Building, and the School of Teacher Education Building. Due to the merger with the National University of Preparatory School for Overseas Chinese Students (NUPS), NTNU also inherited some land from the original Luzhou Campus in New Taipei City. It is adjacent to the National Open University.

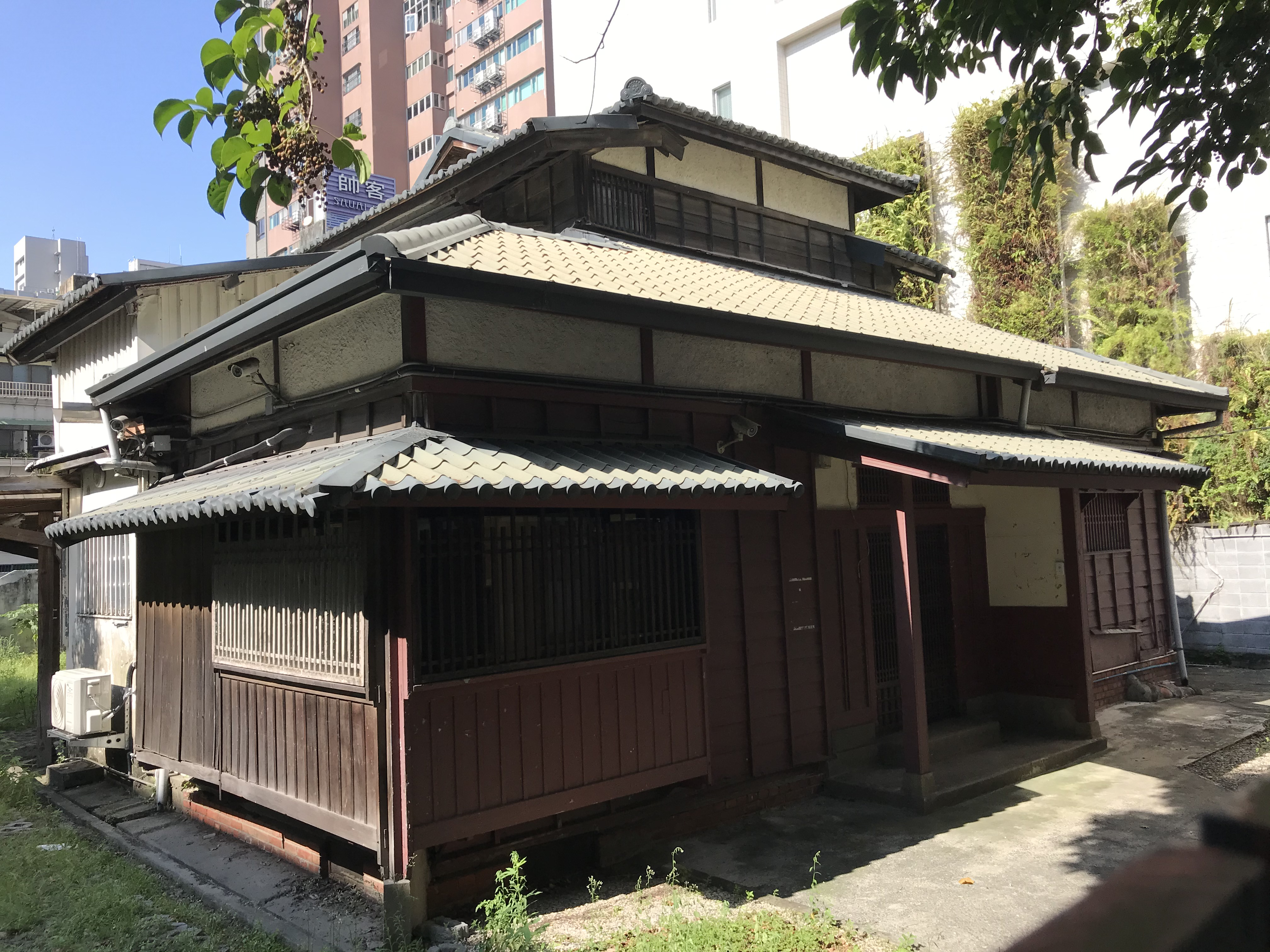
Liu Chen's Residence

The campus is also home to several special sculpture installations, including the "Liberty Bell," which was the spiritual symbol of the Taihoku College, and a Tai Chi statue presented by Peking University in honor of NTNU's promotion of Tai Chi. NTNU obtained the sole license from the Louvre Museum in 1987 and purchased a batch of officially copyrighted original plaster replica statues.

NTNU possesses several Taipei City-designated historic sites, including the Original Buildings of Taihoku High School, the residence of Liu Chen, the residence of Liang Shih-chiu, and more.

NTNU Library has branches on all three campuses. The main library has established the Gao Xingjian Center.

== Culture ==
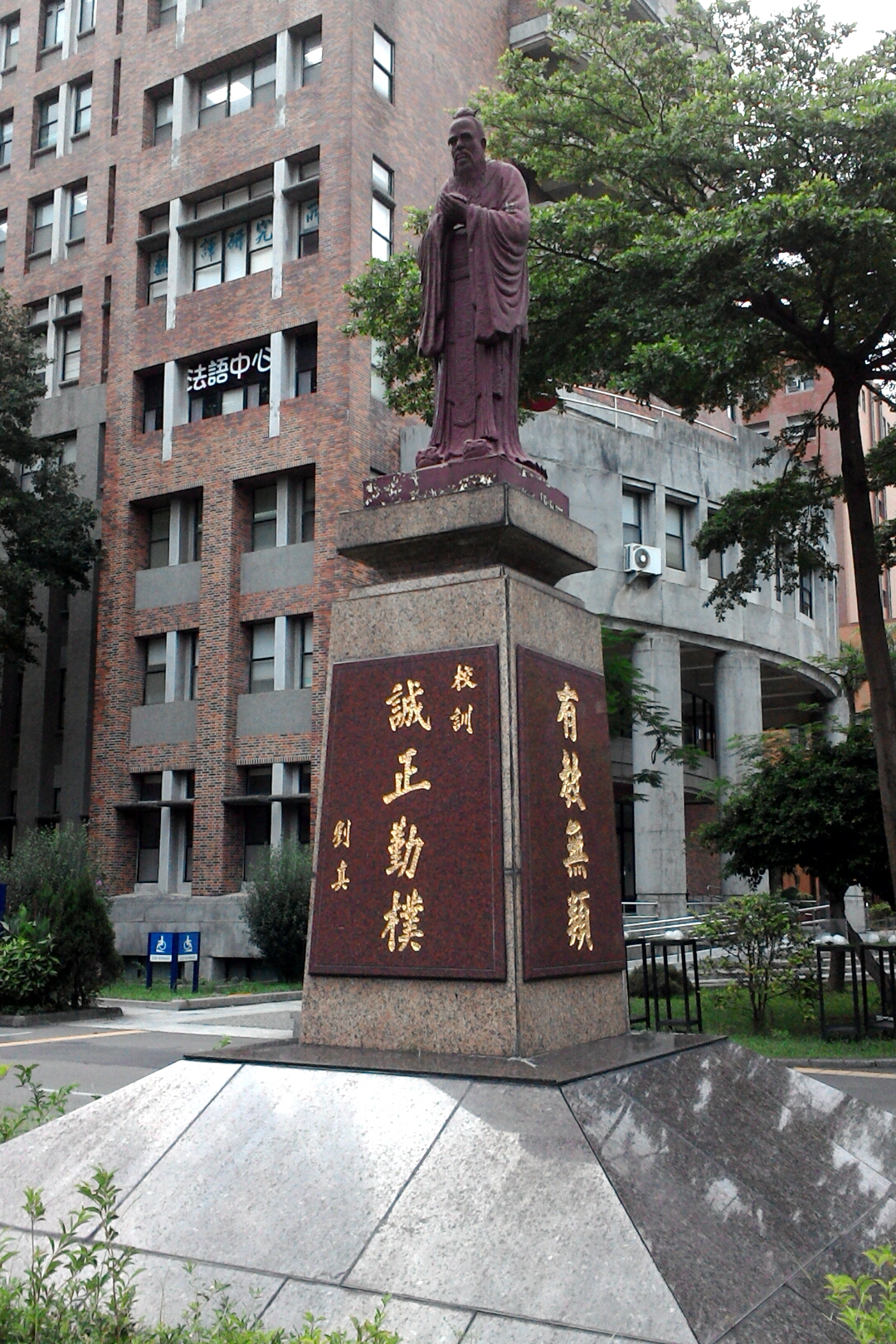
The Confucius statue and school motto at NTNU campus.

The NTNU emblem consists of a circle formed by six wooden bells, symbolizing collective progress and collaborative efforts to achieve "perfection" in education. The colors represent the blue sky and daylight, signifying the fairness and straightforwardness of the educators.

The official school tree of NTNU is the Cassia fistula, chosen because its appearance resembles the traditional teaching whip from ancient times.

Due to the similar pronunciation between the Chinese character "師" (normal) in the school's name and "獅" (lion), the mascot of the school is also a lion named "Da Shi Xiong". In addition to numerous lion-themed memorabilia, the campus features several lion-related sculptures.

== University structure ==
Academic programs at NTNU are administered by 10 colleges: arts, education, international studies & social sciences, liberal arts, management, musicology, science, sports & recreation, technology & engineering and interdisciplinary industry academia innovation.

As of November 2022 the school published the following figures for students enrolled and employees retained.

- Students enrolled: 15,112
- Undergraduate students: 8,394 (944 international students)
- Graduate students: 5,686 (682 international students)
- Overseas Chinese Students in Preparatory Programs: 1,032
- Faculty: 1,541

=== College of Education ===
NTNU's College of Education is the oldest and largest education college in Taiwan. The college collaborates with Tohoku University, Korea University, National Chengchi University, and Nanjing Normal University to offer the Asian Educational Leadership Program (AEL). This course is to nurture internationally minded educational professionals.

- Department of Adult & Continuing Education
- Department of Child and Family Science
- Department of Civic Education and Leadership
- Department of Education
- Department of Educational Psychology and Counseling
- Department of Health Promotion and Health Education
- Department of Special Education
- Graduate Institute of Curriculum and Instruction
- Graduate Institute of Educational Policy and Administration
- Graduate Institute of Rehabilitation Counseling
- In-service Master program of Creativity Development
- Transdisciplinary Program in College of Education

==== School of Learning Informatics ====
- Program of Learning Sciences
- Graduate Institute of Information & Computer Education
- Graduate Institute of Library & Information Studies

=== College of Liberal Arts ===
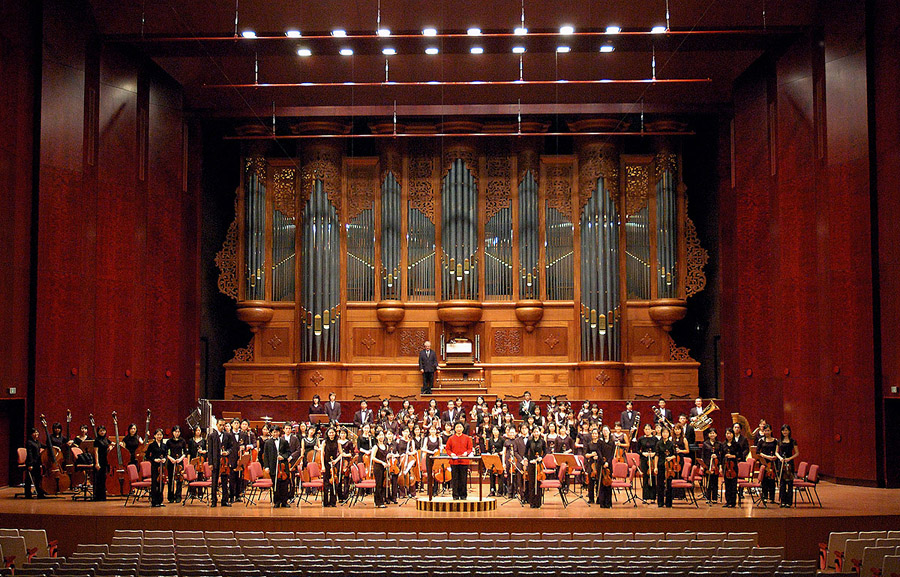
Apo Hsu and the NTNU Symphony Orchestra plays Saint-Saëns's Organ Symphony in Taiwan's National Concert Hall.

- Department of Chinese
- Department of English
- Department of Geography
- Department of History
- Department of Taiwan Culture, Languages and Literature
- Graduate Institute of Taiwan History
- Graduate Institute of Translation and Interpretation

=== College of Science ===
- Department of Chemistry
- Department of Computer Science & Information Engineering
- Department of Earth Sciences
- Department of Mathematics
- Department of Physics
- Graduate Institute of Sustainability Management and Environmental Education
- Graduate Institute of Marine Environmental Science & Technology
- Graduate Institute of Science Education

==== School of Life Science ====
- Department of Life Science
- Undergraduate Program of Nutrition Science
- Graduate Program of Biotechnology and Pharmaceutical Industries
- Graduate Program of Nutrition Science
- Graduate Program of TIGP Biodiversity (Academia Sinica)

=== College of Arts ===
NTNU's College of Arts is the most ancient higher education institution for fine arts in Taiwan, and the birthplace of artistic development in Taiwan.

- Department of Design
- Department of Fine Arts
- Graduate Institute of Art History

=== College of Technology and Engineering ===
- Department of Electrical Engineering
- Department of Graphic Arts and Communications
- Department of Industrial Education
- Department of Mechatronic Engineering
- Department of Technology Application and Human Resource Development
- Graduate Institute of Electro-Optical Engineering
- International Doctoral Program in Integrative STEM Education
- Undergraduate Program of Electro-Optical Engineering
- Undergraduate Program of Vehicle and Energy Engineering

TSMC partners with NTNU to launch semiconductor training program

=== College of Sports and Recreation ===
- Department of Athletic Performance
- Department of Physical Education and Sport Sciences
- Graduate Institute of Sport, Leisure and Hospitality Management

=== College of International Studies and Social Sciences ===
- Department of Chinese as a Second Language
- Department of East Asian Studies
- Graduate Institute of European Cultures and Tourism
- Graduate Institute of International Human Resource Development
- Graduate Institute of Mass Communication
- Graduate Institute of Political Science
- Graduate Institute of Social Work
- Undergraduate Program of Global Studies

=== College of Music ===
NTNU's College of Music is the first higher education institution in Taiwan that specializes in cultivating professional talent in the field of music.

- Bachelor Degree Program of Performing Arts
- Department of Music
- Graduate Institute of Ethnomusicology
- Graduate Institute of Performing Arts

The National Symphony Orchestra was formed in 1986 through the merger of the experimental orchestras from NTNU, National Academy of Arts, and National Taiwan Academy of Arts.

=== College of Management ===
NTNU is the first university in Asia with a teacher training background to receive AACSB accreditation.

- Department of Business Administration
- Executive Master of Business Administration
- Executive Master of Business Administration in Global Fashion
- Graduate Institute of Global Business and Strategy
- Graduate Institute of Management

=== College of Interdisciplinary Industry Academia Innovation ===
- Graduate Institute of AI Interdisciplinary Applied Technology
- Graduate Institute of Green Energy and Sustainable Technology

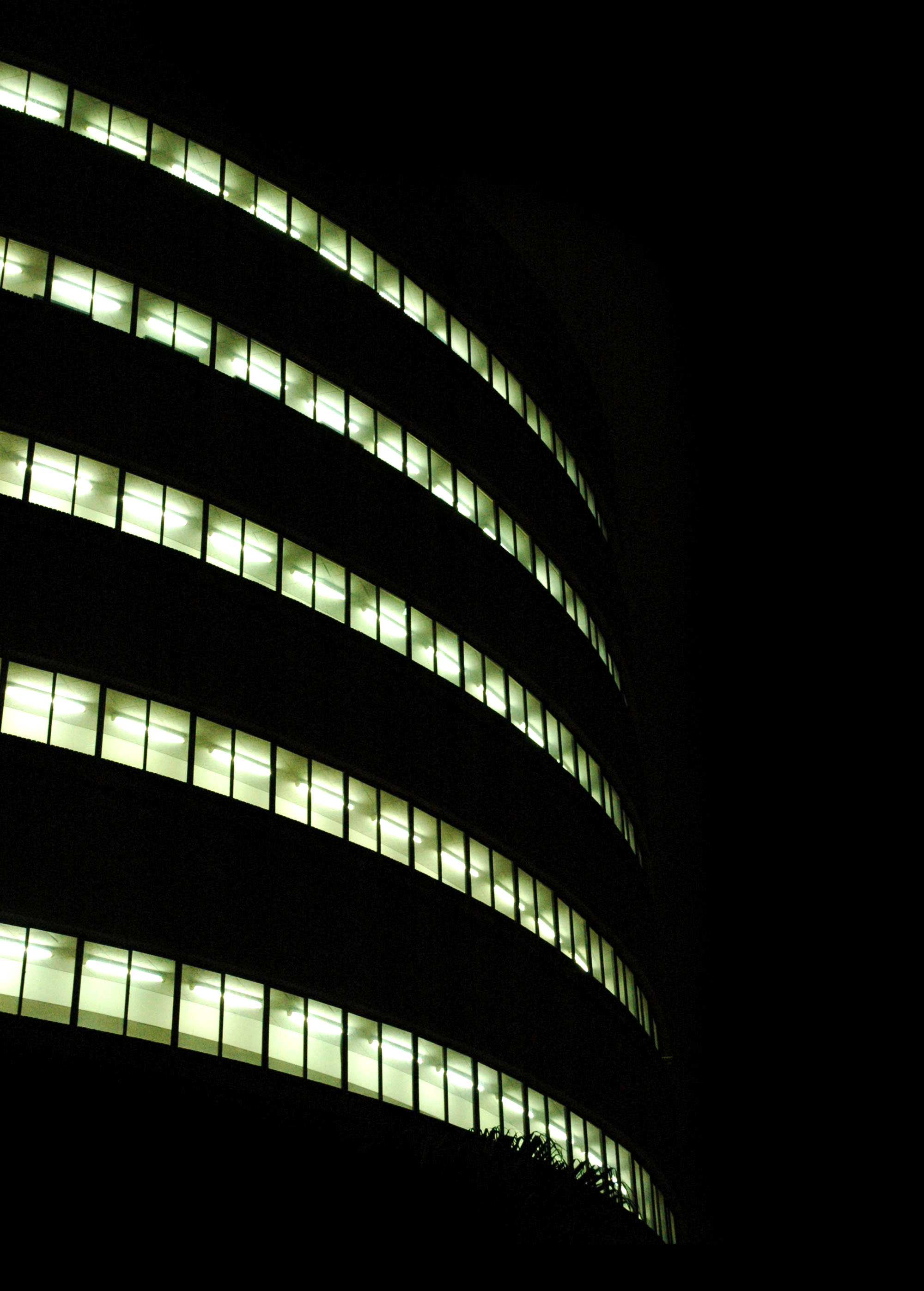
NTNU Main Library (outside at night)

=== Academy of Preparatory Programs for Overseas Chinese Students ===
Its predecessor was the National University of Preparatory School for Overseas Chinese Students, the only educational institution in Taiwan offering overseas Chinese students preparatory courses for university. In 2006, it was merged with NTNU.

=== School of Teacher Education ===
The School of Teacher Education is the primary institution at NTNU responsible for the training of secondary teachers, and it is also responsible for coordinating and integrating relevant resources throughout the university. NTNU was authorized by the International Baccalaureate Organization as the first IB school for teacher's education in Taiwan.

=== Mandarin Training Center ===
Mandarin Training Center (MTC) was founded in 1956 for teaching Chinese as a second language. It's the oldest and largest facility of its kind in terms of courses offered and students enrolled per year. Every year, approximately 3,000 students from around 70 countries come to study at MTC.

=== French Center ===
French Center was founded by NTNU’s former president Mr. Kuo Wei-fan in 1984. The center aims to promote French language teaching, provide a conducive framework for the research of French language teaching in Taiwan, and facilitate cultural exchanges between China and France. The director of the Center manages only the administrative affairs. Teaching affairs, teacher recruitment, placement exams, and other tasks are always overseen by the French nationality of director of the courses.

=== School of Continuing Education ===
In 1996, Extension Division of In-service Education and High School Teacher Research and Study Center were combined and reorganized into Extension Division for In-service and Continuing Education of NTNU. It was restructured again as the School of Continuing Education (SCE) in 2008. The aim is to provide in-service training for teachers and the general public.

=== Research institutes and centres ===
NTNU has a total of 6 university-level research centers, 21 college-level research centers, and 18 department-level research centers. Such as The Chinese Language and Technology Center, Institute for Research Excellence in Learning Sciences (NTNU collaborates with Pennsylvania State University to establish), Social Emotional Education Development Center, and International Taiwan Studies Center, have been granted funding through the Higher Education SPROUT project of the Ministry of Education. The Research Center for Psychological and Educational Testing (RCPET) is responsible for organizing Taiwan's annual Comprehensive Assessment Program for Junior High School Students (CAP). NTNU is also the convening institution for the Committee of College Admission Practical Examination. The Programme for International Student Assessment (PISA) in Taiwan is also overseen by this university. The Non-formal Education Programs Accreditation Center is responsible for accrediting the credits of community colleges across Taiwan. NTNU is also responsible for the examination and certification of Formosan languages and Hakka languages in Taiwan.

NTNU and the Ministry of Culture jointly set up the Taiwan-France Foundation for Culture and Education.

NTNU has established a joint laboratory with US-based Haskins Laboratories. NTNU hosts the Asia Pacific Regional Center (APRC) for the Global Environmental Education Partnership (GEEP). The Taiwan Studies Program between the UCLA and NTNU was established in 2017. Its aim is to create academic synergies and promote cutting-edge research in the field of Taiwan Studies. NTNU joined forces with NVIDIA and GIGABYTE, to jointly create "Meta-Universe Motion Capture Laboratory" and collaboration space.

NTNU is the only university member state to join the “Infrared and Raman Users Group” (IRUG) in Taiwan.

=== Affiliated school ===
The university also runs the Affiliated Senior High School of National Taiwan Normal University, a daughter institution for secondary-school students in Taiwan.

TCS Experimental Education institution is set up in NTNU's Lingkou Campus, and graduates are awarded diplomas from Taiwan and BC, Canada.

=== University alliances ===
NTNU is affiliated with National Taiwan University and National Taiwan University of Science and Technology as part of the National Taiwan University System (NTUS).

NTNU is a member of University Academic Alliance in Taiwan (UAAT). The members include twelve universities such as National Taiwan University, National Cheng Kung University, National Tsing Hua University, National Yang Ming Chiao Tung University, National Sun Yat-sen University, National Chengchi University, and National Taiwan University of Science and Technology.

NTNU is a founding member of University Alliance in Talent Education Development (UAiTED), Taiwan-UK University Consortium, International Consortium for Universities of Education in East Asia (ICUE), Taiwan Education Alliance, Taiwan University Alliance for Sustainable Governance, Presidents' Forum of Southeast Asia and Taiwan Universities (SATU Presidents' Forum), and Association of Asia-Pacific Business Schools (AAPBS).

== International relations ==
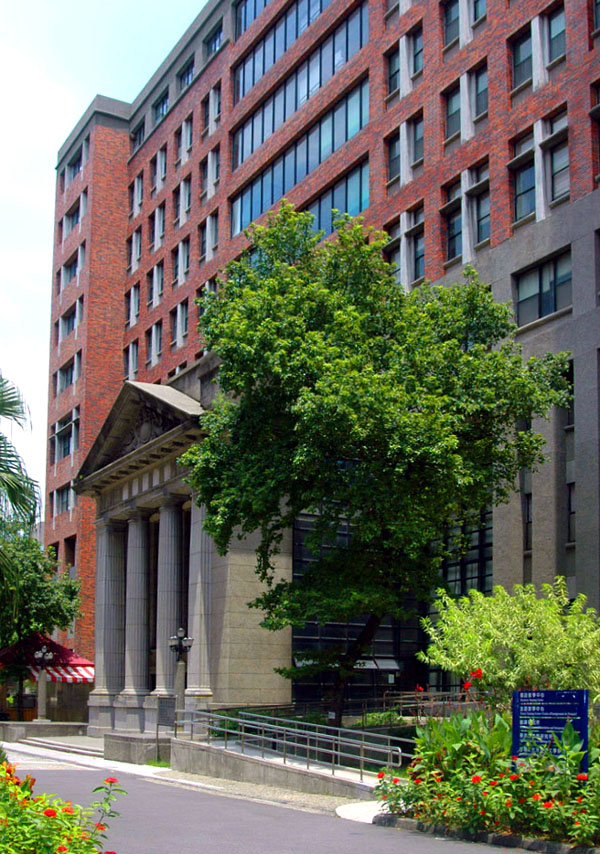
The NTNU Language Studies Building houses the Mandarin Training Center

NTNU has established strategic pationships with The University of Texas at Austin, Purdue University, The University of British Columbia, The University of Queensland, Kuushu University, Osaka University, Hanyang University, University of Glasgow, University of Bordeaux and Goethe University Frankfurt. NTNU also has a long cooperative relationship with Pennsylvania State University, dating back to 1953. At that time, NTNU received support from USAID with the assistance of Pennsylvania State University.

Mandarin Chinese Training

NTNU is best known for its Mandarin Training Center (formerly known as the Center for Chinese Language and Cultural Studies), a program founded in 1956 for the study of Mandarin Chinese to foreign students. The Mandarin Training Center represents one of the world's oldest and most distinguished programs for language study, attracting more than a thousand students from over sixty countries to Taiwan each year and making the Shida area of Taipei one of the city's most cosmopolitan. Courses in language, literature, calligraphy, art and martial arts are offered in a series of three-month terms throughout the year, enabling international students to undertake language studies during summer breaks and within single semesters. The center also sponsors travel, hosts speech contests, and stages workshops and performances for a variety of East Asian arts. A Mandarin Training Center Alumni Association (MTCAA) has been operating since 1998.

The Test of Chinese as a Foreign Language (TOCFL) is administered by the Steering Committee for the Test Of Proficiency-Huayu (SC-TOP) at NTNU. NTNU signed the Taiwan Huayu BEST Program partnership with Pennsylvania State University, University of California, Santa Barbara, University of California, Los Angeles, University of Maryland, Purdue University, University of Guam and SOAS University of London.

International Cooperation and Programs

NTNU signed the Memorandum of Cooperation with the Reorienting Education towards Sustainability of UNESCO in 2018. In 2020, NTNU joined a new-launched network named the International Network of Teacher Education Institutions (INTEI) and a new ESD for 2030 Framework.

NTNU has organized International Science Olympiads in various fields, including Informatics, Earth Science, Biology, and Chemistry. The International Chemistry Olympiad will be hosted by NTNU again in 2027.

Fulbright Taiwan logo

NTNU also participates in the Biodiversity Program of the Taiwan International Graduate Program of Academia Sinica. NTNU (National Taiwan Normal University) also collaborates with the Fulbright Program, providing opportunities for American students to pursue master's and doctoral studies in Taiwan.

A MTC teaching building and new international dormitory for NTNU international students is slated to open in 2027. The building is located in downtown Taipei's Daan District. At the beginning of the development of NTNU, some of the buildings were built with loans from the World Bank's Education program.

The Menahil Promise, jointly promoted by NTNU and Tzu Chi Foundation, provides assistance to Syrian refugees. After the Myanmar earthquake in 2025, NTNU also immediately provided assistance to the families of affected students.

== Ranking and reputation ==
University rankings

Global – Overall
- QS World: 435 (2026)
- RUR World: 459 (2024)
- THE World: 501–600 (2024)
- USNWR Global: 930 (2025)

Regional – Overall
- QS Asia: 79 (2025)
- THE Asia: 118 (2025)

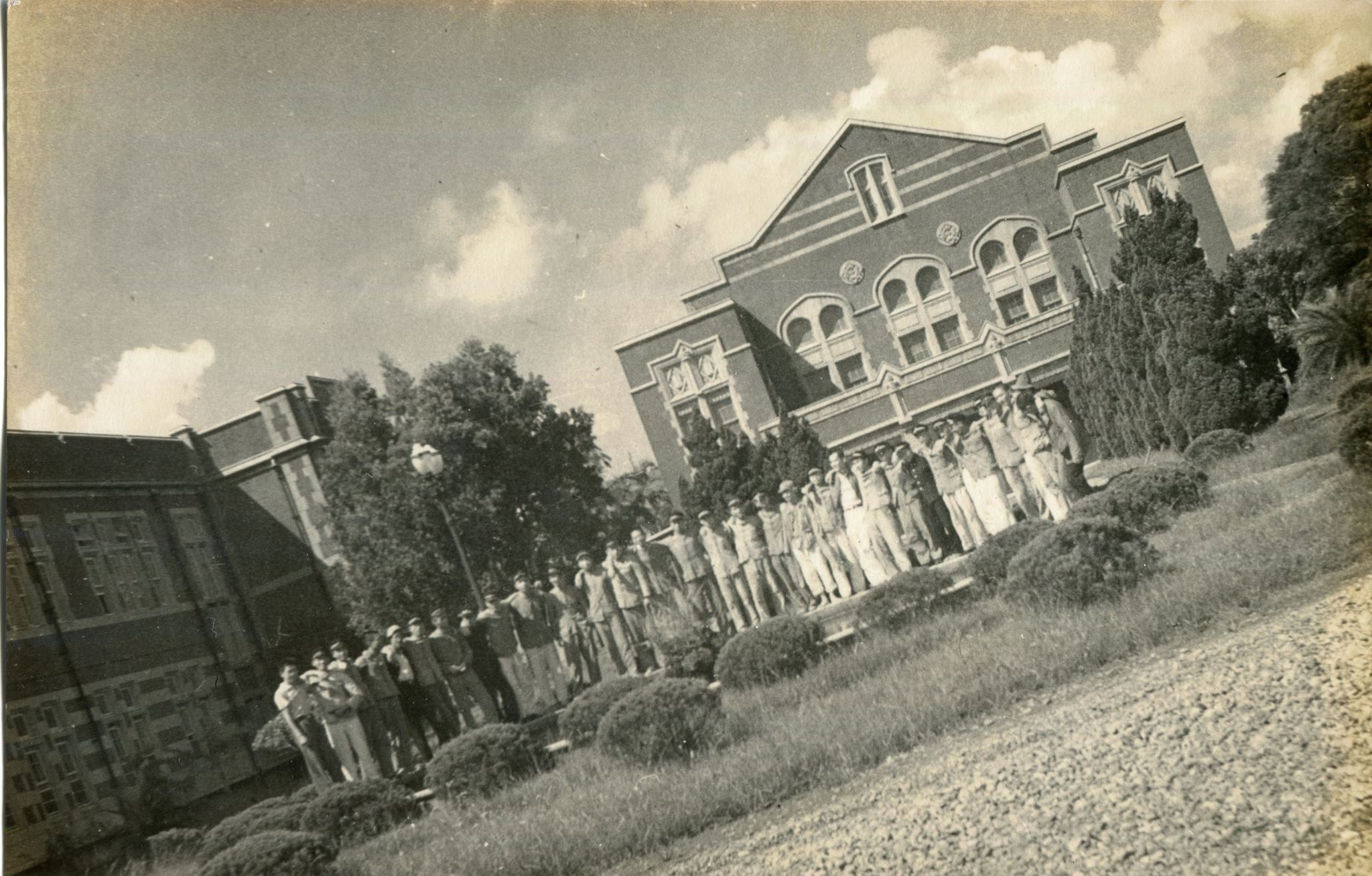
Students of Taihoku High School at the campus

The predecessor of NTNU was the Taihoku Higher School under the Government-General of Taiwan (Taihoku Higher School). The school served as the sole pathway for Taiwanese students during the Japanese colonial era to enter universities for further studies. In the 1940s, this university was also one of the only four higher education institutions in Taiwan Province. As a result, admission competition was extremely intense.

NTNU has long been recognized as one of Taiwan’s elite institutions of higher education, especially in the field of humanities and social sciences. NTNU is also the best university within Taiwan's normal university system. While Taiwan has other normal and education universities, this is the only university commonly referred to as "Shi Dà” (師大, normal university). Its affiliated high school is also known as “Shi Dà Fù Zhōng" (師大附中, HSNU).

Due to NTNU's excellent development in language education and internationalization, it has been chosen by the Ministry of Education as one of Taiwan's four landmark bilingual universities.

=== Subject Rankings ===
- U.S. News & World Report Best Global Universities subject rankings:

Education and Educational Research: 9th (Asia's second)

- Times Higher Education World University Rankings by subject:

Education: 15 (Asia's second)

- QS World University Rankings by Subject:

Education & Training: 24

Linguistics: 90

Modern Languages: 93

Library & Information Management: 51-100

Classics & Ancient History: 51-100

Petroleum Engineering: 51-100

Sports-Related Subjects: 101-150

English Language & Literature: 151-200

Sociology: 151-200

Arts & Humanities: 207

Psychology: 201-250

The number of disciplines at NTNU that have entered the global top 100 ranks second in Taiwan.

- Academic Ranking of World Universities (ARWU) of Academic Subjects:

Education: 39 (Asia's third)

- Global Views Monthly Taiwan's Best University Rankings:

Universities focusing on humanities and social sciences: 1st

=== Sustainable development ===
NTNU is the second institution in Asia to receive the Gold rating in the Sustainability Tracking, Assessment & Rating System (STARS), established by the Association for the Advancement of Sustainability in Higher Education (AASHE). According to QS World University Rankings (Sustainability 2023), NTNU is ranked 3rd in Taiwan and around 50th globally in Sustainable Institutions and 100th in education influence.

NTNU serves as an important consulting and project implementation institution for the Environmental Protection Administration, the Forestry Bureau, and the Ministry of Education in promoting environmental education, sustainable development, and sustainable development goals.His Highness Sheikh Abdul Aziz Al Nuaimi of Ajman (Green Sheikh), United Arab Emirates, visited NTNU on 2025. NTNU also collaborated with Prudential to publish the White Paper on Climate Change and Health Adaptation.

NTNU aims to "reduce carbon emissions by 50% by 2030 and achieve complete carbon neutrality by 2050" through net-zero green life, energy efficiency, low carbon emission electricity (kgco2e), and green energy.

== Alumni ==
The NTNU Alumni Association was founded in 1950 as the Graduate Guidance Committee. It was officially renamed the NTNU Alumni Center in 2020. Its stated mission is "Connect with alumni, converge the alumni and the university, and contribute more resources to support the sustainable development of the university."

Currently, NTNU has 12 alumni chapters across various counties and cities in Taiwan. Internationally, there are 21 alumni chapters located in North America (such as Washington, California, Texas, New England, the East Coast, the Midwest, Eastern Canada, and British Columbia), Hong Kong, Macau, mainland China, Japan, South Korea, Singapore, Malaysia, Indonesia, and other regions. Additionally, each college and department has its own alumni association.

=== Notable faculty ===
- Apo Hsu (Hsu Ching-Hsin 許瀞心) – conductor
- Chen Daqi – a polymath, politician and pioneer of modern psychology in China
- Chen Houei-kuen – painter
- Cornelius C. (Neil) Kubler – American professor and scholar of Mandarin, Taiwanese and other dialects of Chinese; former U.S. diplomat (alumni)
- Kuo-En Chang – a computer education scholar, 13th president of NTNU
- Howard S.H. Shyr – a law scholar and politician
- Hu Qiuyuan – an author, educator and politician.
- Huang Hsiu-meng – member of the Legislative Yuan
- Lee Shih-chiao – painter
- Lee Tze-fan – painter
- Liang Shih-chiu – the first Chinese scholar to single-handedly translate the complete works of Shakespeare into Chinese
- Li Meishu – Zushi Temple designer
- Lin Yu-shan – painter
- Lo, Kii-Ming – musicologist
- Mou Zongsan – Chinese New Confucian philosopher
- Puru – artist, calligrapher, and member of the Qing dynasty ruling Aisin Gioro family and grandson of the Daoguang Emperor
- Shan-Hua Chien – musicologist
- Su Xuelin – Chinese author and writer
- Tyzen Hsiao – composer of the neo-Romantic school
- Wen-Pin Hope Lee – Taiwanese Golden Melody Award-winning composer
- Xie Bingying – a female soldier and writer born in Loudi, Hunan
- Yeh Shin-cheng – an environment scholar and politician
- Yu-xiu Chen – pianist and music scholar, the former chairman of Taiwan Broadcasting System, and former chairperson of Council for Cultural Affairs
- Yu Guangzhong – a writer, poet, educator, and critic
- Yeh, Nai‐Chang – Taiwanese-American physicist
- Leo Ou-Fan Lee – commentator and author
- William Shi-Yuan Wang – linguist
- Shi Shuqing – writer and educator
- Ovid Tzeng – linguist and psychologist, the former Minister of Education and Minister of the Council for Cultural Affairs
- Wu Ching-ji – educationalist, the former Minister of Education
- Kuo Wei-fan – educationalist, the former Minister of Education and Minister of the Council for Cultural Affairs
- Sheu Tian-ming - Dean of the College of Education

=== Mandarin Training Center alumni ===
- Richard Bernstein – American journalist
- March Fong Eu – American politician
- Andrew Fastow – former CFO of Enron
- Howard Goldblatt – American literary translator
- Imre Hamar – Hungarian scholar of Chinese studies
- Ryutaro Hashimoto – former Prime Minister of Japan
- Jon Huntsman Jr. – former United States Ambassador to Singapore from 1992 to 1993, and China from 2009 to 2011; current U.S. Ambassador to Russia
- Koichi Kato – former government minister of Japan
- Pierre Ryckmans – Belgian-Australian writer, essayist and sinologist
- Kevin Rudd – former Prime Minister of Australia
- Chie Tanaka – Japanese model and actress
- Richard Vuylsteke – President of the American Chamber of Commerce in Hong Kong
- Stephen H. West – American sinologist
- Albert E. Dien – Emeritus professor at Stanford University
- Tsai Ming-liang – Malaysian filmmaker based in Taiwan

=== Honorary degree ===
- Jack Ma Yun – the co-founder of Alibaba Group
- Gao Xingjian – the Nobel Prize in Literature laureate of 2002
- Liao Shiou Ping – Father of Modern PrintMaking in Taiwan
- Liu Chen – Taiwanese educator, the former president of NTNU

== Controversies ==
=== Unethical research ===
Coach Chou Tai-ying (周台英) of the women’s soccer team at NTNU allegedly forced players to provide blood samples for a National Science and Technology Council research project, threatening them with the loss of academic credits or even academic status if they refused. In addition, some of the blood samples were reportedly collected by non-medical staff in a previous research project. As the Ministry of Health and Welfare had previously issued an interpretation permitting such actions, this also prompted the ministry to commit to revising the relevant provisions. The Ministry of Education has recommended a two-year dismissal for the coach and stated it will closely monitor NTNU’s handling of the incident. The university’s student association also condemned the incident and urged the school to protect the rights of student athletes. In response, the university revised the guidelines for conducting research involving student athletes and became the first non-medical university in Taiwan to establish a Human Research Protection Center. The incident also extended to National Taiwan University, National Central University, University of Taipei, and Chang Gung Memorial Hospital.

== See also ==
- Affiliated Senior High School of National Taiwan Normal University
- Mandarin Training Center
