= Gongsun Jie =

6th-century B.C. Chinese warrior

Gongsun Jie (Chinese: 公孙捷), surname Jiang, name Jie, was a warrior during the Spring and Autumn period in Chinese history.

In July 534 BC, the governing Gao Gao (Ziwei) died, and Luan Shi (Ziqi) wanted to manage the Gao's family property. Gongzi Zhu), Ziche (Gongsun Jie), three people fled to Lu. Luan Shihou established the housekeeper for Gao Qiang's son Gao Qiang (Zi Liang).

In 532 BC, Tian Wuyu and Bao Guo defeated Luan Shi and Gao Qiang. Luan Shi and Gao Qiang went to Lu Guo. Qi Guo welcomed Huicheng, Zi Gong and Zi Che.

In 516 BC, Lu Zhaogong was expelled by Ji Sunyiru, and Qi State wanted to accept it and besieged the city of Meng Sun of Lu State. Qilu was fighting in the nose and Zi Yuanjie participated in the battle. One said, the grandson in the story of Ertao killing three soldiers is Zi Yuanjie.
