= Jiāng (surname 江) =

Chinese family name

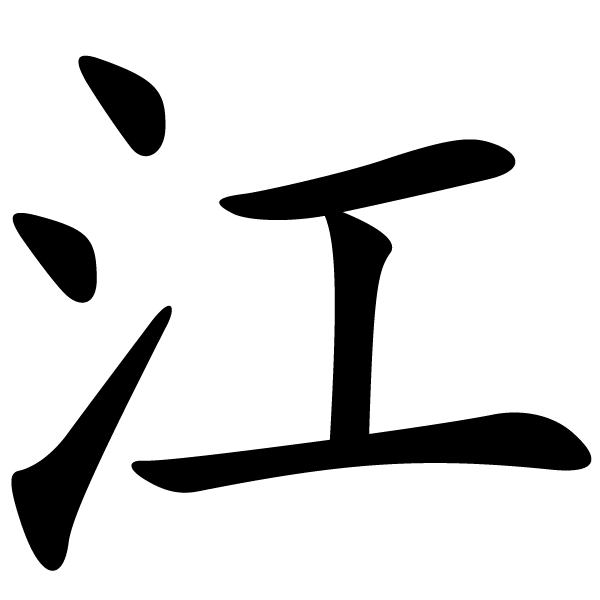

Origin
- Origin: State of Jiang (江国)
- Meaning: Yangtze River

Other names
- Alternative spelling: Chiang, Kong, Kang

Jiang (Chinese: 江; Jyutping: Gong^{1}; Pe̍h-ōe-jī: Kang, also romanized Chiang, Kong, Kang) is a Chinese surname, accounting for 0.26% of the Han Chinese population. It is the 52nd most common Chinese surname and is the 141st surname listed in the Hundred Family Surnames poem, contained in the line 江童顏郭 (Jiāng, Tóng, Yán, Guō). It is the 75th most common surname in China (2007), and the 25th most common surname in Taiwan (2010).

== Origins ==
According to the Yuanhe Xingzuan, a descendant of Boyi was at some point enfeoffed as ruler of the state of Jiang.

During the Spring and Autumn period, Jiang was often under attack from the neighboring states of Chu, Song, and Qi. While defending from neighbors' attacks, Jiang also had to deal with the Huai River's frequent flooding, which often inundated the state's central areas. These difficulties prevented Jiang from developing significant economic or military power. It survived until 623 BC when it was destroyed by Chu.

After its destruction, many of its surviving inhabitants fled to what is now Henan Province and adopted "Jiang" as their clan name (shi).

== Notable people named 江 ==
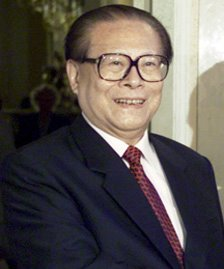
Jiang Zemin (江泽民)

- Jiang Qing (江青; 1914–1991), also known as Madame Mao, Chinese communist revolutionary, actress, and major political figure
- Chiang Ching (Jiang Qing, 江青; 1946–), a Chinese-American dancer and film actress
- Johnny Chiang (江啓臣), Taiwanese politician, leader of Kuomintang
- Jiang Zemin (江泽民), former General Secretary of the Chinese Communist Party
- March Kong Fong Eu (江月桂), first Asian American woman elected to state constitutional office in US
- John Chiang, Californian politician
- Jiang Kanghu, Chinese politician and activist
- Jiang Hongjie, Chinese politician and activist
- Jody Chiang (江蕙), Taiwanese pop singer
- Jiang Yu Chen (江語晨), Taiwanese pop singer
- Maggie Chiang (江美琪), Taiwanese pop singer
- Jiang Zhujiu, Chinese Go player
- Jiang Dihua, mathematician
- Jiang Heping, CCTV executive
- Jiang Hong, Chinese footballer
- Jiang Wen-Ye, Taiwanese composer
- Mingjiu Jiang, Chinese professional Go player
- Jiang Chaozong, Chinese general and Premier of the Republic of China
- Jiang Yan (poet), Southern Dynasty poet
- Empress Jiang, Liu Song dynasty empress
- Jiang Qian, Chinese intellectual
- Jiang Ge, murder victim
- Chiang Pin-kung, Chairperson of Straits Exchange Foundation (2008–2012)
- Jiang Xueqin (江学勤)
- Jiang Yuyuan, Chinese gymnast
- Chiang Sheng, Taiwanese martial arts actor
- Jiang Zhujiu, Chinese Go player
- Leslie Kong, Chinese Jamaican record producer
- Wah Kau Kong (1919–1944), Chinese-American fighter pilot
- Kong Duen-Yee (江端仪, 1923–1966), Hong Kong actor
- Cecilia Chiang (Chiang Sun Yun, 江孫芸; 1920–2020), a Chinese-American restaurateur and chef, best known for founding and managing the Mandarin Restaurant in San Francisco, California.
- Philip Chiang, son of Cecilia Chiang, co-founder of P. F. Chang's China Bistro
