= Chiang =

Chiang may mean:

- Chiang, a variant spelling of several Chinese surnames commonly spelled Jiang
  - Chiang Kai-shek – Chinese politician and military leader (1887–1975)
  - Chiang Ching-kuo – President of Taiwan from 1978 to 1988
- Chi'ang, variant spelling of the ancient Qiang (historical people) (羌)
- Chi'ang, variant spelling of the modern Qiang people (羌族) in Wenchuan
- Chiang (place name), a term for 'city' in Northern Thailand and surrounding areas

== See also ==
- Jiang (disambiguation)
