= Jiāng (state) =

Ancient Pre-Qin Chinese state 江

Jiang 江
- ?–623 BCE
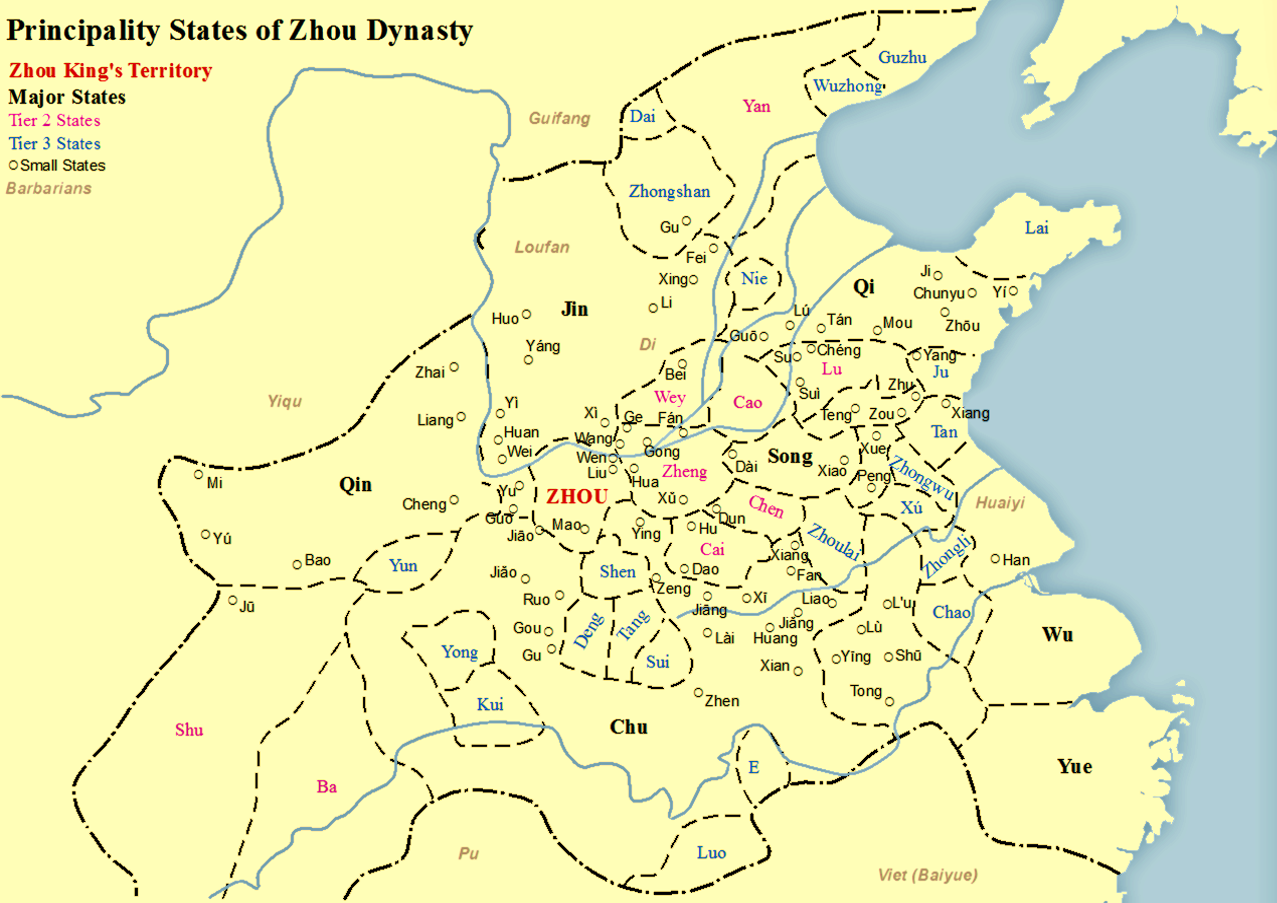
- Map showing states of the Zhou dynasty
- Capital: Zhengyang County, Henan
- Government: Monarchy
- Historical era: Shang dynasty? Western Zhou, Spring and Autumn period
  - Established: ?
  - Annexed by Chu: 623 BCE
- Today part of: China

Jiang (Chinese: 江; pinyin: Jiāng), also known as Hong (Chinese: 鴻) during the Shang dynasty or Qiong (Chinese: 邛) in some historical sources, was a vassal state in China that encompassed the southeastern part of Henan until it was destroyed by Chu in 623 BCE. It was ruled by the Ying family (Chinese: 嬴), and the state name is widely believed to be the origin of the Chinese surname Jiang. The swan goose was the totem of the state.

== History ==
=== As a vassal state of the Zhou dynasty ===
The Yuanhe Xingzuan claims that the descendants of Boyi (who bore the surname Ying) were enfeoffed in Jiang. Later, when the state was destroyed, members of the former ruling family adopted Jiang as their surname. According to the Records of the Grand Historian and Shiben, the State of Jiang was located in the southeastern part of Zhengyang County near the northern riverbanks of the Huai River during the Zhou dynasty. The capital of Jiang at the time was a rectangular plot of land measuring 175,000 m^{2} in size and existed until the Han dynasty. It is estimated that about 10,000 people resided in the state at the time. The state was relatively prosperous during the Western Zhou dynasty, but the continuous warfare during the Spring and Autumn period and occasional flooding near the Huai River weakened the state. The state was also sandwiched between the more powerful states of Chu, Song, and Qi at the time, which limited the political, economic, and military influence of the state as Jiang had to be vassals of these larger states in order to maintain their sovereignty.

At some point between 671 BC and 626 BC, King Cheng of Chu arranged for his younger sister, Jiang Mi (Chinese: 江羋) to be married to the leader of the State of Jiang at the time. The State of Jiang became wary of Chu territorial expansion, and they allied with the hegemon of China, Duke Huan of Qi, in 658 BC.

=== Annexation by Chu ===
After the death of King Cheng of Chu, Chu invaded the State of Jiang in 624 BC. The invasion was unsuccessful as the State of Jin intervened and drove Chu forces back to their homeland temporarily. In fall 623 BC, King Mu of Chu launched another invasion and successfully annexed Jiang. According to Zuo Zhuan, the annexation of Jiang deeply saddened Duke Mu of Qin.

== Geography and excavation findings ==
The territory of Jiang encompassed southern Zhengyang County, Pingqiao District in Xinyang, and northern Luoshan County. Jiang was located on the riverbanks of the Huai River. The ruins of the former Jiang capital are located in Zhengyang County and on the northern riverbanks of the Huai River. The rectangular city covers 75,000 square meters, and the distance between the easternmost and westernmost points of the city and the distance between the northernmost point and southernmost point of the city are 2 kilometers and 1.2 kilometers respectively. The city is a kilometer from the Huai River, and located on high ground. The city was called the 'Phoenix's Watchtower (Chinese: 鳳凰台)' in ancient times, and locals nicknamed the ruins 'watchtower' nowadays. The city was also referenced to as 'Jiang Ting (Chinese: 江亭)' in some historical sources. Bronze tools were also found in the ruins of the city.

== See also ==
- Spring and Autumn period
