= Chine (disambiguation) =

A chine is a steep-sided river valley where a river flows through coastal cliffs to a sea.

Chine or chines may also refer to:

- Chine (boating), a relatively sharp angle in a boat's hull
- Chine (aeronautics), a long extension of the wing roots along the fuselage
- Chine people, a Native American tribe in 17th-century Florida
- Chine, the bony part of a meat chop
  - Stuffed chine, a traditional dish of Lincolnshire
- Chine, the back of the blade on a scythe
- Chine, the French name for China
- Chiné, a warp printed silk fabric
