= L'Autrichienne =

L'Autrichienne is the feminine form of the French word L'Autrichien, meaning "The Austrian". It may refer to:

- A derogatory nickname for Queen Marie Antoinette of France
  - L'Autrichienne (film), a 1990 French film on Marie Antoinette with Ute Lemper
- L'Autrichienne (Jucifer album), 2008

== See also ==
- Autrichien, a variety of grape, a wine grape cultivar
- Austrian (disambiguation)
- Chien (disambiguation)
