= Jiang =

Jiang may refer to:

- Jiang (rank), rank held by general officers in the military of China
- Jiang (surname), several Chinese surnames
  - Jiang Zemin (1926–2022), as general secretary of the Chinese Communist Party
  - Jiang Yiyi (2001-), Chinese actress, 蒋依依
- Jiang River, an ancient river of China
- Jiang County, in Shanxi, China
- Fermented bean paste, known as 酱 (jiàng) in Chinese
- Jiāng (state), ancient Chinese state in modern Zhengyang County, Henan
- Jiǎng (state), ancient Chinese state in modern Gushi County, Henan
- jiang (将), function word in bǎ construction
