= Austrian =

Austrian may refer to:

- Austrians, someone from Austria or of Austrian descent
  - Someone who is considered an Austrian citizen
- Austrian German dialect
- Something associated with the country Austria, for example:
  - Austria-Hungary
  - Austrian Airlines (AUA)
  - Austrian cuisine
  - Austrian Empire
  - Austrian monarchy
  - Austrian German (language/dialects)
  - Austrian literature
  - Austrian nationality law
  - Austrian Service Abroad
  - Music of Austria
  - Austrian School of Economics
- Economists of the Austrian school of economic thought

== See also ==
- Austria (disambiguation)
- Australian (disambiguation)
- L'Autrichienne (disambiguation)
