= University Alliance in Talent Education Development =

Educational organization based in Taipei, Taiwan

- 全球产学未来人才培育策略联盟 (Chinese)
- Abbreviation: UAiTED
- Formation: 2019; 7 years ago
- Purpose: To assist in the preparation, promotion, and professional development of future talents
- Headquarters: Taiwan
- Location: Taipei
- Members: 16 Universities
- Website: uaited.ust.edu.tw

Chinese name
- Simplified Chinese: 全球产学未来人才培育策略联盟
- Traditional Chinese: 全球產學未來人才培育策略聯盟
Transcriptions
Standard Mandarin
- Hanyu Pinyin: Quánqiú Chǎn Xué Wèilái Réncái Péiyù Cèlüè Liánméng

The University Alliance in Talent Education Development (UAiTED) is the organizational body that includes 16 universities from Singapore, Hong Kong, Taiwan & Malaysia. It is a strategic network of academic, profit and nonprofit professional associations and organizations who are committed to assist in the preparation, promotion, and professional development of future talents.

UAiTED focuses on four main areas:

- Industry internships
- Education
- Innovation
- Industry-academia collaboration

== List of member institutions ==
| Institution | Country/Region |
|---|---|
| National University of Singapore | Singapore |
| Nanyang Technological University | Singapore |
| University of Malaya | Malaysia |
| Universiti Tunku Abdul Rahman | Malaysia |
| Universiti Putra Malaysia | Malaysia |
| Universiti Kebangsaan Malaysia | Malaysia |
| Universiti Sains Malaysia | Malaysia |
| Hong Kong University of Science and Technology | Hong Kong |
| City University of Hong Kong | Hong Kong |
| National Tsing Hua University | Taiwan |
| National Yang Ming Chiao Tung University | Taiwan |
| National Cheng Kung University | Taiwan |
| National Taiwan University of Science and Technology | Taiwan |
| National Taiwan Normal University | Taiwan |
| National Central University | Taiwan |
| National Chengchi University | Taiwan |
