= Chien Shan-hua =

Taiwanese musicologist

- 錢善華
- Occupation: Musicologist

Chien Shan-hua (Chinese: 錢善華; pinyin: Qián Shànhuá) is a Taiwanese musicologist. He is currently a professor at the Graduate Institute of Ethnomusicology and the Department of Music at National Taiwan Normal University. He has also been the dean of the College of Music and the director of the Graduate Institute of Ethnomusicology at National Taiwan Normal University. His fields of interest include composition, musical theory, the history of western music, choral conducting, world music, Asian music, Austronesian music, the music of Taiwanese aboriginals, and ethnomusicology.

Chien began his undergraduate studies in the Department of Music at National Taiwan Normal University in 1972. He studied vocal music under Tai Su-lun (戴序倫) and Tseng Shiou-ling (鄭秀玲) and composition under Liu Te-yi (劉德義).

In 1978 Chien began his master studies at the University of California, Irvine. He studied choral conducting under Joseph P. Huszti, composition under Peter S. Odegard, and vocal music under Mahlon Schanzenbach. Chien went to study at the University of Music and Performing Arts, Vienna in 1984. He studied composition under Thomas Christian David and Francis Burt. He graduated from the University of Music and Performing Arts, Vienna in 1986 with a diploma in composition.

Chien's works include solo pieces, solo vocal pieces, choral pieces, chamber music, and orchestral pieces. He has been dedicated to the studies of the ethnomusicology of the aborigines and the Austronesians in Taiwan. He has been awarded the composition scholarship of the Alban Berg Stiftung, the selection award of musical composition of the Ministry of Culture, Republic of China, and the commission of the Ministry of Culture, Republic of China.

Chien has been the chairman of the Department of Music and the director of the Graduate Institute of Ethnomusicology at National Taiwan Normal University. Chien has also been the conductor of many choral groups, including the chorus of National Taiwan University, the Department of Music at National Taiwan Normal University, Yin Qi Culture and Music Foundation, and the Taipei YMCA. He has also been the president of the Association of Music Education, R.O.C. and the International Society for Contemporary Music, Taiwan Section.

== Education ==
- M.M., the University of California, Irvine.
- Komposition Diplom, the University of Music and Performing Arts, Vienna.

== Works ==
- Austronesian Sentiment (2014)
- Sequence VII, for Voice Solo (2014)
- Ode on Austronesia (2014)
- Ode to the Ocean (2009)
- Sequence VI (2009)
- Painoforte (2008)
- Chamber Music 2006 for Flute, Clarinet and String Quartet (2006)
- Chamber Music 2005 Trio for Flute, Violin and Cello (2005)
- Sequence V (2004)
- Sequence IV (2001)
- Sequence III (1999)
- Sequence II (1997)
- Sequence I (1996)
