= Stuffed chine =

Herb-filled pork dish of Lincolnshire, England

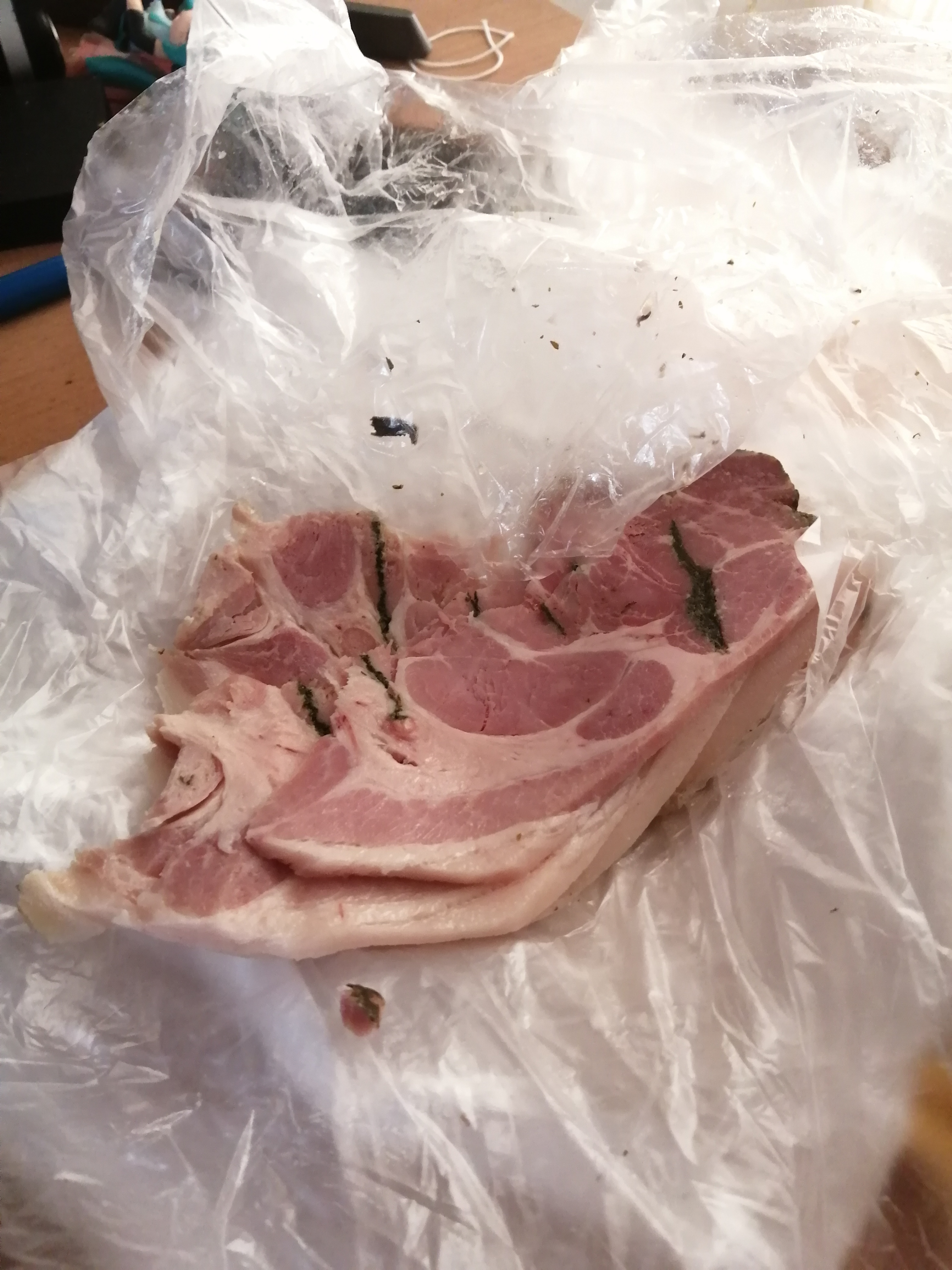
- Stuffed chine, pictured in Louth.
- Course: Main
- Place of origin: United Kingdom
- Region or state: Lincolnshire, possibly from the Boston area.
- Serving temperature: Cold
- Main ingredients: Pork, parsley

Pronunciation of stuffed chine

Stuffed chine is a traditional dish of salt pork filled with herbs, typically parsley, associated with the English county of Lincolnshire.

== Preparation ==
The neck chine, a cut of a pig taken from between the shoulder blades, is preserved in brine. The meat is then deeply scored and much chopped parsley and other ingredients are stuffed into the cuts. The other ingredients are normally kept secret but an 1894 recipe from the Grantham Journal recommended, in addition to parsley, 'a little thyme, mint, pot marjoram, young cabbage leaves and lettuce'. The dish is simmered slowly, then served sliced cold, when it presents attractively contrasting stripes of pink and green.

== History and literature ==
Food writer Jane Grigson gave a recipe in The Observer in March 1984.

The poet Paul Verlaine, who in the mid-1870s spent a year as a schoolmaster just north of Boston, liked stuffed chine so much that he tried unsuccessfully to find it elsewhere in England.

In 1936 the Sunderland Daily Echo reported that chine was a traditional dish served on Trinity Sunday in Old Clee, north-east Lincolnshire.
