= Rivière aux Chiens =

Rivière aux Chiens (English: River of the dogs) may refer to:

- Rivière aux Chiens (Côte-de-Beaupré), a river in Capitale-Nationale, Quebec, Canada
- Rivière aux Chiens (rivière des Mille Îles), a river in Les Laurentides Regional County Municipality, Quebec, Canada
