= Jiang Xueqin =

Chinese-born Canadian educator (born 1976)

- 江学勤
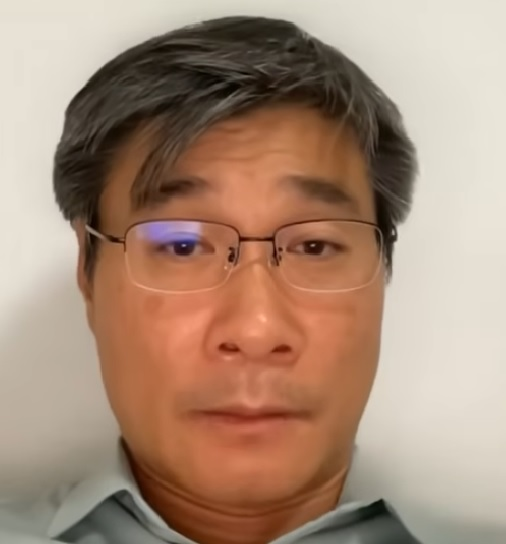
- Jiang in 2025
- Born: 1976 (age 49–50); Taishan, Guangdong, China
- Citizenship: Canada
- Education: Yale University (BA)
- Occupations: School teacher; YouTuber; blogger

Substack information
- Newsletter: Predictive History Substack

YouTube information
- Channel: Predictive History
- Subscribers: 2.96 million
- Views: 110 million
- Last updated: 3 November 2026

Jiang Xueqin (Chinese: 江学勤; pinyin: Jiāng Xuéqín; born 1976) is a Chinese-born Canadian educator, education reformer and former high school teacher. He is best known for his YouTube channel Predictive History, on which he styles himself as "Professor Jiang", despite not teaching at the university level and not being an actual professor.

In the 2000s, he was involved in education reforms in China. He gained notoriety on the Internet after having correctly predicted Donald Trump's election for president of the United States in 2024 and the following war between Iran and the United States.

== Early life and education ==
Jiang Xueqin was born in Taishan, Guangdong, China, in 1976. He and his family emigrated to Canada in 1983, when he was six years old, and he was raised in Toronto. His father worked as a short order cook in a restaurant, and his mother was a seamstress. Jiang later recalled that his family went for years without a car and did not take vacations, and that much of his childhood leisure consisted of reading, watching television, and playing with Lego. He recalled in 2026 that he had a poor childhood.

When he was in ninth grade, a substitute teacher encouraged Jiang to apply for college in the United States. While preparing to apply, Jiang became an editor of his school newspaper, joined a soccer team, and studied for the SAT while commuting on the subway. He was admitted to Yale University in 1995.

As an undergraduate at Yale, he applied unsuccessfully for a fellowship to study Mandarin in Beijing and decided to seek an opportunity to teach English in China instead. Through a Yale classmate from Beijing, Jiang applied to teach at the Affiliated High School of Peking University, where he subsequently spent six months as a teacher in 1998 while still an undergraduate. He graduated from Yale with a Bachelor of Arts in English literature with distinction in 1999.

== Career ==
After graduating from Yale, Jiang began working for foreign news outlets as a journalist, focusing on China. He unsuccessfully applied to multiple major news outlets, including The New Yorker. In 2000, Jiang moved to Beijing, where he worked as a freelance journalist, writing for publications such as the American Christian Science Monitor and the Hong Kong-based Far Eastern Economic Review.

In 2001, Jiang was contracted to conduct an undercover U.S.-funded PBS documentary about the labor movement in China. While filming one such protest in Daqing in 2002, Jiang was arrested and detained for two days before being deported from China. A friend claimed that he was accused of "making illegal video recordings" and suspected of spying. No charges were filed.

In 2003, Jiang was allowed to return to China, where he decided to abandon freelance journalism and pursue educational reform instead at "high-profile schools".

In 2008, Jiang initiated educational reforms at Shenzhen Middle School in a push for a more liberal system of learning, with a focus on creativity.

Jiang has since held senior administrative and teaching positions at several prominent Chinese secondary schools, including:

- Deputy Principal, Shenzhen Middle School (2008–2010)
- Program Director, Peking University High School International Division (2010–2012)
- Tsinghua University's Affiliate High School (2014)
- History and philosophy teacher, Moonshot Academy Beijing (2022–2026).

He was a researcher with the Global Education Innovation Initiative at the Harvard Graduate School of Education and a fellow of the Royal Society of Arts, and he has served on the selection committee for the Global Teacher Prize.

His writing has appeared in The New York Times (Chinese edition), CNN, China Youth Daily, The Wall Street Journal, and The Chronicle of Higher Education.

== YouTube channel ==
In 2023, Jiang created the YouTube channel Predictive History. The initial intention was recording his classes for students to review. He describes his channel as employing structural historical analysis, game theory, and concepts inspired by Isaac Asimov's fictional psychohistory to interpret and predict important geopolitical developments.

Jiang's 2024 Geo-Strategy episode "The Iran Trap" attracted international attention, predicting the re-election of Donald Trump in 2024 and escalating U.S. involvement in a conflict with Iran (cf. the 2025 and 2026 conflicts) and eventual U.S. loss, the first two of which have come true as of 2026. According to India Today, other analysts had made similar predictions, but "Jiang packaged them early and memorably".

=== Reception ===
While some media outlets described Jiang's 2024 lecture on Iran as prophetic (earning him the moniker "Nostradamus of China"), others criticized it for relying on selective historical analogies, not showing his game theory work, and making untestable assumptions. India Today said that his geopolitical analyses glaringly do not feature Chinese foreign policy or internal problems of China, even though he resides in the country. In an interview with Mehdi Hasan on Zeteo, Jiang said that he uses a VPN to circumvent internet censorship in China, adding, "I do not talk to reporters in China, because I'm conscious that whatever I say online could be used against me". The South China Morning Post noted that Jiang is mainly popular outside China, though some of his English-language lectures have been translated and uploaded to Chinese social media.

The Free Press and the South China Morning Post have accused Jiang of promoting conspiracy theories about the Illuminati, Freemasons, Jesuits, and Sabbateans controlling the Western world. Yang Meng, an assistant professor at Peking University, has argued in the National Post that Jiang has promoted the antisemitic notion that Israel has practiced ritual child sacrifice in the Gaza war.

==== "Professor" moniker ====
Jiang's usage of the title "Professor", despite only being a high school teacher, has also been described as misleading. He has defended the practice, saying that he only started using the title after fans began calling him by that name.

== Personal life ==
Jiang is a Canadian citizen. He is married and has three children.

== Publications ==
- 江. 学. 勤. (2014). 创新中国教育 [Creative China]. 中央编译出版社. ISBN 978-7-5117-2072-6.
- Schools for the Soul. 2021.
- "China's media enables tyranny and corruption". CNN. 23 November 2017.
