= Chien Lee (composer) =

Taiwan composer

Chien Lee (Chinese: 李健; September 26, 1932 – January 21, 1997), formerly known as Tsu-Chi Lee and also writing under the pen name Ji-Zi, was a Taiwanese composer and music educator. He was born in Haikou City, which was then part of the Hainan Special Economic Zone and is now part of Hainan Province, and he moved to Taiwan in 1950. Lee was skilled in composing and wrote many military songs, including "Squad of Heroes", "I Have a Rifle", "Night Raid", "Upright and Equal Spirit", and "Song of the Cheng-Kung Hill." He also composed choral music, operas, art songs, children's songs, and Bangdi concertos. These works often reflect the social background against which they were created.

== Early life ==
Lee grew up in a family with a strong musical atmosphere and often played sizhu music with his elders while also self-learning the piano. In 1950, he moved to Taiwan with the Republic of China Army in Hainan and briefly worked as a music teacher at Kaohsiung Meinong Junior High School. The following year, he entered the Music Department of the Special Service Office of the Army Headquarters as a music instructor, during which he wrote many pieces that were published in various newspapers and collections, including the Central Daily News, China Daily News, Taiwan Shin Sheng Daily News, Youth Warrior Daily, Honesty and Loyalty Newspaper, and Songs of Justice Collection, and he won the first prize and honorable mentions in the Military Song Contest sponsored by the Friends of Armed Forces Association.

In October 1956, Lee entered the Music Department of Fu Hsing Kang College (later renamed Fu Hsing Kang College, National Defense University) and graduated from there. He was then reassigned to the Second Office of the Political Department of the Combined Logistics Command as the Second Lieutenant Music Instructor from 1958 to 1962. During this period, he continued to create military songs, art songs, and songs for children, and in November 1960, he was awarded the title of Outstanding Recreational Personnel by the Ministry of National Defense

== Personal details ==
In 1959, Lee married Ping-Kuan Liu (1933- ) on April 5, National Music Day. His wife was a music teacher at the Provincial School for the Deaf and the Blind (later renamed Taipei School for the Visually Impaired), and Lee composed several songs for children as teaching materials for her students during her tenure. Lee and Liu named their four children with "Yueh (music)", "Yun (rhyme)", "Sheng (sound)", and "Chin (plucked stringed instrument)". Their second son, Tzyy-Sheng, followed his father's footsteps and became renowned Taiwanese composer. Their daughters, Tzyy-Yun and Yu-Chin, have long dedicated themselves to music education and promotion

== Teaching experience ==
- From 1963 to 1979, Lee taught in the Music Department of the Music Department of Fu Hsing Kang College.
- From 1979 to 1992, he was employed as a full-time teacher in Chinese Music Department at National Taiwan Academy of Arts (later renamed National Taiwan University of Arts).

== Musical genres ==
According to the available literature, Lee composed 84 military songs and choruses, 15 art songs, 5 operas and cantatas, 27 children's songs, and 5 other types of works. Some of his works are listed below:

=== Military Songs ===
- "Squad of Heroes" (1962)
- "I Have a Rifle" (1962)
- "Night Raid" (1962)
- "Going to Battlefield" (1970) (won the Military Song Bronze Statue Award at the Armed Forces Golder Statue Awards for Literature and Art)
- "Upright and Equal Spirit" (1970)
- "Song of the Cheng-Kung Hill" (1977)

=== Choruses ===
- "Ode to Longevity"(1966) (won the Music Chorus Golden Statue Award at the Armed Forces Golder Statue Awards for Literature and Art)
- "Long Live the Republic of China"
- "In Every Minute"

=== Operas and cantatas ===
- "Attack on the Liao-Tung Bay" (1970) (won the Small Opera Silver Statue Award at National Defense Cultural and Artistic Awards)
- Cantata "Riding out the Storm Together" (1972)
- "Dawn" (1977)
- "The Restoration of Two Cities" (1978–81) (featured as the grand finale of the Taipei Arts Festival in 1981)

=== Art songs' ===
- "Hearing a Flute on a Spring Night in Luoyang" (1952/1972)
- "The Song of the War Drum" (1953/1961) (recognized as an Honorable Mention at the call for submissions contest held by the Chinese Writers' & Artists' Association)
- "Yearning" (1950s)
- "Home is the Best" (1971) (won the Best Solo Performance Award for Patriotic Song at the 2nd Huang Tzu Memorial Lyrics and Music Creation Awards)
- "Moonlit Night" (1984)

=== Children's songs ===
- "Happy Children Love to Sing" (1958) (won the Children's Song First Prize at the Broadcasting Corporation of China's Song Contest)
- "The Moon is Up" (1958) (won the Children's Song Honorable Mention at the Broadcasting Corporation of China's Song Contest)

=== Others ===
- Bangdi concertos "Cowboy Love Song" (1979) (featured in the album "Cheng Si-Sum's Work: Bamboo")
- Orchestral music "Anti-Japanese War of Resistance Suite"
