= Zhengyang County =

Zhengyang County 正阳县 Chengyang
- County
- Location of the seat in Henan
- Coordinates: 32°36′22″N 114°23′35″E
- Country: People's Republic of China
- Province: Henan
- Prefecture-level city: Zhumadian

Area
  - Total: 1,904 km^{2} (735 sq mi)

Population (2019)
  - Total: 623,800
  - Density: 327.6/km^{2} (848.5/sq mi)
- Time zone: UTC+8 (China Standard)
- Postal code: 463600

Zhengyang County (simplified Chinese: 正阳县; traditional Chinese: 正陽縣; pinyin: Zhèngyáng Xiàn) is a county in the southeast of Henan province, China. It is under the administration of the prefecture-level city of Zhumadian.

== Administrative divisions ==
As of 2012, this county is divided to 6 towns and 13 townships.

Towns

- Zhenyang (真阳镇)
- Handong (寒冻镇)
- Runanbu (汝南埠镇)
- Tongzhong (铜钟镇)
- Dougou (陡沟镇)
- Xiongzhai (熊寨镇)

Townships

- Shenshui Township (慎水乡)
- Fuzhai Township (傅寨乡)
- Yuanzhai Township (袁寨乡)
- Xinruandian Township (新阮店乡)
- Youfangdian Township (油坊店乡)
- Leizhai Township (雷寨乡)
- Wangwuqiao Township (王勿桥乡)
- Yongxing Township (永兴乡)
- Lühe Township (吕河乡)
- Dalin Township (大林乡)
- Pidian Township (皮店乡)
- Pengqiao Township (彭桥乡)
- Lanqing Township (兰青乡)

== Climate ==
Climate data for Zhengyang, elevation 85 m (279 ft), (1991–2020 normals, extremes 1981–present)
Month	Jan	Feb	Mar	Apr	May	Jun	Jul	Aug	Sep	Oct	Nov	Dec	Year
Record high °C (°F)	20.5 (68.9)	26.4 (79.5)	33.7 (92.7)	34.4 (93.9)	37.8 (100.0)	39.6 (103.3)	40.3 (104.5)	39.0 (102.2)	38.6 (101.5)	34.7 (94.5)	29.2 (84.6)	21.7 (71.1)	40.3 (104.5)
Mean daily maximum °C (°F)	6.7 (44.1)	10.1 (50.2)	15.3 (59.5)	22.0 (71.6)	27.2 (81.0)	30.8 (87.4)	32.3 (90.1)	30.9 (87.6)	27.2 (81.0)	22.4 (72.3)	15.3 (59.5)	9.0 (48.2)	20.8 (69.4)
Daily mean °C (°F)	1.9 (35.4)	5.0 (41.0)	9.9 (49.8)	16.3 (61.3)	21.6 (70.9)	25.8 (78.4)	27.9 (82.2)	26.4 (79.5)	22.1 (71.8)	16.8 (62.2)	10.0 (50.0)	4.1 (39.4)	15.7 (60.2)
Mean daily minimum °C (°F)	−1.6 (29.1)	1.0 (33.8)	5.5 (41.9)	11.3 (52.3)	16.6 (61.9)	21.3 (70.3)	24.3 (75.7)	23.0 (73.4)	18.2 (64.8)	12.6 (54.7)	6.0 (42.8)	0.5 (32.9)	11.6 (52.8)
Record low °C (°F)	−18.1 (−0.6)	−12.4 (9.7)	−6.5 (20.3)	−1.0 (30.2)	5.1 (41.2)	11.5 (52.7)	17.5 (63.5)	14.2 (57.6)	8.1 (46.6)	1.1 (34.0)	−7.9 (17.8)	−14.9 (5.2)	−18.1 (−0.6)
Average precipitation mm (inches)	27.0 (1.06)	32.8 (1.29)	52.8 (2.08)	65.4 (2.57)	97.6 (3.84)	145.6 (5.73)	175.6 (6.91)	154.1 (6.07)	74.4 (2.93)	64.1 (2.52)	44.5 (1.75)	21.8 (0.86)	955.7 (37.61)
Average precipitation days (≥ 0.1 mm)	6.6	7.6	8.1	8.3	9.9	9.2	11.1	10.9	9.2	8.2	7.2	6.0	102.3
Average snowy days	5.0	3.8	1.4	0	0	0	0	0	0	0	0.7	2.3	13.2
Average relative humidity (%)	71	71	70	70	70	72	80	82	77	71	71	70	73
Mean monthly sunshine hours	123.2	122.8	156.0	185.2	192.0	181.8	193.7	175.3	150.8	149.6	138.8	134.0	1,903.2
Percentage possible sunshine	39	39	42	47	45	43	45	43	41	43	45	43	43
Source: China Meteorological Administration
