= Jiang Hongjie =

Jiang Honjie
- 江洪傑
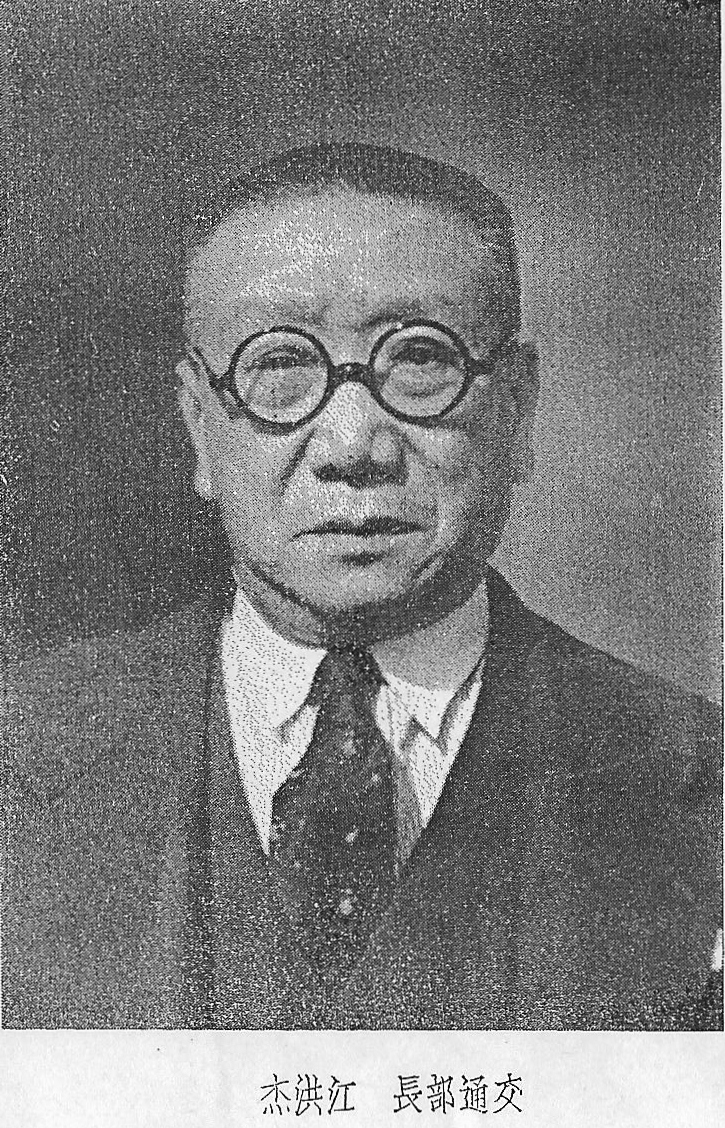
- Jiang Honjie in 1940
- Born: 1876; Jingde, Anhui, China
- Died: unknown unknown
- Education: Meiji University

Jiang Hongjie (simplified Chinese: 江洪杰; traditional Chinese: 江洪傑; pinyin: Jiāng Hóngjié; Wade–Giles: Chiang Hung-chieh; Hepburn: Kō Kōketsu; born 1876) was a politician, diplomat and industrialist in the late Empire of China and early Republic of China. He was also an important politician in the Reformed Government of the Republic of China. His courtesy name was Ziyin (子因).

== Biography ==
Jiang Hongjie was born in Jingde, Anhui. He studied law at Meiji University in Tokyo, Japan, from which he graduated with a Bachelor of Law degree. In 1897 he became the professor of Law in the Provincial College of Law in Shandong. In 1899 he was appointed as a district magistrate in the same province.

In 1907 Jiang Hongjie entered the Chinese Imperial diplomatic service as Vice-Counsul at Yokohama. After the Xinhai Revolution and the establishment of the Republic of China, in 1912 he was appointed private secretary to the Minister for Foreign Affairs. In 1915 he became First Secretary of the Chinese Legation in Tokyo. In 1921, 1922, 1925, 1930 and 1931 he served Charge d'Affairs. In 1931 he promoted be Councillor of the Legation to Japan. Later he promoted be Acting Ambassador to Japan.

In March 1938 Liang Hongzhi established the Reformed Government of the Republic of China, and Jiang Hongjie was an early participant. In July, Jiang was appointed Minister for Communications, remaining in that post until March 1940, when the Reorganized National Government of China was established. He returned to private life, becoming president of the Chinese Transport Company (中華輸船株式会社).

After October 1940, the whereabouts of Jiang Hongjie are unknown.
