= Colleen V. Chien =

American attorney and academic

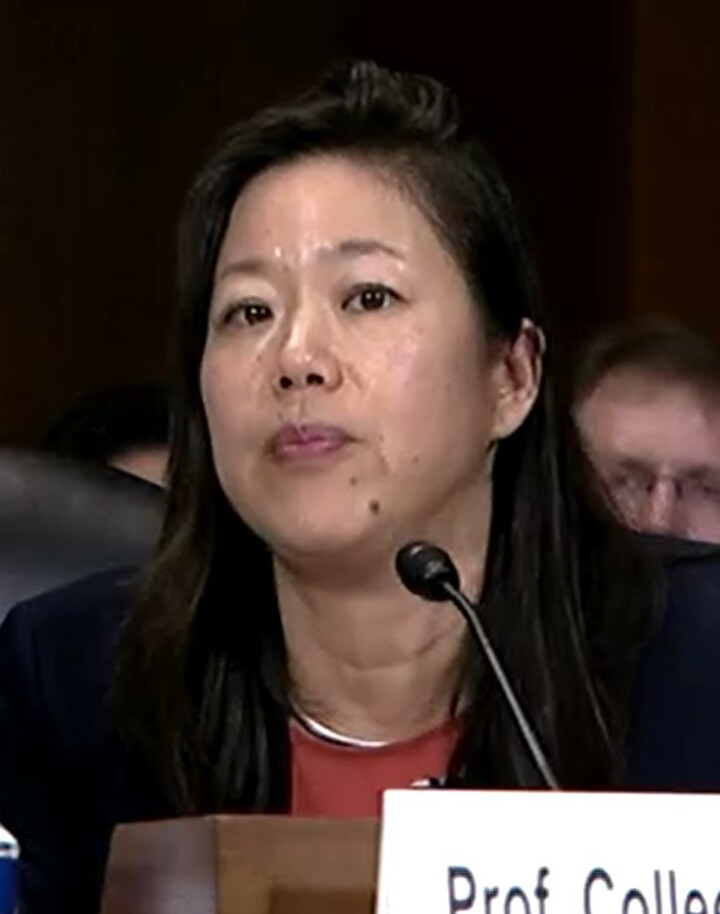
- Chien in 2019
- Born: September 10, 1973 (age 53); Hartford, Connecticut, U.S.

Academic background
- Education: Stanford University (BS, BA); University of California, Berkeley (JD)

Colleen V. Chien (Chinese: 錢為德; pinyin: Qián Wéidé; born September 10, 1973) is an Asian-American legal scholar who is a law professor at UC Berkeley School of Law, where she teaches, mentors students, and conducts cross-disciplinary research on innovation, intellectual property, and the criminal justice system, with a focus on how technology, data, and innovation can be harnessed to achieve their potential for social benefit. Her recent works focus on the use of artificial intelligence in legal practice.

== Education and career ==
Chien was born in Hartford, Connecticut, to immigrant parents Ronald Jen-Min Chien and Patsy Feng Chien from Taiwan. She studied at Paradise Canyon Elementary School in La Cañada Flintridge, California followed by the Polytechnic School in Pasadena. She then attended Stanford University and earned Bachelor of Arts and Bachelor of Science degrees in engineering there in 1996. Chien was an investigative journalist with the Philippine Center for Investigative Journalism as a Fulbright Scholar in 1997 before working as an analyst at Dean & Company until 1999. She studied at UC Berkeley School of Law from 1999 and obtained her J.D. in 2002.

From 2002 to 2012, Chien worked as an attorney at the Silicon Valley law firm Fenwick & West. From 2013 to 2015, Chien served as a senior advisor for intellectual property and innovation to Todd Park, the U.S. chief technology officer, in the White House's Office of Science and Technology Policy (OSTP). In that role, her projects included transferring green technology out of the federal government, using technology to improve education outcomes, making more federal government data available, open education resources, and technology cooperation with China.

Chien was a professor of law from 2007 to 2023 at Santa Clara University and was a visiting professor at Columbia Law School and University of Chicago Law School in 2019. In winter 2020, she was in the Transition Team during the Presidential transition of Joe Biden. Since 2023, Chien was a professor of law at UC Berkeley School of Law.

== Work and scholarship ==
Chien is best known for her patent scholarship, especially her work on patent "trolls" or patent assertion entities (PAEs). She coined the term PAE in a 2010 law review article, and many lawmakers subsequently adopted the term. She has published empirical studies on how patent litigation impacts startups and venture capitalists, and she has been a vocal proponent of reforming the patent system.

Chien founded the Paper Prisons Initiative, which draws attention to the tens of millions of Americans unable to access employment, housing, voting, and resentencing opportunities available under the law, due to their past involvement with the criminal justice system. This project is based on her 2020 Michigan Law Review paper, America's Paper Prisons: The Second Chance Gap.

Chien has also worked on patent quality issues, including testifying before the Senate Judiciary Committee.

In 2020, Chien was named a volunteer member of the Joe Biden presidential transition Agency Review Team to support transition efforts related to the Department of Commerce.

Other activism projects she has been involved with include ActLocal and Wall of Us.

== Awards ==
In 2017, the American Law Institute awarded her the "Young Scholar Medal," given every-other-year to "one or two outstanding early-career law professors." ALI said:

Her work on patent assertion business models – which rely on the use of patents to extract money from others rather than commercialize technology – has been the basis of studies and policy initiatives by the White House, the Federal Trade Commission, and Congress (in the America Invents Act), and the term has been referred to thousands of times by academic and news sources. Policy recommendations that she and her co-authors, in law review articles and other fora, have made have been adopted by the U.S. Supreme Court, in Congressional bills, at the US Patent and Trade Office, and by 32 states.

Other recognition Chien has received include:

- In 2017, the California State Bar's IP Section designated her as an "IP Vanguard" (in the academic category).
- In 2013, Managing Intellectual Property magazine named her one of the "Top 50 IP Thought Leaders in the World" and said that her work has "led the debate in the US [on patent trolls] and been behind many of the recent proposals for reform."
- In 2013, she was awarded the inaugural Eric Yamamoto Emerging Scholar Award by the Board of the Conference of Asian Pacific American Law Faculty (CAPALF)
- In 2013, she was named a Silicon Valley “Woman of Influence” by the Silicon Valley Business Journal, which called her "one of the most quotable and frequently consulted commentators on the patent system" and said she is "a leader in the national community of intellectual property scholars."
