= Inui =

- Pronunciation: [inɯꜜi]
- Language: Japanese

Origin
- Meaning: northwest

Inui (乾; lit. "northwest") is a Japanese surname. Notable people with the surname include:

- Daichi Inui (born 1989), Japanese association football player (J1 League)
- Emi Inui (born 1983), Japanese Olympic softball player
- Kurumi Inui (born 1963), Japanese novelist and mystery writer
- Masahiro Inui (born 1988), Japanese baseball player
- Sekihiko Inui (fl. 2005–present), Japanese manga artist
- Takashi Inui (born 1988), Japanese association football player in Europe
- Takaya Inui (born 1990), Japanese association football player (J2 League)
- Tatsuro Inui (born 1990), Japanese association football player in Southeast Asia
- Yukiko Inui (born 1990), Japanese synchronized swimmer

== Fictional characters ==
- Sadaharu Inui, character in The Prince of Tennis
- Takumi Inui, main character in Kamen Rider 555
- Inui Banjin, villain in the Rurouni Kenshin's Jinchu Arc (Man's Justice Arc)
- Inui Seishu, in Tokyo Revengers
- Inui Kagetora, character in Little Battlers Experience WARS
