= Chien Chung-liang =

Taiwanese politician

- 錢宗良

Deputy Minister of Science and Technology
- In office 2006 – March 2014

Personal details
- Education: National Taiwan University (BS, MS); Columbia University (PhD)

Chien Chung-liang (Chinese: 錢宗良; pinyin: Qián Zōngliáng) is a Taiwanese pathologist. He was the deputy minister of the Ministry of Science and Technology from 2006 to 2014.

== Education ==
Chien graduated from National Taiwan University with a bachelor's degree in zoology in 1984 and a master's degree in anatomy in 1989. He then pursued doctoral studies in the United States, earning his Ph.D. in pathology from Columbia University in 1995. His doctoral dissertation, completed at the College of Physicians and Surgeons under pathology professor Ronald K. Liem, was titled, "Functional and developmental studies of the neuronal intermediate filament protein α-internexin".

== Academic career ==
Chien was the associate professor of anatomy and cell biology of the College of Medicine of NTU in 1996-2006. In 1999, he was appointed as research scientist on cell biology at University of Tokyo, Japan. In 2007-2014, he was the deputy director of NTU Center of Genomic Medicine. In 2008-2014, he was the associate dean of NTU College of Medicine.

== Political career ==
In 2014, he was appointed as the Deputy Minister of the Interior, the position he held until 2016.
