= European Culture and Economy =

European Culture and Economy, shortened as ECUE, is an interdisciplinary postgraduate program that is distinct from European Studies. Both focus on European politics and developments. After receiving the academic degree Master of Arts, graduates of ECUE may engage in various business fields, however, especially EU-related professions are targeted.

== History ==
The Ruhr University Bochum in Germany is currently the only university to offer European Culture and Economy as a path of study. It is a small branch, approximately 30 students are accepted each year. It was first introduced in the winter term of 1999/2000 and has since become an established Masters program. Initially, ECUE was a way of giving arts scholars a fundamental understanding of economics, politics and intercultural competences. In its early stages, the program was supported financially by the German Academic Exchange Service (DAAD) as well as German Rectors' Conference (HRK). In 2007, its level of quality was confirmed by ACQUIN, a German Quality Assurance Institute. Students of ECUE are intended to qualify as specialized generalist and be prepared for careers in international companies and institutions. The expected duration of study is four terms.

== Curriculum ==
The curriculum puts an emphasis on examining the European area from an economic, cultural, political and sociological perspective. During Colloquia and an obligatory excursion (to Brussels), the interrelations of the disciplines are linked and investigated. Additionally, the students' intercultural competences and research methods are trained.

Seminars of the following disciplines are included in the program:

- Law
- Economics
- History
- Political science
- Sociology
- Cultural studies
- Philosophy

The interdisciplinary and intercultural approach teaches students to analyze European topics from a cultural, economical and political angle. Next to interdisciplinary, ECUE stresses international relations. Many of the available places are assigned to foreign students. So far, students of 30 different nations (Africa, U.S.A., Asia, many European countries) were able to successfully complete the program.

== Admission ==
To be granted admission to the program, a Bachelor's degree with high marks is required. Furthermore, students must possess a high proficiency in the teaching languages, English and German. Additionally, a term abroad or an internship are possible ways to organize the program.

== References and notes ==
- von Alemann; Münch (2006) Handbuch Europa in NRW - Wer macht was in NRW für Europa (p. 59,60)

Additional sources (in German)

- Fokus Online
- Kulturportal Deutschland

Translated versions:

- Translated: Kulturportal Deutschland
- Translated: Fokus Online
