= Les Chiens =

Canadian indie rock band

Le Chiens
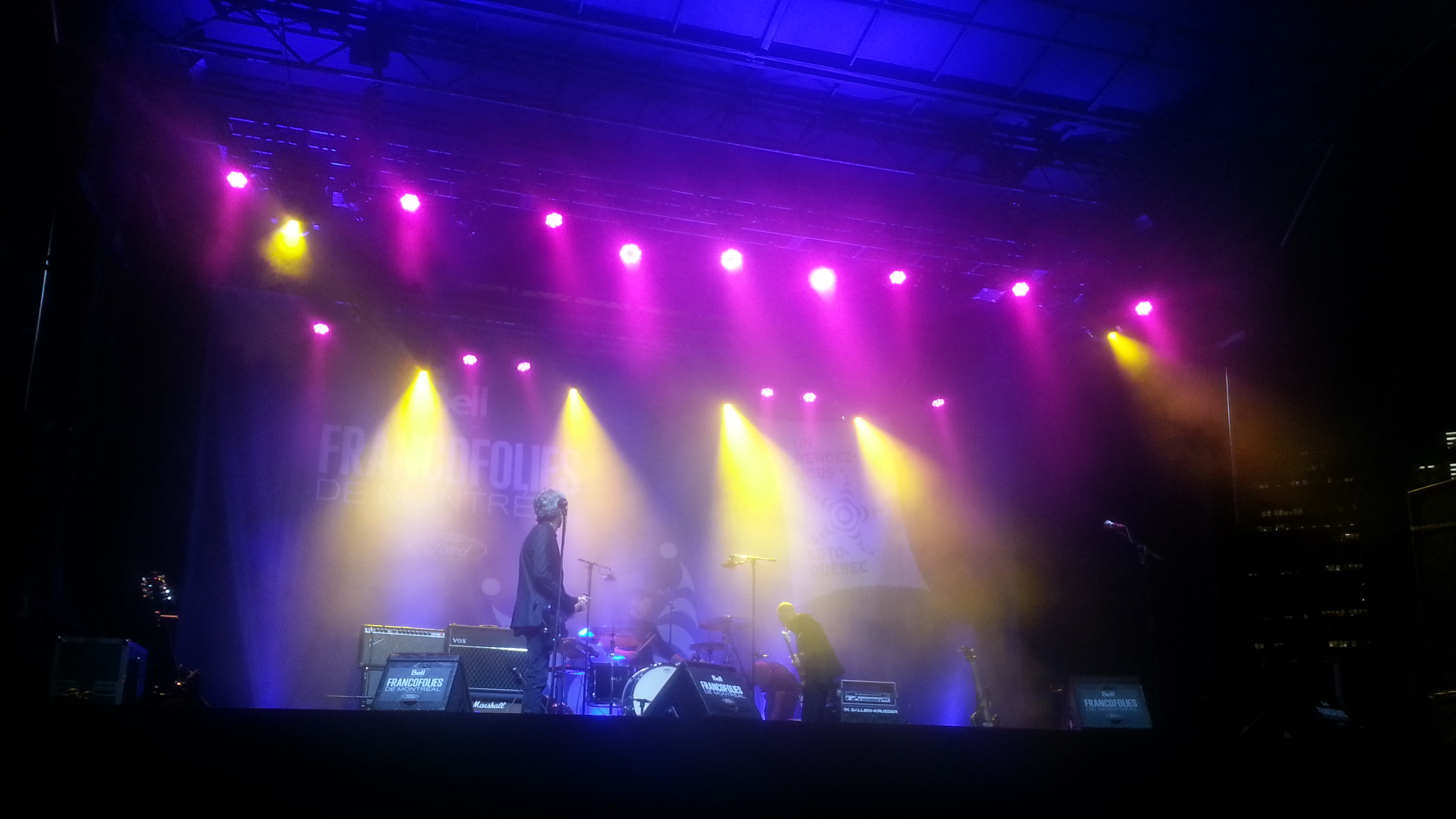
- Les Chiens - During live concert at Montreal Quebec, Canada (2016)

Background information
- Genre: Indie rock
- Years active: 1997–present
- Labels: La Tribu; Audiogram
- Members: Éric Goulet; Nicolas Jouannaut; Marc Chartrain
- Past members: Olivier Rénaldin

Les Chiens (The Dogs) is a Canadian indie rock band from Quebec. The lead singer and guitarist is Éric J. Goulet. The bass player is Nicolas Jouannaut. Olivier Rénaldin and Marc Chartrain have both played drums with the group.

== History ==
Goulet, Jouannaut and Rénaldin came together in 1997 to form Les Chiens. The band's album, Nuit Dérobée, was released in late 2000, to positive reviews.

Les Chiens was signed briefly to the labels La Tribu and C4, but most of their recordings were released independently.

In 2008, Les Chiens released an album, Le Long Sentier, on AudioGram. By this time Marc Chartrain was contributing the percussion.

In February, 2015, after a long hiatus, Les Chiens released a five-song EP, Les Chiens. In 2016, the group continues to perform and record.

== Discography ==
- 2000: Nuit Dérobée (October 10)
- 2002: Music-Hall 2001 (April 9)
- 2003: Debout (April 15)
- 2005: Rösk (September 20)
- 2008: Le Long Sentier
- 2015: Les Chiens mini-album

== See also ==
- Music of Canada
- Music of Quebec
- Canadian rock
- List of bands from Canada
