= Jiang (surname) =

Jiang / Chiang can be a Mandarin transliteration of one of several Chinese surnames:

1. Jiāng (surname 姜) (姜), appeared about 5,000 years ago, commonly spelled as Jiāng, Kang, Gang, Geung, Gung, Chiang, Keung, Keong, Kiang
2. Jiāng (surname 江) (江), appeared about 3,000 years ago, commonly spelled as Jiāng, Chiang, Gong, Kong, Kang, Kiang
3. Jiǎng (surname 蔣) (蔣), appeared about 3,000 years ago, commonly spelled as Jiǎng, Chiang, Cheung, Jang, Chioh
4. 強, commonly spelled as Jiàng, Gang, Geong, Geung, Khiang, Qiang, Chiang
