= Qian =

Qian may refer to:

- Cash (Chinese coin), a circular copper coin with a square hole in the center used from the 4th century BCE to the 20th century CE
- Guizhou, abbreviated as Qián (黔), province of China
- Mace (unit), or Qian, one of the Chinese units of measurement, equal to 5g
- Qian (hexagram), the first hexagram of the I Ching
- Qian (mass), a Chinese unit of weight (钱 / 錢)
- Qian (surname), a Chinese surname (钱 / 錢)
- Qian County, in Xianyang, Shaanxi, China
- Qian Mountains, mountain range in Northeast China
