= Xu (surname 徐) =

- Pronunciation: Xú (Mandarin); Chhî (Hokkien); Tshṳ̂ (Teochew); Từ (Vietnamese)
- Language: Mandarin Chinese

Origin
- Language: Chinese
- Meaning: slowly

Other names
- Variant forms: Xu, Hsu, Shyu (Mandarin); Chui, Tsui, Choi, Tsua (Cantonese); Zee (Wu Chinese); Sy, Djie, Tjhie, Chi, Tjie (Hakka); Su, Chi, Chee, Swee, Shui (Hokkien); Sher, Ser (Teochew)
- Derivative: Seo

Xu
- Chinese: 徐
Transcriptions
Standard Mandarin
- Hanyu Pinyin: Xú
Yue: Cantonese
- Jyutping: Ceoi^{4}
Southern Min
- Hokkien POJ: Chhî, Sû, Sîr
Middle Chinese
- Middle Chinese: *Zjwo

Xu (Chinese: 徐; pinyin: Xú; Wade–Giles: Hsü^{²}; Jyutping: Ceoi^{4}) is a Chinese-language surname. In the Wade-Giles system of romanization, it is spelled as "Hsu", which is commonly used in Taiwan or overseas Chinese communities. It is different from Xu (surname 許), represented by a different character. The surname originated from the state of Xú and is most common in Jiangsu province.

== Variations in other Chinese varieties and languages ==
In Wu Chinese including Shanghainese, the surname 徐 is transcribed as Zee, as seen in the historical place name Zikawei in Shanghai (Xujiahui in Pinyin). In Gan Chinese, it can be spelled Hi or Hé.

In Cantonese, 徐 is often transcribed as Tsui, T'sui, Choi, Chooi, Chui or even Tsua.

In modern Vietnamese, the character 徐 is written Từ and Sy when migrating to the English-speaking World, particularly the United States. Other spellings include Hee and Hu.

In Japanese, the surname 徐 is transliterated as Omomuro (kunyomi) or Jo (onyomi or Sino-Japanese).

In Korean, 徐 is romanized as Seo in the Revised Romanization of Korean and written 서 in Hangul.

== Origin ==
According to legend, Ruomu was one of the two sons of Boyi. Boyi successfully assisted Yu the Great with resolving the Flood, so the King conferred one of the eight noble tribal names, Yíng, to the family of Boyi; and simultaneously Ruomu was appointed as the King of the land of Xú. This was the beginning of the establishment of the state Xú. The state has been reigned over by the royal family for more than a thousand years, and had 44 monarchs.

The state of Xú was eliminated by the state of Wú, since then in order to commemorate their ancestral pride, descendants of King Ruo'mu adopted their country's name, Xú, as their surname. Therefore, the surname, Xú, is originated from King Ruo'mu, and it belongs to the noble tribe of Yíng.

The surename Xu also belongs to a branch of surename Zi.

Jiangsu is the province with the highest concentration of the surname Xu.

== Notable people with surname ==
- Abbey Hsu (born 2001), American basketball player
- Agnes Hsu-Tang, American archaeologist, art historian, and philanthropist
- Barbie Hsu (徐熙媛; 1976–2025), more commonly known as Dà S or Big S (大S), Taiwanese actress, singer, and television host
- Dee Hsu (徐熙娣; born 1978), more commonly known as Xiǎo S or Little S (小S), a Taiwanese television and film actress
- Stephen Hsu, American theoretical physicist and technology startup founder
- Hsu Cheng-kuang, Minister of Mongolian and Tibetan Affairs Commission of the Republic of China (2000–2002)
- Hsu Chen-wei (born 1968), county magistrate of Hualien Magistrate
- Hsu Ching-chung (徐慶鐘), Vice Premier of the Republic of China (1972–1981)
- Hsu Chun-yat, Minister of Public Construction Commission of the Republic of China (2014–2016)
- Hsu Jan-yau, Governor of Taiwan Province (2016–2017)
- Hsu Jo-ting, Taiwanese fencer
- Hsu Kuo-yung, Minister of the Interior of the Republic of China
- Hsu Li-teh, Vice Premier of the Republic of China (1993–1997)
- Hsu Ming-chun, Deputy Mayor of Kaohsiung (2016–2018)
- Hsu Ming-tsai, Mayor of Hsinchu City (2009–2014)
- Hsu Ming-yuan, Deputy Minister of Council of Indigenous Peoples
- Hsu Nai-lin (徐乃麟, born 1959), Taiwanese actor and comedian
- Hsu Shui-teh, President of Examination Yuan (1993–1996)
- Hsu Tsai-li, Mayor of Keelung City (2001–2007)
- Hsu Tzong-li, President of Judicial Yuan
- Hsu Yao-chang, Magistrate of Miaoli County
- Xu Huang, (徐晃; died 227), Military General of the state of Cao Wei
- Xu Sheng, Military General of the Eastern Wu
- Xu Shu (徐庶, fl. 207–220s), courtesy name Yuanzhi, originally named Shan Fu, official of the state of Cao Wei
- Xu Beihong (徐悲鴻; Wade–Giles: Hsü Pei-hung 1895 – 1953), also known as Ju Péon, prominent modern Chinese painter
- Xu Guangqi, Chinese scholar-bureaucrat, agricultural scientist, astronomer and mathematician
- Xu Jiyu, Chinese official and geographer
- Xu Bing, Artist
- Xu Chen, Badminton player
- Xu Da, Ming dynasty general
- Xu Datong, Chinese political scientist and legal scholar
- Xu Deshuai, a Hong Kong footballer for South China
- Xu Demei, Chinese javelin thrower
- Xu Jie (Ming dynasty), (1503–1583), 44th Senior Grand Secretary of the Ming dynasty
- Xu Jun, Chess player
- Xu Ling, Writer and editor
- Xu Linxia, Chinese communist executed by the Kuomintang
- Xu Lu (徐璐, born 1994), also known as Lulu Xu, Chinese actress
- Xu Mengjie, (徐梦洁, born 1994), also known as Rainbow Xu, Chinese singer and actress.
- Xu Minghao, (徐明浩, born 1997), Chinese member of the South Korean boyband Seventeen, known by his stage name The8
- Xu Xinfu, (徐欣夫), Chinese director
- Xu Wei, Ming dynasty painter
- Xu Xiangqian, Chinese Communist Military leader
- Xu Xinliu (Singloh Hsu), Chinese banker
- Xu Yang (Qing dynasty), Qing dynasty painter
- Xu Yifan (徐一幡; born 1988 in Tianjin), a Chinese tennis player
- Xu Yiyang (徐艺洋; born 1997), Chinese singer and actress
- Xu Yuan, Footballer
- Xu Zizhou (徐自宙; born 1981), Chinese former track and field sprinter
- Vivian Hsu (Atayal: Bidai Syulan; 徐若瑄; born 1975), Taiwanese singer and actress
- Tsui Hark (徐克, Vietnamese: Từ Khắc, born 1950), born Tsui Man-kong (徐文光), Hong Kong film director, producer and screenwriter
- Ophelia Tsui (徐崑翠), Chinese physicist
- Paula Tsui Siu-fung (徐小鳳), Cantopop singer in Hong Kong, with a career of spanning over 40 years
- Tsui Po Ko, renegade officer in the Hong Kong Police Force
- Tsui Tin-Chau, Teacher and lecturer
- Tsui Siu-Ming, Hong Kong-based actor, screenwriter, film producer, assistant director, and production manager
- Charlie Kosei (real name Cheui Gwongsing), Jazz musician
- Ban Tsui, Chinese Canadian Anesthesiologist
- Ted Hsu, Canadian politician
- Tsui Tsin-tong, Hong Kong entrepreneur, philanthropist and antique connoisseur
- Xu Bin (徐彬), Chinese actor based in Singapore
- Jeffrey Xu (徐鸣杰, born 1988 in Shanghai), Chinese actor in Singapore
- Xu Kaicheng (徐开骋, born 1990), Chinese actor
- Xu Xiaodong (徐晓冬; born 1979), nicknamed "Mad Dog", Chinese mixed martial artist (MMA) who has been called the founder of MMA in China
- Xu Can (徐灿; born 1994), Chinese professional boxer who has held the WBA (Regular) featherweight title since 2019
- Xu Jiao (徐娇, born 1997), Chinese actress
- Xu Shuzheng (徐樹錚, 1880–1925), Chinese warlord in Republican China, a subordinate and right-hand man of Duan Qirui of the Anhui clique
  - Hsu Dau-lin (1907–1973), legal scholar, son of Xu Shuzheng
- Eric Xu Yong (徐勇; born 1964), Chinese businessman, co-founder of Baidu
- Xu Dongdong (徐冬冬; born 1990), a Chinese actress and singer who first rose to prominence in 2016 for playing Shen Jiawen, a drug
- Xu Shouhui (徐壽輝; died 1360), a 14th-century Chinese rebel leader who proclaimed himself emperor during the late Mongol Yuan dynasty period
- Chee Soon Juan (徐顺全; born 1962), a Singaporean politician and the current leader of the Singapore Democratic Party (SDP)
- Xu Haiqiao (徐海喬; born 1983), also known as Joe Xu, a Chinese actor
- Xu Fan (徐帆, born 1967), Chinese actress and Asian Film Awards winner
- Empress Xu (Ming dynasty) (徐皇后, 1362 – 1407), the empress consort to the Yongle Emperor
- Xu Chen (徐晨, born 1984), a badminton player from China
- Xu Jinglei (徐静蕾, born 1974), Chinese actress and film director
- Xu Yiyang (徐艺洋, born 1997), Chinese singer and actress
- Xu Mengjie (徐梦洁, born 1994), Chinese singer and actress, former member of Rocket Girls 101
- Xu Fu (Hsu Fu; 徐福 or 徐巿, 255 BC – 195–155 BC.: pinyin: Xú Fú; Wade–Giles: Hsu2 Fu2; Japanese: 徐福 Jofuku or 徐巿 Jofutsu; Korean: 서복 Seo Bok or 서불 Seo Bul), a Qi alchemist and explorer
- Xu Shaohua (徐少华; born 1958), a Chinese actor best known for his role as Tang Sanzang
- Xu Huihui (徐慧慧, known professionally as Jade Xu) (born 1986), Chinese martial arts actress and multiple World Wushu Champion
- Xu Jie (Southern Tang) (Chinese: 徐玠; pinyin: Xú Jiè, 868–943), Southern Tang politician
- Xu Jie (Ming dynasty) (Chinese: 徐階; pinyin: Xú Jiē, 1503–1583), Ming dynasty politician
- Xu Jie (table tennis) (Chinese: 徐洁; pinyin: Xú Jié, born 1982), Chinese-Polish table tennis player
- Xu Xiake (徐霞客; 1587 – 1641), born Xu Hongzu (徐弘祖), courtesy name Zhenzhi (振之), Chinese travel writer and geographer of the Ming dynasty
  - Chinese barracks ship Xu Xiake
- Jeremy Tsui (Xu Zhengxi) (徐正溪, born 1985), Chinese actor
- Xu Geyang (徐歌阳; pinyin: Xú Gēyáng; born 1996), a singer from Shenyang, Liaoning, China
- Xu Zhimo born Xu Zhangxu, also known as Changhsu Hamilton Hsu (徐志摩; pinyin: Xú Zhìmó; 1897 – 1931), original name [(徐章垿; Wade–Giles: Hsü Chang-hsü), courtesy names Yousen (槱森; pinyin: Yǒusēn; Wade–Giles: Yu-sen) and later Zhimo, which he went by, an early 20th-century romantic Chinese poet
- Xu Xiang (徐翔; pinyin: Xú Xiáng; born February 1977 in Ningbo, Zhejiang), a former Chinese private placement investor
- Xu Jiayu (徐嘉余; born 1995), a Chinese competitive swimmer who specializes in the backstroke. He is the Olympic Silver medalist (2016
- Xu Caihou (徐才厚; 1943 – 2015), Chinese general in the People's Liberation Army (PLA)
- Xu Yunli (徐雲麗; born 1987), Chinese volleyball player
- Xu Lijia (徐莉佳; born 1987 in Shanghai), Chinese sailboat racer who won a bronze medal in women's Laser Radial class
- Xu Yunlong (徐雲龍; born 1979), Chinese former footballer
- Xu Zhijun (徐直军; born 1967), Chinese entrepreneur currently serving as deputy chairman and rotating chairman of the Huawei Technologies Co
- Xu Huaiji (徐怀冀; born 1989), Chinese former footballer
- Xu Huaiwen (徐怀雯; born 1975), Chinese-born German badminton player
- Xu Liang (徐亮; born 1981 in Shenyang), Chinese footballer
- Xu Ke (author) (徐珂; born 1869–1928), a Chinese author who wrote an "unofficial" history of the Qing dynasty, Qing bai lei chao
- Xu Yihai (徐亿海; born 1990), former Chinese footballer
- Xu Xin (footballer) (徐新; born 1994), Chinese footballer
- Xu Yanwei (徐妍玮; born 1984 in Shanghai), an Olympic medal-winning swimmer
- Xu Lingyi (徐令义; born April 1958), Chinese politician and the current Deputy Secretary of the Central Commission for Discipline Inspection
- Xu Wu (徐武; born 1991), Chinese football player who currently plays for Shaanxi Chang'an Athletic in the China League
- Xu Xianping (徐宪平; born 1954), Chinese politician
- Xu Zonghan (徐宗漢), a medical doctor, heroine of the Xinhai Revolution, which overthrew China's Qing dynasty in 1911
- Xu Yifan (徐一幡; born 1988 in Tianjin), tennis player from China
- Xu Gang (politician) (徐钢; born 1958), former Chinese official who spent most of his career in Fujian province
- Xu Zheng (actor) (徐崢; born 1972), Chinese actor and director best known for acting in comedic roles
- Xu Hui (徐惠; 627–650), female Chinese poet, "the first of all women poets of the Tang"
- Xu Youyu (徐友漁; born 1947 in Chengdu), Chinese scholar in philosophy
- Xu Xiaotu (徐晓图; born 1963 in Shanghai), 祖籍浙江 海宁, author, scholar, licensed architect in the US
- Xu Ming (徐明, 1971–2015), billionaire entrepreneur, former owner of Dalian Shide F.C.
- Xu Ming (figure skater) (徐铭, born 1981), Chinese figure skater
- Xu Datong (徐大同; 1928 – 2019), Chinese political scientist and legal scholar, considered one of China's "Five Elders"
- Ying Xu (徐鹰; pinyin: Xú Yīng) a computational biologist and bioinformatician
- Xu Jianyi (徐建一; born December 1953 in Fushan District, Yantai, Shandong), former Chinese politician and entrepreneur
- Xu Xu, aka Hsu Yu (徐訏), was the pen name of Xu Boyu (徐伯訏; 11 November 1908 – 5 October 1980), an important figure in modern Chinese literature
- Xu Caidong (徐采栋; 1919 – 2016), Chinese metallurgist, politician, and academician
- Xu Ming (徐铭; born 1981 in Qiqihar, Heilongjiang), Chinese figure skater
- Xu Shichang (Hsu Shih-chang; 徐世昌; 1855 – 1939), President of the Republic of China
- Xu Xing (paleontologist) (徐星; born 1969), Chinese paleontologist who has named more dinosaurs than any other living paleontologist
- Xu Yongchang (1885–1959) (Hsu Yung-chang; 徐永昌; style name: Cichen (Tzu-chen)), Minister of Board of Military Operations of the Republic of China
- Xu Kuangdi (徐匡迪; born 1937), Chinese politician and scientist, best known for his term as Mayor of Shanghai
- Xu Yunli (徐云丽; born 1987), Chinese volleyball player
- Xu Yihai (徐亿海; born 1990), former Chinese footballer
- Xu Shousheng (徐守盛; 1953–2020), Chinese politician who was the former Communist Party Secretary of Hunan and Gansu provinces
- Xu Mian (徐勉) (466–535), of the Liang dynasty
- Xu Shang (徐商), an official of the Chinese dynasty Tang dynasty
- Xu Aihui (徐爱辉; born 1978 in Heilongjiang), Chinese race walker
- Xu Teli (徐特立; 1877 – 1968), a politician of the People's Republic of China, the teacher of Mao Zedong etc.
- Xu Qian or George Hsu (徐謙; 1871–1940), a Chinese politician and scholar who made important contributions to the judicial system of modern China
- Xu Wu (徐武; born 1993), Chinese footballer who plays as a defender for Chongqing Lifan
- Xu Si (徐思, born 1998), Chinese professional snooker player
- Xu Xing (writer) (徐星；born 1956)
- Xu Qinan (徐芑南; born 1936), Chinese engineer and general designer of deep-sea research submersible Jiaolong
- Xu Feihong (徐飞洪) (born June 1964), Chinese diploma, the Ambassador of the People's Republic of China to Afghanistan
- Lala Hsu (徐佳瑩; born 1984), Taiwanese singer-songwriter
- Xu Lejiang (徐乐江; born 1959), a Chinese politician and former state-owned company executive
- Xu Fuguan (徐復觀); 1902/03 – 1982), a Chinese intellectual and historian who made notable contributions to Confucian studies
- Xu Sheng (徐盛, died c. 225), courtesy name Wenxiang, a military general serving under the warlord Sun Quan in the late Eastern Han dynasty
- Xu Jian (Tang dynasty) (徐堅; 659–729), Tang dynasty writer and official
- Xu Jian (softball) (徐健; born 1970), Chinese softball player
- Xu Changsheng (徐常胜), a Chinese computer scientist who is a professor at the Institute of Automation of the Chinese Academy of Sciences
- Madame Huarui or Consort Xu (徐惠妃) (c. 940 – 976), a concubine of Later Shu's emperor Meng Chang during imperial China's Five Dynasties and Ten Kingdoms period
- Xu Pu (徐溥, 1429–1499), a minister during the reign of the Ming dynasty Hongzhi Emperor
- Xu Chan (徐蕆), a 12th-century scholar, who wrote a preface to the 韻補 Yunbu of 吳域 Wu Yu (circa 1100–1154) in which he first proposed the xiesheng hypothesis
- Xu Wu (徐武; born 1991), a Chinese football player playing for Shaanxi Chang'an Athletic in the China League
- Xu Shaohua (politician) (徐少华; born January 1958), a politician of the People's Republic of China
- Xu Xiaobing (徐肖冰; 1916 – 2009), a Chinese cinematographer, filmmaker, and photojournalist
- Joseph Xu Zhixuan (徐之玄; 1916 – 2008), a Chinese Roman Catholic bishop of Roman Catholic Diocese of Chongqing, China
- Xu Zhongxing (徐中行; ? – 1578), a Chinese scholar-official of the Ming dynasty
- Xu Qiling (徐起零; born 1962), lieutenant general (zhongjiang) of the People's Liberation Army (PLA)
- Xu Yitian (徐一天; born 1947), a vice admiral (zhongjiang) of the People's Liberation Army Navy (PLAN) of China
- Xu Jian (softball) (徐健; pinyin: Xú Jiàn; born July 27, 1970), Chinese Olympic softball player
- Xu Liangcai (徐良才; born 1968), Chinese military officer currently serving as commander of the People's Liberation Army in Macao
- Xu Ming (徐铭; born 1981 in Qiqihar, Heilongjiang), Chinese figure skater
- Xu Guoliang (徐国良; born February 1965), Chinese molecular geneticist
- Xu Zihua (徐自华; 1873–1935), a Chinese poet
- Xu Shilin (徐诗霖; born 1998), Chinese tennis player
- Xu Huaizhong (徐怀中; 1929–2023), Chinese novelist. He is best known for his novel Qianfengji which won the 10th Mao Dun Literature Prize
- Xu Lin (born 1963) (徐麟; born 1963), Chinese politician, who serving as the director of the State Council Information Office
- Empress Dowager Xu (徐太后, personal name unknown) (died 926), during the reign of her husband Wang Jian, was an empress dowager of the Chinese Five Dynasties and Ten Kingdoms period state Former Shu
- Xu Guangchun (徐光春; 1944–2022), a retired Chinese politician who served as the Communist Party Secretary of Henan
- Xu Junping (徐俊平), senior colonel in the People's Liberation Army who defected to the United States in December 2000
- Xu Yougang (徐友刚; born 1996), a Chinese footballer who currently plays for Liaoning F.C. in the China League One
- Chee Hong Tat (徐芳达 born 1974), Singaporean politician
- Xu Zhen (Chinese 徐震 born 1977,), multimedia artist living and working in Shanghai, China
- Xu Rong (general) (徐榮; died 192), military general serving under the warlord Dong Zhuo
- Xu Rong (badminton) (徐蓉; born 1958), retired female badminton player from China
- Augusta Xu-Holland (徐嘉雯; born 1991), Chinese New Zealand actress
- Xu Ping (徐苹; born 1960s?), penname: Xu Yigua (须一瓜), a Chinese writer based in Xiamen
- Xu Lai (actress) (徐来; Wade–Giles: Hsü Lai; 1909 – 1973), a Chinese film actress, socialite, and World War II secret agent
- Xu Fulin (徐傅霖; 1879 – 1958), a politician and legal scholar of the Republic of China
- Xu Bing (徐冰; born 1955), Chinese artist who served as vice-president of the Central Academy of Fine Arts
- Xu Zhongyu (徐中玉; 1915 – 2019), Chinese writer and literary scholar
- Xu Guoping (徐郭平; born 1962), a Chinese politician who served as the mayor of Taizhou of the Jiangsu Province
- Xu Wen (徐溫, 862 – 927, ancestry Qushan (朐山, in modern Lianyungang, Jiangsu), major general and regent of the Chinese Five Dynasties and Ten Kingdoms period state Wu
- Li Bian (889–943), born Xu Gao (徐誥), founder of Southern Tang
- Li Jing (Southern Tang) (916–961), Southern Tang emperor (937–939), originally Xu Jingtong (徐景通), briefly Xu Jing (徐璟)
- Xu Jing (table tennis) (徐竞; born 1968), Chinese-Taiwanese table tennis player
- Xu Jing (archer) (徐晶; born 1990), Chinese archer
- Xu You (Southern Tang) (徐游; c. 960 – ?)
- Xu Xianqing (徐顯卿; 1537–1602), courtesy name Gongwang (公望), pseudonym Jian'an (檢庵), Chinese statesman
- Jake Hsu (徐鈞浩; born 1990), Taiwanese actor
- Xu Genbao (徐根宝; born 1944 in Shanghai), Chinese football manager
- Xu Lin (born 1963) (徐麟), head of the Cyberspace Administration of China
- Xu Chi (徐迟; 1914 – 1996), Chinese writer, modernist poet and essayist in his early life, later working as a journalist
- Xu Xingye (徐兴业; 917 – 1990), Chinese novelist
- Princess Xu Zhaopei (徐昭佩) (died 549), an imperial princess of the Chinese Liang dynasty
- Leetsch C. Hsu or Xu Lizhi (徐利治; 1920–2019), Chinese mathematician
- Lap-Chee Tsui or Xu Lizhi (徐立之; born 1950), Chinese-Canadian geneticist
- Xu Gang (cyclist) (徐刚; born 1984)
- Xu Fancheng (徐梵澄; 1909–2000), also known as Hu Hsu and F.C. Hsu in India, a Chinese scholar and translator, indologist and philosopher
- T.C. Hsu (徐道覺; 1917–2003), Chinese American cell biologist
- Xu Wen (footballer) (徐文), born April 13, 1986, in Shanghai), a versatile Chinese footballer, who plays as either a defensive midfielder or defender
- Xu Haidong (徐海東; 1900 – 1970), senior general in the People's Liberation Army of China
- Xu Xiaoxi (徐小溪; born 1981 in Chengdu), Chinese film director and screenwriter
- Xu Xiangqian (徐向前 1901 – 1990), Chinese Communist military leader and one of the Ten Marshals of the People's Liberation Army
- Hsu Ming-yuan (徐明淵), a politician in the Republic of China who currently serves as the Deputy Minister of the Council of Indigenous Peoples of the Executive Yuan
- Xu Xi (painter) (徐熙; died before 975), Chinese painter in the Southern Tang kingdom during the Five Dynasties and Ten Kingdoms period
- Su Guaning (徐冠林; born 1951), a Singaporean academic and the President Emeritus of Nanyang Technological University (NTU)
- Xu Kecheng (徐克成"; born 1940), Chinese specialist in gastroenterology, hepatology and cancer treatment and president of Guangzhou Fuda Cancer Hospital
- Xu Da (徐達; 1332–1385), courtesy name Tiande, a Chinese military general who lived in the late Yuan dynasty and early Ming dynasty
- Xu Ze (徐泽; 1954), Chinese politician from Shantou, Guangdong
- Xu Zheng (Eastern Wu) (徐整), an Eastern Wu official and a Daoist author of the "Three Five Historic Records"
- Xu Xianzhi (徐羨之) (364–426), high-level official of the Chinese dynasty Liu Song
- Xu Yuanquan (徐源泉; Hsü Yüan-ch'üan; 1886–1960), a Kuomintang general
- Xu Guangxian (徐光宪; 1920 – 2015), also known as Kwang-hsien Hsu, a Chinese chemist
- Xu Yixin (徐以新) (1911–1994), an associate of the 28 Bolsheviks
- Xu Enzeng (徐恩曾) (1896–1985), Republic of China politician born in Wuxing, Huzhou, Zhejiang Province
- Xu Gan (徐幹; 171–218), courtesy name Weichang, a philosopher and poet of the late Eastern Han dynasty of China
- Hsu Yung-ming (徐永明; born 1966), Taiwanese political scientist, pollster, and politician
- Hsu Chih-ming (徐志明; born 1957), a Taiwanese politician who attended primary school in Daliao, Kaohsiung
- Shu Shien-Siu (徐賢修; 1912–2001), also known as S. S. Shu, a Chinese/Taiwanese mathematician, engineer and educator
- Xu Xusheng (徐旭生 1888 – January 4, 1976), also known by his courtesy name Xu Bingchang, was a Chinese archaeologist, historian, and explorer
- Xu Jingqian (徐景遷) (919–937), also known in some historical records as Li Jingqian (李景遷) (because his family would, after his death, change the surname to Li), posthumously honored as Prince Ding of Chu (楚定王), an official of the Chinese Five Dynasties and Ten Kingdoms period state Wu
- Hsu Hsin-ying (徐欣瑩; born 1972), Taiwanese politician of the KMT
- Xu Dunxin (徐敦信) (born 1934), Chinese diplomat born in Yangzhou, Jiangsu
- Francis Hsu Chen-Ping (徐诚斌; 1920 – 23 May 1973), a Chinese clergyman
- Hsu Chen-wei (徐榛蔚; pinyin: Xú Zhēnwèi; born 12 October 1968), Taiwanese politician
- Xu Yulan (徐玉蘭; 1921 – 2017) born Wang Yulan (汪玉蘭), a Yue opera singer-actress who plays Sheng roles (all male characters)
- Xu Wan (徐綰; died 902), a general during the late Tang dynasty who served and later turned against the warlord Qian Liu
- Yuki Hsu (born 1978), Taiwanese singer and actress
- Tsui Sze-man (徐四民; 1914 – 2007), a pro-Beijing loyalist and magazine publisher based in Hong Kong
- Xu Yongjiu (徐永久; born 1964), Chinese former racewalking athlete
- Shyu Jong-shyong (徐中雄; born 1957), Taiwanese politician
- Heidi Shyu (徐若冰; born 1953), Taiwan-born United States Assistant Secretary of the Army for Acquisition, Logistics, and Technology
- Norman Hsu (徐詠芫 born 1951), a convicted pyramid investment promoter who associated himself with the apparel industry
- Teddy Zee (徐俠昌), a Chinese film producer/executive whose films (produced and supervised by him) have amassed over $2.6 billion in revenue
- Hsu Szu-chien (徐斯儉), Deputy Minister of Foreign Affairs of the Republic of China since 16 July 2018
- Charles Sew Hoy, Choie Sew Hoy (徐肇開; 1836–1901), also known as Charles Sew Hoy, a notable New Zealand merchant, Chinese leader and gold-dredger
- Xu Guoqing (徐国清; born 1958), Chinese judoka
- Shyu Jyuo-min (徐爵民), an engineer and politician in the Republic of China
- Hsu Feng (徐楓 born 1950), Taiwanese-born actress and film producer
- Chee Kim Thong (徐金棟; 1920–2001), Shaolin martial arts grandmaster
- Xu Zhilei (徐志雷, born April 16, 1988), known by his in-game tag BurNIng, Chinese professional gamer who plays Dota 2
- John Hsu (徐漢強), Taiwanese film director
- Hsu Jui-te (徐瑞德, born 1964), Taiwanese former cyclist who competed in two events at the 1988 Summer Olympics
- Tsui Tin-Chau (徐天就, born 1958 in Hong Kong) (ancestry: Guangdong, Zhongshan), Chinese-born Dutchman who is well known in the Chinese community in the Netherlands
- Anthony Zee (徐一鸿, b. 1945), a Chinese-American physicist, writer
- Che Chew Chan (徐萩玹, born 1982 in Pontian, Johor), Malaysian taekwondo practitioner
- Tsui Chi Ho (徐志豪; born 1990), Hong Kong sprinter
- Ding Yi (丁一; 1927 – 2019), Chinese electrical engineer and business executive, born in June 1927 as Xu Weiwen (徐纬文), in Penglai, Shandong
- Xu Yang (徐洋, born 1987 in Shandong), Chinese professional football player
- Li Jingsui (920–958), born Xu Jingsui (徐景遂), prince of Southern Tang
- Tsui Po-ko (徐步高) (1970–2006), police constable in the Hong Kong Police Force
- Lap-Chee Tsui, (徐立之; born 1950), Chinese-born Canadian geneticist and President of the University of Hong Kong
- Hsu Yao-chang (徐耀昌; born 1955), Taiwanese politician
- Ciputra (Tjie Tjin Hoan), (1931–2019), Indonesian businessman
- Fei Xu (徐绯; born 1969), Chinese-born American developmental psychologist and cognitive scientist
- Xu Ziyin (徐紫茵; born 1996), Chinese singer, dancer, and actress
- Wenyuan Xu (徐文渊) Chinese computer scientist
- Xu Zhuoyi (徐卓; born 2003), Chinese sprinter
- Xu Ping （徐平；born 1971）, Professor, Double PhDs, CEO of Lanmei Eco Tech Group (Singapore), Alumnus of Oxford University etc.
- Zhen Xu (徐蓁), Chinese-American biomedical engineer
- Xu Ruixia (徐睿霞; born 1968), Chinese politician

== Fictional characters ==
- Xu Ning (徐寧), in Water Margin
- Xu Qing (徐慶), from the 19th-century Chinese novels The Seven Heroes and Five Gallants and The Five Younger Gallants
- Xu Shang-Chi (徐尚氣), portrayed by Simu Liu in the Marvel Cinematic Universe multimedia franchise, based on the Marvel Comics character of the same name
- Colonel James Hsu, in Fallout: New Vegas

== See also ==
- Seo (Korean surname)
- Từ (Vietnamese name)
- Shyu (disambiguation)
