= Tsui =

- Language: Chinese

Origin
- Derivation: Toponymic

Other names
- Variant forms: 崔: Cui, Chui; 徐: Xu, Hsu, Chui

Tsui is a surname. It is an alternative transcription of two Chinese surnames, namely Cuī (崔) and Xú (徐).

== Origins ==
Tsui may be an alternative transliteration of two separate Chinese surnames, listed below by their Hanyu Pinyin transliteration (which reflects the Mandarin pronunciation):

- Cuī (崔), which originated as a toponymic surname from a fief by that name in the state of Qi; a grandson of Jiang Ziya renounced his claim to the throne and went to live in that fief, and his descendants took its name as their surname. It is spelled Ts'ui^{4} in the Wade–Giles system of transliterating Mandarin (which remains common in Taiwan and was used elsewhere until the mid-to-late 20th century). The spelling Tsui may also be based on the Cantonese pronunciation (Jyutping: Ceoi1; Cantonese Yale: Chēui).
- Xú (徐), which originated as a toponymic surname from the ancient state of Xu, adopted by the descendants of Boyi after the state was annexed by the state of Chu. The spelling Tsui is based on its Cantonese pronunciation (Jyutping: Ceoi4; Cantonese Yale: Chèuih); it is nearly homophonous with the above surname in Cantonese aside from the differing tone.

== Statistics ==
The 2010 United States census found 3,168 people with the surname Tsui, making it the 10,180th-most-common name in the country. This represented an increase from 2,725 (10,748th-most-common) in the 2000 Census. In both censuses, more than nine-tenths of the bearers of the surname identified as Asian, and roughly two percent as White.

== People ==
=== Academics ===
- Daniel C. Tsui (崔琦; born 1939), Henan-born American physicist
- Amy Tsui (born 1949), American demographer
- Lap-Chee Tsui (徐立之; born 1950), Shanghai-born Canadian geneticist
- Tsui Tin-Chau (徐天就; born 1958), Hong Kong-born Dutch teacher
- Ban Tsui (徐志豪; born 1963), Hong Kong-born Canadian Anesthesiologist
- Anne S. Tsui (fl. 1970s–present), Shanghai-born American business professor
- Tsui Ming-sum (fl. 1980s–2010s), Hong Kong social scientist
- Kennie Tsui (fl. 2016–present), New Zealand chemical engineer

=== Athletes ===
- Tsui Hsiu-li (崔秀里; born 1973), Taiwanese table tennis player
- Tsui Fang-hsuan (born 1984), Taiwanese taekwondo practitioner
- Tsui Wan Yi (born 1984), Hong Kong fencer
- Tsui Chi Ho (徐志豪; born 1990), Hong Kong sprinter
- Tsui Wang Kit (徐宏傑; born 1997), Hong Kong footballer

=== Entertainment industry ===
- Tsui Hsiao-ping (崔小萍; 1923–2017), Jinan-born radio personality in Taiwan
- Tsui Fu-sheng (崔福生; 1931–2013), Taiwanese actor
- Tsui Ping (崔萍; 1938–20??), Harbin-born Mandarin-language pop singer in Hong Kong
- Paula Tsui (徐小鳳; born 1949), Hong Kong singer
- Tsui Hark (徐克; born 1950), Hong Kong film director
- Tsui Siu-ming (徐小明; born 1953), Hong Kong actor
- Elvis Tsui (徐錦江; born 1961), Hong Kong actor
- Yvette Tsui (崔麗心; born 1963), Taiwanese television host
- Tsui Wing (徐榮; born 1974), Hong Kong actor
- Kate Tsui (徐子珊; born 1979), Hong Kong actress
- Roy Tsui (徐家豪; born 1980), Hong Kong lyricist
- Jeremy Tsui (徐正溪; born 1985), Chinese actor
- Sam Tsui (born 1989), American singer-songwriter
- Harrison Tsui (born 1995), Hong Kong fashion photographer

=== Politics and government ===
- Tsui Kwo Yin (崔國因; 1831–1909), Qing diplomat
- Tsui Po-ko (徐步高; 1970–2006), Hong Kong policetable
- Caspar Tsui (徐英偉; born 1977), Hong Kong politician
- Tsui Shung-yiu (fl. 1970s–2000s), Hong Kong civil servant
- Tori Tsui (fl. 2015–present), Hong Kong climate activist

=== Other ===
- Tsui Sze-man (徐四民; 1914–2007), Burmese-born Hong Kong magazine publisher
- Tsui Tsin-tong (徐展堂; 1941–2010), Hong Kong businessman
- Kitty Tsui (born 1952), Hong Kong-born American writer and stage actor
- Eugene Tssui (崔悅君; born Eugene Tsui, 1954), American architect
- Tsui Teh-li (崔德禮; fl. 1990s), member of the executive board of the Boy Scouts of China
- Christopher Tsui (born 1981), Hong Kong-born British businessman and racehorse owner

== See also ==
- Hui (surname), the Cantonese spelling of another surname transcribed as Xǔ in Pinyin (許)
