= Chui =

- Language: Chinese

Origin
- Derivation: Toponymic

Other names
- Variant forms: 崔: Cui, Tsui; 徐: Xu, Hsu, Tsui

Chui is a surname.

== Origins ==
Chui is a spelling of the Cantonese pronunciation of two Chinese surnames, listed below by their Pinyin transcription (which reflects the Mandarin pronunciation):

- Cuī (崔), which originated as a toponymic surname from a fief by that name in the state of Qi; a grandson of Jiang Ziya renounced his claim to the throne and went to live in that fief, and his descendants took its name as their surname. (Cantonese pronunciation – Jyutping: Ceoi1; Cantonese Yale: Chēui)
- Xú (徐), which originated as a toponymic surname from the ancient state of Xu, adopted by the descendants of Boyi after the state was annexed by the state of Chu. (Cantonese pronunciation – Jyutping: Ceoi4; Cantonese Yale: Chèuih).

== Statistics ==
According to statistics cited by Patrick Hanks, there were 267 people on the island of Great Britain and 12 on the island of Ireland with the surname Chui as of 2011. There had been one person with that surname in Great Britain in 1881.

The 2010 United States census found 1,420 people with the surname Chui, making it the 19,138th-most-common name in the country. This represented an increase from 1,303 (19,248th-most-common) in the 2000 Census. In both censuses, more than nine-tenths of the bearers of the surname identified as Asian, and roughly two percent as White.

== People ==
=== Surname 崔 ===
- Chui Sai Cheong (崔世昌; born 1954), Macau politician, older brother of Fernando Chui
- Fernando Chui (崔世安; born 1957), second chief executive of Macau
- Anita Chui (崔碧珈; born 1988), Hong Kong actress
- Vincent Chui (崔允信), Hong Kong film director

=== Surname 徐 ===
- Chui A-poo (徐亞保; died 1851), Chinese pirate
- Norman Chui (徐少強; born 1950), Hong Kong actor
- Alan Chui Chung-San (徐忠信; 1952–2022), Hong Kong actor
- Chui Chi-kin (徐子見; born 1967), Hong Kong politician
- Chui Tien-you (徐天佑; born 1983), Hong Kong actor

=== Other or unknown ===
- Nelson Oswaldo Chui Mejía (born 1947), Peruvian politician
- Mathieu Ngudjolo Chui (born 1970), Congolese army colonel

== See also ==
- Hui (surname), the Cantonese spelling of another surname transcribed as Xǔ in Pinyin (許)
