= Anand Sivasubramaniam =

Indian computer science and engineering professor (born 1967)

- Born: 1967 (age 58–59); Chennai, India
- Education: Georgia Institute of Technology; IIT Madras
- Awards: IEEE Fellow (2012); ACM Fellow (2017); National Academy of Inventors Fellow (2024); Penn State Distinguished Professor (2017); National Science Foundation CAREER Award (1997)
- Scientific career
- Fields: Computer architecture, computer systems, performance evaluation, datacenters, power management
- Workplaces: Penn State University
- Doctoral advisor: Umakishore Ramachandran
- Doctoral students: Yanyong Zhang; Aniruddha S. Vaidya; Murali Vilayannur; Youngjae Kim; Morteza Ramezani; Haibo Zhang; Shulin Zhao
- Website: www.cse.psu.edu/~axs53

Anand Sivasubramaniam is Distinguished Professor of Computer Science and Engineering at The Pennsylvania State University. He is well known for his work in computer architecture, computer systems, data centers and computer systems power management.

== Education ==
Anand did his schooling at Padma Seshadri Bala Bhavan, Nungambakkam, Chennai. He graduated All India 1st in the All India Senior School Certificate Examination in 1985.

Anand completed his BTech from the Indian Institute of Technology, Madras in 1989 and earned his PhD from Georgia Tech in 1995 with Umakishore Ramachandran as his doctoral adviser. He has been faculty at Penn State since 1995.

== Awards and honors ==
Anand received the National Science Foundation CAREER Award in 1997. He received the Penn State Department of Computer Science and Engineering Faculty Teaching award in 2003. He has received multiple IBM Faculty Research awards, Google Research awards and an HP innovation award. He was elected an IEEE Fellow in 2012 “for contributions to power management of storage systems and high performance computer systems” and the ACM Fellow in 2017 "for contributions to power management of datacenters and high-end computer systems". In 2024, he was inducted as a Fellow of the National Academy of Inventors (NAI).

== Teaching ==
Anand teaches undergrad and graduate level operating systems CMPSC 473 and CSE 511.
