= Collected Statutes of the Ming Dynasty =

Ming Chinese law books

The Collected Statutes of the Ming Dynasty or Collected Regulations of the Great Ming (simplified Chinese: 大明会典; traditional Chinese: 大明會典; pinyin: Dà Míng Hùidǐan) is a five-volume collection of regulations and procedures of the Ming dynasty (1368–1644). After the original compiler, Xu Pu (1429–1499), died, the task was taken over by Li Dongyang (1447–1516) and Shen Shixing (申時行). The books took 11 years to complete and were published in 1509.

A second edition was commissioned in 1576, resulting in the alternative name Wanli Huidian (萬曆會典), which was completed in 1587 and covers the years between 1479 and 1584 under the era name Wanli. The 1587 edition was reproduced as a facsimile in Beijing by the Zhonghua Book Company in 1988.

== See also ==
- Great Ming Code
