= Hui (surname) =

- Language: Chinese

Other names
- Variant forms: 惠: Wai; 回: Wui; 許: Xu, Kho; 費: Fei, Fai

Hui is a surname. It is the Hanyu Pinyin spelling of two Chinese surnames (惠 and 回), as well as a variant spelling of two others (許 Xǔ and 費 Fèi).

== Origins ==
=== Surname Huì (惠) ===
The Chinese character used to write this surname means "favour" or "benefit". It is the 204th surname in the traditional poem Hundred Family Surnames. The Mingxian Shizu Yanxing Leigao section of the Siku Quanshu encyclopedia states that this surname was adopted from the posthumous name of King Hui of Zhou (676–651 BC). The descendants who adopted the surname settled in Jiangsu and Zhejiang provinces. During the Qing Dynasty, some Manchu people also adopted this surname.

In Sino-Korean pronunciation, this character is read Hye. It is not used as a surname in modern Korea, but can be found as an element of Korean given names. In Sino-Vietnamese pronunciation, it is read Huệ.

=== Surname Huí (回) ===
The Chinese character used to write this surname means "return". It does not appear in Hundred Family Surnames. Sources published during the Song dynasty, including the Guangyun dictionary, Xingjie, the section "Given Names Used as Surnames" (以名為氏) in the Tongzhi encyclopedia, and Gujin Xingshi Shu Bianzheng, state three origins for this surname:

1. It was originally the personal name of Fang Hui (方回), an official who served under Emperor Yao
2. It was originally the personal name of Wu Hui (吳回), a son of the legendary Zhurong. Wu Hui's son Sun later took Hui as his surname.
3. It is found as a surname among the Hui people (whose ethnonym is written with the same character). However, the sources do not explain its origin.

In Sino-Korean pronunciation, this character is read Hoe. It is not used as a surname in modern Korea, and only rarely as an element of given names. In Sino-Vietnamese pronunciation, it is read Hồi.

=== Other ===
Hui may be the spelling of two other Chinese surnames, based on their pronunciation in different varieties of Chinese; they are listed below by their spelling in Hanyu Pinyin, which reflects the Mandarin Chinese pronunciation:

- Xǔ (traditional Chinese: 許; simplified Chinese: 许), spelled Hui based on its Cantonese pronunciation (Jyutping: Hoei2; Cantonese Yale: Héui)
- Fèi (traditional Chinese: 費; simplified Chinese: 费), spelled Hui based on its pronunciation in various Southern Min dialects, e.g. Teochew (Peng'im: hui⁵; IPA: /hui²¹³/)

== Statistics ==
According to reports in 2014, the surname Huì (惠) meaning "favour" was the 262nd-most-common surname in mainland China. It had roughly 298,000 bearers, primarily in Shaanxi, Henan, Shandong, and Jiangsu.

According to statistics cited by Patrick Hanks, there were 581 people on the island of Great Britain and 34 on the island of Ireland with the surname Hui as of 2011. There were no people with the surname on the island of Great Britain in 1881.

The 2010 United States census found 5,768 people with the surname Hui, making it the 5,966th-most-common name in the country. This represented an increase from 5,282 (6,003rd-most-common) in the 2000 Census. In both censuses, more than nine-tenths of the bearers of the surname identified as Asian. It was the 228th-most-common surname among respondents to the 2000 Census who identified as Asian.

== People ==
=== Surname Huì (惠) ===
- Hui Shi (惠施; 370–310 BCE), Chinese philosopher
- Hui Yuyu (惠浴宇; 1909–1989), Chinese politician, delegate to the first through third National People's Congresses
- Kara Hui (惠英紅; born 1960), Hong Kong actress
- Hui Jun (惠钧; born 1963), Chinese table tennis player
- Cang Hui (惠蒼; born 1977), Chinese mathematician in South Africa
- Hui Zicheng (惠子程; born 1989), Chinese sports shooter
- Hui Jiakang (惠家康; born 1989), Chinese football midfielder
- Hui Ruoqi (惠若琪; born 1991), Chinese volleyball player
- Hui Xirui (惠夕蕊; born 1994), Chinese badminton player

=== Surname Huí (回) ===
- Hui Liangyu (回良玉; born 1944), Chinese politician, vice-premier from 2003 to 2013

=== Surname Xǔ (許) ===
- Michael Hui (許冠文; born 1942), Hong Kong comedian
- Ann Hui (許鞍華; born 1947), Hong Kong film director
- Rafael Hui (許仕仁; born 1948), Hong Kong government official, Chief Secretary for Administration (2005–2007)
- Sam Hui (許冠傑; born 1948), Hong Kong singer
- Hui Shiu-hung (許紹雄; born 1948), Hong Kong actor
- Herman Hui (許宗盛; born 1951), Hong Kong businessman and Scout Movement member
- Hui Lin Chit (許連捷; born c. 1952), Chinese businessman who co-founded Hengan International
- Lap Shun Hui (許立信; born 1951), Chinese-born American technology entrepreneur
- Hui So Hung (許素虹; born 1958), Hong Kong table tennis player
- Raman Hui (許誠毅; born 1963), Hong Kong animator and film director
- Steve Hui Chun-tak (許鎮德; born 1963), Hong Kong Police Force spokesman
- Vico Hui (許浩略; born c. 1965), Hong Kong businessman and former Birmingham City F.C. chairman
- Andy Hui (許志安; born 1967), Hong Kong singer
- Hui Chak Bor (許澤波; born 1968), Hong Kong cyclist
- Florence Hui (許曉暉; born 1974), Hong Kong government official, Undersecretary for Home Affairs (2008–2017)
- Christopher Hui (許正宇; born 1976), Hong Kong government official, Secretary for Financial Services and the Treasury since 2020
- John Hui (tennis) (許建業; born 1978), Hong Kong tennis player
- Ted Hui (許智峯; born 1982), Hong Kong Democratic Party politician
- Alfred Hui (許廷鏗; born 1988), Hong Kong singer
- Hui Ka Lok (許嘉樂; born 1994), Hong Kong football winger
- Hui Wang Fung (許宏鋒; born 1994), Hong Kong football forward
- Hui Chiu-yin (許招賢), Hong Kong businessman, director of First Ferry

=== Other or unknown ===
- Ka Kwong Hui (1922–2003), Chinese-born American potter and ceramist
- Roger Hui (1953–2021), Hong Kong-born Canadian computer scientist
- Hui Cheong (born 1956), Hong Kong sprint canoer
- Melissa Hui (born 1966), Hong Kong-born Canadian composer
- Vatau Hui (born 1970), Tongan politician
- Alexandra Hui (born 1980), American historian of science and sound
- Phil Hui (born 1987), American poker player
- Justin Hui (born 1998), Singaporean footballer
