= Yanyong Zhang =

Chinese computer scientist

Yanyong Zhang (Chinese: 张燕咏) is a Chinese computer scientist whose interests include the security and privacy of wireless sensor networks, edge computing, and the internet of things. She is a professor in the School of Computer Science at the University of Science and Technology of China.

== Education and career ==
Zhang was an undergraduate at the University of Science and Technology of China, where she earned a bachelor's degree in computer science in 1997. She went to the Pennsylvania State University for graduate study in computer science and engineering, completing her Ph.D. there in 2002. Her doctoral dissertation, Scheduling and Resource Management for Next Generation Clusters, was supervised by Anand Sivasubramaniam.

She joined the Rutgers University Department of Electrical & Computer Engineering as an assistant professor in 2002, and was promoted to associate professor in 2008 and full professor in 2015, before returning to the University of Science and Technology of China as a professor in 2018. Her students at Rutgers included Wenyuan Xu.

== Recognition ==
Zhang was named as an IEEE Fellow, in the 2018 class of fellows, "for contributions to robust and efficient large-scale sensor networks".
