= Shyu (disambiguation) =

Shyu is the Gwoyeu Romatzyh romanization of the Chinese surname Xú (徐). People with this surname include:

- Heidi Shyu (徐若冰; Xú Ruòbīng; born 1953), American engineer and Department of Defense official
- Shyu Jong-shyong (徐中雄; Xú Zhōngxióng; born 1957), Taiwanese politician, Deputy Secretary-General of the Executive Yuan
- Shyu Jyuo-min (徐爵民; Xú Juémín; fl. 1977–present), Taiwanese engineer and politician, Minister of Science and Technology
- Jen Shyu (徐秋雁; Xú Qiūyàn; born 1978), American jazz musician
- Mei-Ling Shyu, computer scientist
