= Tang Standing Horse figure, Canberra =

Chinese tomb figure

Standing Horse
- Artist: Unknown
- Year: 618 – 907 C.E.
- Type: Tang dynasty tomb figures
- Medium: Sancai
- Dimensions: Side view 73.7 h x 85.0 w x 25.0 d cm
- Location: National Gallery of Australia; Canberra
- Accession: NGA 95.587
- Website: https://artsearch.nga.gov.au/Detail.cfm?IRN=5281

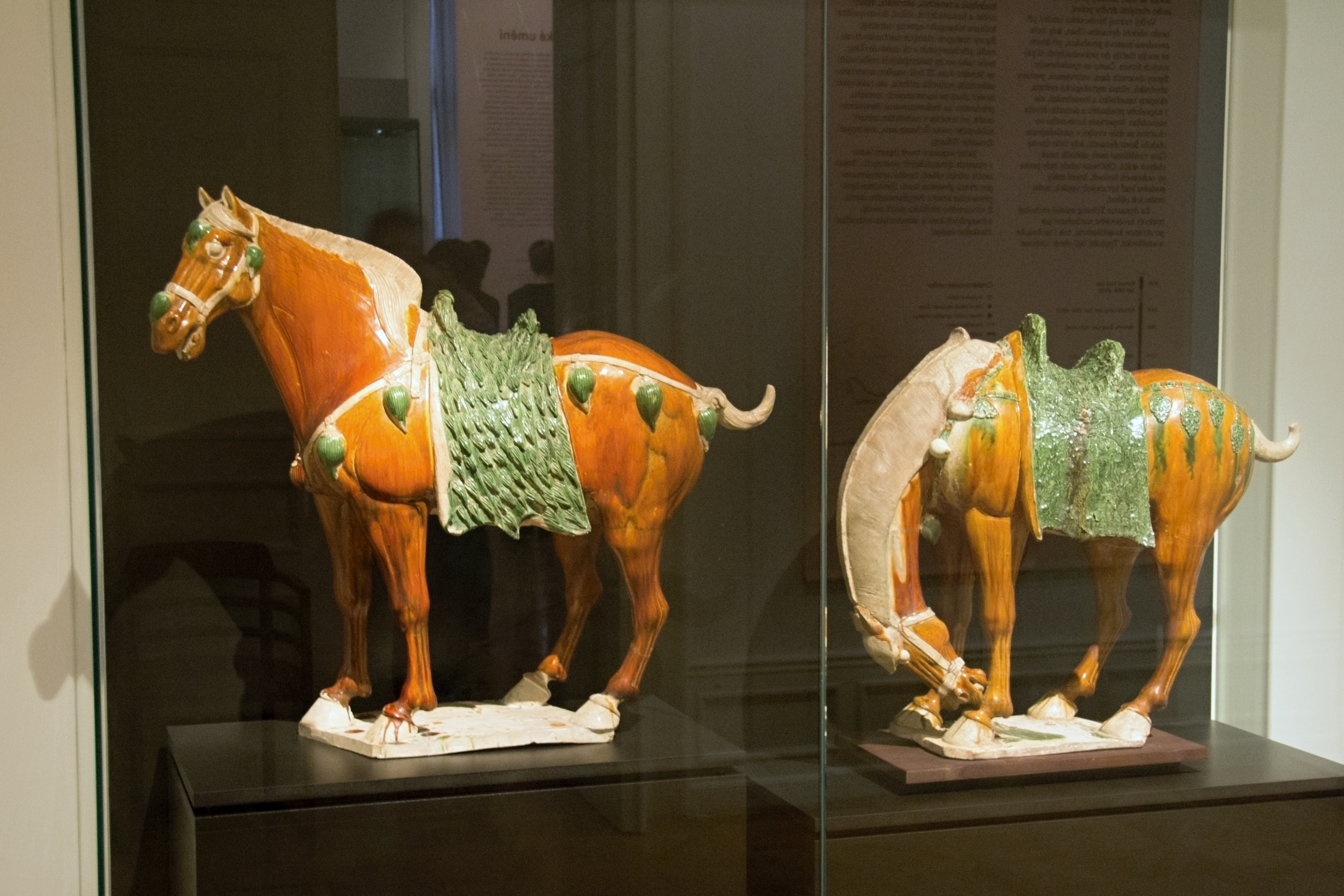
Two figurines in Prague, depicting Ferghana horses and glazed with the Sancai glaze. The one on the left is very similar to the Canberra horse.

Standing Horse is an example of the Tang dynasty tomb figures created for important burials during the Tang dynasty in China. In these large numbers of tomb figurines and other artefacts were designed specifically to be buried with the deceased in large burial mounds. This large figurine features the use of Sancai, a glazing technique popular during the Tang dynasty.

== Form, material and technique ==
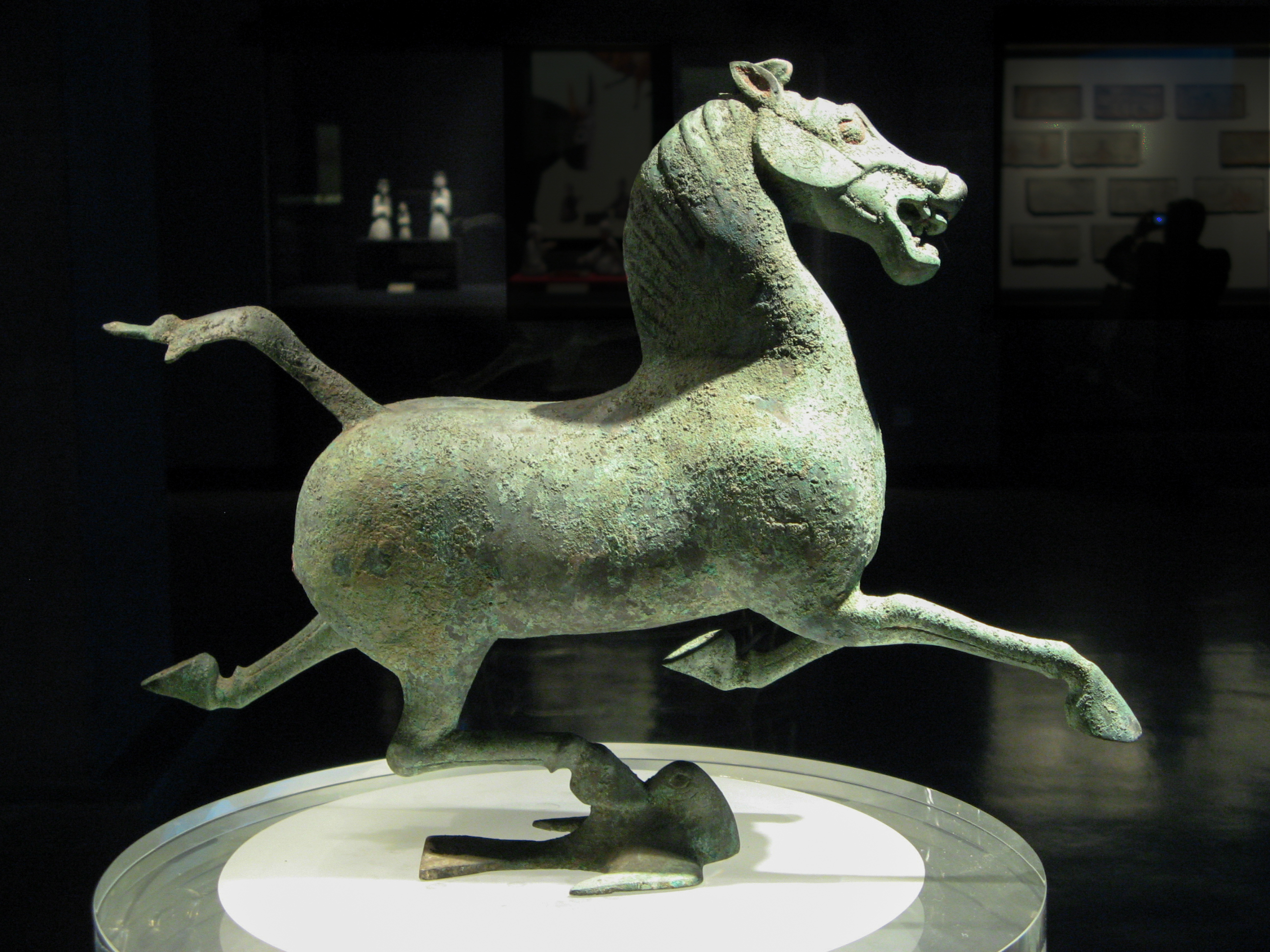
Gansu Flying Horse, Han dynasty, made of bronze.

The form of this sculpture appears to be harmoniously symmetrical at first glance. However, on further scrutiny, it is clear that the shape of the sculpture is deeply organic, revealing a varied contour of curves and edges. When a spotlight is shone on the sculpture, deep pockets of shadows on the sculpture contrast starkly with illuminating highlights that reflect off its shiny, glazed surface.

As a historical artefact that is more than 1000-year-old, it is very well-preserved. It was created in fired earthenware, which is a durable material. Bronze and wood were 2 other materials commonly used to create sculptures and tomb artefacts in this period and region. However, earthenware was a more practical material for tomb artefacts because it was more affordable than bronze, and more durable than wood.

The Sancai technique literally means ‘three colours’. However, the colours of the glazes were not limited to three in number. This technique is especially associated with the Tang Dynasty. The Sancai glaze is highly durable – most ceramics glazed with this technique has endured till today. The use of Sancai glazing on figures was expensive and required skilful craftsmanship. Sumptuary laws also restricted the usage of Sancai glaze to the upper classes, and production was controlled by the imperial bureaucracy.

Short video of a sancai tomb guardian.

== Iconographical analysis ==
An iconography of a work of art is the analysis of the visual images and symbols employed.

As an expressional subject matter, this figurine of a horse is depicted proportionally and realistically, with great attention paid to its anatomical accuracy, colour treatment, texture and embellishments.

The high level of craftsmanship reflected on this sculpture demonstrate the lifelikeness and physical characteristics that this horse is supposed to embody: a handsome adult horse with an athletic body and a body of mane that is smooth, shiny and neat. Its posture is upright, its eyes are wide-opened and its head cocked at an angle that is upright but not facing upward.

The colours applied on this horse further enhance the lifelikeness of the horse, making it look very similar to a real horse. The contrast of green against brown on this sculpture, directs the viewer's attention immediately to the elaborate harness on the horse, so that viewers would notice the distinctive decoration on this harness.

The sculpture represents a Ferghana horse of a breed from Central Asia. Ferghana horses were very commonly depicted in Tang dynasty tomb figures.

== Iconological analysis ==
An iconology of a work of art is the interpretation of the symbolism in the visual imagery, especially in a broader sociopolitical context, so as to determine the underlying attitudes and characteristics of a civilisation.

=== Caring for the afterlife ===
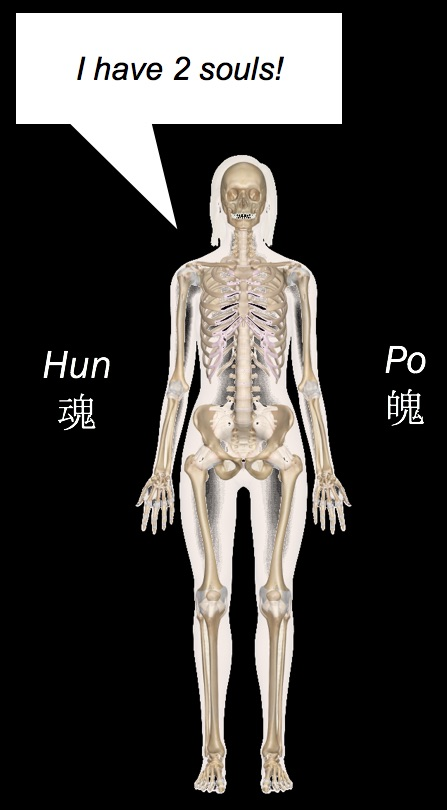
In ancient China, it was believed that every person has 2 souls: the 'hun' soul and the 'po' soul.

The ancient Chinese believed that every person has 2 souls – 1 is called ‘hun’ and the other is called ‘po’. When a person passes on, the hun soul leaves the body and ascends to heaven, while the po soul remains with the corpse. In ancient China, tomb artefacts were created specifically for the po soul to use in its afterlife, according to what the deceased usually needed and wanted when he or she was alive. The primary purpose of a tomb artefact was to care for its deceased master in his or her afterlife. Therefore, studying the tomb artefacts from different Chinese dynasties helps one to understand the changing social and historical circumstances of each dynasty, since the people of different dynasties had different needs and wants, depending on the sociopolitical situation of each dynasty.

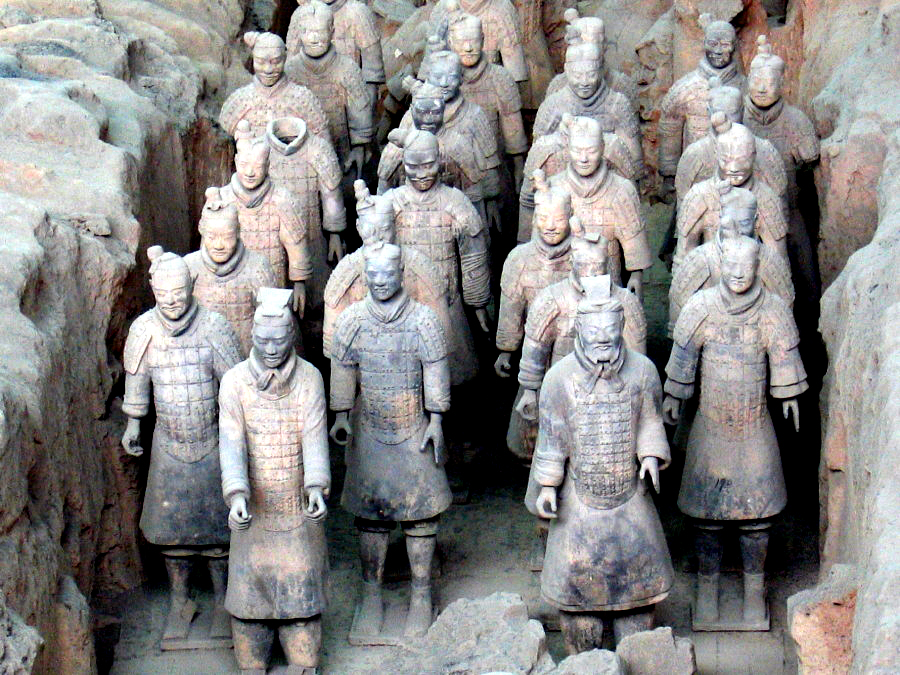
Part of a terracotta army from the Mausoleum of the First Qin Emperor.

For instance, numerous tomb artefacts of soldiers (also known as a "terracotta army") have been found in the Mausoleum of the First Qin Emperor. The Qin dynasty was militaristic, heavy-handed and bureaucratic - it was a time of intense and constant warfare with its neighbours and its military was the most powerful and technologically advanced in the world. Therefore, it is unsurprising to find an overwhelming quantity of tomb figurines cast in the image of soldiers in the tomb of Qin Shi Huang, the first emperor of China.

On the other hand, we find this chessboard set in a tomb from the Han dynasty. The Han dynasty was still a time of constant warfare. However, arts and culture were valued and widespread, and the Han Chinese had more freedom to debate philosophical issues and enjoy intellectual games, such as this game of chess. Chess was believed to help people understand military strategies.

During the Tang dynasty, the socio-political condition of China was dramatically different from the Qin and Han dynasties, leading to the production of tomb artefacts that were dramatically different too. Tang dynasty was one that was characterized by its extravagance, prosperity, stability and competitiveness, and these attributes are understandably reflected in the characteristics of tomb figurines produced in the Tang dynasty.

=== Assertion of Tang power ===
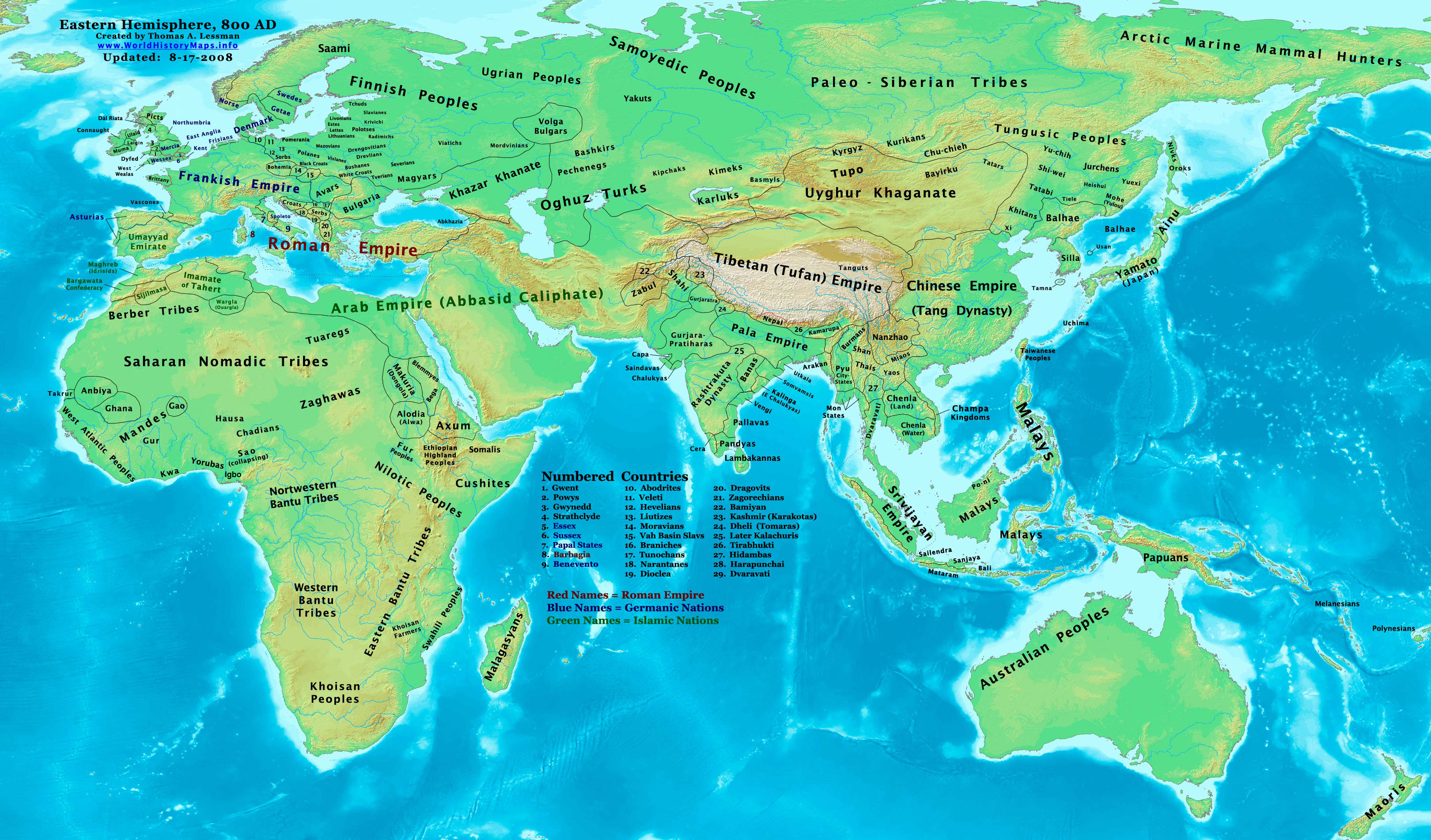
Sandwiched between East Asia and West Asia, Central Asia was characterised by conflicts and political pressure as the empires and states of East and West Asia often vied for control over Central Asia.

Another theme that is critical in the interpretation of this figurine of a Central Asian horse is the tense relationship between the nomads of Central Asia and the rest of Asia. Every dynasty in China had military conflicts with the nomads of Central Asia. The Tang empire competed fiercely with the Tibetan empire and the Islamic empires for control of Central Asia.

The nomads of Central Asia were fierce warriors with powerful warhorses. This is due to a combination of geographical and political reasons. Geographically, Central Asia is difficult for agriculture and it is also far from the sea, thereby cutting it off from trading. Hence, nomadic horse people dominated Central Asia for 2000 years. Their nomadic lifestyle naturally trained them to be highly suitable for warfare. Their horse-riding skills and archery techniques made them the most militarily powerful people in the world. Their military power is further sharpened by the fact that East Asia and West Asia were often competing to gain control of Central Asia.

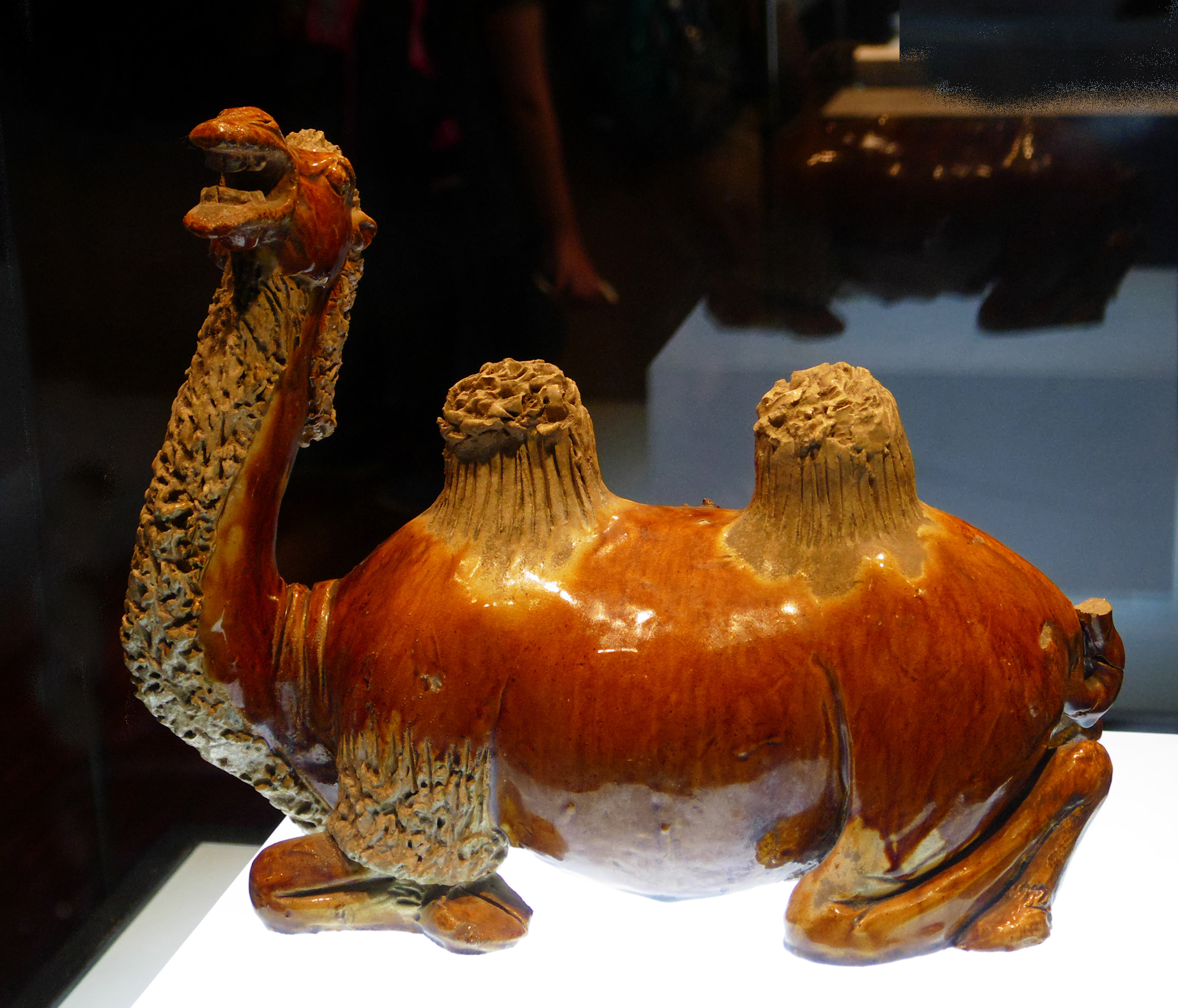
A sancai tomb figurine depicting a Central Asian camel.

It is in light of this socio-historical context that one realises why it was a source of pride for a Tang dynasty tomb to be filled with horses, camels, female attendants, robust manservants and exotic dancers from Central Asia. During the Tang period, the ability to own powerful horses and servants from Central Asia would have been a testimony of a person's wealth, power and social standing. This is especially since Central Asia was renowned for its military power, strong warriors and formidable horses. It would also have been reflective of a person's stylish, cosmopolitan taste, as it shows that this person is globalised and familiar with cultures outside of China. Many of Tang dynasty's tomb artefacts, such as Standing Horse, were meant to assert Tang China's power over Central Asia.

=== Opulence of Tang society ===
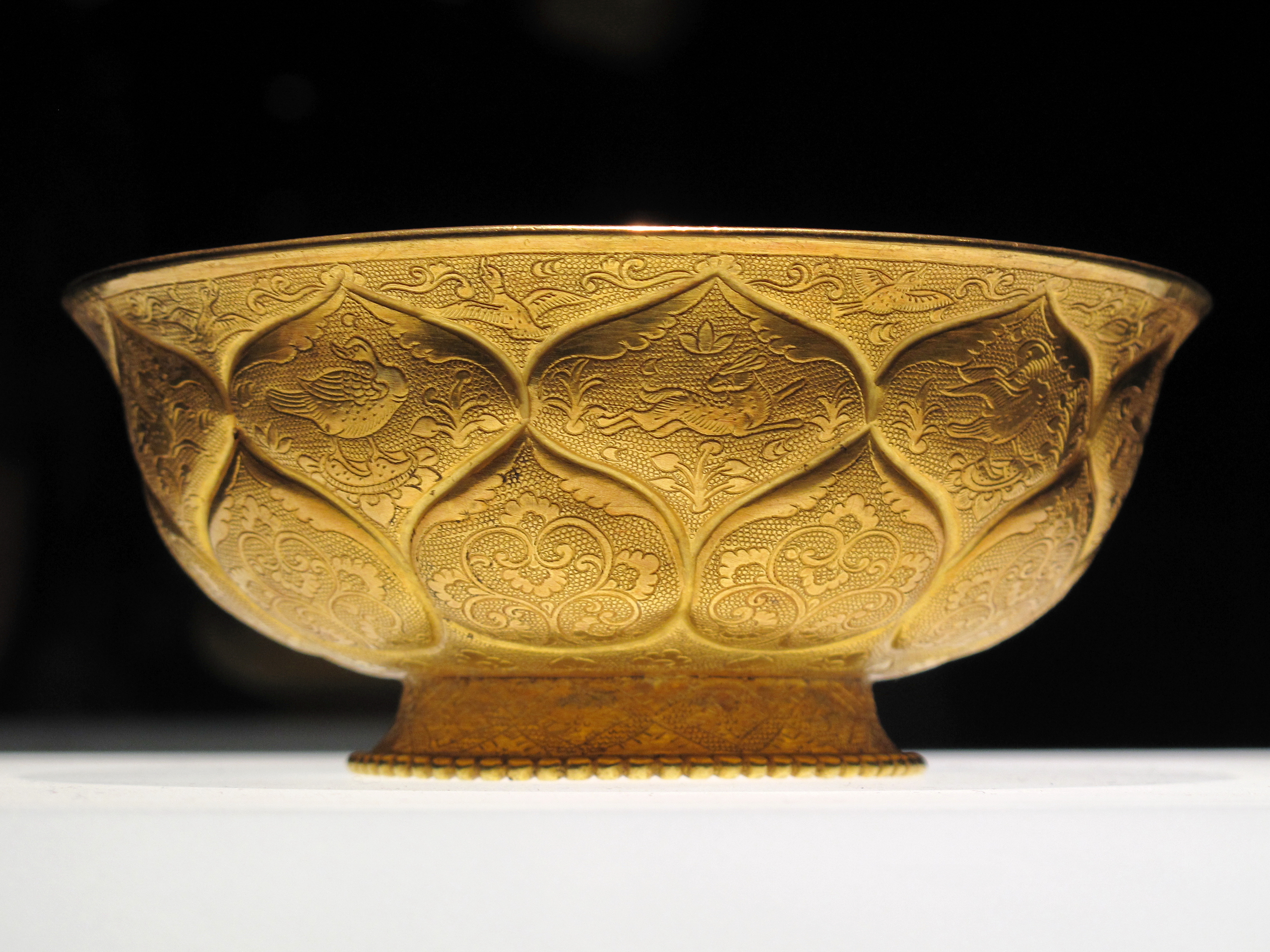
A gilt-gold bowl carved with lotus and animal motifs, from the Tang era.

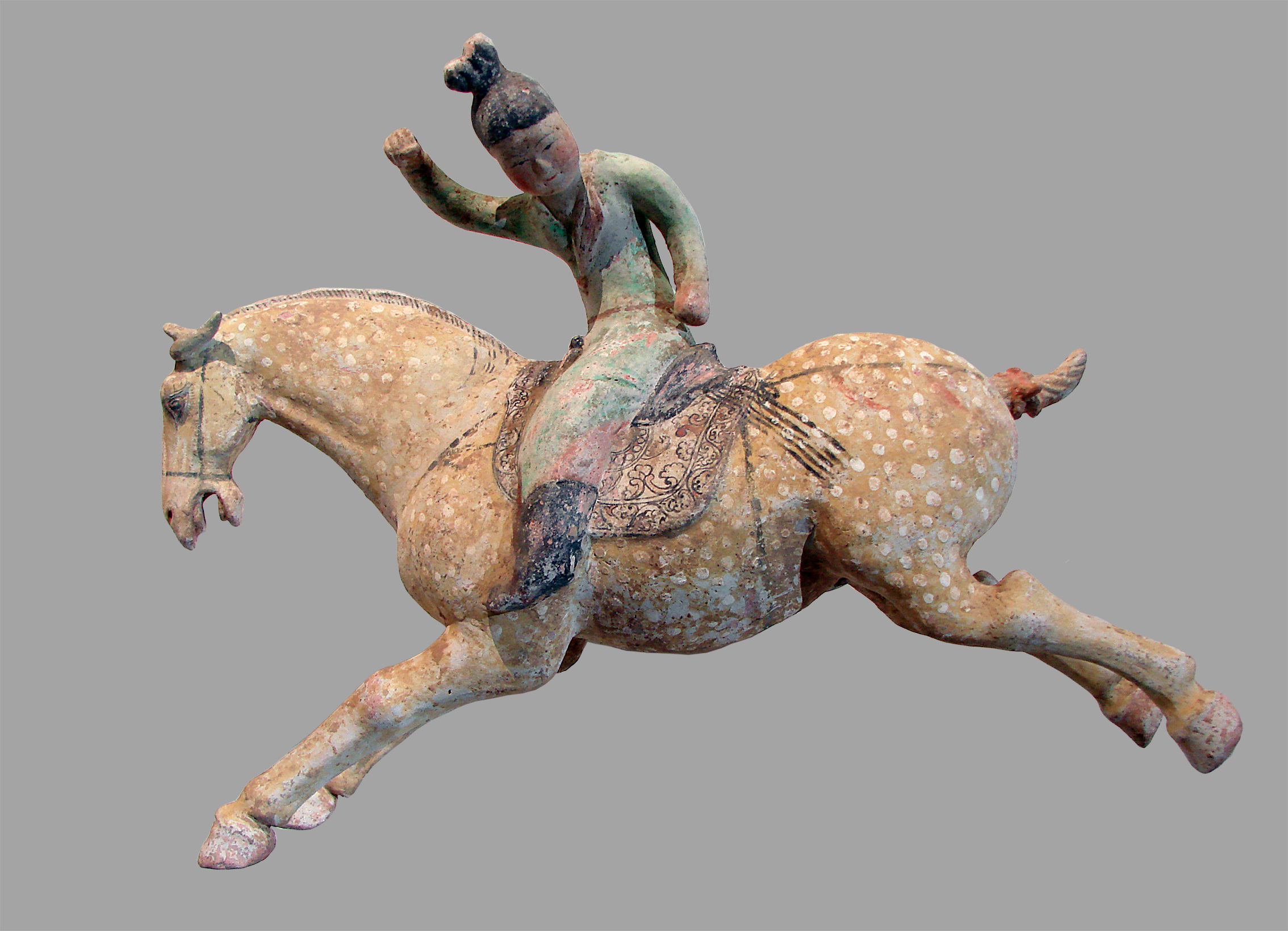
A Tang dynasty tomb figurine of a woman playing polo.

The Tang dynasty is generally regarded as a high point in Chinese civilisation, and a golden age of cosmopolitan culture. Many neighbouring countries maintained strong diplomatic ties with it, traded extensively with it and sought its economic assistance and military protection. It was a superpower, akin to the United States of today.

The capital of the Tang dynasty was the most populous city in the world. With this large population, the dynasty was able to have a professional and powerful army. The army not only defended the empire, but was also used to dominate the lucrative trade routes along the Silk Road. A huge population also meant that there were more professional craftsmen in the empire, to create large quantities and higher quality works of art.

It was a period of progress, prosperity and stability, making it a highly conducive environment to pursue the arts. Tomb figurines in the Tang dynasty often featured servants, attendants, dancers, musicians, camels and horses from Central Asia. In the tomb of a high-ranking male, there may also be figurines of soldiers, officials and Gējìs.

=== Performativity of Tang tomb figurines ===
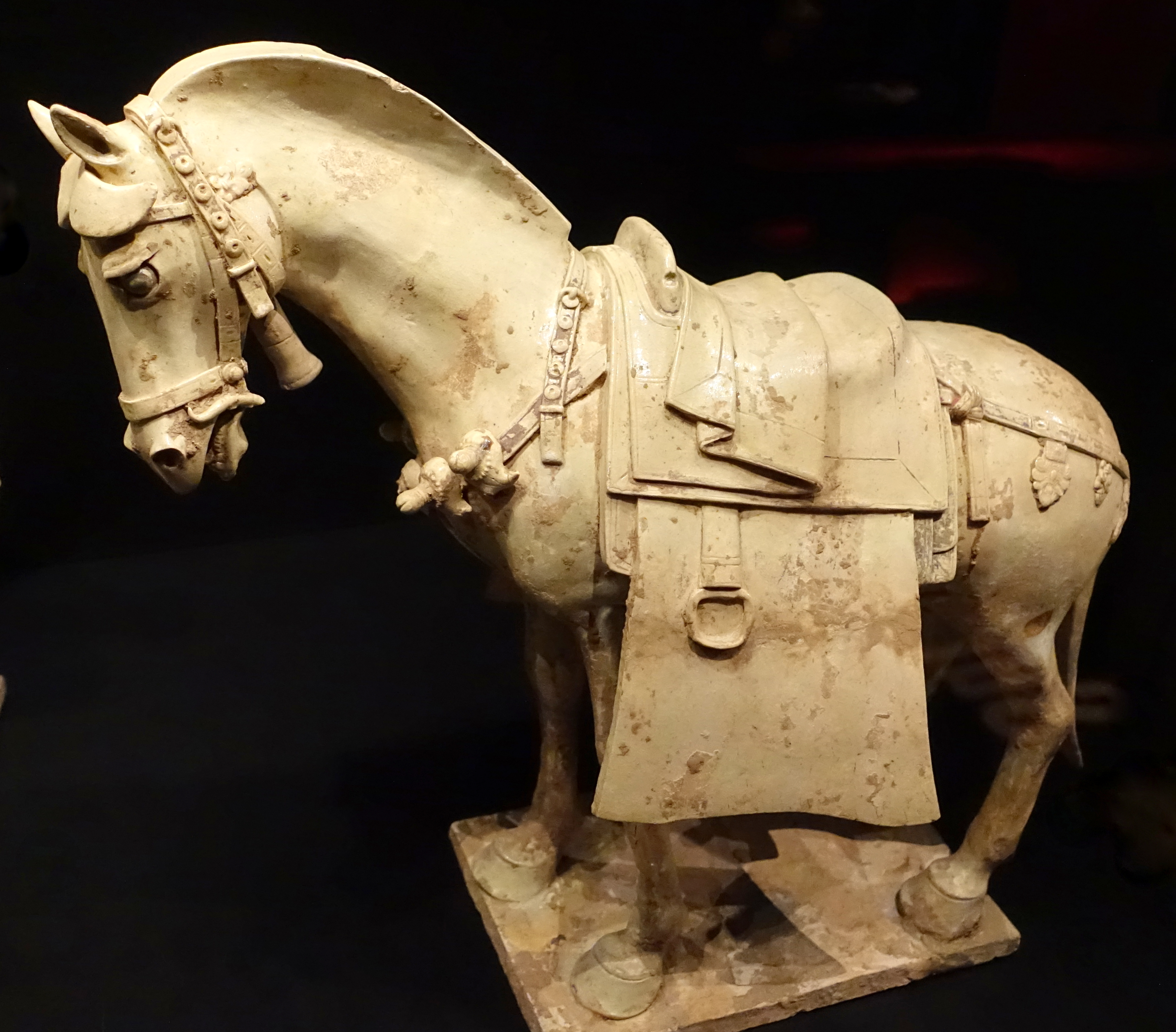
Earthenware figurine of a horse not glazed with Sancai - typically for someone wealthy but not an aristocrat or high-ranking official.

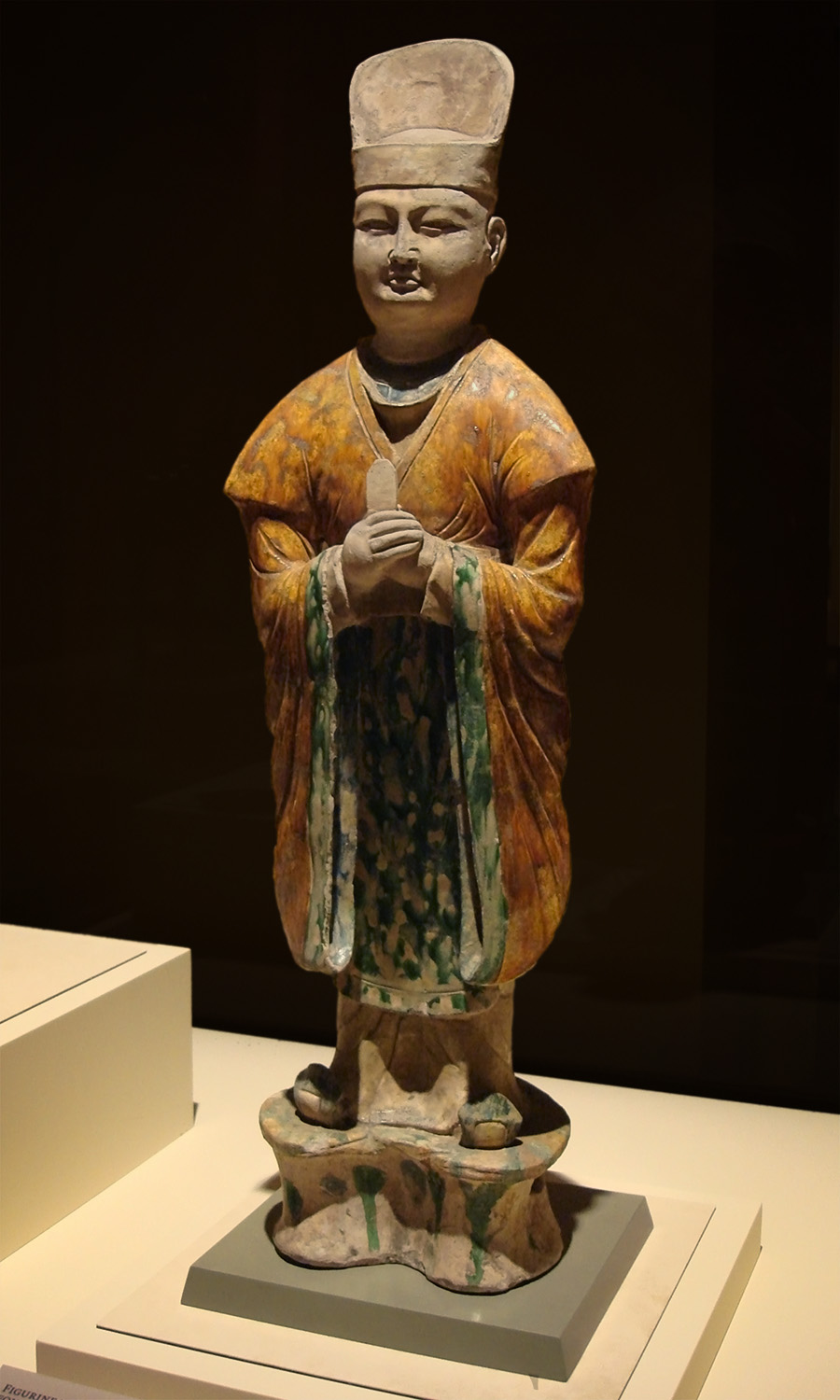
Sancai-glazed figurine of a civil official from the Tang dynasty.

Tomb figurines in the Tang dynasty were made to be visually compelling and it is especially obvious when they are seen in an entire set, or when compared with figurines of other dynasties. The intricate details of each figurine's craftsmanship imbue them with a great sense of physical presence and identity. Their personalised facial expressions and postures distinguish each figurine in an imaginable time and space.

This great emphasis on the performativity of tomb figurines could be related to the competitive Tang culture of publicly displaying one's wealth and power. The social classes of Tang society were mobile. This means that people in the different social classes could improve its status through hard work and move to an upper class. This created a competitive society, where people often showed off their wealth and power. Members of prominent families or high-ranking officials often paraded through streets in the public, with troops of servants mounted on beautiful horses. This culture of public display takes place even during funerals. After the funerary ceremonies at home are complete, there would be a funeral procession to transport the deceased from home to gravesite.

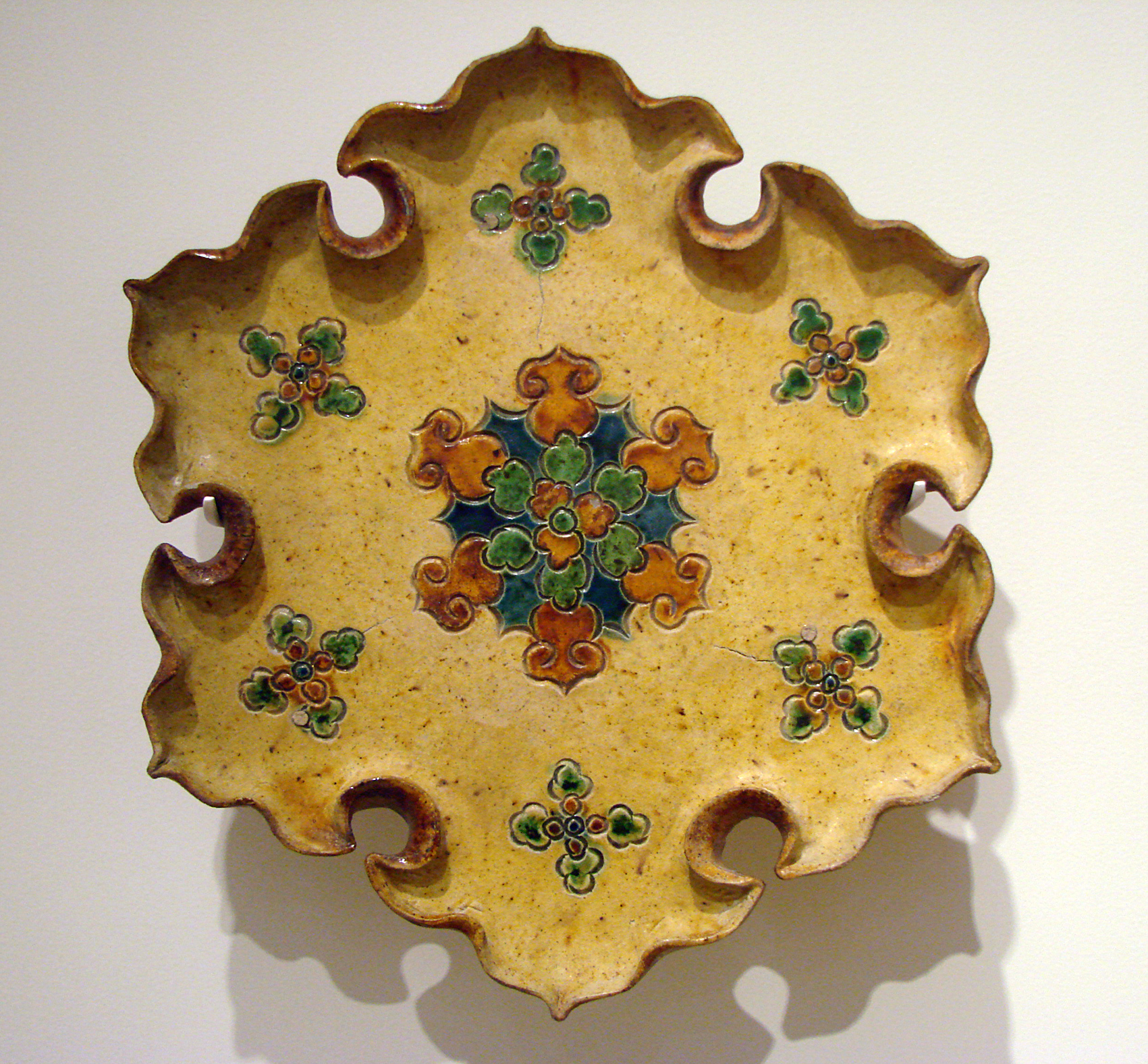
A Tang dynasty plate glazed in Sancai.

The funeral procession is a highly elaborate, visible and competitive public spectacle, designed to impress the public with altars, canopies, flowers, paper figurines, burnt offerings and most importantly, with the display of impressive tomb figurines. The competitive nature of funeral processions got so out of hand, that the emperor had to issue imperial edicts to regulate the quantity and size of tomb figurines, according to the deceased's social status. Tomb artefacts were meant to glorify its deceased master and the master's living family, and to provide a luxurious lifestyle in the afterlife.

Tomb figurines of the Tang dynasty were characterized by its wide variety, high quality, energy, performance and lifelikeness. The tomb figurines of Tang China were unprecedented – never before in Chinese history were the figurines endowed with such qualities. The pursuit of more and more vibrant colours led to the invention of the tri-colour glazing technique, or Sancai glaze, to further enhance the visual appearance of the figurines. This great emphasis on performance burial and extravagant tomb figurines in Tang China, is consistent with Tang China's opulent culture, media and arts.

== Provenance ==
This sculpture is now in the Asian Gallery collections of the National Gallery of Australia. It was a gift to the gallery in 1995 by Dr. Tsui Tsin-tong from Hong Kong, through the National Gallery of Australia Foundation.
