= Xu Zhijun =

Chinese entrepreneur (born 1967)

- 徐直军
- Born: 1967 (age 58–59); Yiyang, Hunan, China
- Education: Nanjing University of Science and Technology
- Occupation: Entrepreneur
- Years active: 1993–present
- Agent: Huawei Technologies Co., Ltd.

Chinese name
- Traditional Chinese: 徐直軍
- Simplified Chinese: 徐直军
Transcriptions
Standard Mandarin
- Hanyu Pinyin: Xú Zhíjūn

Xu Zhijun (Chinese: 徐直军; born 1967) is a Chinese entrepreneur currently serving as deputy chairman and rotating chairman of the Huawei Technologies Co., Ltd.

== Biography ==
Xu was born in 1967 in Yiyang, Hunan. He graduated from Nanjing University of Science and Technology. Xu joined the Huawei Technologies Co., Ltd. in 1993, he served in several posts, including president of its Wireless Products, president of its Strategy and Marketing, president of its Products and Solutions, and director of its Product Investment Review Committee.

On March 23, 2018, Xu was elected deputy chairman of Huawei and became a member of its board of directors.

Business positions
New title	Chairman of HiSilicon; 2004–2025	Succeeded by Gao Ji (高戟)
