= Hye (Korean name) =

- Hangul: 혜
- RR: Hye
- MR: Hye
- IPA: [çe]

Hye (Korean: 혜) is a Korean given name. Notable people with the name include:

- Hye of Baekje (died 599), 28th King of Baekje
- Prince Deokheung (fl. 14th century), personal name Wang Hye

== See also ==
- List of Korean given names
