= Xu Kecheng =

Chinese cancer specialist (born 1940)

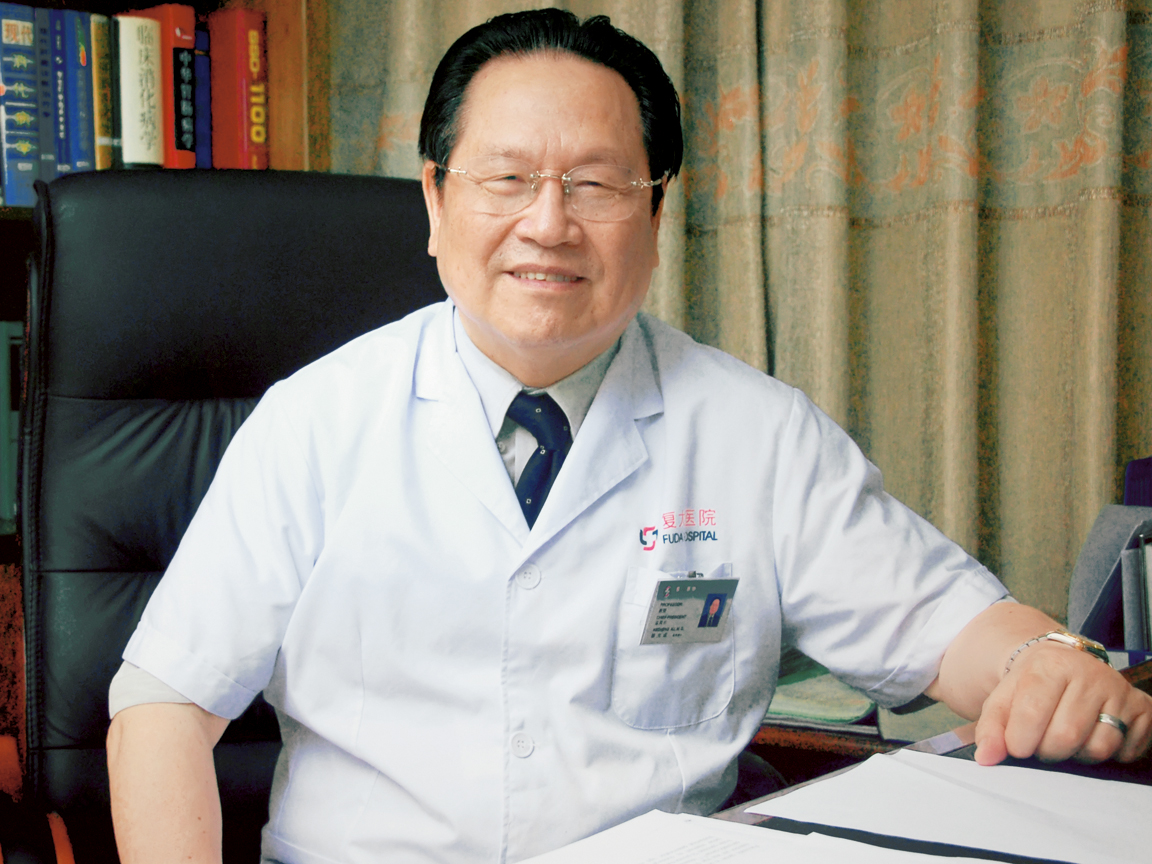
Xu in 2009

Xu Kecheng (born August 23, 1940) is a Chinese specialist in gastroenterology, hepatology and cancer treatment and president of Guangzhou Fuda Cancer Hospital. Born in Nantong, Jiangsu Province, Xu Kecheng graduated from Nantong Medical College. He is honorary Chairman of the International Society of Cryosurgery (ISC). He was awarded the "Bethune Medal" in 2012 for his contributions to China's national healthcare system. In 2014, he was awarded the title of "the Role Model of the Times" by the Propaganda Department of the Central Committee of the CPC.

He was professor of internal medicine and director of digestive research at Nantong University, guest professor in First Military Medical University, visiting professor at Chiba University in Japan, Wright state university, Johns Hopkins University in USA. He is the Chief member for Digestive Disease Committee of Chinese Association of Integrated TCM and Western Medicine, the head of the National Cancer Research Collaboration Committee.

== Edited books ==
- Nothing but the Truth, Guangzhou Publishing House, Guangzhou, 2010.
- Modern Cryosurgery for Cancer, World Scientific Publishing, Singapore 2012.
