= Umakishore Ramachandran =

Umakishore Ramachandran from the Georgia Institute of Technology School of Computer Science was named Fellow of the Institute of Electrical and Electronics Engineers (IEEE) in 2014 for contributions to programming idioms for parallel and distributed systems and design of scalable shared memory systems. He is currently teaching CS 2200.
