= Xu Pu =

Chinese official (1429–1499)

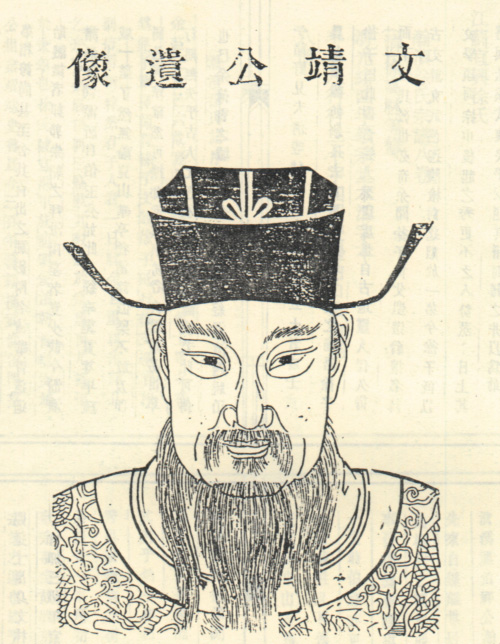

Senior Grand Secretary
- In office 1492–1498
- Preceded by: Liu Ji
- Succeeded by: Liu Jian

Personal details
- Born: 1429
- Died: 1499 (aged 69–70)

Xu Pu (Chinese: 徐溥, 1429–1499) was a minister during the reign of the Ming dynasty Hongzhi Emperor.

== Biography ==
Xu Pu was a scholar in the palace, and graduated after the highest Imperial examination as a jinshi (進士), or "chosen scholar", in 1454 AD. He entered the Grand Secretariat as a Minister in 1487 AD. He had a quiet, conservative style, which aimed at compromise and friendly relations with his colleagues. His predecessor was Liu Ji. Xu Pu wanted the Emperor to rein in the power of Li Guang and the Daoists, but failed with his protests. He was received in audience only once during his 12 years as Minister.

However, in 1497 AD Xu was entrusted with the preparation of the Collected Statutes of the Ming Dynasty, which were published after his death in 1509 AD.

He was known to be lenient to his subordinates and in private life he was distinguished for filial piety and charity. When he died in 1499 AD Xu left 800 mu of tax-free land to the poor of his clan and was canonised as Wen Jing (文靖).

== See also ==
- Collected Statutes of the Ming Dynasty
