= Ophelia Tsui =

Chinese physicist

Ophelia Kwan Chui Tsui (Chinese: 徐崑翠, born 1967) is a Chinese physicist who studies experimental polymer science, particularly focusing on the physical properties and glass transition behavior of thin films of polymers, and their study using atomic force microscopy and dielectric spectroscopy. She is a professor of physics at Hong Kong University of Science and Technology, where she directs the William Mong Institute of Nano Science and Technology.

== Education and career ==
Tsui has a bachelor's degree from the University of Hong Kong and a Ph.D. from Princeton University, completed in 1996.

After postdoctoral research at the Massachusetts Institute of Technology and University of Massachusetts Amherst, she became an assistant professor of physics at Hong Kong University of Science and Technology (HKUST) in 1998. She moved to Boston University from 2007 until 2017, when she returned to HKUST.

== Recognition ==
Tsui was elected as a Fellow of the American Physical Society (APS) in 2011, after a nomination from the APS Division of Polymer Physics, "for outstanding contributions on the dynamics of thin polymer films".
