= Steve Hui Chun-tak =

Former Hong Kong Assistant Commissioner of Police

Steve Hui Chun-Tak
- Employer: Hong Kong Police
- Known for: Televised news updates during the 2014 Hong Kong protests

Chinese name
- Traditional Chinese: 許鎮德
Transcriptions
Yue: Cantonese
- Yale Romanization: Héui Jandāk
- Jyutping: Heoi2 Zan3dak1

Steve Hui Chun-Tak is the former Assistant Commissioner of Police of the Hong Kong Police Force. Hui became well known during the 2014 Occupy campaign, when he started to give daily televised updates from 30 September 2014 as Chief Superintendent of Police. A Facebook page '四點鐘許sir' ('Four O'Clock Hui Sir') where 'four o'clock' refers to the time of his daily broadcast created by a netizen on 8 October 2014 receiving more than 50,000 followers within a week.

== Career ==
In 2001, Hui held the position of Chief Inspector. In 2008, he held the position of Yau Tsim District Operations officer. On 12 May 2008, he was promoted to the post of Superintendent of Police (SP). On 13 September 2010, he was promoted to the post of Senior Superintendent of Police (SSP). On 28 March 2014, Hui was promoted to the post of Chief Superintendent (CSP). Hui was then appointed as head of the public relations bureau. In November 2015, Hui left the bureau to become district commander in Sham Shui Po.

After leaving the police, he was appointed as a managing director of Sun Bus (a subsidy of Transport International, which is also the parent company of Kowloon Motor Bus) and later also the chief administrative officer of Transport International in 2019.

== Awards and appreciations ==
In 2004, Hui received the award Hong Kong Police Long Service medal and clasps to the medal.

The Hong Kong Hotels Association appreciated the work done by TST Division to achieve a 20% reduction in hotel crime between May and June 2008, presented Certificates of Appreciation to Hui along with three officers of Yau Tsim District.

In May 2018, Hui retired as Assistant Commissioner of Police after having served the police force for more than 31 years.

== Sports ==
- Hui is a member of the Police badminton team.
- In 2001, Hui along with his team member Law Kam-hon won the 45 years and above-age group Master Games Badminton Competition organized by the Leisure and Cultural Services Department.
- In 2000 and 2001, Hui along with his team member Law Kam-hon won the 35 years and above-age group Master Games Badminton Competition organized by the Leisure and Cultural Services Department.
- In 2001, Hui along with Woman Detective Police Constable Tong Yee-man won the mixed doubles competition at the Police Annual Badminton Championships
- In 2001, Hui leading the Police badminton team, won the 8th Disciplined Services Badminton Competition, after beating teams from the Fire Services, Customs, and Excise, Immigration, and Correctional Services Departments.
- In 2014, Hui and his team played and won matches against the Hong Kong Medical Association's team and Hong Kong Institute of Certified Public Accountants (CPA).

== Education ==
Hui studied biology at the Hong Kong Baptist University.
