= Hsu Ming-yuan =

Taiwanese politician

- 徐明淵

Deputy Minister of Council of Indigenous Peoples of the Republic of China
- Minister: Sun Ta-chuan

Personal details
- Education: Soochow University; National Chengchi University

Hsu Ming-yuan (Chinese: 徐明淵; pinyin: Xú Míngyuān) is a Taiwanese politician. He currently serves as the Deputy Minister of the Council of Indigenous Peoples of the Executive Yuan.

== See also ==
- Taiwanese aborigines
