= Wenyuan Xu =

Chinese computer scientist

Wenyuan Xu (Chinese: 徐文渊) is a Chinese computer scientist specializing in computer security for wireless networks, embedded systems, and the internet of things. She is a professor in the College of Engineering of Zhejiang University, where she directs the Ubiquitous System Security Lab.

== Education and career ==
Xu studied electrical engineering at Zhejiang University, graduating in 1998, and continuing for a master's degree in 2001. She completed a Ph.D. at Rutgers University in the US in 2007. Her dissertation, Defending Wireless Networks from Radio Interference Attacks, was jointly supervised by Wade Trappe and Yanyong Zhang.

She joined the Department of Computer Science and Engineering at the University of South Carolina, becoming an associate professor there, before returning to Zhejiang University as a professor in 2013.

== Recognition ==
Xu won the Chinese Young Women in Science Award in 2023. She was named an IEEE Fellow, in the 2024 class of fellows, "for contributions to embedded systems for automobile security".
