= Xu Junping =

- Military career
- Allegiance: China
- Branch: People's Liberation Army
- Rank: Colonel
- Commands: People's Liberation Army

Xu Junping (徐俊平) is a former senior colonel in the People's Liberation Army who defected to the United States in December 2000. He is the highest-ranking defector from the PLA, and his defection was described as one of the worst intelligence losses in China's history.

== Career ==
Xu was an American specialist within the PLA and an expert on disarmament. Prior to his defection, Xu was responsible for day-to-day military contact between China and the Americas. Prior to his defection, Xu was the director of the American and Oceanic Office of the Foreign Affairs Bureau of the Ministry of National Defense.

Xu had studied in America as a visiting scholar at Harvard's John F. Kennedy School of Government, and had also studied at the University of Bath in the United Kingdom.

== Defection ==
Xu reportedly contacted the Central Intelligence Agency (CIA) of his own initiative. His defection was acknowledged by the Ministry of Foreign Affairs of the People's Republic of China.
