= Xu Chan =

Xu Chan 徐蕆 was a 12th-century scholar, who wrote a preface to the 韻補 Yunbu of 吳域 Wu Yu (circa 1100–1154) in which he first proposed the xiesheng hypothesis.
