= Xu Guoping =

Chinese politician

- 徐郭平

Mayor of Taizhou
- In office January 2011 – December 2013
- Succeeded by: Lu Zhipeng

Mayor of Taizhou (acting)
- In office July 2010 – January 2011
- Preceded by: Yao Jianhua

Vice Mayor of Zhenjiang
- In office May 2003 – December 2005

Personal details
- Born: January 1961 (age 65) China

Xu Guoping (Simplified Chinese: 徐郭平; born in January 1961) is a Chinese politician who served as the mayor of Taizhou of the Jiangsu Province.

== Career ==
When he joined the Communist Party in June 1986 to participate the work, earned a doctoral degree in December 1984. He was one of the representatives of Twelfth National People's Congress in the Jiangsu Province.

In 1978, Xu went into the East China Institute of Chemical Engineering Department of energetic materials professional study, after graduation to study the Department of Chemical Engineering Department of polymer chemistry to graduate students and chemical engineering Department of polymer chemistry doctoral students. In April 1988, he decides to stay in school to teach. In December 1988, he was transferred to the Hong Kong Industrial Company cadres, and in May 1990, he got transferred to China Jiangsu International Economic and Technical Cooperation Corporation, served as import and export trade company cadres, chemical manager; foreign trade branch manager; assistant general manager, foreign trade Company Manager; Company Director, Assistant General Manager, Manager of Foreign Trade Branch; Company Director, Deputy General Manager, Party Member and other staff.

In May 2003, Xu served as vice mayor of Zhenjiang. In December 2005, he was the member of the CPC Zhenjiang Municipal Committee, and the Organization Department Minister. In January 2007, he was appointed by the Jiangsu Province Safety Production Supervision and Administration Bureau, party secretary, Jiangsu coal mine safety supervision Secretary of the party group. In July 2009, he was transferred to the Jiangsu Province, human resources, the social security department director, and party secretary.

July 2010, Xu was appointed as the acting mayor of Taizhou, and deputy secretary of the CPC Taizhou Municipal Committee. Then, in January 2011, he was formally elected as the mayor of Taizhou. In 2013, he was elected to the National People's Congress. In December of the same year, he was promoted as the Jiangsu Provincial SASAC director, party secretary and deputy secretary of the CPC Jiangsu Provincial Party Committee Organization Department.
