= Xu Datong =

Chinese political scientist and academic (1928–2019)

- Chinese: 徐大同
Transcriptions
Standard Mandarin
- Hanyu Pinyin: Xú Dàtóng
- Wade–Giles: Hsü2 Ta4-t'ung2

Xu Datong (Chinese: 徐大同; 16 September 1928 – 9 June 2019) was a Chinese political scientist and legal scholar, considered one of China's "Five Elders" of political science. He was a distinguished professor at Tianjin Normal University.

== Biography ==
Xu was born on 16 September 1928 in Tianjin, Republic of China. He began his studies at North China University (a predecessor of Renmin University of China) in January 1949, and later taught in the departments of law and political science at the university. In 1973, he became a faculty member of Peking University. In 1978, he returned to his hometown to teach at Tianjin Normal University.

After the end of the Cultural Revolution, Xu worked at restoring the study of political science in China, and trained the first generation of professional educators in the field. He taught more than 50 master's students and over 20 doctoral students.

Xu published about 50 research papers and 20 books, including the five-volume History of Western Political Thought (西方政治思想史), which is highly influential in China and widely used as a university textbook. Another major work of his is Lectures on Traditional Chinese Politics and Culture (中国传统政治文化讲录).

Xu was acclaimed as one of China's "Five Elders" of political science, along with Xia Shuzhang of Sun Yat-sen University, Wang Huiyan of Jilin University, Qiu Xiao of Soochow University, and Zhao Baoxu of Peking University.

He served as a delegate to the 6th National People's Congress from 1983 to 1988, and as a legal and political advisor to the Tianjin Municipal Government from 1980 to 1999.

Xu died in Tianjin on 9 June 2019, at the age of 90.
