= Xu Xiake =

Chinese geographer and traveller

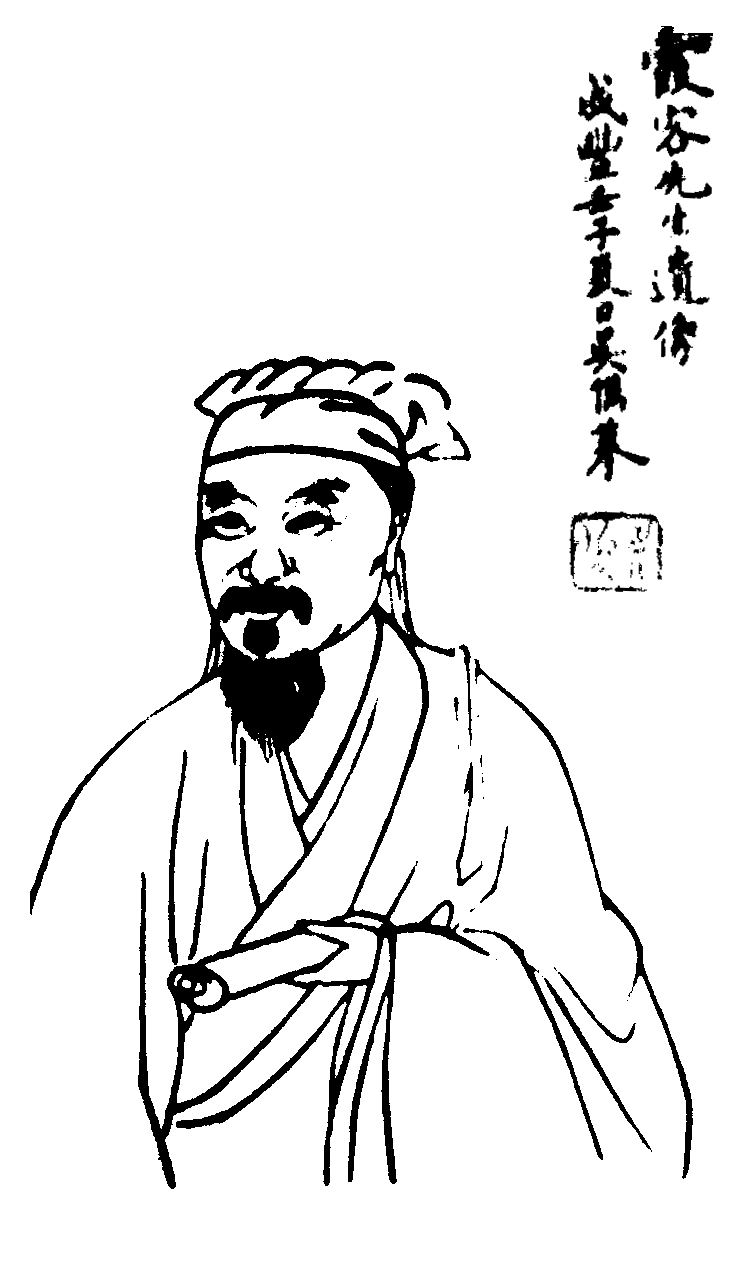
- Portrait of Xu Xiake
- Born: Xu Hongzu; 5 January 1587; Jiangsu, Ming China
- Died: 8 March 1641 (aged 54); Jiangyin, Nanzhili, Ming China
- Occupations: Explorer, geographer, travel writer

Xu Xiake
- Chinese: 徐霞客
Transcriptions
Standard Mandarin
- Hanyu Pinyin: Xú Xiákè
- Wade–Giles: Hsü^{2} Hsia^{2}-k'o^{4}
- IPA: [ɕy̌ ɕjǎ.kʰɤ̂]
Yue: Cantonese
- Yale Romanization: Chèui Hàahhaak
- Jyutping: Ceoi4 Haa4-haak3
- IPA: [tsʰɵɥ˩ ha˩.hak̚˧]

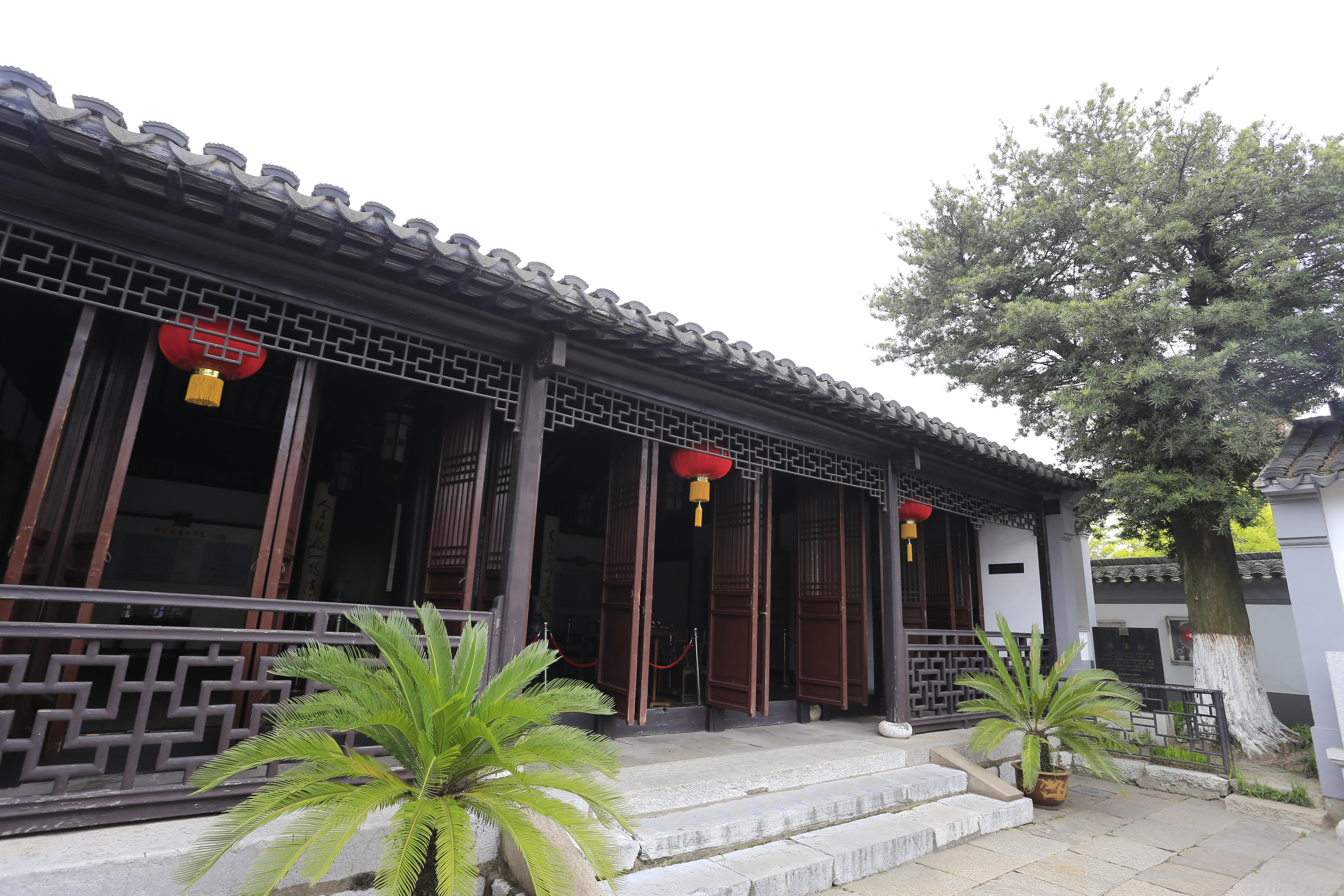
Former residence of Xu Xiake in Jiangyin

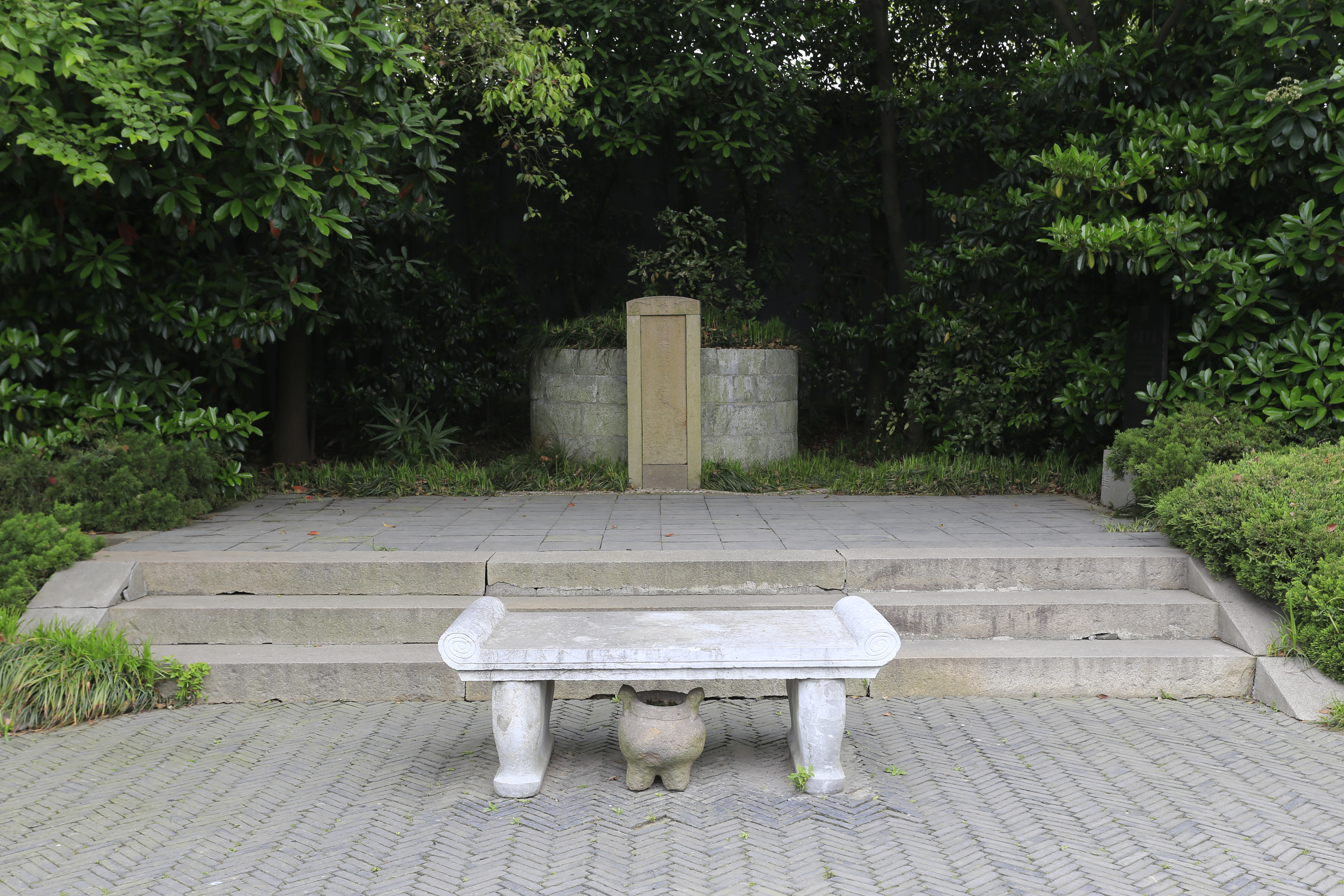
Tomb of Xu Xiake

Xu Xiake (Chinese: 徐霞客; pinyin: Xú Xiákè; Wade–Giles: Hsü Hsia-k'o, January 5, 1587 – March 8, 1641), born Xu Hongzu (徐弘祖), courtesy name Zhenzhi (振之), was a Chinese explorer, geographer, and travel writer of the Ming dynasty, known best for his famous geographical treatise, and noted for his bravery and humility. He traveled throughout China for more than 30 years, documenting his travels extensively. The records of his travels were compiled posthumously in The Travel Diaries of Xu Xiake, and his work translated by Ding Wenjiang. Xu's writing falls under the old Chinese literary category of 'travel record literature' ('youji wenxue'“遊記文學”), which used narrative and prose styles of writing to portray one's travel experiences.

The People's Liberation Army Navy barracks ship Xu Xiake was named after him.

== Life ==
With ancestors from Jiangxi province, Xu Xiake was born in what is today Jiangyin (in Jiangsu province) as Xu Hongzu (宏祖), as the second son of Xu Yu'an (徐豫庵, 1545–1604) and Wang Ruren (王孺人, 1545–1625). It was often said his mother encouraged him to travel and this shaped Xu's predilections. His sobriquet is Zhenzhi (振之). Xiake was an alternate sobriquet (別號) given to him by his friend Chen Jiru (陳繼儒, 1558–1639) and it means "one who is in the sunset clouds". His other friend, Huang Daozhou (黃道周, 1585–1646), also gave Xu an alternate sobriquet: Xiayi (霞逸), meaning "untrammelled in the sunset clouds."

On his journeys throughout China, he travelled with a servant called Gu Xing (顧行). He faced many hardships along the way, as he was often dependent on the patronage of local scholars who would help him after he had been robbed of all his belongings. Local Buddhist abbots of the various places he visited often would pay him money as well, for the small service of recording the history of their local monastery. From the snowy passes of Sichuan, to the subtropical jungles of Guangxi and Yunnan, to the mountains of Tibet, Xu Xiake wrote of all his experiences and provided enormous amounts of written detail from his observations.

== Travel records ==
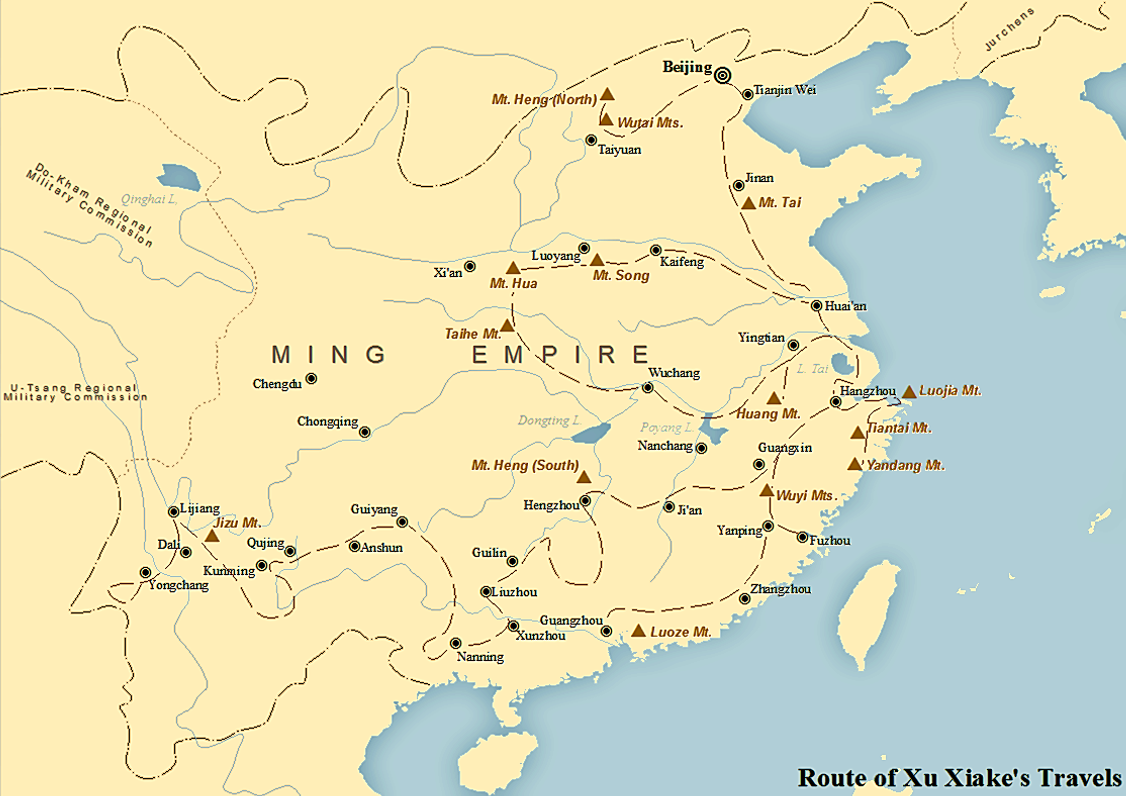
Travel routes of Xu Xiake

The written work of Xu Xiake's travel records and diaries contained some 404,000 Chinese characters, an enormous work for a single author of his time. Xu traveled throughout the provinces of Ming China, often on foot, to write his enormous geographical and topographical treatise, documenting various details of his travels, such as the locations of small gorges, or mineral beds such as mica schists. Xu's work was quite systematic, providing accurate details of measurement, and his work, later translated into modern Chinese by Ding Wenjiang, reads more like the accounts of a 20th-century field surveyor than an early 17th-century scholar. In Guizhou, he made the discovery of the true source of the West River. He also discovered the Mekong and Salween rivers were, in fact, separate drainages with completely separate watersheds. Xu made the important realization that the Jinsha river network – and not the Min or Yalong – formed the true headwaters of the Yangtze River, correcting a mistake in Chinese geography as old as the "Tribute of Yu" compiled by Confucius in the Classic of History.
