= Daguan-class troopship =

Chinese PLA auxiliary ship

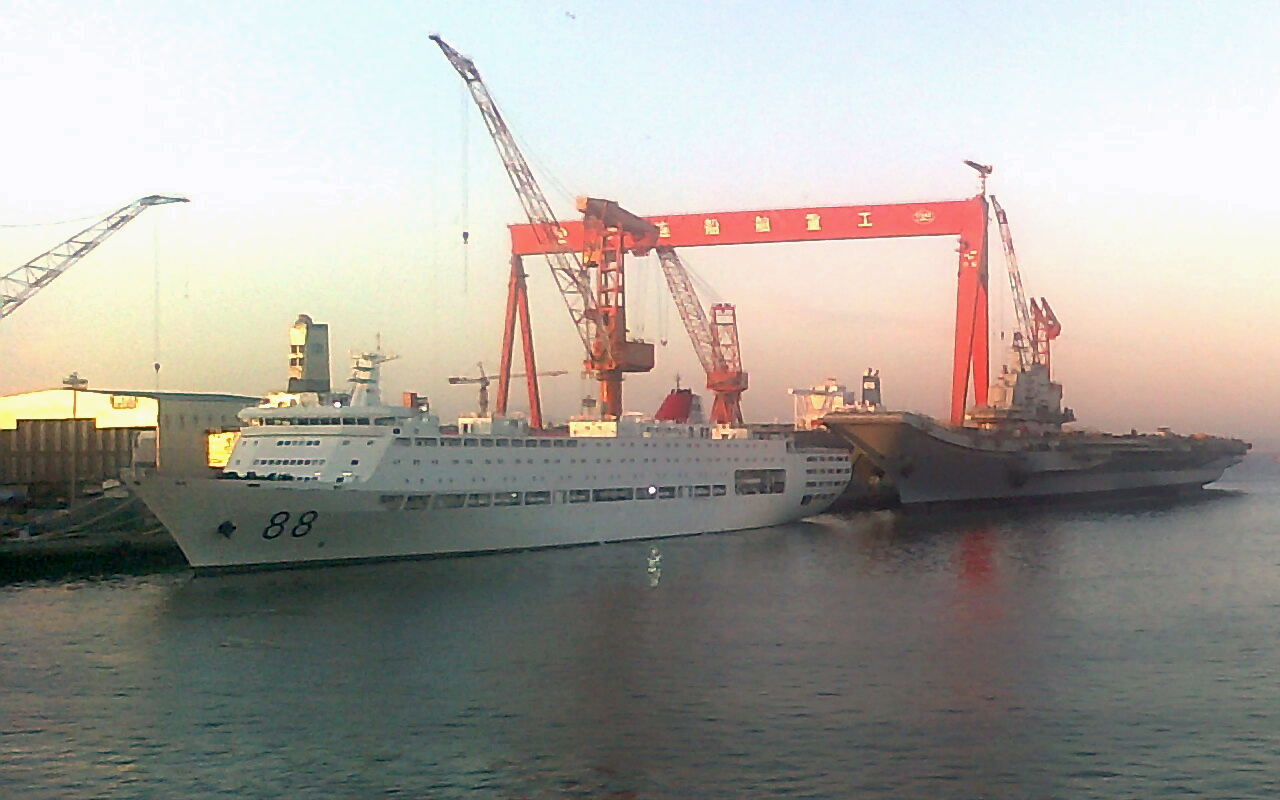
- Daguan-class troopship Xu Xiake berthed in front of the carrier Liaoning at Dalian Shipyard, July 2011

Class overview
- Operators: People's Liberation Army Navy
- In service: 2011 - present
- Completed: 2
- Active: 2

General characteristics
- Type: Troopship / Training ship / "Comprehensive support ship"
- Displacement: 23,200–30,000 tonnes (22,800–29,500 long tons; 25,600–33,100 short tons) (full)
- Length: 196 metres (643 ft)
- Beam: 28 metres (92 ft)
- Capacity: 2,500 support personnel
- Aviation facilities: Medium helicopter deck

The Daguan-class troopship (as designated by NATO) is a class of auxiliary ship in People's Republic of China's People's Liberation Army Navy (PLAN). They are used by the Chinese aircraft carrier programme to support sea trials, and to provide berthing, logistical support and training. The ships are classed as "comprehensive support ships" in Chinese.

The first entered service in 2011 in support of the Liaoning aircraft carrier.

== Design ==
According to publicly released information, the Daguan-class ships are approximately 196 meters long, with a beam of 28 meters. Capable of accommodating roughly 2,500 sailors, aircrew, technicians, and other carrier personnel, each ship has an endurance of up to 30 days. The ships are capable of a max speed of 18 knots. They have a range of 8,000 nautical miles. Each ship has a medium helicopter deck on its stern, which can accommodate one Changhe Z-8 heavy transport helicopter.

The ships are armed with two sets of Type 81 rocket launchers, which can fire anti-submarine missiles. They are armed with an additional two sets of 57 mm twin-barreled guns and two sets of 30 mm twin-barreled autocannons.

The ships are outfitted with additional accommodations for the crew, including internet cafes, coffee shops, a supermarket, a running track, a basketball court on the deck, a gym and a Sanda ring. The ships are sometimes called the "nannies" of aircraft carriers. To fulfill its training role, Xu Xiake is also equipped with simulators of various equipment onboard the Liaoning.

== Operational history ==
The Daguan-class ships provide support for China's growing fleet of aircraft carriers and are also used as training ships. They also provide living accommodations for the personnel of aircraft carriers when the carriers undergo maintenance, upgrades or overhauls. The first ship of the class, Xu Xiake accompanied Liaoning on sea trials. Xu Xiake provided at-sea training and R&R facilities for crew-members of the Liaoning.

On August 27, 2014, Xu Xiake sailed in a group with the corvette Datong, frigate Yancheng, and frigate Linyi to Liugong Island at the mouth of Weihai bay. The ships held a memorial ceremony to commemorate the 120th anniversary of the First Sino-Japanese War.

In 2018, the second ship of the class Li Daoyuan supported China's second aircraft carrier Shandong when it began its sea trials. In March 2023, a Daguan-class ship was berthed with China's first indigenously designed carrier Fujian in Jiangnan Shipyard. The simulators onboard the Daguan-class were likely upgraded for the more advanced CATOBAR system of Fujian.

== Ships of the class ==
| Name | Namesake | Pennant number | Builder | Launched | Commissioned | Fleet | Status |
|---|---|---|---|---|---|---|---|
| Xu Xiake (ex-Go ahead No. 1) | Xu Xiake | 88 | COMEC (CSSC Guangzhou shipyard) | — | 2011 | — | Active |
| Li Daoyuan (ex-Go ahead No. 2) | Li Daoyuan | 89 | — | — | Before / In January 2018 | — | Active |
