= Tsui Tsin-tong =

徐展堂 Tsui Tsin-tong
- Born: 1941; Ji'an, Jiangxi, China
- Died: 2 April 2010; Beijing
- Occupation: Industrial entrepreneur
- Known for: North Sea Group, Tsui Art Foundation

Tsui Tsin-tong
- Traditional Chinese: 徐展堂
Transcriptions
Standard Mandarin
- Hanyu Pinyin: Xú Zhǎntáng

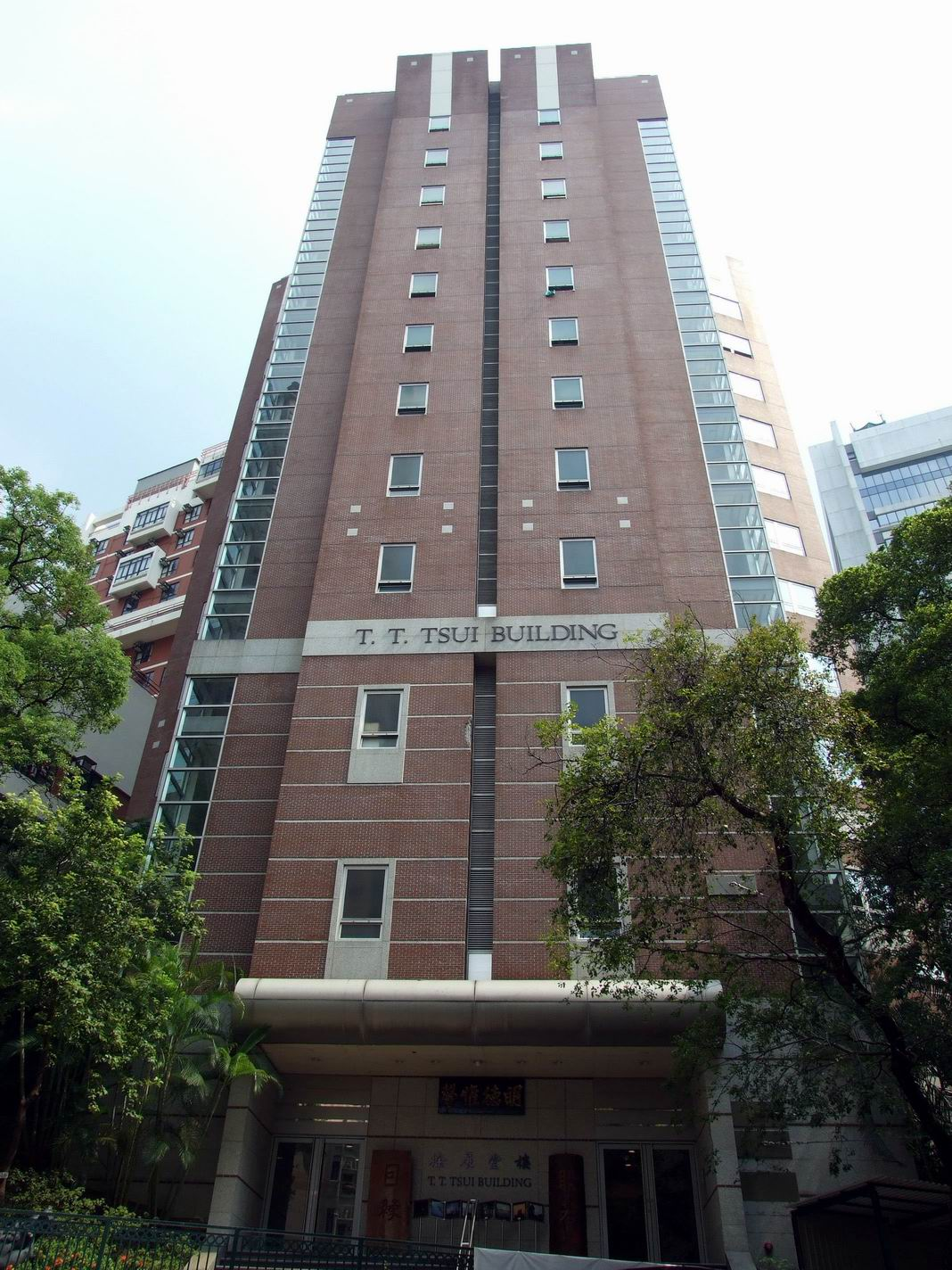
T.T. Tsui Building, the University of Hong Kong, named after Tsui Tsin Tong

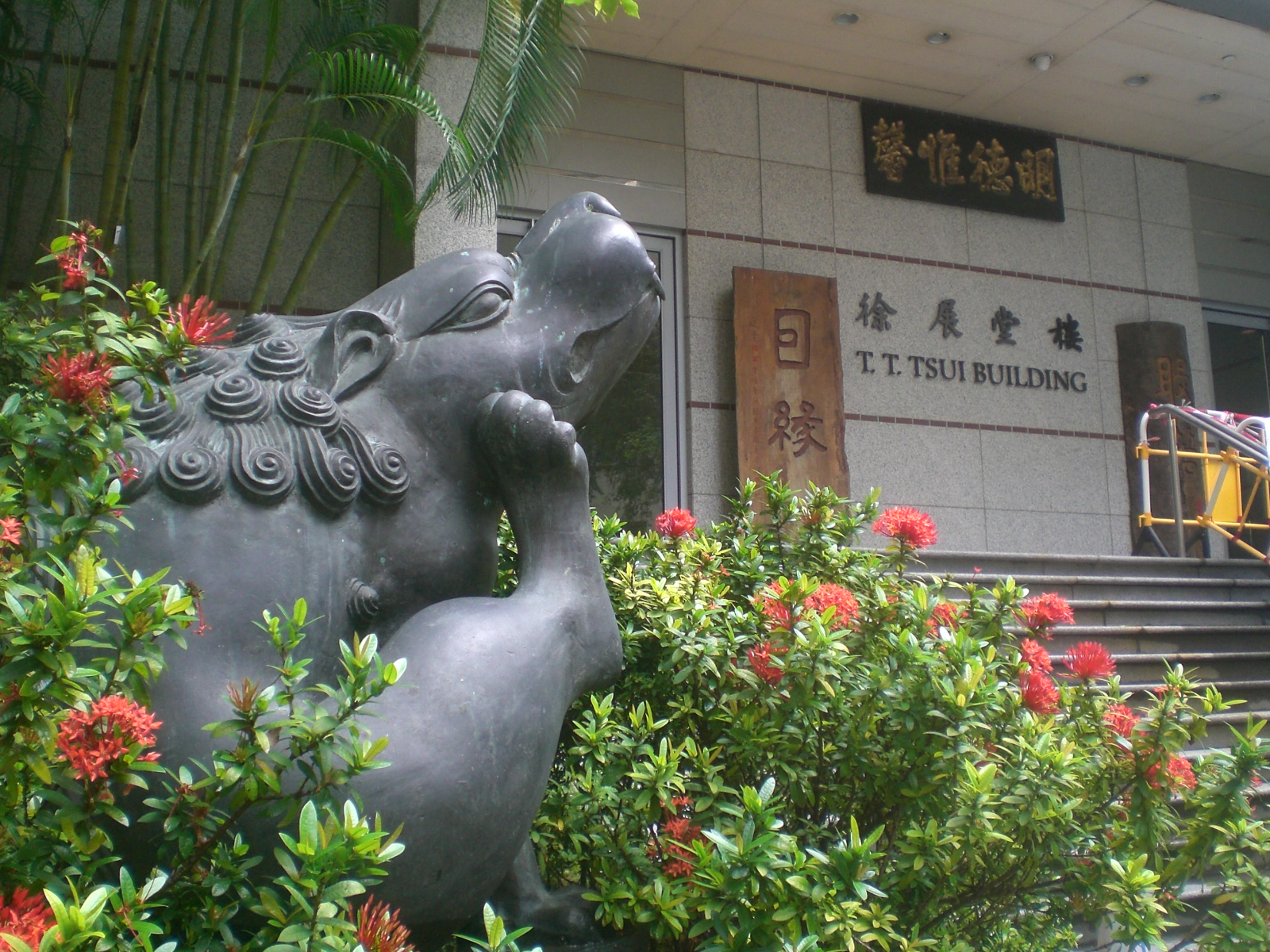
Entrance of T.T. Tsui Building, the University of Hong Kong

Dr. Tsui Tsin-tong GBS JP (1941 – 2 April 2010) was a Hong Kong entrepreneur, philanthropist and an antique connoisseur. He was also a Hong Kong member of the Standing Committee of the Chinese People's Political Consultative Conference.

Tsui was honorary chairman of the Hong Kong-listed company CNT Group, which is engaged in manufacturing and sale of paint products, iron and steel, and property investment.

== Biography ==
Born in Ji'an, Jiangxi in 1941 as a native of Yixing, Jiangsu, he migrated to Hong Kong with his family at the age of nine. His father died when he was 13. He worked as a messenger and a handyman before starting small businesses including restaurants and interior decoration companies. He made his fortune through stock market and property development in the 1970s. His business empire boomed as the properties he bought in the early 1980s surged in value. He later acquired the Chinese paints factories established in Hong Kong, Hong Kong Citybus, London Citybus and expanded the family-owned North Sea Group.

In 1992, he became a member of the 1st Group of Hong Kong Affairs Advisors and made contribution for the Hong Kong transition. In 2001, he was awarded the Gold Bauhinia Star for his contribution to maintaining the prosperity and stability of Hong Kong.

In 1995 Tsui gifted a Tang dynasty tomb figure of a horse to the National Gallery of Australia.

In March 2010, Tsui suddenly suffered a stroke when he attended the 11th Chinese People's Political Consultative Conference in Beijing. In April 2010, he died in Beijing at the age of 69.
