= Tsui Tin-Chau =

Chinese-born Dutchman (born 1958)

- Traditional Chinese: 徐天就
- Simplified Chinese: 徐天就
Transcriptions
Standard Mandarin
- Hanyu Pinyin: Xú Tiānjiù
- Bopomofo: ㄒㄩˊ ㄊ一ㄢˉ ㄐ一ㄡˋ
- Wade–Giles: Hsü T'ien-Ch'iu
Yue: Cantonese
- Yale Romanization: chèuih tín jauh
- Jyutping: ceoi4 tin1 zau6

Tsui Tin-Chau (born 1958 in Hong Kong) is a Chinese-born Dutchman who is well known in the Chinese community in the Netherlands. His ancestral home is Zhongshan, Guangdong. He emigrated to the Netherlands in 1972.

After graduating from secondary school, he completed his studies at the Katholieke pedagogische Academie (Catholic Pedagogical Academy) in Maastricht and his study in Chinese Languages and Cultures at Leiden University.

Tsui teaches Chinese in both secondary and tertiary education. In addition, he develops educational tools and teaching methods for Chinese language courses and Chinese language (weekend) schools. His course Chinees? 'n makkie (Chinese? Piece of cake) is well known. Until 2010, he was a teacher at Eijkhagen College/Charlemagne College in the Dutch province of Limburg.

Tsui is known in the Chinese community in the Netherlands primarily because of the Chinese broadcast on the Dutch channel NPS, snelle berichten Nederland-China (Quick Messages Netherlands-China). From 1996 to 2005, he presented the Dutch course "Aa Laa (alle) dingen Yeung Yeung Sóow/阿啦dingen樣樣數" (“All things Yeung Yeung Sóow/阿啦things樣樣數"). He also presented the course "Dag in dag uit Nederlands/荷语日日讲" (Dutch every day 荷语日日讲). Together with Chow Yiu-Fai, Tsui hosted light-hearted summer programs like "Yauw Moow Kôk Tsôh有冇搅错".

== Publications ==
In addition to teaching methods and educational tools, Tsui has published the following works:

- T.C. Tsui (1995). Chinese Wijsheden en parallelle Nederlandse gezegdes in twee talen (Chinese wisdom and parallel Dutch sayings in two languages)
- Geense, P. & T.C. Tsui (2001). Chinese: In: G. Extra & J.J. de Ruiter (red). Babylon aan de Noordzee. Nieuwe talen in Nederland (Babylon by the North Sea. New languages in the Netherlands).

== See also ==
- Sinology
