= Xu Simin =

The Honourable Tsui Sze-man GBM
- 徐四民
- Born: 3 July 1914; Yangon, Myanmar, British Raj
- Died: 9 September 2007 (aged 93); Queen Mary Hospital, Pok Fu Lam, Hong Kong
- Resting place: Dapeng Bay, Shenzhen, Guangdong
- Education: Xiamen University
- Occupation: Magazine publisher
- Known for: The Mirror

Tsui Sze-man GBM (Chinese: 徐四民; pinyin: Xú Sìmín, 3 July 1914 – 9 September 2007) was a pro-Beijing loyalist and magazine publisher based in Hong Kong. He was nicknamed "Big Cannon Tsui" for his outspoken and sometimes controversial views. He was known as a staunch supporter of Beijing's policies in Hong Kong.

== Early life ==
Tsui was born in 1914 in Burma (present day Myanmar). Despite his birth in Burma, Tsui spent the majority of his life either in mainland China or Hong Kong. Tsui attended school at Xiamen University in Fujian province.

== Career ==
Tsui returned to his birthplace, Burma, in the 1940s and founded the New Rangoon News. He returned to Communist China in 1964. Tsui finally settled permanently in Hong Kong in 1977. Once in Hong Kong, Tsui began publishing The Mirror, a pro-Beijing magazine which supported the policies of the mainland.

Tsui was known for his controversial opinions. In 1998, he heavily criticized RTHK, a Hong Kong government run radio station, for being too critical of the Hong Kong and Chinese administrations. Tsui urged Hong Kong officials to censor RTHK.

Tsui served as a member of the Standing Committee of the Chinese People's Political Consultative Conference, a Hong Kong committee which advises China's congress.

Tsui died of organ failure on 9 September 2007 in Hong Kong at the age of 93. At Tsui's funeral, Gao Siren, Beijing's liaison to Hong Kong praised Tsui for his support of Hong Kong's Basic Law and current "one country, two systems" policy. Mourners included high level officials from China and Hong Kong's governments, including the Chief Executive of Hong Kong, Donald Tsang, the director of China's Hong Kong and Macau affairs office, Liao Hui, and former Hong Kong leader, Tung Chee-hwa. Wreaths and flowers were sent by CPC Politburo Standing Committee members Hu Jintao, Wen Jiabao and Wu Bangguo, the head of China's congress.

Tsui was buried at Dapeng Bay in the city of Shenzhen, China.
