= Choi (Korean surname) =

Korean family name (최)

- Pronunciation: [tɕʰwe] or [tɕʰø]
- Language: Korean

Origin
- Meaning: Best, Top, Most, Pinnacle
- Region of origin: Korea

Other names
- Alternative spelling: Ch'oe, Tsoi, Chye, Chwe, Chey, Chay, Chie, Chei, Chai, Chae, Chea, Chwe
- Variant forms: Cui, Chui, Thôi

- Choi
- Hangul: 최
- Hanja: 崔
- RR: Choe
- MR: Ch'oe

Percentage of family names in South Korea Kim Lee, Yi, Rhee Park, Pak Choi Jung, Jeong, Chung, Cheong

Choi (Korean: 최; Hanja: 崔) is a Korean family surname. As of the South Korean census of 2015, there were around 2.3 million people by this name in South Korea or roughly 4.7% of the population. In English-speaking countries, it is most often anglicized as Choi, and sometimes also Chey, Choe or Chwe. Ethnic Koreans in the former USSR generally prefer the forms Tsoi or Tsoy, especially as a transcription of the Cyrillic Цой.

== Origin ==
- According to Samguk Sagi, the Gyeongju clan originates from chief Sobeoldori (소벌도리; 蘇伐都利) of Goheochon (고허촌; 高墟村), one of six villages that united to found Silla. The Gyeongju clan traces their origin back to Ch'oe Ch'iwŏn (857–10th century), a noted Korean scholar, philosopher, and poet of the late Unified Silla period (668–935).
- One theory of origin suggests that Haeju clan's progenitor Ch'oe Ch'ung (984–1068) was given the surname 崔 during the reign of Goryeo king Mokjong.
- The progenitor of the Chungju clan is General Choi Seung (최승; 崔陞), also known as Choi Woo (최우; 崔偶), of Silla (known as Cui Sheng in the Tang dynasty)
- The progenitor of the Nangju clan is Choi Heun (최흔; 崔昕) of Silla who was a native of Yeongam (Nangju) of the southern Jeolla region.
- Choi Ri (최리; 崔理), who was known as the leader of the Kingdom of Nakrang
- Choi clan was one of the most loyal clans to emperors (I century BC – 1910), as were the Lee, Cheon, Seong, Bae, Sol clans. All of these are legendary surnames given to six villages by third emperor of Silla, Yuri (24–57 AD). This information gives us "Samguk yusa" – "The three kingdoms history", written by monk Iryeon in XIII century.

== Clans ==
There are roughly 160 clans of Chois. Most of these are quite small. However, Choi is the 4th most common surname in Korea. The largest by far is the Gyeongju Choi clan, with a 2000 South Korean population of 976,820. The Gyeongju Choi claim the Silla scholar Ch'oe Ch'iwŏn as their founder.

- Gyeongju clan – Ch'oe Ch'iwŏn
- Jeonju clan – Choe Bu
- Dongju clan

Haeju Choi clan family seal

- Nangju clan - Choi Ji-mong
- Haeju clan – Ch'oe Ch'ung
- Saknyeong clan – Ch'oe Hang, Choi Byung Ju (founding member modern era Korean Supreme Court)
- Gangneung clan
- Hwasun clan
- Ganghwa clan
- Yeongcheon clan
- Tamjin clan
- Ubong clan - Ch'oe Ch'unghŏn
- Suwaon clan
- Yeongheung clan
- Suseong clan
- Chungju Choe clan
- Goesan clan – Ch'oe Sejin
- Heunghae clan
- Yeongam clan
- Taein clan

== Etymology and pronunciation ==
Choi is written with the hanja character 崔, meaning "a governor who oversees the land and the mountain".

In Korean, 최 is usually pronounced [tɕʰwe] "Chwe" or "Chey" except by some older speakers who pronounce it [tɕʰø] (this vowel sound is similar to the German ö [ø]). In Spanish, it is most often pronounced /ˈtʃɔɪ/ "Choy", which differs from its proper pronunciation but some go by "Chey".

== Prominent people of the past ==
- Ch'oe Ch'unghŏn (1149–1219), military dictator of the Goryeo period
- Ch'oe U (1166–1249), military dictator of the Goryeo period
- Ch'oe Musŏn (1330–1395), Korean scientist, inventor, and military commander
- Ch'oe Yŏng (1316–1388), military general of the Goryeo period
- Ch'oe Ch'iwŏn (859–?), Korean philosopher during the Silla dynasty
- Choe Han-gi (1803–1877), Korean Confucian scholar and philosopher
- Choe Je-u (1824–1864), founder of the Donghak movement
- Ch'oe Manli (???–1445), vice director of the Hall of Worthies and early critic of hangul
- Choe Sejin (1465–1542), Korean linguist
- Royal Noble Consort Sukbin Choe (1670–1718), royal consort
- Ch'oe Yŏnggyŏng (1529–1590), scholar-official of the Joseon period

== Prominent people today ==
=== General ===
- Carver Choi (born 2009), American volleyball player
- Dan Choi (born 1981), American LGBT rights activist and former infantry officer
- Choi Gee-sung (born 1951), South Korean businessman
- Hamid Choi, South Korean translator and professor
- Choi Hong-hi, South Korean general and martial artist
- Choi Hyun-seok (born 1972), South Korean chef and television personality
- Jay Pil Choi, American economist
- Choe Jun (1884–1970), businessman and philanthropist
- Choe Nam-seon (1890–1957), Korean historian and independence activist
- Sophia Choi (born 1971), American news broadcaster
- Choi Tae-min (1912–1994), South Korean cult leader
- Chey Tae-won (born 1960), South Korean business magnate
- Choi Wonshik, South Korean optical physicist
- Choi Soon-sil (born 1956), South Korean businesswoman.

=== Politicians ===
- Choe Kwang (1918–1997), North Korean general and politician
- Choi Kyoung-hwan (born 1955), South Korean politician
- Choi Kyu-hah (1919–2006), South Korean politician
- Choe Ryong-hae (born 1950), North Korean politician and military officer
- Choi Sang-mok (born 1963), South Korean politician
- Choe Son-hui, North Korean politician and diplomat
- Sergey Tsoy (born 1957), Russian politician and executive
- Steven Choi (born 1944), American politician
- Choe Yong-gon (official) (1900–1976), North Korean official and politician
- Young Kim (born 1962 as Choe Young Oak), American politician

=== Arts ===
==== General ====
- David Choe (born 1976), American artist
- Choi Han, South Korean voice actor
- Choi Hye-seon (born 1998), South Korean model
- Choi Jongcheon (1954–2025), South Korean poet
- Kristy Choi, Korean-American filmmaker
- Choi Seong-woo (born 1954), South Korean voice actress
- Sharon Choi (born c. 1994), South Korean interpreter and film director
- Choi Soo-jin, South Korean voice actress
- Susan Choi (born 1969), American novelist
- Choi Won-hyeong (born 1968), South Korean voice actor

==== Actors and actresses ====
- Lee Ah-jin (born Choi Ah-jin, 1991), South Korean actress and model
- Choi Bool-am (born 1940), South Korean retired actor and professor
- Choi Cheol-ho (born 1970), South Korean actor
- Choi Dae-chul (born 1978), South Korean actor
- Choi Dae-hoon (born 1980), South Korean actor
- Choi Daniel (born 1986), South Korean actor and DJ
- Choi Deok-moon (born 1970), South Korean actor
- Choi Eun-hee (1926–2018), South Korean actress
- Choi Go (born 2012), South Korean actor and model
- Choi Gwi-hwa (born 1978), South Korean actor
- Choi Han-bit (born 1987), South Korean model and actress
- Choi Hee-jin (born 1996), South Korean actress
- Choi Hee-seo (born 1986), South Korean actress
- Choi Hyun-wook (born 2002), South Korean actor
- Choi Ja-hye (born 1981), South Korean actress
- Choi Jae-rim (born 1985), South Korean musical actor
- Choi Jae-sung (born 1964), South Korean actor
- Choi Ji-woo (born 1975), South Korean actress
- Choi Jin-ho (actor) (born 1968), South Korean actor
- Choi Jin-sil (1968–2008), South Korean actress
- Choi Jin-young (1970–2010), South Korean actor and singer
- Choi Jung-yoon (born 1977), South Korean actress
- Choi Jung-won (actress, born 1969), South Korean actress
- Choi Jung-won (actress, born 1981), South Korean actress
- Choi Jung-woo (1957–2025), South Korean actor
- Choi Jung-woo (actor, born 1995), South Korean actor and model
- Choi Kang-hee (actress) (born 1977), South Korean actress and radio DJ
- Kenneth Choi (born 1971), American actor
- Choi Kwon-soo (born 2004), South Korean actor
- Choi Kyu-jin (actor) (born 1996), South Korean actor
- Choi Min (born 1987), South Korean actor
- Choi Min-chul (born 1976), South Korean actor
- Choi Min-sik (born 1962), South Korean actor
- Choi Min-soo (born 1962), South Korean actor
- Choi Min-yong (born 1977), South Korean actor
- Choi Min-young (born 2002), South Korean actor
- Choi Moo-ryong (1928–1999), South Korean actor
- Choi Myung-bin (born 2008), South Korean actress
- Choi Myung-gil (born 1962), South Korean actress
- Choi Ri (born 1995), South Korean actress
- Choi Soo-in (born 2004), South Korean actress
- Choi Soo-jong (born 1962), South Korean actor
- Choi Sung-eun (born 1996), South Korean actress
- Choi Sung-kook (born 1970), South Korean actor
- Choi Tae-hwan (born 1989), South Korean actor
- Choi Tae-joon (born 1991), South Korean actor and model
- Choi Won-hong (born 2000), South Korean actor
- Choi Won-young (born 1976), South Korean actor
- Choi Woo-hyuk (actor, born 1985), South Korean actor
- Choi Woo-hyuk (actor, born 1997), South Korean actor
- Choi Won-myeong (born 1994), South Korean actor and model
- Choi Woo-shik (born 1990), South Korean-Canadian actor
- Choi Woo-sung (born 1997), South Korean actor
- Choi Woong (born 1986), South Korean actor and model
- Choi Ye-bin (born 1998), South Korean actress
- Choi Yeo-jin (born 1983), South Korean-Canadian model and actress
- Choi Yoo-jung (actress) (born 1976), South Korean retired actress
- Choi Yoon-so (born 1984), South Korean actress
- Choi Yoon-young (born 1986), South Korean actress
- Choi Young-joon (born 1980), South Korean actor and singer

==== Musicians ====
- Choerry (born Choi Ye-rim, 2001) South Korean singer
- Choi Bo-min (entertainer) (born 2000), South Korean actor and singer
- Dasuri Choi (born 1988), South Korean dancer and entertainer
- David Choi (born 1986), American musician
- Seven (South Korean singer) (born Choi Dong-wook, 1984), South Korean singer
- G.NA (born Gina Jane Choi, 1987), Korean-Canadian singer and actress
- Wheesung (born Choi Hwee-sung, 1982), South Korean singer
- Hyojung (born Choi Hyo-jung, 1994), South Korean singer
- Choi Hyun-suk (born 1999), South Korean rapper
- Jennifer Choi, Korean-American violinist
- Jenny Choi, American singer and cellist
- Lia (South Korean singer) (born Choi Ji-su, 2000), South Korean singer
- Sulli (born Choi Jin-ri, 1994–2019), South Korean singer and actress
- Choi Jong-hoon (born 1990), South Korean musician
- Changjo (born Choi Jong-hyun, 1995), South Korean singer
- Zelo (born Choi Jun-hong, 1996), South Korean singer
- Choi Jung-eun (born 2007), South Korean singer, member of girl group Izna
- Choi Jung-hoon (born 1992), South Korean singer-songwriter, member of Jannabi
- Choi Jung-in (born 1980), South Korean singer
- Choi Jung-won (singer) (born 1981), South Korean singer
- Ren (South Korean singer) (born Choi Min-gi, 1995), South Korean actor and singer
- Choi Min-ho (born 1991), South Korean rapper and singer
- Choi Min-hwan (born 1992), South Korean singer and drummer
- S.Coups (born Choi Seung-cheol, 1995), South Korean rapper and singer
- Vernon (rapper) (born Chwe Han-sol, 1998), South Korean rapper and singer
- T.O.P (born Choi Seung-hyun, 1987), South Korean rapper and actor
- Choi Si-won (born 1986), South Korean singer and actor
- Choi Soo-young (born 1990), South Korean singer and actress
- Bada (singer) (born Choi Sung-hee, 1980), South Korean singer and musical theatre actress
- Choi Sung-min (born 1995), South Korean singer
- Theo (South Korean singer) (born Choi Tae-yang, 2001), South Korean singer-songwriter, member of P1Harmony
- Choi Ye-na (born 1999), South Korean singer
- Arin (singer) (born Choi Ye-won, 1999), South Korean singer, member of girl group Oh My Girl
- Choi Yoo-jung (singer) (born 1999), South Korean singer
- Choi Young-jae (born 1996), South Korean singer and actor member of GOT7
- Choi Young-jae (born 2005), South Korean singer and actor member of TWS
- Choi Yu-jin (born 1996), South Korean singer and actress
- Yuju (singer) (born Choi Yu-na, 1997), South Korean singer
- Choi Yu-ree (born 1998), South Korean singer-songwriter
- Viktor Tsoi (1962–1990), Soviet singer-songwriter and actor
- Alexander Tsoi (born 1985), Soviet-Russian singer-songwriter, son of Viktor Tsoi
- Anita Tsoy (born 1971), Russian singer-songwriter
- San (born Choi San, 1999), South Korean singer and dancer, member of Ateez
- Jongho (born Choi Jong-ho, 2000), South Korean singer and actor, member of Ateez
- Yeonjun (born Choi Yeon-jun, 1999), South Korean singer-songwriter, member of Tomorrow X Together
- Soobin (born 2000), South Korean singer-songwriter, member of Tomorrow X Together
- Beomgyu (born Choi Beom-gyu, 2001), South Korean singer-songwriter, member of Tomorrow X Together
- Jiwoo (born Choi Jiwoo, 2006), South Korean singer, member of girl group Hearts2Hearts

=== Sports ===
- Yuhui Choe (born 1986), Japanese-born Korean ballet dancer
- Choi Cheol-han, South Korean professional Go player
- Choe Chol-su (born 1969), North Korean boxer
- Choi Da-bin (born 2000), South Korean figure skater
- Choi Eun-kyung (field hockey) (born 1971), South Korean former field hockey player
- Choi Eun-kyung (born 1984), South Korean short track speed skater
- Choi Ga-on (born 2008), South Korean snowboarder
- Hee-seop Choi (born 1979), South Korean former professional baseball player
- Hongman Choi (born 1980), South Korean kickboxer and mixed martial artist
- Ji-man Choi (born 1991), South Korean professional baseball player
- Choi Jin-cheul (born 1971), South Korean football manager and former player
- Choi Jung-won (speed skater) (born 1990), South Korean short track speed skater
- Choi Kwang-jo (born 1942), South Korean martial artist
- K. J. Choi (born Choi Kyung-Ju, 1970), South Korean professional golfer
- Choi Mi-sun (born 1966), South Korean recurve archer
- Choe Myong-ho (born 1988), North Korean footballer
- Choi Myung-hoon (born 1975), South Korean professional Go player
- Choi Na-yeon (born 1987), South Korean professional golfer
- Choi Seung-yong (baseball) (born 2001), South Korean baseball player
- Choi Seung-yong (speed skater) (born 1980), South Korean speed skater
- Choi Soon-ho (born 1962), South Korean football manager and former player
- Choe Song-hyok (born 1998), North Korean footballer
- Choi Sung-beom (born 2001), South Korean footballer
- Choi Sung-kuk (born 1983), South Korean former footballer
- Choi Sung-yong (born 1975), South Korean former footballer
- Choi Tae-uk (born 1981), South Korean former footballer
- Choi Won-jong (born 1978), South Korean archer
- Choi Won-kwon (born 1981), South Korean former footballer
- Mas Oyama (born Choi Yeong-eui, 1923–1994), South Korean karate master
- iloveoov (born Choi Yeon-sung, c. 1983), South Korean retired professional StarCraft player
- Choi Yong-soo (boxer) (1972), South Korean retired boxer
- Choi Yong-soo (born 1973), South Korean footballer
- Choi Yong-sool (1904–1986), South Korean martial artist
- Choi Yu-jin (figure skater) (born 2000), South Korean figure skater
- Choi Yun-kyum (born 1962), South Korean football manager
- Choi Woo-je (born 2004), South Korean professional League of Legends player
- Choi Hyeon-joon (born 2000), South Korean professional League of Legends player

== See also ==
- Cui – Mainland China Surname
- Chui – Hong Kong Surname
- Choi (disambiguation)
- Tsoi (disambiguation)
- List of Korean family names
