= Cui (surname) =

Cuī
- Romanization: Mandarin: Cui (Pinyin); Ts'ui (Wade-Giles), Tsui (Wade-Giles); Anglicized: Tsway, Tuai; Korean: Choi; Cyrillic: Tsoi; Cantonese: Chui (Hong Kong and Macao), Choi (Macao, Malaysia); Vietnamese: Thôi
- Language: Chinese

Origin
- Language: Old Chinese
- Meaning: precipitous, high mountain

Cui (Chinese: 崔; pinyin: Cuī; Wade–Giles: Ts'ui), alternatively spelled Tsui or Tsway, is one of the 80 most common surnames in China, with around 0.28% of the Chinese population having the surname (around 3.4 million in 2002). It is also one of the most common surnames in Korea, with around 4.7% of the population having the surname in South Korea (2.4 million in 2013).

In China, Cui is commonly found in Shandong and Henan, as well as provinces in the northeast and other areas of China, such as Heilongjiang, Liaoning, Hebei, Jiangsu, Shanxi, and Jilin. It is romanized as Chui in Hong Kong and Macao (Cantonese), Choi in Macao (Cantonese) and Malaysia, Choi in Korean, Thôi in Vietnamese and Tsoi in Cyrillic.

Unrelated to the Chinese surname, Cui was also used by Russian composer César Cui as the romanization of the Russian name Це́зарь Кюи́ (Tsézar' Kyuí). In his case, the surname originated as a Russification of the French surname Queuille.

== Origin ==
One origin of the surname came from descendants of someone who originally held the Jiang (姜) surname in the state of Qi, founded by Jiang Ziya (姜子牙). A grandson of Jiang Ziya named Jizi (季子), an heir apparent, chose to relinquish his claim to the throne in favour of his brother Shuyi (叔乙), and went to live in the Cui estate (崔邑, in present-day Zhangqiu, Shandong). His descendants later adopted Cui as their surname.

During the Tang dynasty the Li family of Zhaojun (赵郡李氏), the Cui family of Boling (博陵崔氏), the Cui family of Qinghe (清河崔氏), the Lu family of Fanyang (范陽盧氏), the Zheng family of Xingyang (荥阳郑氏), the Wang family of Taiyuan (太原王氏), and the Li family of Longxi (隴西李氏) were the seven noble families between whom marriage was banned by law. Moriya Mitsuo wrote a history of the Later Han-Tang period of the Taiyuan Wang. Among the strongest families was the Taiyuan Wang. The prohibition on marriage between the clans issued in 659 by the Gaozong Emperor was flouted by the seven families since a woman of the Boling Cui married a member of the Taiyuan Wang, giving birth to the poet Wang Wei. He was the son of Wang Chulian who in turn was the son of Wang Zhou. The marriages between the families were performed clandestinely after the prohibition was implemented on the seven families by Gaozong. Their status as "Seven Great surnames" became known during Gaozong's rule.

The surname is one of the five surnames, now the most common surnames in Korea, closely associated with the six villages that formed the earliest state of Silla.

Many non-Han Chinese groups adopted the surname Cui. During the Qing dynasty, the Manchu clans Cuigiya Hala (sinicized as 崔佳氏) and Cuimulu Hala (崔穆鲁氏) simplified their names to Cui. The Manchu Cuigiya 崔佳氏 clan claimed that a Han Chinese founded their clan. A Mongol clan Cuijuk Hala (崔珠克氏) also adopted this surname during the Qing dynasty. The surname may also be found amongst the Tujia (土家) people in Hunan, the Yi (彝) people in Yunnan, as well as the Mongols and Hui (回) people.

== List of notable people ==
=== Historical ===
- Cui Yuan (Han dynasty) (77–142 or 78–143 AD), a minor figure from the Han dynasty
- Cui Yan (163 - 216), an official from late Eastern Han dynasty
- Lady Cui (Cao Wei), a noble woman from the Three Kingdoms period
- Cui Hao (d. 450), a statesman of the 5th century, Qinghe Cui family
- Cui Renshi (c. 580 – 649), a chancellor during the Tang dynasty
- Cui Dunli (596–656), a general and diplomat during the Tang dynasty
- Cui Zhiwen (627–683), a chancellor during the Tang dynasty
- Cui Shi (671–713), an official of the Tang dynasty, grandson of Cui Renshi
- Cui Cha (d. 689), a chancellor of the Tang dynasty
- Cui Hao (poet) (704–754), a poet
- Cui Yuan (705–768) (705–768), an official of the Chinese dynasty Tang dynasty
- Cui Riyong (673–722), an official of the Tang dynasty
- Cui Shenji, a chancellor during the Tang dynasty
- Cui Xuanwei (638–706), a chancellor during the Tang dynasty
- Cui Bai (mid 11th century), a Song dynasty painter
- Cui Zizhong (died 1644), a painter during the Ming dynasty
- Cui Yuanzong, chancellor during the Tang dynasty

=== Contemporary ===
- Daniel Tsui (b. 1939), Nobel Prize winner in Physics
- Cui Chenxi (b. 2009), Chinese skateboarder
- Cui Daoyi (1934–2022), Chinese literary editor, writer and literary critic
- Cui Daozhi (b. 1934), Chinese forensic scientist
- Cui Guanghao (b. 1979), Chinese football player
- Cui Jian (b. 1961), rock musician known for the hit single "Nothing to My Name"
- Cui Jinming (b. 1992), Chinese basketball player
- Cui Peng (b. 1987), Chinese football player
- Elizabeth Cui (b. 1997), diver from New Zealand
- Victor Cui, ONE Fighting Championship CEO
- Shuguang Cui, American engineer
- Cui Tao (businessman), Laobian Dumpling CEO
- Cui Tiankai, Chinese diplomat
- Cui Xiaodi (b. 1989), Chinese ski mountaineer
- Cui Xingwu (1885–1948), officer in the army in the Second Sino-Japanese War
- Cui Yajie, Chinese engineer murdered in Singapore
- Cui Yingjie (b. 1983), migrant worker and convicted murderer
- Cui Yongyuan (b. 1963), talk show host
- Cui Yuying (b. 1958), high-ranking propaganda official of Tibetan descent
- Cui Zhide (b. 1983), Chinese race walker
- Cui Zhiyuan (b. 1963), professor at Tsinghua University
- Cui Zi'en, film director and writer
- Jorge Maria Cui, Filipino Secretary General of the Boy Scouts of the Philippines 1975–1980
- Tsui Teh-li, member of the executive board of the Boy Scouts of China, 1980s
- Cui Wei, Officer in the U.S. Space Force

== See also ==
- Choi (Korean version of the same surname)
- Chui, occasional Cantonese romanization
- Takashi, Japanese given name for the photographer Takashi Okamura
