= List of Koryo-saram =

This is a list of Koryo-saram, also known as Goryeo-saram or Soviet Koreans—the descendants of Korean immigrants to the Russian Far East who were deported to Central Asia in 1937.

== In academia ==
- Viktor Aleksandrovich Em, Professor, Doctor of Economy, Head of Tashkent Institute of Irrigation and Melioration.
- German Kim, head of the Department of Korean Studies at Al-Farabi University, Kazakhstan, and a leading scholar in the history of Koryo saram.
- Boris Dmitrievich Pak, Professor, Doctor of Historical Sciences, Honored Scientific Worker of Russian Federation, academician of Russian Academy of Humanities, Main Research Scholar Institute of Oriental Studies Russian Academy of Sciences.
- Bella Borisovna Pak, the first Russian Korean woman - Doctor of Historical Sciences, Leading Research Scholar Institute of Oriental Studies Russian Academy of Sciences, the chief editor of the series "Russian Koreans.".
- Andrey Insunovich Pak, Uzbekistani geologist of Koryo-saram descent, Doctor of Geological and Mineralogical Sciences, Lenin Prize winner.
- Georgy Vasilyevich Kan Professor, Doctor of Historical Sciences, Head of the Literary Department of the State Republican Academic Korean Theater Kazakhstan

== In business ==
- Tatyana Kim, Russian businesswoman of Korean ethnicity, founder of Wildberries
- Vladimir Kim, billionaire businessman from Kazakhstan

== In cultural fields ==
- Alexander Kan, North Korea-born Russian-language fiction writer, born in Pyongyang, North Korea.
- Anatoly Andreevich Kim, Russian-language fiction writer.
- Gennady Kim, Uzbekistan-born Kazakhstan guitarist, composer.
- Gong Cha Mun, Russian-born Kazakhstan singer.
- Katya Jones, Russian/British dancer.
- Marina Kim, TV news anchor and journalist. (Korean father)
- Mikhail Pak, Russian novelist.
- Roman Kim, one of the top contestants on Kazakhstani entertainment programme SuperStar KZ.
- Yuliy Kim, singer-songwriter. (Korean father)
- Aleksandr Khvan, Russian film director and actor. (Korean father)
- Dragon Lee (Vyachaslev Yaksysnyi/Вячеслав Ясинский), actor and practitioner of Taekwondo and hapkido, born in North Korea.
- Pavlo Lee "Pasha Lee" (Павло Романович Лі), Ukrainian actor and television presenter, son of a Koryo-saram father and a Russian mother
- Lyudmila Nam, Kazakhstan-born Russian mezzo-soprano.
- Nikolai Shin, Uzbekistani painter.
- Lavrenti Son, Russian and Korean-language playwright.
- Anita Tsoy, popular singer-songwriter.
- Sergey Tsoy, Russian violinist.
- Viktor Tsoi, son of a Koryo-saram father and a Russian mother, lead singer of the Russian band Kino and a major figure in the development of the Soviet rock scene in the 1980s.
- Roman Park (Aron), rapper with the Q-pop group Madmen (Korean-Russian descent)
- Polina Bogusevich, singer, winner of the Junior Eurovision Song Contest 2017
- Lomon (Park Solomon), Uzbekistan-born South Korean actor (later on chose South Korean nationality).
- Yuri Park, Uzbekistan-born South Korean model and rapper, former Produce X 101 contestant (rank 42nd).
- Georgy Mikhailovich Kan (1916–1987), Soviet theater artist. Honored Artist of the Kazakh SSR (1956)

== In military ==
- Hong Beom-do (홍범도) was a Korean independence activist and general, won 60 victories in 60 battles against the Japanese army at the Battle of Fengwudong, Battle of Samdunja and Battle of Qingshanli.
- Yury Pavlovich Em, Russian Major General, Hero of the Russian Federation (conferred May 6, 2000). His father, Dyun Wo Em, is a recipient of the Order of the Red Banner.
- Yevgeny Ivanovich Kim (February 27, 1932 – November 1998), KGB colonel. Once Hero of the Soviet Union (conferred December 21, 1987; Ukaz № 11562).
- Vyacheslav Il'ich Kim, Russian Major General, Deputy Commander of the Black Sea Fleet.
- Aleksandr Pavlovich Min, Soviet military captain. Once Hero of the Soviet Union (conferred Mar 24, 1945) and Order of Lenin recipient.
- Mikhail Ivanovich Kan (1910–1961), soviet lieutenant colonel with General powers
- Oleg Grigoryevich Tsoy, Soviet Air Force officer and test pilot, Hero of the Russian Federation (conferred Apr 16, 1997; Ukaz № 358).
- Boris Yugai, Kyrgyz Chief of the General Staff.
- Semyon Vasilevich Kan (1905-1990), lieutenant colonel, participant in the 1941 parade on Red Square in Moscow

== In politics ==
- Alexey Tsoi, Kazakhstani politician who is serving as the Minister of Healthcare
- Chung Il-kwon, Prime Minister of South Korea (1964–1970)
- Vitaly Fen, Uzbekistan's ambassador to South Korea since November 12, 1999.
- Valery Kan, the youngest person ever elected to the Ussuriysk Duma.
- Alexandra Kim, the first Korean communist.
- Kim Pen Hwa (Ким Пен Хва/김병화), twice Hero of Socialist Labor and four times Order of Lenin recipient.
- Georgy Vladimirovich Kim, former Minister of Justice of the Republic of Kazakhstan (January 29, 2002 – February 25, 2003). Now deputy Prosecutor General – Chairman of the Committee on Legal Statistics and Special Accounting of the Republic of Kazakhstan.
- Nikolai Fedorovich Kan, CPSU party organizer in Kyzyl Orda, People's judge
- Mikhail Kim, delegate to the 17th Congress of the Communist Party of the Soviet Union
- Mihhail Kõlvart, Estonian politician, mayor of Tallinn
- Sergey Tsoy, Moscow Mayor press-secretary
- Sin Alexander Chensanovich, Ukrainian politician mayor of the city of Zaporozhye
- Lubomir Tyan, State Duma member, agricultural businessman
- Vitaliy Kim, Ukrainian politician, Governor of Mykolaiv Oblast (Korean father)

== In sports ==
- Mikhail An, Soviet international footballer.
- Dmitry Bivol, Russian boxer, WBA light-heavyweight champion, of Moldovan and Korean descent.
- Gennady Golovkin, Kazakhstani boxer, WBA and IBO middleweight champion, son of a Russian father and Korean mother
- Alexey Kim, chess grandmaster of Koryo-saram descent.
- Nellie Kim, Olympic gold medal gymnast, born to a Korean father and Tatar mother.
- Alexandra Le, Olympic bronze medal shooter
- Sergey Lim, Uzbekistani and Kazakhstani judo and sambo player.
- Eduard Son, Soviet footballer, Soviet Top League champion in 1988
- Denis Ten, Kazakhstani Olympic figure skater.
- Svetlana Kan, World champion in Taekwondo, 8 dan World Taekwondo
- Kostya Tszyu, Australian boxer of Russian, Korean and Mongol descent.
- Sergey Tsoy, Uzbekistani Olympic swimmer.
- Igor Son, a Kazakhstani Olympic weightlifter.
- Pyotr Ten, Russian former football player.
