= Kwang-ho =

- Hangul: 광호
- RR: Gwangho
- MR: Kwangho

Kwang-ho is a Korean given name.

People with this name include:

- Jo Kwanwoo (born 1965 as Jo Kwangho), South Korean singer
- Cui Guanghao (born 1979), Chinese football player of Korean descent
- Hong Kwang-ho (born 1982), South Korean musical theatre actor
- Kim Kwang-ho (born 1988), North Korean ice hockey player, captain of the North Korea men's national ice hockey team
- Shin Kwangho, South Korean artist
- Jeong Gwang-ho, South Korean politician; see List of members of the South Korean Constituent Assembly, 1948–1950
- Byeon Gwang-ho, South Korean politician; see List of members of the National Assembly (South Korea), 1950–1954
- Chon Kwang-ho, North Korean politician; see 2014 North Korean parliamentary election

Fictional characters with this name include:

- Kim Kwang-ho, character in 2005 South Korean film Bravo, My Life

== See also ==
- List of Korean given names
