= Traces of Justice =

2026 film directed by Chen Sicheng

- Theatrical release poster
- Simplified Chinese: 神探之痕迹
- Hanyu Pinyin: Shéntàn zhī hénjì
- Directed by: Chen Sicheng
- Written by: Chen Sicheng; Zhang Ji; Hui Zijie
- Starring: Zhang Yi; Ma Li; Chen Minghao; Wang Junkai; Fan Chengcheng; Arthur Chen
- Cinematography: Cao Yu
- Production companies: New Classics Media; As One Production; Tianjin Maoyan Weiying Culture Media; Anrui Media
- Distributed by: Maoyan Entertainment
- Release date: October 1, 2026
- Running time: 140 minutes
- Country: China
- Language: Mandarin
- Box office: $109.6 million

Traces of Justice (Chinese: 神探之痕迹) is a 2026 Chinese crime drama film directed by Chen Sicheng. It stars Zhang Yi, Ma Li, and Chen Minghao, alongside Wang Junkai, Fan Chengcheng, and Arthur Chen. Based on the experiences of forensic expert Cui Daozhi, the film dramatizes several major criminal investigations based on real-life cases.

Traces of Justice was theatrically released in China on October 1, 2026.

== Synopsis ==
In 2016, a notorious series of murders that had shocked the nation is finally solved, with the suspect confessing to the crimes. However, one case remains unresolved due to a lack of conclusive physical evidence.

On the verge of retirement, veteran criminal investigation expert Cui Xun is invited to assist with the investigation. A small fingerprint reminds him of several major cases he had handled throughout his career, including a series of sexual assaults, a mass murder and robbery in 1983, and a bus bombing. Across different eras, guided by his professional motto that "physical evidence never lies", he continues to search for the truth through the smallest traces of evidence.

== Cast ==
- Zhang Yi as Cui Xun, based on Cui Daozhi
  - Li Xuejian as elderly Cui Xun
- Ma Li as Huang Rende, a forensic pathologist
- Chen Minghao as Wang Weiguo, criminal investigation chief
- Wang Junkai as Ye Zhongcheng, a police officer
  - Li Naiwen as middle-aged Ye Zhongcheng
- Fan Chengcheng as Qi Xiaolong, Cui Xun's apprentice
- Arthur Chen as Ma Chaoyang, son of a high-ranking official
- Li Yixiang as Gao Mingyong, based on Gao Chengyong
- Wang Qianyuan as Bai Yushan, based on Bai Baoshan

== Production ==
Traces of Justice is based on the experiences of Cui Daozhi, a firearms and ballistic evidence identification expert. It is adapted from the novel 中国神探——共和国刑警崔道植 (China's Sherlock Holmes: People's Republic of China Criminal Investigator Cui Daozhi). Faithfully recreating the historical settings and forensic investigation techniques of the respective periods, Traces of Justice takes the perspective of a forensic evidence examination expert and depicts the investigations and solving of several major criminal cases based on real-life events.

Traces of Justice began production in Harbin in September 2025. Principal photography lasted approximately two months and wrapped in November of the same year.

== Release ==
On September 16, 2026, Traces of Justice was officially announced for release in China on October 1. Trinity CineAsia acquired distribution rights for the United Kingdom, Ireland and Malta from Blossoms Entertainment, scheduling its UK and Ireland theatrical release for October 30, with preview screenings beginning October 17.

== Reception ==
Mike McCahill of The Guardian described it as an effective crime thriller combining forensic investigations with a broader account of the development of Chinese law enforcement. He praised its storytelling and action sequences, as well as Zhang's performance. However, he noted that the protagonist's personal life receives relatively little attention and observed that the film's conclusion connects the development of forensic science to China's contemporary surveillance systems.
