= Choy =

Choy may refer to:

== People ==
- Choy, Cantonese Chinese or version of Cai (surname)
- Choy, a Malayalee surname, sometimes spelled as Choyee or Choyi

== Arts, entertainment, and media ==
- CHOY-FM, a radio station in Moncton, New Brunswick, Canada
- CHOY-TV, a defunct TV station in Saint-Jérôme, Quebec, Canada

== See also ==
- Bok choy
- Cai (disambiguation)
- Choi (disambiguation)
- Chōyō, Kumamoto, village in Aso District, Kumamoto of Japan
- Choysky District, Altai Republic of Russia
- Tsoy (disambiguation)
