= Choi =

Choi may refer to:

- Choi (Korean surname), a Korean surname
- Choi, Macau Cantonese transliteration of the Chinese surname Cui (崔) and Xu (徐)
- Choi, Cantonese romanisation of Cai (surname) (蔡), a Chinese surname
- CHOI-FM, a radio station in Quebec City, Canada
- Choi Bounge, a character from the King of Fighters video game series
- Children's Hospital of Illinois

== See also ==
- Choy (disambiguation)
- Pak choi
