= Ch'oe Ŏnwi =

Korean minister and artist (868–944)

- Hangul: 최언위
- Hanja: 崔彦撝
- RR: Choe Eonwi
- MR: Ch'oe Ŏnwi

Ch'oe Ŏnwi (Korean: 최언위; Hanja: 崔彦撝; 868–944) was a Korean civil minister and calligrapher from the Gyeongju Ch'oe clan during the end of Silla and the next ruling state, Goryeo. He was referred to as one of "the three Ch'oes" along with Ch'oe Ch'iwŏn, a renowned scholar, and Ch'oe Sŭngu. In 885, he went to Tang China to study, and passed a civil examination there. Ch'oe, however, returned to Korea 909. After Silla was collapsed and integrated into Goryeo, he served as the titles of Taeja sabu, and Munhan and others. His calligraphic works include Nangwŏn taesa ojint'appimyŏng (朗圓大師悟眞塔碑銘) and the epitaph on the stupa for Master Jinghyo at Heungnyeongsa temple in Yeongwol.

== See also ==
- Ch'oe Ch'iwŏn
- Ch'oe Hang
