= Cui Daozhi =

Chinese forensic scientist (born 1934)

- 崔道植 최도식
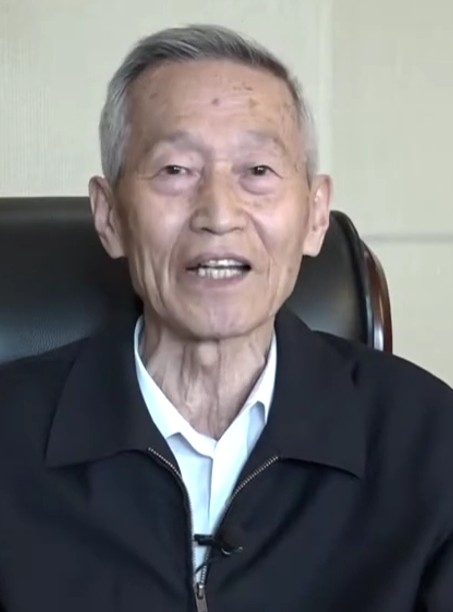
- Cui in 2019
- Born: June 1934 (age 92); Hailong County, Fengtian, Manchukuo (present-day Meihekou, Jilin, China)
- Occupation: Forensic scientist
- Spouse: Jin Yuzhin
- Children: 3
- Military career
- Branch: People's Volunteer Army
- Service years: 1951–1955
- Conflicts: Korean War

Chinese name
- Simplified Chinese: 崔道植
- Traditional Chinese: 崔道植
Transcriptions
Standard Mandarin
- Hanyu Pinyin: Cuī Dàozhí

Chinese Korean name
- Chosŏn'gŭl: 최도식
Transcriptions
- Revised Romanization: Choe Dosik
- McCune–Reischauer: Ch'oe Tosik

Cui Daozhi (Chinese: 崔道植; Korean: 최도식; born June 1934) is a Chinese forensic scientist renowned for his expertise in trace evidence and ballistic identification. Recognized as one of China's first specially invited criminal investigation experts by the Ministry of Public Security, Cui is celebrated as China's foremost expert in firearm and ballistic trace identification. Over his 60-year career in criminal investigation, he handled over 1200 major cases, conducting more than 7000 trace evidence analyses.

== Early life ==
Cui Daozhi was born in June 1934 in Hailong County, then part of Fengtian Province under the Japanese puppet state of Manchukuo (now Meihekou in Jilin, China), to a tenant farmer family of Korean ethnicity. He lost his father at age four and his mother at age six, after which he and his elder sister were raised by their grandfather. Following the Soviet invasion of Manchuria in 1945, he began attending school with government support and later became the leader of a children's group. During the Korean War in 1951, he enlisted in the Chinese People's Volunteer Army, serving in a translation training unit. On 6 December 1953, he joined the Chinese Communist Party. His performance led to his promotion to platoon leader in 1955.

== Career ==
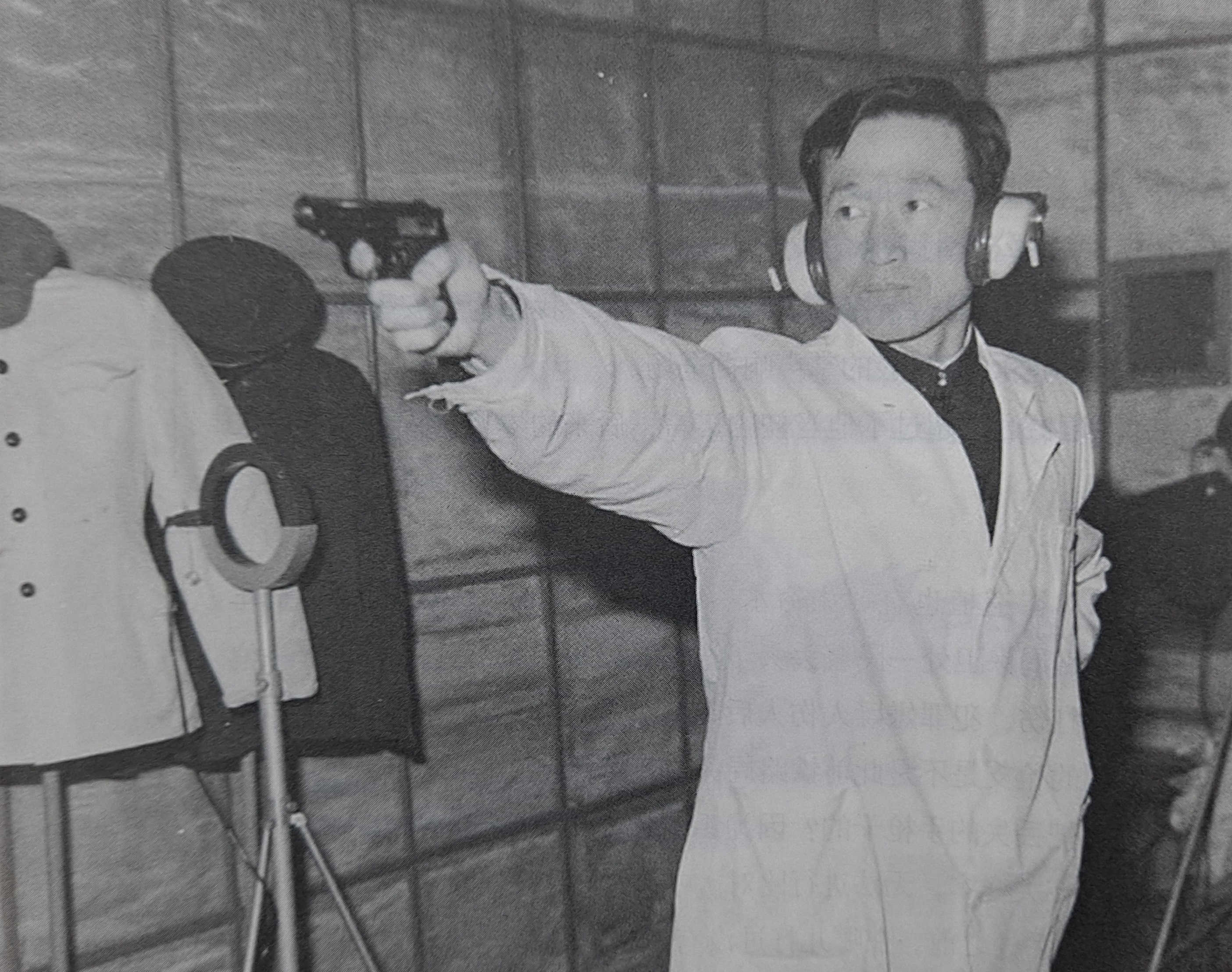
Cui as an expert in ballistic identification

In 1955, Cui transitioned from the military to the Heilongjiang Provincial Public Security Department. From 1957 to 1959, he studied trace evidence analysis at the First People's Police Cadre School of the Ministry of Public Security (now Criminal Investigation Police University of China), becoming one of China's first students in this field and Heilongjiang's sole criminal investigation technician at the time. During his studies, he received the "Advanced Technical Revolutionary" award. He later pursued further education at Harbin Amateur Workers' University and Harbin Medical University to enhance his criminal investigation knowledge. After the Cultural Revolution, he was promoted to head of the Trace Evidence Section.

In the early 1970s and 1981, in an era without DNA technology, Cui solved two homicide cases in Harbin and Mudanjiang by analyzing bite marks on a victim's face and fingernail fragments left in a victim's abdomen, pioneering the use of bite marks and fingernails for identification in complex cases. In 1975, he collaborated with researchers from four provinces on a four-year study titled The Relationship Between Hand Dimensions, Height, Age, and Body Type (Chinese: 人手各部位长度宽度与身高、年龄、体态的关系; pinyin: Rénshǒu gè bùwèi chángdù kuāndù yǔ shēngāo, niánlíng, tǐtài de guānxì). Starting in 1981, he authored several influential papers regarding ballistic trace identification which were published in Ministry of Public Security textbooks and presented at the 10th Interpol Conference in 2024. In 1992, Cui was appointed Director of the Criminal Technology Division at Heilongjiang Provincial Public Security Department. That same year, he received a national certificate for outstanding scientific contributions from the State Council and was granted a special government allowance.

Despite his retirement in 1994, he was rehired between 1996 and 1997, he analyzed ballistic evidence in a series of armed assaults and robberies in Xinjiang and Beijing, designated as China's "No. 1 Criminal Investigation Case" of 1997 and the third most significant case globally by Interpol. His analysis confirmed that bullets and casings from both locations were fired from the same Type 81 rifle, identifying the suspect as an individual transferred from Beijing to serve a sentence in Xinjiang. Within a week, his findings led to the arrest of the perpetrator Bai Baoshan. Cui also provided critical technical analysis for major cases including the Baiyin serial murders and the Zhang Jun robbery-murder cases. In September 1999, Cui was appointed one of the Ministry of Public Security's first specially invited criminal investigation experts.

== Personal life ==
Cui is married to Jin Yuyin. The couple has three sons who currently work at the public security bureau.

== Titles and honors ==
Due to his investigative skills and contributions to forensics, Cui has been referred to as the Chinese Sherlock Holmes. His honors and titles include:

- National Public Security Science and Technology Outstanding Contribution Award (2006)
- 40th Anniversary of Reform and Opening Up Political and Legal System News Influential Figure (2018)
- First-class Heroic Model of the National Public Security System (2019)
- The Most Beautiful Struggler (2019)
- July 1 Medal (2021) (Note: Only recipient from the public security field to receive this honor.)

== In popular culture ==
In the 2024 television series We Are Criminal Police, the character Cao Zhongshu, a trace examination expert, is based on Cui. In the 2026 film Traces of Justice, the protagonist Cui Xun, a veteran criminal investigation expert, is also based on Cui.

== Bibliography ==
- Cao, Qinfa (2021). Bǎinián dà dǎngqí zhèng hóng qīyī xūnzhāng huòdé zhě fēngcǎi lù 百年大党旗正红 七一勋章获得者风采录 [A Century of Great Party Flags: A Record of July 1st Medal Winners] (in Chinese). Beijing: Zhōngyāng wénxiàn chūbǎn shè. ISBN 9787507348347.
- Cheng, Hongbao; Chen, Zhihuan (2022). Rénmín gōng'ān wéi rénmín hóngyáng yīngmó jīngshén zhù láo zhōngchéng jǐng hún 人民公安为人民 弘扬英模精神筑牢忠诚警魂 [People's Police Serve the People, Carry Forward the Spirit of Heroes and Models, and Build a Loyal Police Soul] (in Chinese). Fuzhou: Fújiàn rénmín chūbǎn shè. ISBN 9787211088867.
- Feng, Rui (2020). Gònghéguó xíngjǐng cuīdàozhí 共和国刑警崔道植 [Cui Daozhi, Criminal Policeman of the Republic] (in Chinese). Beijing: Qúnzhòng chūbǎn shè. ISBN 9787501460274.
