= Cui clan of Boling =

The Cui clan of Boling (博陵崔氏) was a notable Chinese clan of noble descent which was politically active from the Han dynasty to the end of the Five Dynasties and Ten Kingdoms period. They shared the same ancestry as the Cui clan of Qinghe. The founding father of this clan, Cui Zhongmou (崔仲牟), was a younger brother of Cui Ye (崔業), the founding father of the Cui clan of Qinghe. Their father, Jizi (季子), was the common ancestor of these two clans.

The Cui clan of Boling traditionally lived in Boling Commandery, which covered parts of present-day Hebei. Members of this clan served as officials in the government of the Han dynasty. Although there were many famous Confucian scholars from the Cui family, they did not have any significant political influence until the late Six Dynasties era.

During the Sui and Tang dynasties, the Cui clan of Boling became so influential that when Emperor Taizong of the Tang dynasty once asked a minister which was the most influential clan of that time, the minister replied that it was the Cui family of Boling. The emperor felt displeased because he thought that the Li family, the imperial family, should be the most prestigious one in his time. In total, there were 15 members from the Cui family of Boling who held the position of chancellor during the Tang dynasty, and one during the Five Dynasties and Ten Kingdoms period.

It is not known what happened to the Cui clan of Boling after the establishment of the Song dynasty as nothing was recorded about them in historical records. It is clear, however, that most of the notable Chinese clans suffered from the wars in the Five Dynasties and Ten Kingdoms era, and many of them were no longer mentioned in historical records again after that period.

== Branches ==
These were the branches of the Cui clan of Boling.

- Boling Anping branch (博陵安平房)
- Elder Boling branch (博陵大房)
- Second Boling branch (博陵第二房)
- Third Boling branch (博陵第三房)
- Fourth Boling branch (博陵第四房)
- Fifth Boling branch (博陵第五房)
- Sixth Boling branch (博陵第六房)

== Notable figures ==
=== Males ===
- Cui Yin (崔駰) – scholar and writer during the Eastern Han dynasty
- Cui Hong (崔洪) – minister during the Jin dynasty (266–420)
- Cui Bing (崔秉) – general during the Western Wei dynasty
- Cui Renshi (崔仁師) – official of the Tang dynasty the who briefly served as a chancellor late in the reign of Emperor Taizong
- Cui Shi (崔湜; 671–713) – Chinese writer and politician. He served as an official of the Chinese Tang dynasty and Wu Zetian's Zhou dynasty, serving as a chancellor during the reigns of Wu Zetian's sons Emperor Zhongzong and Emperor Ruizong and grandsons Emperor Shang and Emperor Xuanzong
- Cui Xuanwei, Prince Wenxian of Boling (博陵文獻王 崔玄暐; 638–706) – serving as a chancellor during the reigns of Wu Zetian and her son Emperor Zhongzong
- Cui Huan (崔渙) (died January 14, 769[1]) was a Chinese politician during the Tang dynasty, serving as a chancellor briefly during the reign of Emperor Suzong

=== Female ===
==== Imperial Concubines ====
- Princess Consort of Henan, of the Cui clan of Boling (河南王妃 博陵崔氏), wife of Yang Zhao, Crown Prince Yuande
- Princess Consort Cui, of the Cui clan of Boling ( 崔妃博陵崔氏; d. 600), wife of Yang Jun, Prince Xiao of Qin and mother of Yang Hao and Yang Zhi
- Cui Shanggui (嬪商珪), Imperial Concubine (嬪 博陵崔氏; d. 636), married Emperor Gaozu of Tang and had a son (Li Yuanyu, Prince Dengkang )
- Noble Consort, of the Cui clan of Boling (貴妃 博陵崔氏; d. 757) of Emperor Dezong of Tang, mother of Li Miao, Li Su and Princess Qizhaoyi
