= Choi Seung-yong =

Choi Seung-yong may also refer to:

- Choi Seung-yong (speed skater) (born 1980), South Korean speed skater
- Choi Seung-yong (baseball) (born 2001), South Korean baseball player
