= Tsoi =

Tsoi or TSOI may refer to:

- Geto Heaven Remix T.S.O.I. (The Sound of Illadelph), an album by American hip-hop artist Common
- Viktor Tsoi, Russian singer
- Anita Tsoy, Russian singer-songwriter

It may also be an alternative spelling of two different surnames:

- Cai (surname), a Chinese surname, in Cantonese pronunciation
- Choi (Korean name), especially as a transcription of the Cyrillic 'Цой'

== See also ==
- Tsoy (disambiguation)
