= Seung-yong =

- Hangul: 승용
- RR: Seungyong
- MR: Sŭngyong

Seung-yong is a Korean given name.

== People ==
People with this name include:

- Nam Sung-yong (1912–2001), Korean male marathon runner of the Japanese colonial period
- Seung-Yong Seong (born 1964/1965), South Korean immunologist and microbiologist
- Lee Seung-yong (born 1970), South Korean male fencer
- Choi Seung-yong (baseball) (born 2001), South Korean baseball player
- Choi Seung-yong (speed skater) (born 1980), South Korean female speed skater
- Kim Seung-yong (born 1985), South Korean male footballer
- Jung Seung-yong (born 1991), South Korean male footballer

== See also ==
- List of Korean given names
