= Gyeongju Choi clan =

Korean clan from North Gyeongsang Province

- Country: Korea
- Founder: Ch'oe Ch'i-wŏn
- Connected members: Ch'oe Ŏn-wi

The Gyeongju Choi clan (Korean: 경주 최씨; Hanja: 慶州 崔氏) is a Korean clan, with a bon-gwan located in Gyeongju, North Gyeongsang Province. According to a census from 2015, the population of the Gyeongju Choi clan is 945,005 in South Korea. The apical ancestor of the Gyeongju Choi clan is Ch'oe Ch'i-wŏn, a Confucian scholar and official during the Unified Silla period.

== See also ==
- Choi (Korean surname)
