= Shen Junliang =

Shen Junliang (沈君諒) was briefly a chancellor of the Chinese Tang dynasty, during the first reign of Emperor Ruizong.

Little is known about Shen Junliang's career before or after his brief stint as chancellor, as, atypical for a chancellor, he did not have a biography in either the Old Book of Tang or the New Book of Tang. As of 684, he was serving as imperial chronicler (右史, You Shi) when Emperor Ruizong's powerful mother and regent Empress Dowager Wu (later known as Wu Zetian) promoted him to be Zhengjian Daifu (正諫大夫), a senior advisor at the examination bureau of government (鸞臺, Luantai) and made him a chancellor de facto, with the designation Tong Fengge Luantai Pingzhangshi (同鳳閣鸞臺平章事), along with Cui Cha. In spring 685, both he and Cui were removed from those posts. There was no further record about Shen in official histories, and there appears to be no historical record of his death.

== Notes and references ==
- Zizhi Tongjian, vol. 203.
