= Tsoy =

Tsoy may refer to one of the following.

- An alternative spelling of two different surnames:
  - Cai (surname), a Chinese surname, in Cantonese pronunciation
  - Choe (Korean name), especially as a transcription of the Cyrillic Цой
- The Shadow of Yesterday, a role-playing game often abbreviated TSoY

== See also ==
- Tsoi (disambiguation)
