= Choe Jun =

Korean businessman (1884–1970)

- Hangul: 최준
- Hanja: 崔浚
- RR: Choe Jun
- MR: Ch'oe Chun

Choe Jun (Korean: 최준; 1884–1970) was a businessman and philanthropist in early 20th-century Korea. He was born in Gyeongju, in present-day South Korea. His family, known as the "Choe Bujatjip," had been known since the 17th century for their wealth and public-spiritedness. After the liberation of Korea in 1945, he gave much of his fortune to the Yeungnam University Foundation. He spent his later years in Suji, Yongin (Gyeonggi province).
