= Andrey Pak =

Korean Uzbekistani geologist (1926–1994)

Andrey Insunovich Pak (Russian: Андрей Инсунович Пак; November 1926 – 1994) was a Soviet geologist and Doctor of Geological and Mineralogical Sciences.

He was of Korean descent. In 1951 he graduated from Samarkand State University. He worked as chief geologist, chief parties in Krasnokholmskaya exploratory expedition.

Member of the discovery and exploration of gold, silver, uranium, phosphate, turquoise, quartz sand, and others. From 1967 to 1994 - Senior and Senior Fellow, Institute of Geology and Geophysics, Academy of Sciences of Uzbekistan. Candidate (1965) and Doctor (1984) of Geological and Mineralogical Sciences.

In 1959, he received the Lenin Prize for the discovery of uranium deposits in Uchquduq. He was also awarded the Order of the Red Banner of Labour and "Pioneer of the field" medal.

Author of the book: The Evolution of weathering crusts in the history of the Earth.

== Sources ==
- Photo http://koryo-saram.ru/geolog-uchenyj-laureat/
- B. Lee. Coast of Hope. Tashkent Publisher: Niso Poligraf Year of publication: 201 Edition: 500 copies.
