= Shuguang Cui =

- 崔曙光
- Education: Stanford University; McMaster University; Beijing University of Posts and Telecommunications
- Scientific career
- Fields: Signal processing and communications
- Workplaces: Shenzhen Research Institute of Big Data; The Chinese University of Hong Kong, Shenzhen; University of California, Davis
- Thesis: Cross-Layer Optimization in Energy Constrained Networks
- Doctoral advisor: Andrea Goldsmith (engineer)
- Website: https://sse.cuhk.edu.cn/en/faculty/cuishuguang

Shuguang "Robert" Cui is a vice director at Shenzhen Research Institute of Big Data, and the X.Q. Deng Presidential Chair Professor for the School of Science and Engineering at The Chinese University of Hong Kong, Shenzhen, and an adjunct professor at the University of California, Davis.

== Education and career ==
Cui graduated from the Beijing University of Posts and Telecommunications in 1997 with a bachelor's degree in radio engineering (ranked 1st), and the McMaster University in 2000 with a M.Eng in electrical engineering, and then got his Ph.D. in electrical engineering from Stanford University in 2005. Following graduation, he worked as an assistant, associate, full, and Chair Professor at University of Arizona, Texas A&M University, and UC Davis. Cui was also a visiting processor at the ShanghaiTech University in 2013 to 2014. Cui served as an editor for IEEE Signal Processing Magazine as well as associate editor for the IEEE Transactions on Big Data, the IEEE Transactions on Signal Processing, the IEEE JSAC Series on Green Communications and Networking, and the IEEE Transactions on Wireless Communications. From 2009 to 2014, Cui served as elected member of the IEEE Signal Processing Society SPCOM Technical Committee and three years later, until 2018, served as an elected Chair for IEEE ComSoc Wireless Technical Committee. He currently serves as a member of the IEEE ComSoc Emerging Technology Committee as well as the Steering Committee for both IEEE Transactions on Big Data and IEEE Transactions on Cognitive Communications and Networking.

He was named a Fellow of the IEEE Information Theory Society and in 2014 became a Fellow of the Institute of Electrical and Electronics Engineers (IEEE) for his contributions to cognitive communications and energy efficient system design.

== Awards ==
- 2016: Child Family Endowed Professorship
- 2016: Elected to the list of Highly Cited Researchers by Thomson Reuters
- 2018: Amazon AWS Machine Learning Award

== Books ==
- 2012: Network Robustness Under Large-Scale Attacks Qing Zhou, Shuguang Cui, Qing Zhou, Ruifang Liu, Long Gao
- 2018: Mobile Big Data, Luoyang Fang, Luiqing Yang, Chen-Xiang Wang, Shuguang Cui
