= Jay Pil Choi =

South Korean economist

- 최재필
- Education: Seoul National University (BA); Harvard University (PhD)
- Occupation: Economist
- Employer: Michigan State University
- Known for: Research on antitrust, network effects, and intellectual property

Jay Pil Choi (Korean: 최재필) is a South Korean-American economist and University Distinguished Professor of Economics at Michigan State University. His research focuses on industrial organization, particularly antitrust economics, intellectual property rights, network effects, and platform markets.

== Education and early career ==
Choi earned his bachelor's degree in economics from Seoul National University in 1982 and his PhD in economics from Harvard University in 1990. He joined the faculty of Columbia University as an assistant professor in 1990 and was promoted to associate professor in 1996.

After a year at Seoul National University (1999–2000), Choi moved to Michigan State University in 2000, where he was appointed University Distinguished Professor in 2011. He concurrently held the position of Scientia Professor at the University of New South Wales from 2011 to 2014.

== Research ==
Choi's research addresses theoretical and policy issues in industrial organization, with particular emphasis on the economics of tying arrangements, patent pools, and network effects in technology markets. His work on tying in two-sided markets has been influential in antitrust analysis of digital platforms.

He has published extensively in leading economics journals including the American Economic Review, RAND Journal of Economics, Economic Journal, Journal of Industrial Economics, and International Economic Review. He edited Recent Developments in Antitrust: Theory and Evidence (MIT Press, 2007), which examines conceptual and empirical issues in antitrust policy.

== Professional service ==
Choi has previously served as president of the Korea-America Economic Association. He was co-editor of the International Journal of Industrial Organization from 2005 to 2013 and serves on the editorial board of Information Economics and Policy. Additionally, he is a research fellow of CESifo.

== Awards ==
Choi received the Maekyung-KAEA Economist Award in 2011, the highest award given by the Korea-America Economic Association for outstanding scholarly accomplishment. He also received the Dasan Economist Award and Cho Rakkyo Prize in 2014, the Tae-Sung Kim Memorial Prize from the Korean Econometric Society in 1999, and the Social Science Research Council Abe Fellowship in 1996–1997.
