= CHOY-TV =

Television station in Saint-Jérôme (1970s–1980s)

Saint-Jérôme, Quebec; Canada
- Channels: Analog: 4 (VHF)

Programming
- Affiliations: Community Independent

Ownership
- Owner: Télévision Communautaire de Saint-Jérôme Inc.

History
- First air date: mid-1970s
- Last air date: late 1980s

Technical information
- ERP: 47 W
- HAAT: 20 metres; 65'
- Transmitter coordinates: 45°46′41″N 74°0′11″W

CHOY-TV was a low power community television station in Saint-Jérôme, Quebec, Canada that broadcast from the mid-1970s until the late 1980s. The station was managed and operated by volunteers, and received equipment and technical support from Vidéotron. Programming included coverage of local and special events, educational, recreational and public affairs programs, news and sportscasts, and simulcasts of Télé-Université. It suffered many financial problems despite funding from donations and government grants, having to sign off temporarily in the summer of 1984. By the end of the 1980s, it was off the air permanently.
