= Shin Kwangho =

South Korean painter (born 1983)

Shin Kwang-ho
- Born: 1983 (age 42–43); Seoul, South Korea
- Education: Keimyung University
- Known for: Painting
- Movement: Abstract expressionism

- Shin Kwangho
- Hangul: 신광호
- Hanja: 申廣浩
- RR: Sin Gwangho
- MR: Sin Kwangho

Shin Kwangho (Korean: 신광호) is a South Korean painter currently based in Seoul. He studied art at Keimyung University. He paints distorted portraits, which he creates using oil, acrylic, and charcoal.

Shin's paintings depict subjects using colors that represent the subjects' emotions, with brushstrokes and layers of paint often distorting the subjects' faces while drawing attention to the eyes.
