= Cui Wei =

Cui Wei may refer to:

- Cui Wei (actor) (Chinese: 崔嵬), Chinese actor and film director
- Cui Wei (footballer, born 1983) (Chinese: 崔威), Chinese footballer from Beijing, who plays for Beijing Institute of Technology F.C.
- Cui Wei (footballer, born 1994) (Chinese: 崔巍), Chinese footballer from Shandong, who plays for Shandong Luneng Taishan F.C.
