= Ubong =

Ubong is a given name. Notable people with the name include:

- Ubong Ekpai (born 1995), Nigerian footballer
- Ubong Essien (born 2001), Nigerian footballer
- Ubong Friday (born 1998), Nigerian footballer
- Ubong King (1972–2020), Nigerian businessperson
- Ubong Williams, Nigerian footballer
