= Takashi Okamura (photographer) =

Japanese photographer (1927–2014)

Takashi Okamura (岡村崔, Okamura Takashi; 13 December 1927 – 4 February 2014) was a Japanese photographer who specialised in the photography of art.

Okamura was born on 13 December 1927 in Kichijōji, Tokyo. He studied architecture at Nihon University from 1948. Okamura was a keen and proficient skier (skiing as a representative of Japan in Chamonix in 1959), and a photographer of skiing. In 1960 he became a professional photographer, also writing about photography and skiing.

Okamura moved to Rome in 1965 and since that time has specialised in photographing buildings, frescos, and works of art, frequently contributing the photographs to lavishly produced books.

Okamura died from lung cancer on 4 February 2014, at the age of 86.

== Books by Okamura ==
- (in Japanese) Asama Kōgen: Karuizawa, Takamie, Shikazawa, Kōzu, Arafune, Myōgisan (浅間高原: 軽井沢・高峰・鹿沢・神津・荒船・妙義山). Blue Guidebooks. Tokyo: Jitsugyō-no-Nihon-sha, 1961.
- (in Japanese) Sukī no te hodoki (スキーの手ほどき). Fujisawa: Ikeda Shoten, 1961.
- (in Japanese) Sukī o hajimeru hito no tame ni (スキーを始める人のために, For the beginner at skiing). Fujisawa: Ikeda Shoten, 1962.
- (in Japanese) Kamera o hajimeru hito no tame ni (カメラを始める人のために, For the beginner with a camera). Fujisawa: Ikeda Shoten, 1962. Cowritten with Fumio Iijima.
- (in Japanese) Kamera shiki no torikata (カメラ四季の撮り方, Using a camera in the four seasons). Fujisawa: Ikeda Shoten, 1963.
- (in Japanese) Karuizawa to Asamayama (軽井沢と浅間山, Karuizawa and Asamayama). Blue Guidebooks. Tokyo: Jitsugyō-no-Nihon-sha, 1967. Cowritten with Masao Izumi.
- (in Japanese) Rōma no funsui (ローマの噴水, The fountains of Rome). Tokyo: Kajima Shuppankai, 1975. Edited by Ume Kajima.
- (in Japanese) Jutai kokuchi (受胎告知, The annunciation). Tokyo: Kajima Shuppankai, 1977. OCLC 703870545. Edited by Shūji Takashina.
- (in Japanese) Mikeranjero no Vatikan hekiga: Okamura Takashi Shashinten (ミケランジェロのヴァティカン壁画：岡村崔写真展) / The Vatican Frescoes of Michelangelo. Catalogue of an exhibition held August–September 1980 in the Seibu gallery, Ikebukuro. Despite the English alternative title, all in Japanese.
- The Vatican Frescoes of Michelangelo. 2 vols. Abbeville, 1980. ISBN 0-89659-158-1. Edition of 400. Text by André Chastel.
  - (in Japanese) Mikeranjero Vatikan hekiga (ミケランジェロ・ヴァティカン壁画). (Italian title Gli affreschi di Michelangelo nel Vaticano.) 2 vols. Tokyo: Kōdansha, 1980. Edition of 200.
- (in Japanese) Mikeranjero Vatikan kyūden hekiga (ミケランジェロヴァティカン宮殿壁画). Tokyo: Kōdansha, 1981. Text by Yasuo Kamon.
- (in Italian) Delfi. Il santuario della Grecia. Mondadori, 1981.
  - (in French) Delphes: le sanctuaire d'Apollon. Robert Laffont, 1985. ISBN 2-221-50406-2.
  - (in German) Delphi: Das Heiligtum der Griechen. Freiburg: Herder, 1982. ISBN 3-451-19767-7.
- (in German) Assisi. Die mystische Welt des heiligen Franziskus. Herder, 1982. ISBN 3-451-19775-8. Text by Gerhard Ruf.
- (in German) Rom die Stadt der Päpste. Die Welt der Religionen, 11. Freiburg im Breisgau: Herder. 1983. ISBN 3-451-19771-5. Text by Francesco Paolo Rizzo.
- (in French) Les hauts lieux de la spiritualité. Robert Laffont, 1985. Text by Francesco Paolo Rizzo.
- (in Japanese) Etoruria no hekiga (エトルリアの壁画, Etruscan frescoes). Tokyo: Iwanami Shoten, 1985. ISBN 4-00-008123-3. Text by M.パロッティ-ノ et al.
- (in Japanese) Mikeranjero Vatikan hekiga (ミケランジェロ・ヴァティカン壁画) / Michelangelo's Frescoes in the Vatican. 2 vols. Tokyo: Kōdansha, 1985–6. Vol. 1, ISBN 4-06-202412-8; vol. 2, ISBN 4-06-202413-6. Text (in Japanese only) by Yoshiyuki Morita. Captions in both Japanese and English.
- Cellini. Abbeville, 1985. ISBN 0-89659-453-X. Text by John Pope-Hennessy; principal photography by David Finn, additional photography by Okamura.
- The Art of Florence. 2 vols. New York: Abbeville, 1988. ISBN 0-89659-402-5. 2 vols. Artabras, 1994. ISBN 0-7909-7966-7. 1 vol (?). Artabras, 1999. ISBN 0-89660-111-0. Text by Glenn M. Andres, John M. Hunisak, and A. Richard Turner. Also in a French edition (L'art de Florence).
  - (in Japanese) Firentse no bijutsu (フィレンツェの美術). 2 vols. Tokyo: NHK, 1991. ISBN 978-4-14-009165-4.
- (in Italian) Pittura etrusca al Museo di Villa Giulia. Studi di archeologia, 6. Rome: De Luca, 1989. ISBN 88-7813-219-5. ISBN 88-7813-226-8. Text by Maria Antonietta Rizzo.
- (in Italian) La Cappella Sistina. 3 vols. Milano : Rizzoli, 1989–. ISBN 88-17-25802-4. 44 cm tall. Introduction by Frederick Hartt, commentary by Gianluigi Colalucci. 1. La preistoria della Bibbia 1989. 2. Antenati di Cristo. 1989. ISBN 88-17-25802-4. 3. Storia della creazione. 1990. ISBN 88-17-25805-9.
- La Cappella Sistina. Vol. 4, Il guidizio universale. Text by Pierluigi De Vecchi, Gianluigi Colalucci. Translation of New light on Michelangelo in the Sistine Chapel. Milano: Rizzoli, c1995. ISBN 88-17-25808-3
  - (in Japanese) Mikeranjero Shisutīna reihaidō: Saigo no shinban (ミケランジェロ・システィーナ礼拝堂：最後の審判) / Michelangelo/la Cappella Sistina. Tokyo: Nippon Television Network Corp, 1996. ISBN 4-8203-9611-0.
- The Sistine Chapel. 2 vols. New York: Knopf, 1991. ISBN 0-394-58783-9. Barrie and Jenkins, 1991. ISBN 0-7126-5101-2. 44 cm. Text by Frederick Hartt, Fabrizio Mancinelli and Gianluigi Colalucci. Translation of La Cappella Sistina.
  - (in Japanese) Mikeranjero Shisutīna reihaidō (ミケランジェロ・システイーナ礼拝堂). 日本テレビ放送網, 1990–1.
    - Vol. 1, ISBN 978-4-8203-9010-7
    - Vol. 2 Kyũyaku no sekai 2, Tenchi sōzō (旧約の世界 2 天地創造). ISBN 978-4-8203-9105-0
    - Vol. 3, ISBN 978-4-8203-9100-5.
- (in Japanese) Dai-Vachikan-ten katarogu (大ヴァチカン展カタログ). Tokyo: Sogō, 1993.
- Treasures of the Uffizi, Florence. Abbeville, 1996. ISBN 0-7892-0234-4. Co-photographed with Paolo Tosi, edited by Abigail Asher.
- (in Japanese) Shisutīna reihaidō: Yomigaeru Mikeranjero (システィーナ礼拝堂：甦るミケランジェロ) / La Cappella Sistina. Nippon Television Network Corp, 1998. ISBN 4-8203-9674-9.
- (in Japanese) Rōma Santa Sabīna kyōkai mokuchōhi no kenkyū (ローマサンタ・サビーナ教会木彫扉の研究). Tokyo: Chūō Kōron Bijutsu Shuppan, 2003. ISBN 4-8055-0446-3. Text by Sahoko Tsuji (辻佐保子).
- Michelangelo the Last Judgment: A Glorious Restoration. Abrams, 1997. ISBN 0-8109-1549-9. Abradale, 2000. ISBN 0-8109-8190-4. Text by Loren W. Partridge et al.
- (in German) Die Sixtinische Kapelle: Das jüngste Gericht. Benziger, 2002. ISBN 3-545-33151-2. Text by Sandro Chierici.
- Michelangelo: The Frescoes of the Sistine Chapel. New York: Abrams, 2002. ISBN 0-8109-3530-9. Text by Marcia B. Hall.
  - (in French) Michel-Ange et les Fresques de la Chapelle Sixtine. La Renaissance du livre, 2002. ISBN 2-8046-0674-0.

== Sources ==
- (in Japanese) Mikeranjero no Vatikan hekiga: Okamura Takashi Shashinten (ミケランジェロのヴァティカン壁画：岡村崔写真展) / The Vatican Frescoes of Michelangelo. Short biography on non-numbered page.
