= Kristy Choi =

American film director

Kristy Choi is a Korean American filmmaker and writer. She directed and wrote Herselves, a 9-minute-long coming-of-age documentary which was first shown at the Los Angeles Asian Pacific Film Festival in October 2020. The film is experimental and explores the life of Choi's mother, who immigrated to Los Angeles in the mid-1980s. Choi was a 2019 Southern Exposure Film Fellow, a 2019 North Start Fellow at Points North Institute, and a Directing Fellow at Visual Communications in 2020. Her film Conviction was a 2020 Official Selection for the Wild & Scenic Film Festival.
