= Ganghwa =

Ganghwa may refer to:

- Ganghwa County, administrative region of South Korea
- Ganghwa Island, island in South Korea
- Battle of Ganghwa
- The Japanese Battle of Ganghwa
- Treaty of Ganghwa

== See also ==
- Gochang, Hwasun and Ganghwa Dolmen Sites, South Korea
