= Yevgeny Kim =

Soviet intelligence officer (1932–1998)

Yevgeny Ivanovich Kim
- Евгений Иванович Ким
- Born: 27 February 1932; Geochang County, Keishōnan-dō, Korea, Empire of Japan (now South Gyeongsang Province, South Korea)
- Died: 12 November 1998 (aged 66); Moscow, Russia
- Military career
- Allegiance: Soviet Union; Russia
- Branch: KGB; Foreign Intelligence Service
- Rank: Colonel
- Awards: Hero of the Soviet Union

Yevgeny Ivanovich Kim (Russian: Евгений Иванович Ким, born Kim Yen Cher, 27 February 1932 – 12 November 1998) was a Korean-born Soviet intelligence officer who worked as an illegal for the First Chief Directorate of the KGB in an Asian country from 1966 to 1989. He set up and ran an autonomous illegal residency there and was secretly made a Hero of the Soviet Union in 1987. The country where he worked remains classified. The Foreign Intelligence Service (SVR) made his name public in January 2020, ahead of its centenary.

== Early life ==
Kim was born Kim Yen Cher (Russian: Ким Ен Чер) on 27 February 1932 in Geochang County in Japanese-ruled Korea, into a Korean peasant family. He was the seventh and youngest child of a large family of six sons and a daughter. His father died early, and his mother raised the children.

In 1942, the family moved to South Sakhalin, where Kim lived in the settlement of Toro, renamed Shakhtyorsk in 1947 following the Soviet invasion of South Sakhalin in 1945. After finishing seven grades of school, he worked as a technician and studied on his own in the evenings, and his efforts earned him a return to school directly into the ninth grade. In 1953, while still a schoolboy, he took Soviet citizenship and joined the Komsomol. He was sent to the Central Komsomol School in Moscow, but he disliked the capital and instead entered the Faculty of Oriental Languages at Leningrad State University, where 22 applicants competed for each place. He also worked as a translator at the Institute of Zoology and enrolled in the correspondence course of the university's biology faculty, studying at both faculties at the same time. He graduated with honors in 1960, specializing in Japanese philology, and was offered a place in graduate school. He spoke Japanese, Korean, English and Spanish.

== Intelligence career ==
=== Recruitment and training ===
In 1960, Kim was enrolled in the special reserve of the KGB's First Chief Directorate, the service's foreign intelligence arm, and in 1962, he began operational intelligence work. According to Nikolai Dolgopolov, a writer and historian of the Soviet security services, he trained one-on-one with an instructor for three years, often for 12 to 14 hours a day. The training covered cover professions, area studies, operational psychology, radio communications, ciphers, dead drops and the detection of surveillance. He also took up sambo, skiing and swimming. To perfect his Spanish, he spent two years in a country where it was the main language.

=== Assignment abroad ===
In 1966, a Soviet merchant ship landed Kim at a port in an Asian country that the SVR described as having a complex operational situation. Dolgopolov wrote that the first thing Kim saw after landing was endless boulders, under one of which he found peasant clothing that someone had hidden for him. For the next fifteen years, he had to build his new life entirely alone. His cover story was meant to bring him home within three or four years, but the assignment was extended to ten years, and he remained abroad until 1989.

According to the SVR, Kim set up and ran an autonomous illegal residency, kept in contact with sources of valuable documentary information, and obtained intelligence on priority issues that was "implemented at the highest level". Colonel Korolev, quoted by Argumenty Nedeli, explained that this was the top rating for intelligence work, given when the documents obtained reached the country's highest leadership. Dolgopolov wrote that Kim overcame intense competition to obtain a high post in the country, which allowed him to pass on valuable information of a strategic character. In 1978, Kim formally took the name Yevgeny Ivanovich Kim in his Soviet documents.

His wife was trained to join him abroad, but she dropped out of the training because of difficulties with languages. Dolgopolov argued that sending her, with her typically Slavic appearance, would have been tantamount to collective suicide. On one occasion, Kim ran into his former chief, Alexander Shelepin, who rushed to embrace him, but his cover was not blown. He stayed at his post even after the betrayal of the double agent Oleg Gordievsky had raised the possibility of danger. He was often seriously ill, and his eyesight deteriorated. His assignment ended after headquarters warned him that he was in danger.

In 1987, while still abroad, Kim was made a Hero of the Soviet Union for the results of his work and the courage and heroism he had shown. BBC News Russian reported that the award was conferred by a secret decree.

=== Later career ===
After his return, Kim worked for some time in the KGB's central apparatus. He found the changes in the country difficult to accept and felt the dissolution of the Soviet Union as a personal loss. He helped to train young intelligence officers, advising them that "one must endlessly love both one's homeland and the country where one is stationed". He later retired with the rank of colonel.

== Personal life ==
Kim was married in the 1960s and had a son, and he saw his family, who remained in Moscow, only a few times during his years abroad. His teenage son drowned while swimming at a pioneer camp. Kim was able to come to Moscow for only a day for the funeral and returned to his post immediately afterwards. His wife then divorced him. Abroad, he met a local woman, whom he recruited and married, and she worked with him as a radio operator and cipher clerk. He was unable to attend his mother's funeral because he was on assignment.

== Death ==
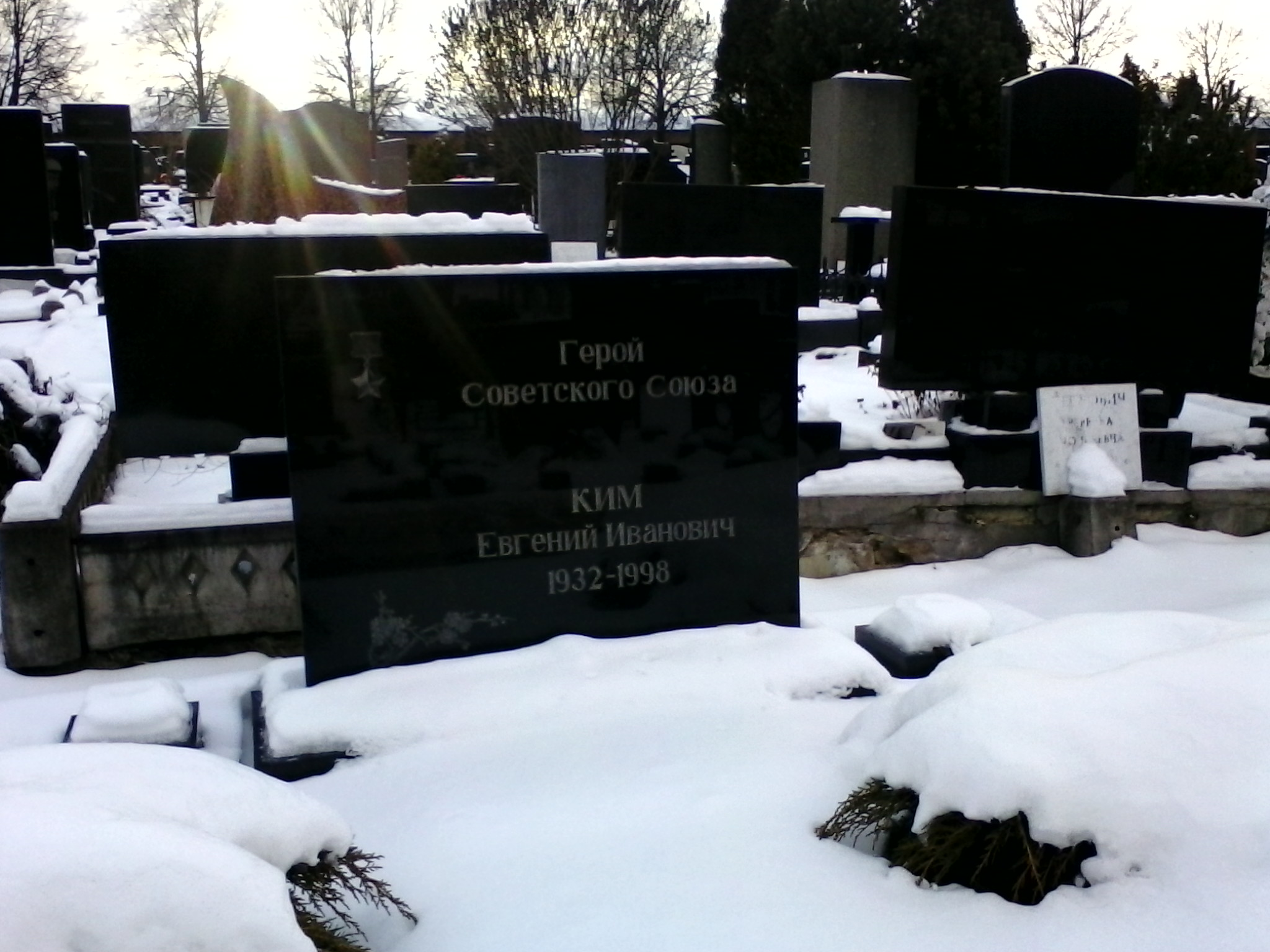
Kim's grave at the Troyekurovskoye Cemetery

On 12 November 1998, Kim was hit by a car while crossing a street a few steps from his home in Moscow. By then, his eyesight was very poor. According to BBC News Russian, the state organized his funeral because he had no close relatives, and members of the Korean community recalled that only nine Koreans attended, alongside many SVR officers. He was buried with military honors at Troyekurovskoye Cemetery in Moscow. For years, his gravestone bore only his title and name.

== Declassification ==
In 2017, Dolgopolov described the career of an unnamed illegal in Argumenty i Fakty, and BBC News Russian later noted that the details largely matched Kim's biography. On 28 January 2020, SVR director Sergey Naryshkin named Kim among seven illegals at a press conference at the Rossiya Segodnya news agency, ahead of the service's centenary. RIA Novosti reported that it was the first time the SVR had declassified several outstanding illegals at once. The released biography did not name the country where he had worked. Argumenty i Fakty noted that Soviet Koreans had been used as illegals in Maoist China in the 1960s and 1970s, but stressed that this was only an assumption in Kim's case. Diletant also suggested China, while noting that there was no confirmation. Colonel Korolev told Argumenty Nedeli that the country remained a military secret.

== Awards and honors ==
Hero of the Soviet Union (1987)
Order "For Merit to the Fatherland", 4th class
Order of Lenin
Order of the Red Banner
Order of the Red Star
Medal "For Courage"

- Badge "Honorary State Security Officer"
- Badge "For Service in Intelligence"

On 9 September 2023, a bust of Kim by the sculptor Mikhail Baskakov was unveiled in the Ariran square at the Korean Cultural Center in Yuzhno-Sakhalinsk. The monument was erected on the initiative of the Russian Military Historical Society. Presidential aide Vladimir Medinsky attended the ceremony, and Kim's nephew Kim Gen Su unveiled the bust.
