= Gennady Kim =

- Born: Gennady Sergeyevitch Kim; September 17, 1946 (age 79); Tashkent Province, Uzbek SSR
- Genres: Classical music, Jazz, Popular music
- Occupations: Guitarist, singer-songwriter, composer, conductor,
- Instruments: Classical guitar, acoustic-electric guitar
- Years active: 1967–present
- Website: www.agga.kz
- Awards: Honored worker of the guitar education in Kazakhstan, Grand Order of Mugunghwa

Gennady Kim (Russian: Геннадий Ким; born September 17, 1946), is a guitarist, composer, conductor, and music teacher in Kazakhstan.

== Biography ==
He was born in Kolkhoz "Politodel" in the Tashkent Province of the Uzbek Soviet Socialist Republic in a family of ethnic Koreans. Second was Tashkent National Institute of Culture in 1985, as orchestra conductor and classical guitarist. On a professional scene he is from 1967 in Uzbekistan National Estrada with People's Artist of the USSR – Bakir Zakirov and in a gypsy ensemble.

From 1969 to 1970 he worked as a solo guitarist in the Korean ensemble "Gayageum". From 1970 to 1972 – solo guitarist in the jazz ensemble "Turkistan asterisk". From 1973 – solo guitarist in a vocal-instrumental ensemble "Synthesis" with soloist Natasha Nurmuhamedova. From 1976 to 1981 was a guitarist and music director in "Chin-chun" ensemble, which won a Lenin Komsomol Prize in USSR in 1980. From 1981 at the invitation of the Almaty Korean Theater in Kazakhstan, he worked in "Arirang" ensemble as solo guitarist and like 2nd conductor. His concerts were broadcast on the 1st Channel of Kazakh TV from 1989 till 1993. Participant of many various international festivals both like classical guitarist and jazz music. Gennady Kim is the guitarist of the highest category. His name as a classical guitarist, became in the Russian encyclopedia "Classical Guitar in Russia and in the USSR," (published in "Yekaterinburg-1991).

From 1996 to 1999 was a director in State Republic Korean theater in Almaty. In 2000 created Guitar Association of Almaty and the creative association "Assalamalleykum – Annyoung" and in 2001 opened the first class of the classical guitar in Almaty at the National Academy of Arts, named by T.Zhurgenov, where he worked till 2008.

At the beginning of 2000 with his wife Gong Cha, Mun gave a serial concerts in Germany, France and the Netherlands for Korean diaspora in Europe. In 2001 he was awarded the Order of Civil Merit of the Republic of Korea by the late of the president Kim Dae-jung for the issue of the literary and musical composition "Legends and profits of the Soviet Koreans (in the songs)". In 2006 and 2007 – twicely awarded the Diploma of the mayor of Almaty. In November 2008 he became the 2008 winner of the 5th composer competition of Kazakhstan patriotic song "My Homeland" for the song "Astana"(for the text and music). He wrote études, preludes, variations and transcriptions on the Russian, Korean, Kazakh, Uzbek and other melodies for guitar solo. In 2007 published compilation of his own songs, in which included more than 50 songs. His students are winners of Republic and International guitar competitions in Spain, Italy, Russia, Kazakhstan and Uzbekistan. From 2008 teaching in the classical guitar department in music college, named by P.I.Tchaikovsky. He is a member of juror and chairman of many Republic competitions. In 2012 his variations on the Korean songs recorded for the CD, which published in Korea Republic. In 2013 awarded the medal "Honored worker of the guitar education.
