= Cui Yingjie =

Chinese migrant worker and murderer

Cui Yingjie (Chinese: 崔英杰; pinyin: Cuī Yīngjié; born July 15, 1983) is a peasant from Hebei province of China who resided in Beijing as a migrant worker. Cui became the source of national attention in 2006 when he confronted and stabbed an urban law enforcement official to death for trying to confiscate his tricycle cart, which he used to sell sausages to make a living. Cui was convicted of intentional homicide and sentenced to death with a two-year reprieve, later commuted to life in prison.

== Stabbing ==
Cui Yingjie was born in 1983 in a village in Fuping County, Hebei, 275 kilometers southwest of Beijing. Cui received a middle school education, then joined the military, before going to Beijing to work as a labourer for an entertainment and restaurant company.

On August 11, 2006, Cui was on the streets of Beijing with his tricycle cart selling barbecued sausages. According to Cui's account, he had then only recently purchased the tricycle cart with borrowed money. The official, 36-year-old Li Zhiqiang (李志强), worked for the Beijing City Urban Administrative and Law Enforcement Bureau. The bureau where Li worked was better known in Chinese by the abbreviation Chengguan (城管). The official attempted to confiscate Cui's cart because Cui had no license to operate a business in Beijing. The official then ordered for the tricycle cart to be loaded onto a vehicle and taken away. Cui protested the confiscation of the cart and a struggle ensued, during which Cui stabbed Li in the throat with a fruit knife. Li died from his wounds soon after. Cui then fled to Tianjin, where he was arrested several days later.

== Trial ==
Cui's trial began in December 2006. During the trial, a large online discussion began on whether Cui should face the death penalty or not for his crimes. Although precedent called for the death penalty, many Chinese sympathized with Cui's situation as a poor peasant coming to Beijing to earn a living for his family, who lost his temper when his means of earning a living was being taken away from him. In April 2007, Cui was convicted of intentional homicide and sentenced to death, but his punishment was reprieved for 2 years. This reprieve generally implies that with good behavior Cui's sentence will be reduced to life in prison.

During the trial, Cui's lawyers argued that Cui did not meet the threshold for committing "intentional homicide". They cited that Cui did not know the victim and had no prior dealings with him, and the defendant did not realize in advance the harm his actions would cause, and that he acted out of duress rather than through careful planning.

Li Zhiqiang was a highly regarded officer in the Chengguan force, and he was later named a "revolutionary hero" by the Beijing municipal government. The prosecution argued that leniency in the case would set a dangerous precedent and endanger officers carrying out their routine duties according to the law.

Cui's case highlighted the growing problem facing Beijing and other large cities. Many migrant workers had illegally come to the cities in search of work. With the 2008 Olympics approaching, Beijing has begun cracking down on migrant workers.

Many Chinese observers compared the case to that of Sun Zhigang, who was killed after being wrongly arrested in Guangzhou in 2003. That case caused a complete overhaul of the custody and repatriation laws, although it is not yet clear if Cui Yingjie's case had a similar effect on city administration.
