= Cui Cha =

Chinese chancellor (?–689)

Cui Cha (Chinese: 崔詧; died 689) was briefly a chancellor of the Chinese Tang dynasty, during the first reign of Emperor Ruizong.

Little is known about Cui Cha's career before his brief stint as chancellor, as, atypical for a chancellor, he did not have a biography in either the Old Book of Tang or the New Book of Tang. It is, however, known that his family was from Lantian (藍田, in modern-day Xi'an, Shaanxi). As of 684, he was serving as an assistant censor (監察御史, Jiancha Yushi), when, in the midst of a rebellion by Li Jingye the Duke of Ying against Emperor Ruizong's powerful mother and regent Empress Dowager Wu (later known as Wu Zetian), the chancellor Pei Yan suggested that Empress Dowager Wu could quell Li's rebellion easily by returning imperial authority to Emperor Ruizong. When Cui heard of Pei's suggestion, he submitted a note to Empress Dowager Wu stating, "Pei Yan received great responsibilities to look after the emperor after the deceased emperor [Empress Dowager Wu's husband Emperor Gaozong] entrusted him with those great responsibilities. If he were not planning to commit treason, why would he want the Empress Dowager to give up her imperial powers?" In response, Empress Dowager Wu had Pei accused of and investigated for treason, and Pei was executed. Later that year, she made Cui, who was at that point an editor of the imperial archives (著作郎, Zhuzuo Lang), Zhengjian Daifu (正諫大夫), a senior advisor at the examination bureau of government (鸞臺, Luantai) and made him a chancellor de facto, with the designation Tong Fengge Luantai Pingzhangshi (同鳳閣鸞臺平章事), along with Shen Junliang. In spring 685, both he and Shen were removed from those posts. As of 689, Cui was serving as deputy minister of defense (夏官侍郎, Xiaguan Shilang), when, for reasons lost to history, Empress Dowager Wu had him assassinated.

== Notes and references ==
- Zizhi Tongjian, vols. 203, 204.
