= Sergey Tsoy =

Russian politician and journalist (born 1957)

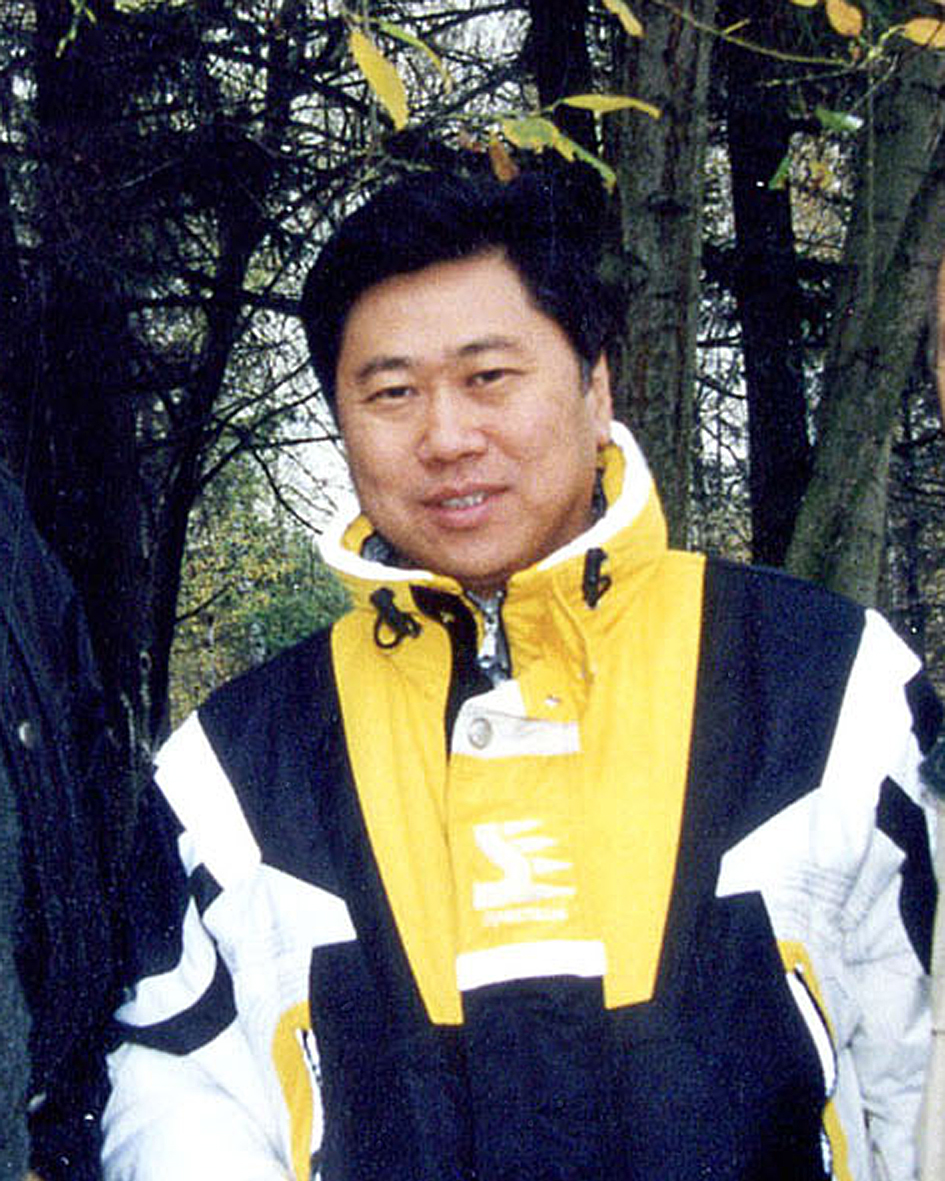

Spokesman of the Mayor of Moscow
- In office 1989–2010

Head of Press Service of the Mayor and the City Hall of Moscow
- In office 1989–2010

Chairman of Board of Directors of the "TV Centre" Channel
- In office 2006–2011

Deputy Chairman of RusHydro
- In office 2010–2016

Personal details
- Born: Sergey Petrovich Tsoy; 23 March 1957 (age 69) Karabulak, Checheno-Ingush Autonomous Soviet Socialist Republic, Russian SFSR, Soviet Union
- Spouse: Anita Tsoy
- Children: 1
- Education: Moscow State University

Sergey Petrovich Tsoy (Russian: Сергей Петрович Цой; born 1957) is a Russian executive. He previously held roles in the Moscow City Hall and "RusHydro".

== Biography ==
Sergey Tsoy was born in the Karablak city, the USSR, in 1957. After graduating from the Rostov State University, faculty of journalistics, Tsoy has worked a journalist of the Stroitelnaya newspaper.

Sergey Tsoy married Anita Tsoy in the late 1980s, a future famous Russian pop-singer of Korean descent and has a son.

== Career ==
He has been working in the executive branch of the Moscow city government since March 26, 1989.

Starting on that date, he served as head of the press service and press secretary to the Chairman of the Executive Committee of the Moscow City Council. Since 1992, he was an advisor and press secretary to Mayor Yuri Luzhkov.

Since 1997, he has been a member of the board of directors of the TV channel TV Centre (TVC), and since 2006, chairman of the board of directors of JSC "TV Centre".

In 2009, he was elected Chairman of the Board of Directors of the media group "Radio–Center", which includes three radio stations: "Govorit Moskva" ("Moscow Speaks"), "Sport-FM", and "Public Russian Radio".

Since 2004, he has held the degree of Candidate of Political Sciences. His dissertation was defended at the Faculty of Philosophy of Moscow State University on the topic: “Transformation of the Image of Moscow Authority in the Late Soviet and Post-Soviet Periods (1987–2003).”

Since 2009, he has been the head of the Department of Media Technologies at Moscow International University.

He served as editor-in-chief of the United Editorial Office of the Mayor and Government of Moscow, which publishes such journals as The Bulletin of the Mayor and Government of Moscow and Moscow Auctions.

On November 3, 2010, he resigned from his position as head of the press service of the Mayor and the Government of Moscow and as the Mayor’s press secretary.

On December 1, 2010, by decision of the board of directors of JSC RusHydro, he was appointed Deputy Chairman of the Management Board. RusHydro (Federal Hydrogenerating Company) is a Russian energy company that owns most of the country's hydroelectric power plants. It is the largest Russian generating company and the second-largest hydropower company in the world by installed capacity (after Canada’s Hydro-Québec). The company's headquarters is located in Moscow. Sergey Tsoy oversaw four departments at RusHydro: the Department for Interaction with Government Authorities, the Department for International Cooperation, the Department of Public Relations and Press Service, and the Department of Administrative Affairs.

On October 31, 2014, the RusHydro Board of Directors decided to reduce the number of board members from 14 to 5. Sergey Tsoy was appointed First Deputy General Director and State Secretary of the company, retaining all his responsibilities.

In August 2016, he joined PJSC NK Rosneft as Vice President for Material and Technical Support and advisor to the Chief Executive Officer.

Since October 2016, he has headed Rosneft’s aviation assets operator — LLC RN-Aerocraft.

On October 1, 2016, he was elected President of the All-Russian Sports Public Organization "Karate Federation of Russia".
