= Bai Baoshan =

Chinese serial killer

- 白宝山
- Bai during interrogation
- Born: 6 November 1958; Shijingshan District, Beijing, China
- Died: April 1998 (aged 39); Xinjiang Uyghur Autonomous Region, China
- Cause of death: Execution by shooting
- Convictions: Murder, robbery, assault
- Penalty: Death

Details
- Victims: 15–17
- Span of crimes: 1996 – 1997 (also confessed to two earlier murders)
- Country: China
- Locations: Beijing; Xinjiang; Hebei
- Date apprehended: 5 September 1997

Bai Baoshan (Chinese: 白宝山; pinyin: Bái Bǎoshān; 6 November 1958 – April 1998) was a Chinese serial killer convicted of murdering 15 men, including police officers, security guards, and male civilians.

== Biography ==
Bai Baoshan committed his first murder in the 1980s during a holdup. He served 13 years in prison for murder and robbery and emerged with a desire for revenge against society. In 1996, Bai attacked a police sentry in Beijing and stole a semiautomatic firearm, which he used to kill one person and injure six others. In Hebei, he killed another police officer and stole his weapon before traveling to Ürümqi where he and two accomplices murdered ten people and stole 1.5 million yuan. He then murdered one of his accomplices so that he would not have to share the loot.

Bai was returned to Beijing and was arrested on October 16, 1997. He was charged with 14 counts of homicide and multiple other related felonies. He confessed to the crime and was put on trial in the Xinjiang region because that was where he killed most of his victims. He was convicted on all counts and executed on May 6, 1998.

== See also ==
- List of serial killers in China
