= Cui Guanghao =

Chinese footballer

Cui Guanghao 崔光浩
Personal information
- Date of birth: April 22, 1979 (age 47)
- Place of birth: Huludao, Liaoning, China
- Height: 1.65 m (5 ft 5 in)
- Position: Midfielder

Youth career
- 2000–2002: Liaoning F.C.

Senior career*
Years	Team	Apps	(Gls)
2003–2010	Nanjing Yoyo	136	(6)
- * Club domestic league appearances and goals as of July 20, 2012

Cui Guanghao (Chinese: 崔光浩; Korean: 최광호; born April 22, 1979, in Huludao, Liaoning) is a Chinese football player of Korean descent who spent the majority of his career playing for Nanjing Yoyo.

== Club career ==
While Cui Guanghao initially started his career with the Liaoning F.C. youth team it was his time at second tier club Nanjing Yoyo where he distinguished himself as being a technically gifted player who was a regular for the team throughout their time within the second tier. On July 21, 2010, Cui and the entire first team of Nanjing Yoyo went on strike because of unpaid wages amounting up to 8 million Yuan, before a league game against Guangzhou Evergrande F.C. and this saw the club's youth players used as they were thrashed a Chinese record of 10-0. While Cui was one of the few players who returned to playing the majority of first team would not be able resolve their wage dispute with the club and the team ultimately went on a losing streak that saw them relegated. With the club in continued financial difficulties and still unable to pay their players they disbanded in 2011.
