= Cui Renshi =

Chinese chancellor (c. 580s–650s)

Cui Renshi 崔仁師
- Born: c. 580s Dingzhou, Hebei
- Died: c. 650s (aged 60s–70s)
- Occupation: Statesman
- Children: Cui Yi; Cui Chuai; Cui Zhuo; Cui She

Cui Renshi (c. 580s–650s) was a Chinese official of the Tang dynasty who briefly served as a chancellor late in the reign of Emperor Taizong. His grandson, Cui Shi, later served as chancellor during the reigns of the emperors Zhongzong and Ruizong.

== Background ==
Cui Renshi was born in the 580s, during the reign of Emperor Wen in the Sui dynasty. (Note: Neither Cui's birth year or death year is established in historical accounts, but he was recorded to have died early in the Yonghui era (650–655) of Emperor Gaozong of Tang's reign, which implies that he died in 650 or 651. He was also recorded to have been in his 60s when he died, thus he should have been born in the 580s. See Old Book of Tang, vol. 74 and New Book of Tang, vol. 99 .) He was from Ding Prefecture (定州, roughly modern Dingzhou, Hebei). Early in the reign of Emperor Gaozu (r. 618–626), the founder of the Tang dynasty, Cui Renshi passed an imperial examination and was made the military advisor to the prefect of Guan Prefecture (管州, part of modern Zhengzhou, Henan). In 622, the chancellor Chen Shuda recommended Cui Renshi to be capable of editing imperial histories, and he was promoted to the post of military advisor to the commander of one of the imperial armies, but also given the responsibility of assisting in editing the histories of the Liang dynasty and Northern Wei.

== During Emperor Taizong's reign ==
Early in the reign of Emperor Gaozu's son, Emperor Taizong, Cui Renshi was made an assistant to the imperial censorate. In 627, there was an alleged treasonous plot that occurred in Qing Prefecture (青州, roughly modern Qingzhou, Shandong), and Cui was sent to investigate. When he got to Qing Prefecture, there had been many people already arrested by the local authorities on suspicion that they were involved in the plot. Cui removed their restraints, gave them food, and allowed them to bathe. He eventually sentenced only the ten-odd leaders to death, while releasing all of the rest. After he returned to the capital Chang'an, Emperor Taizong sent an imperial messenger to Qing Prefecture to carry out the executions, and the assistant chief judge at the supreme court, Sun Fuqie (孫伏伽), who was friendly with him, warned him that if he released too many people, he might be accused by those sentenced to death of unfairness. Cui responded, "I have heard that an official in charge of criminal law should be kind and forgiving, and therefore, even if he were going to execute people or cut off their feet, he needed to do so with respect. How can I worry about my personal safety and not care about those wrongly accused? If I suffer, but I get 10 innocent people released, that would be my wish." Sun Fuqie, in shame, withdrew from his presence. Meanwhile, when the imperial messenger reached Qing Prefecture to verify Cui's actions, the prisoners sentenced to death had no objections, stating to the imperial messenger that Cui judged correctly and that they deserved to die.

At a later point, when Cui served as assistant minister of census, there was a time when he was reporting a number of expenditures—more than 1,000 items—to Emperor Taizong, and he recited them without having his books with him. Emperor Taizong found this odd and unbelievable, and he had the assistant head of the examination bureau of government, Du Zhenglun, fetch the books, and then had Cui re-recite his expenditures. As it turned out, Cui's oral report was correct without flaw, and Emperor Taizong was impressed. Around the same time, the imperial scholar Wang Xuandu (王玄度) had written commentaries for the Confucian classics Classic of History and Classic of Odes, in which he disapproved of commentaries from the Han dynasty scholars Kong Rong and Zheng Xuan. Wang then asked for imperial approval to replace Kong's and Zheng's commentaries with his own, as the official commentaries. Emperor Taizong convened a group of scholars to debate before him, and as Wang was a capable debater, the scholars all could not refute him. As a result, the official Xu Jingzong requested that Wang's commentaries be declared official, and Li Xiaogong requested that it be made coextensive with Kong's and Zheng's commentaries. Cui, however, disapproved of Wang's commentaries, finding them to rely on unreliable interpretations, and so he wrote a submission rejecting Xu's and Li Xiaogong's suggestions. Emperor Taizong, agreeing with Cui, rejected Wang's commentaries.

In 642, Cui was made an imperial attendant. At that time, the ministry of justice had submitted a proposal to increase the penalty for brothers of treasonous individuals, from removal from official posts to death. Emperor Taizong had his key officials discuss this matter, and Gao Shilian, Hou Junji, and Li Shiji were in favor of the increased penalties, while Tang Jian (唐儉), Li Daozong, and Du Chuke (杜楚客) were opposed. Most of the other officials favored the increased penalties, pointing out that during past dynasties, including Han, Cao Wei, and Jin dynasty, the penalty for treason was slaughter of three clans (father's clan, mother's clan, and wife's clan). Cui opposed, pointing out that in even more ancient times—times held ideal by Confucian doctrine—people were not punished for their families' misbehaviors, and the penalty for treason already included the death of sons—that if treasonous individuals did not care about their own children, they would not care about their brothers. Emperor Taizong agreed and rejected the proposal to increase the penalty.

In 643, in the aftermaths of major conflict between Emperor Taizong's sons Li Chengqian (the Crown Prince) and Li Tai (the Prince of Wei), who was Emperor Taizong's favorite son, causing Li Chengqian to plot to overthrow his father in fear that his father would replace him with Li Tai, Cui submitted a secret petition urging for Li Tai to be made crown prince. Emperor Taizong, after some deliberation, deposed both Li Chengqian and Li Tai, holding Li Tai's machinations responsible for Li Chengqian's downfall, and as Cui had wanted Li Tai made crown prince, he drew Emperor Taizong's ire and was demoted to the post of assistant minister of palace supplies. Later, his post was changed to deputy minister of census. During the preparations for Emperor Taizong's campaign against Goguryeo in 644, Wei Ting (韋挺) the minister of imperial shrines was made in charge of shipping troop supplies over the Bohai Sea, and Cui assisted him; Cui also had the additional responsibilities of shipping troop supplies in the Henan region. Cui, believing that the supplies from distant prefectures would not arrive in time, took the initiative of requisitioning the food collected as taxes in the region he was in charge and shipping those as food supplies for the troops. However, in spring 645, during the campaign, Wei was accused of not getting supplies to the troops quickly enough and demoted to commoner status. Cui was accused of not paying sufficient attention to the problems of laborers fleeing conscripted labor and was removed from his post. After the end of the Goguryeo campaign, when Emperor Taizong returned from the front to Zhongshan (中山, in modern Baoding), he returned Cui to imperial service, making him an assistant to the head of the legislative bureau of government. He was soon also made acting minister of justice. Later, when Emperor Taizong was to visit his summer palace Cuiwei Palace (翠微宮), Cui submitted a poem to advise him against doing so in a veiled manner, not wanting Emperor Taizong to be away from Chang'an, and while Emperor Taizong did not accept his veiled advice, he appreciated it.

In 648, Cui was made Zhongshu Shilang (中書侍郎), the assistant head of the legislative bureau, not typically considered a post for a chancellor, but Emperor Taizong gave him the additional designation Canzhi Jiwu (參知機務), making him a de facto chancellor. Emperor Taizong was often listening to his advice, and this brought jealousy from fellow chancellor Chu Suiliang. It happened at this time that there was a person who came to the palace door to air his grievances, and Cui did not report this grievance to Emperor Taizong. (Note: The traditional histories implied that Chu informed this to Emperor Taizong, but did not state outright that Chu did.) Emperor Taizong saw this as hiding relevant events from the emperor and exiled him to Gong Prefecture. (Note: The New Book of Tang gave a different place of exile for him – Lian Prefecture (連州, roughly modern Qingyuan, Guangdong).) Later, after a general pardon, he was allowed to return from exile.

== During Emperor Gaozong's reign ==
After Emperor Taizong's death in 649, his son, Emperor Gaozong, made Cui the prefect of Jian Prefecture (簡州, roughly modern Ziyang, Sichuan). Cui died soon thereafter.
