= Ch'oe Ch'iwŏn =

Korean philosopher (857 – after 924)

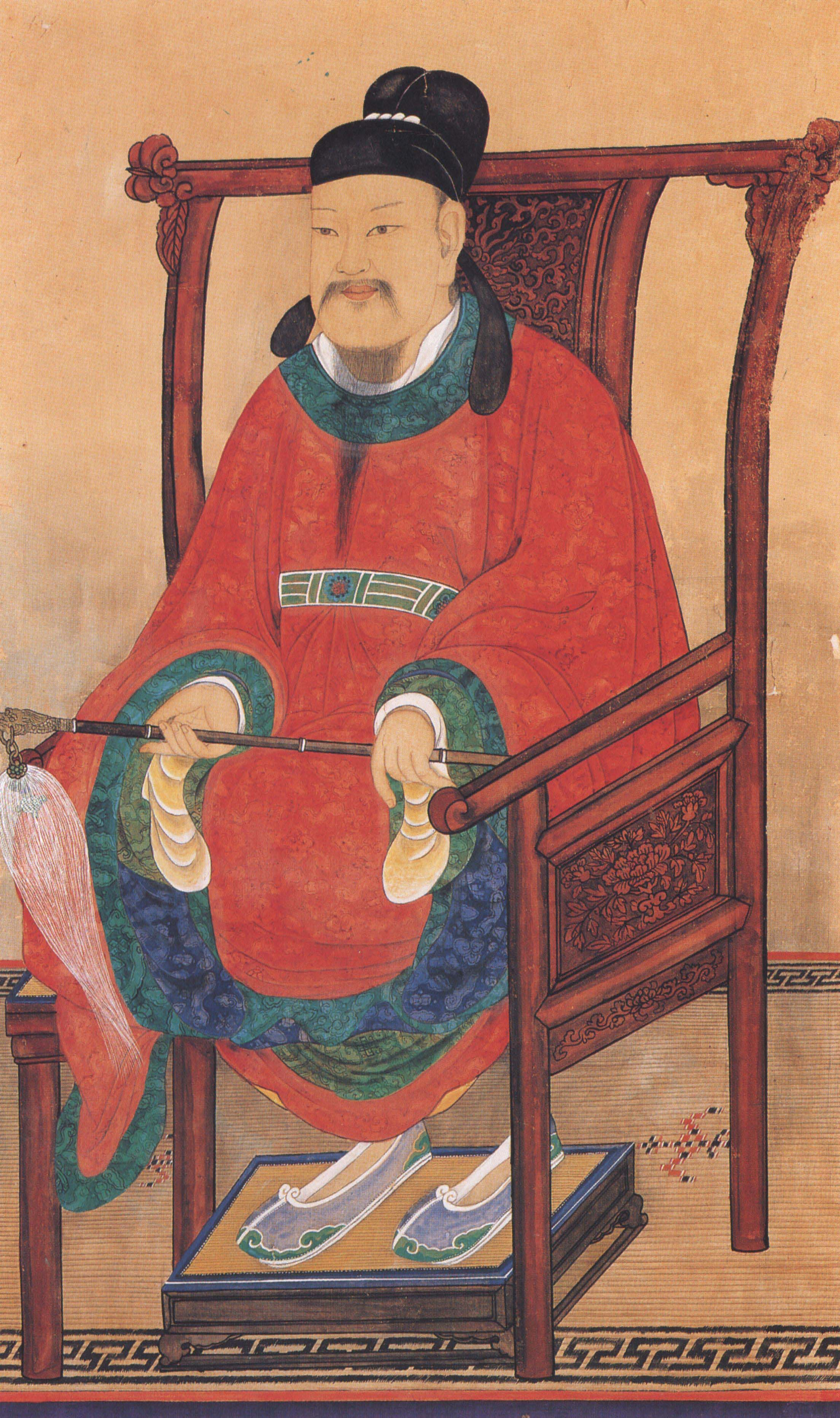
- Portrait of Ch'oe Ch'iwŏn
- Born: 857; Gyeongju, Korea
- Died: unknown
- Occupations: Philosopher, poet

Korean name
- Hangul: 최치원
- Hanja: 崔致遠
- RR: Choe Chiwon
- MR: Ch'oe Ch'iwŏn

Art name
- Hangul: 해운, 고운
- Hanja: 海雲, 孤雲
- RR: Haeun, Goun
- MR: Haeun, Koun

Ch'oe Ch'iwŏn (IPA: [tɕʰø tɕʰiwʌn]; Korean: 최치원; Hanja: 崔致遠; 857–10th century) was a Korean philosopher and poet of the Unified Silla period (668-935). He studied for many years in Tang China, passed the Tang imperial examination, and rose to the high office there before returning to Silla, where he made ultimately futile attempts to reform the governmental apparatus of a declining Silla state.

In his final years, Ch'oe turned more towards Buddhism and became a hermit scholar residing in and around Korea's Haeinsa temple.

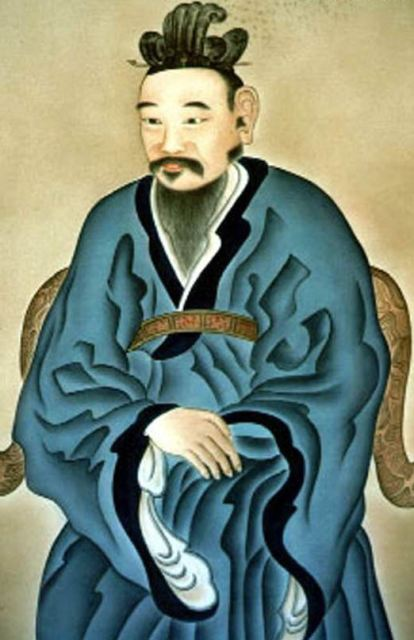
Portrait of Ch'oe Ch'iwŏn.

Ch'oe Ch'iwŏn was also known by the literary names Haeun (IPA: [hɛːun]; Korean: 해운; Hanja: 海雲; lit. "Sea Cloud"), or, more commonly, Koun (IPA: [ko.un]; Korean: 고운; Hanja: 孤雲; lit. "Lonely Cloud"). He is recognized today as the progenitor of the Gyeongju Ch'oe clan.

== Early life and study in Tang ==
Ch'oe Ch'iwŏn was born in the Saryang district of the Silla capital of Gyeongju in 857. He was of the so-called "head rank six" (yukdupum Hanja: 六頭品) class, a hereditary class in Silla's stringent bone rank system affixed to those of mixed aristocratic and commoner birth. As a member of head rank six, Ch'oe was restricted in the level of office he could attain.

Towards the end of Silla, many in the head rank six ranks began to seek opportunities of advancement beyond the traditional confines of the Silla social-political order. One outlet was to become a Buddhist monk. Another was to take up the study of Confucianism. China's Confucian bureaucracy had been adopted to a limited degree by Silla following its unification of the peninsula in 668. Confucianism was well suited to the administration of territory and the buttressing of central authority (that is, royal absolutism). The adoption of Confucian administrative norms and Silla's closer ties with Tang China demanded a highly educated corps of scholar-officials. To meet this need the Silla monarchy turned to the frustrated talents of the head rank six class. Royal support of the head rank six also gave the monarch more leverage against an increasingly hostile aristocracy.

In the early years following unification head rank six students matriculated at Silla's own National Confucian Academy, established in the late 7th century. By the 9th century, however, ambitious Silla students aspired to seek their education at the very source, in the Tang capital of Chang'an (present day Xi'an). It was in the course of the 9th century that the Gyeongju Ch'oe clan nurtured close ties with the Silla monarchy, and as a result many of the Ch'oe clan were sent to matriculate in China with the ultimate goal of passing the Chinese civil service exam and returning to serve the Silla court.

According to the 12th century history work Samguk sagi, when Ch'oe was twelve years of age, in 869, his father sent him to study in Tang, seeing him off with the admonition that if he did not pass the Chinese imperial examination within ten years he would cease to be his son. Within the decade Ch'oe did indeed pass the highest of China's civil service exams, the coveted jinshi degree, and was duly appointed to a prefectural office in the south. Ch'oe went on to serve in China for nearly a decade, even becoming acquainted with Emperor Xizong of Tang (r. 873-888). Ch'oe also won merits for his service under the Tang general Gao Pian in his struggle against the Huang Chao rebellion, a failed uprising which nonetheless ushered in the final years of the crippled Chinese dynasty. With the rebellion put down and peace at least temporarily restored Ch'oe's thoughts turned towards home. One surviving poem, written earlier while Ch'oe was heading to his first official post in China ("ten years of dust" being his ten years spent in preparing for the exam), gave vent to his emotions regarding the native land and family he had not seen in a decade:

海內誰憐海外人
問津何處是通津
本求食祿非求利
只爲榮親不爲身
客路離愁江上雨
故園歸夢日邊春
濟川幸遇恩波廣
願濯凡纓十載塵

Translation:

Who is there within China to sympathize with him without?
I ask for the ferry that will take me across the river,
Originally I sought only food and salary, not the benefits of office,
Only my parents' glory, not my own needs.
The traveler's road, rain falling upon the river;
My former home, dreaming of return, springtime beneath the sun.
Crossing the river I meet with fortune the broad waves.
I wash ten years of dust from my humble cap strings.

The Samguk sagi again tells us that Ch'oe - the consummate Confucian - was thinking of his ageing parents when he requested permission from the Tang emperor to return to Silla. This he was duly granted and he returned home in 885. He was then 28.

== Attempts at reform ==
Soon upon his return to Silla Ch'oe was appointed an instructor and reader at Silla's Confucian Hallim Academy. He was shuffled through various positions, including Minister of War and chief of a variety of regional prefectures. Though in 893 he was appointed chief envoy of a diplomatic mission to Tang China, famine and subsequent upheavals in Silla prevented his journey. Tang fell soon afterward and Ch'oe was never to see China again.

As member of the yukdupum class, Ch'oe had returned to Silla with youthful hopes of reform. Ch'oe was not the first of the yukdupum Confucian literati to attempt to foster reform in the Silla state, however his case is one of the most prominent to come down to us in recorded Korean history. In 894 Ch'oe submitted to Silla's Queen Jinseong (r. 887-897) his "Ten Urgent Points of Reform" for the Silla (시무십여조; 時務十餘條). As with earlier attempts by Ch'oe's predecessors, these were ultimately to fall upon deaf ears. By the time of Ch'oe's return Silla was in an advanced state of collapse. The central monarchy had been greatly weakened by internecine struggle, with power devolving first into the hands of the bone rank aristocracy and then - more ominously for Silla's survival - into the hands of regional warlords who controlled the countryside outside the capital region, and in some cases commanded their own private armies.

== Retirement and later life ==
Few records remain of Ch'oe's middle and late years. Around the year 900 Ch'oe retired from public life and began a period of wandering through numerous Korean locales. As the Samguk sagi relates, "Living in retirement, Ch'oe took up the free life of a mountain sage, building pavilions along rivers and shores, planting pines and bamboo, reading books and writing history, and composing odes to nature. He is known to have dwelled in such places as Namsan in Gyeongju, Bingsan in Gangju, Cheongnyang Temple in Habju, Ssanggye Temple in Jirisan, and a cottage in Habpohyeon." Haeundae District of modern Busan takes its name from Ch'oe's pen-name Haeun as he purportedly was enamored of the location and so built a pavilion there overlooking the beach. A piece of Ch'oe's calligraphy engraved on a rock still survives there.

Eventually Ch'oe settled at Haeinsa Temple where his elder brother Hyŏnjun (현준; 賢俊) served as abbot. His later years are most notable for his lengthy stele inscriptions, hagiographies to Silla's most noted Buddhist priests that have proved a primary source of information on Silla Buddhism.

One well known anecdote regarding Ch'oe in these years regards a putative piece of verse he dispatched to Wang Kŏn, the founder of the Goryeo. Apparently convinced by the greatness of Wang Kŏn, notably by the promulgation of his Ten Injunctions, Ch'oe came to believe that Wang Kŏn had inherited the Mandate of Heaven to succeed the declining Silla dynasty as the ruler of the peninsula. Reflecting this, he secretly sent off a prophetic verse reflecting his support of the new dynasty: "The leaves of the Cock Forest [Silla] are yellow, the pines of Snow Goose Pass [Goryeo] are green." (계림황엽 곡령청송; 鷄林黃葉 鵠嶺靑松). Cock Forest (Gyerim) being an ancient sobriquet for Silla and Snow Goose Pass (Gongnyeong) being the ancestral home of Wang Kŏn, and by association the Goryeo Dynasty. However, this anecdote first appeared in the 12th century Samguk sagi, long after Ch'oe had died and some modern scholars concur that Ch'oe, a native and ardent supporter of Silla, never penned it but that it was attributed to him by a young Goryeo dynasty to buttress its legitimacy and win over the support of young Silla scholars to its enterprise.

The date of Ch'oe's death is unknown, though he was still living as late as 924, the date of one of his surviving stele engravings. One fantastic account relates that Ch'oe's straw slippers were discovered at the edge of the forest on Mt. Gaya (Gayasan), the location of Haeinsa, and that Ch'oe had become a Daoist immortal and ascended into the heavens. More grounded historical theories posit that he committed suicide, but this is ultimately conjecture.

== Later views ==
Several streams emerged from Ch'oe in the long centuries following his death. On the one hand, as Korea became increasingly Confucianized in the late Goryeo and most especially the Joseon period, Ch'oe became one of the most lauded members of Korea's pantheon of Confucianists, with pride of place in the nation's Confucian temple. King Hyeonjong (r. 1009–1031), recognizing Ch'oe's Confucian accomplishments, granted him the posthumous title of Marquis of Bright Culture (문창후; 文昌侯). In the early 13th century his portrait was placed in the national Confucian shrine to become an object of veneration thence forward.

On the other hand, as time passed Ch'oe also came to be revered as a poet, due in great part to the relatively large number of his poems that have survived, all written in Chinese. Around Ch'oe also grew up a rich body of folklore, attributing to him fantastic deeds and supernatural powers.

In the late 19th century, as Korean intellectuals began to reexamine their intellectual and historical roots in the face of increasing national weakness and foreign encroachment, there arose a rising critique of Korea's historical deference to China.

The most articulate voice of such nationalist sentiment was the journalist, historian, and philosopher Shin Chaeho (1880–1936). Shin condemned Ch'oe Ch'iwŏn as one of the most glaring examples of Korean intellectual subservience to China, a pattern of sequacious behavior on the part of Korea's intellectual class (according to Shin) that over the long run weakened Korea's national spirit and made it a slave to "Sadae" ("serving the great") thought.

Ch'oe Ch'iwŏn is now claimed by the Gyeongju Ch'oe clan as their founder. The location of his home in Gyeongju is now a small temple hall dedicated to his memory.

== Writings ==
The relatively extensive extant writings of Ch'oe stand as witness to his importance in late Silla society while also ensuring him a degree of importance among latter generations that has escaped his contemporaries, many of whom, like him, were talented poets, learned officials, and diligent in their attempts at reform.

Besides his lost works like Jewang yeondaeryeok (Chronological History of Monarchs) and others, Ch'oe's surviving writings may be divided roughly into four main categories: official prose (to include memorials, dispatches, etc. during his service both in Tang China and Silla); private prose (on such topics as tea drinking and natural scenery); poetry; and stele inscriptions.

Shortly following Ch'oe's return to Silla in 885 he compiled his various writings, both official and unofficial (to include some poetry) and presented it to King Heongang. The preface to that compilation survives allowing us to know its original contents. However, the entire collection is no longer extant. What does survive is one part entitled the Gyeweon Pilgyeong (계원필경, 桂苑筆耕, "Plowing the Cassia Grove with a Writing Brush"), which is ten volumes made up primarily of official letters and memorials composed while in the service of Tang. This work also includes some private prose.

A sizable collection of Ch'oe's poetry, which was presumably originally included in the work presented to King Heongang cited above, has come down to us through other Korean sources, primarily the Dongmunseon, a Joseon Dynasty collection of Korean poetry. Some verses of his are also included in the 12th century Samguk sagi.

Ch'oe's surviving stele inscriptions, the so-called Sasan bimyeong (사산비명, 四山碑銘, "Four mountain steles") are as follows (all in present-day South Korea):

1. Jingamguksa bimyeong (진감국사비명; 眞鑑國師碑銘) Memorial Stele to Master Jingam [Hyeso] of Ssanggye Temple, 887, at Ssanggye Temple, South Gyeongsang Province.
2. Daesungboksa bimyeong (대숭복사비명; 大崇福寺碑銘) Stele of Daesungbok Temple, 885, Gyeongju (not totally extant).
3. Nanghyehwasang bimyeong (낭혜화상비명; 朗慧和尙碑銘) Memorial Stele to Master Ranghye of Seongju Temple, 890, at Seongju Temple, South Chungcheong Province.
4. Jijeungdaesa bimyeong (지증대사비명; 智證大使碑銘) Memorial Stele to Master Jijeung of Pongam Temple, 924, at Mungyeong, North Gyeongsang Province.

Ch'oe's authorship has been conjectured for the Silla Suijeon (신라수이전, 新羅殊異傳, Silla tales of wonder), the earliest and oldest known collection of Korean Buddhist tales and popular fables. The work is no longer extant but thirteen of its original stories have survived in other works. Almost all scholars agree, however, that Ch'oe was not the author. This seems clear by the fact that one of the tales included in the collection was a fable of Ch'oe Ch'iwŏn, the Koun Ch'oe Ch'iwŏn chŏn (고운 최치원전; 孤雲崔致遠傳). Likewise, in the early 20th century Ch'oe was put forward as the author of the Yuseolgyeonghak daejang (유설경학대장; 類說經學隊仗), a Confucian pedagogical work. Based upon the nature of the language and expressions employed, scholars are also fairly unanimous in denying this to be a work of Ch'oe.

== See also ==
- Korean Confucianism
- Munmyo
- Korean philosophy
- Silla
