= Gao Chengyong =

Chinese serial killer and rapist

- 高承勇
- Born: 10 November 1964; Yuzhong County, Gansu, China
- Died: 3 January 2019 (aged 54); Baiyin, Gansu, China
- Other name: "Chinese Jack the Ripper"
- Status: Executed
- Convictions: Murder (11 counts); Sexual assault Robbery; Defiling of a corpse
- Penalty: Death

Details
- Victims: 11
- Span of crimes: 1988–2002
- Country: China
- States: Baiyin; Gansu; Baotou; Inner Mongolia
- Date apprehended: 26 August 2016

Gao Chengyong (Chinese: 高承勇; 10 November 1964 – 3 January 2019) was a Chinese serial killer and rapist. He mutilated the corpses of his victims, leading to his nickname of the "Chinese Jack the Ripper" in Chinese media. He is thought to have killed eleven women between 1988 and 2002.

Sentenced to death and stripped of all his assets, he was executed in January 2019.

== Murders ==
Over the course of 14 years, Gao raped, murdered and mutilated eleven women: ten in Baiyin, Gansu, and one in Baotou, Inner Mongolia. His youngest victim was seven years old. The first murder is thought to have originated in a grocery store he managed with his wife in Baiyin. He would normally operate in daytime and follow his victims home, where he would strike.

Gao raped his victims sometimes while they were alive and sometimes after having stabbed them to death. He removed the reproductive organs of some women after killing them and cut the hands and breasts off of at least one of his victims, leading to the media comparing him to the unidentified serial killer Jack the Ripper, who committed at least five murders in the East End of London in the 1880s. He also robbed his victims.

Gao's wife stated that she noticed that her husband would disappear from the house for days at a time; however she never suspected him to be a serial killer. Because he always came home with money, she assumed that he had left to do casual work.

=== Victims ===
(Note: Victims are identified only by their surnames.)

- 26 May 1988: Bai (白), 23. Killed inside her home on Yongfeng Street, Baiyin. Bai's neck was cut open; her top was pushed above her breasts, her lower body was naked, and her upper body was stabbed 26 times. Fingerprints were found at the scene, but could not be identified.
- 27 July 1994: Shi (石), 19. A temporary employee of the Baiyin Power Supply Bureau, killed inside her single-room dormitory. Her neck was cut open, and her upper body had been stabbed 36 times.
- 28 March 1997: Li (李), 21. The only known victim from Baotou. Found in her Hondlon District apartment lying on her back in bed, tied up with a rope, with a broom stuffed into her mouth. Her pants were taken off, and her lower body was exposed. There were traces of semen left behind on her legs.
- 13 January 1998: Yang (杨), 29. Killed inside her home on Shengli Street, Baiyin. Yang's neck was cut open; her ears and a piece of skin from the top of her head had been cut off. Her body was not discovered until 16 January.
- 19 January 1998: Deng (邓), 27. Killed inside her home on Shuichuan Road, Baiyin. Deng's neck was cut open, her left nipple was bitten off, and a 30x24cm piece of flesh on her back had been removed.
- 30 July 1998: Yao (姚), 7. The daughter of Zeng (曾), an employee of the Baiyin Power Supply Bureau. Yao was strangled to death by Gao during an attempted burglary, and her body was hidden in a closet. Traces of semen were discovered on her legs.
- 30 November 1998: Cui (崔), 23. An employee of the Baiyin Company's Fluoride Salt Factory, killed inside her apartment on Dongshan Road, Baiyin. Her upper body had been stabbed 22 times, and both her breasts, hands, and genitals had been removed. Her body was discovered by her mother.
- 20 November 2000: Luo (罗), 28. An employee of the Baiyin Cotton Mill, killed inside her home. Her neck was cut open, and her hands had been cut off.
- 22 May 2001: Zhang (张), 27. A nurse from the Baiyin District Maternal and Child Health Station, killed inside her apartment on Shuichuan Road. She had been tied up with a rope and stabbed in her neck 16 times.
- 23 May 2001: Chang (常), 21. An employee of the Kaihong Building Hotel in Baiyin, bound with rope and stabbed to death during an attempted burglary at her place of work.
- 5 February 2002: Zhu (朱), 28. A guest staying on the third floor of the Taolechun Hotel in Baiyin. Zhu was strangled unconscious, raped, and stabbed to death by Gao during an attempted burglary.

== Arrest, sentencing and execution ==
Police linked the eleven murders for the first time in 2004 and offered a reward of 200,000 yuan. Gao avoided capture until his uncle was arrested for an unrelated, minor offence. During a routine DNA test, a close familial relationship to the killer was established. Gao was subsequently arrested at the grocery store where he worked in Baiyin on 26 August 2016. According to the Ministry of Public Security, he confessed to the eleven murders. Gao was sentenced to death and stripped of all his assets on 30 March 2018, and was executed on 3 January 2019; the method of execution used was not disclosed.

== Personal life ==
Gao was married and had two children. He was from Qingcheng Town, Yuzhong County, Lanzhou, Gansu.

== See also ==
- List of serial killers in China
- List of serial killers by number of victims
