= Choi Seung-yong (baseball) =

South Korean baseball player (born 2001)

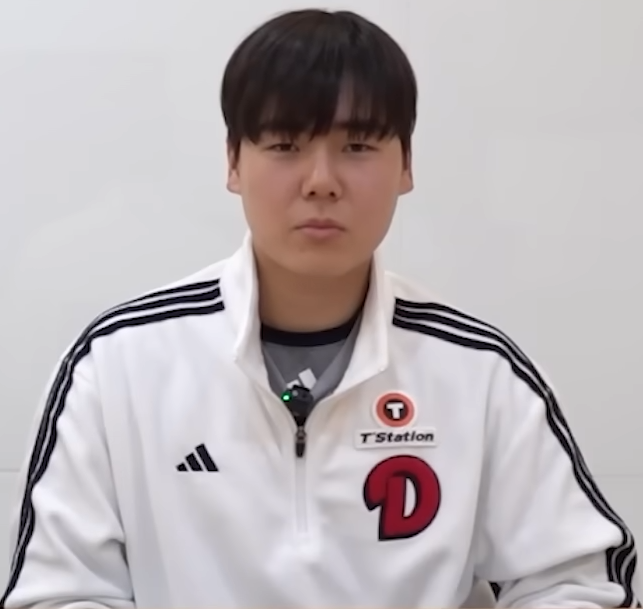
- Choi in 2025

Doosan Bears – No. 28
- Pitcher
- Born: 11 May 2001 (age 24); Namyangju, Gyeonggi Province, South Korea
- Bats: Left Throws: Left

KBO debut
- 2 September, 2021, for the Doosan Bears

KBO statistics (through 2025)
- Win–loss record: 13–20
- Earned run average: 4.60
- Strikeouts: 254
- Stats at Baseball Reference

Teams
- Doosan Bears (2021–present)

Choi Seung-yong (Korean: 최승용; born 11 May 2001) is a South Korean professional baseball player for the Doosan Bears of the KBO League.

== International career ==
He was selected to play in the 2023 Asia Professional Baseball Championship for South Korea.

He was also selected for South Korea to play in the 2024 WBSC Premier12, where he appeared in 2 games against Japan and Australia. South Korea were knocked out of the competition after the Opening Round after 3 wins and 2 losses.
