= Anita Tsoy =

Russian singer (born 1971)

Anita Tsoy Анита Цой
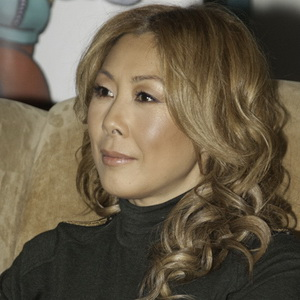
- Tsoy in 2013

Background information
- Born: Anna Sergeyevna Kim; 7 February 1971 (age 55)
- Origin: Moscow, Soviet Union
- Genres: Pop; pop-rock; dance
- Occupation: Singer-songwriter
- Instrument: Vocals
- Years active: 1997–present
- Labels: Soyuz (1997); New Hollywood International (1998); Real Records (2003); Universal Music Russia (2005 – present)
- Website: anitatsoy.ru

Anita Sergeyevna Tsoy (Russian: Анита Сергеевна Цой; born Anna Sergeyevna Kim; Russian: Анна Сергеевна Ким; 7 February 1971) is a Russian singer-songwriter of Korean descent. She received the title of People's Artist of Russia (2021).

== Early life ==
Anita's grandfather, seeking free education, emigrated from Korea to the Russian Far East. He, his wife and his children were later caught up in the 1937 deportation of the Koryo-saram to Central Asia. Anita's mother was born in 1944 in Tashkent, Uzbek SSR, Soviet Union and successfully graduated from the Moscow State University and became a chemistry doctor.

Tsoy's mother did everything she could to make her daughter educated in all kinds of arts. Anita's favourite one became music. She began violin lessons at a young age; she later studied piano, flute, and guitar.

When Tsoy became an adult, her mother was branded a "class enemy" in the 1970s in response to her record of speaking out in support of Nobel Peace Prize-winning dissident Andrei Sakharov. For her dissidence, she was briefly committed to a mental institution and became a permanent invalid. After leaving school Tsoy attended the teacher training college, then law faculty at Moscow State University, where she met her husband Sergey Tsoy.

== Career ==
After graduation, rather than becoming a teacher or lawyer, she began saving up money in order to launch a singing career, while her husband began working as a press secretary for Moscow mayor Yury Luzhkov in 1994. Her first album Polyot (Полёт; Flight) was released in 1997; she kept it a secret from her husband until after she had already signed the contract with her production company.

In 1998 her second album, named "Черный лебедь" ("The Black Swan") was released and in 1999 a concert show "Черный лебедь или храм любви" ("The Black Swan or a Love Palace") was held in the concert hall "Rossiya". This show was accepted as "Best Show of the Year" and Anita won an "Ovation" She went to the United States in 2003 to record an English-language album, where she worked with cinematic composer Lee Holdridge; while there, she was offered a five-year contract as a solo vocalist in the Cirque du Soleil, but turned it down in order to return to Russia and be near her family.

She records her third Russian dance solo-album "1000000 минут" ("1000000 Minutes") in 2003, which was introduced to public in the "Elevator" club, a former factory in Moscow. In 2005 a major show-concert "ANITA" was held in the "Rossiya" Concert Hall, Moscow, featuring high technology decorations like large LCD-screens and fountains on the stage. The show was considered to be one of the most successful ones in Russia and was released on DVD by Universal Music. Tsoy recorded her fourth album "На восток" ("To The East") in 2007 and changed her image greatly since the 2003; she turns to manga-anime style. In autumn of the same year she performs with her "To The East" show, which attracted more than ten thousand people. Following the show, the DVD-recording of this live concert was released.

Both "ANITA" and "To The East" shows are considered to be one of the best live-performances in Russia and the recordings of these concerts were shown on Channel One, Muz-TV and other influentable Russian channels.

Anita recorded 5 albums in total and won more than 10 major awards for both performing and charity during her 13-year career as a solo artist.

She appeared in the fourth season of ice show contest Ice Age.

== Summary of music career ==
Tsoy is known for regularly changing her music style and image. She began performing as a nearly rock artist in 1997, later turned to dance music, and after 2006 several music styles present in her songs: Viktor Tsoi's rock followed by blues, R&B, and Eastern styled pop

=== 1997 – In memory of Viktor Tsoi ===
The first album "Полет" ('Flight") was recorded in 1997 and was named after Anita's first hit – single "Полет" ('Flight"). Most songs from it are written in rock style, similar to the Kino band's where acoustic guitar plays the main role. This is because Anita was a great fan of theirs when she was young. Another hit – "Мама"("Mother") – was dedicated to orphaned children.

=== "The Black Swan" of Russian pop ===
In 1998 Anita's second album was released, called "The Black Swan" ("Черный лебедь"). Notable songs from this record are: "Far Away"("Далеко") and "Return"("Возвращайтесь") The second one was remixed in 2009 and became a key – single for the singer's "To Remember so that Life Continues" ("Помнить, чтобы жизнь продолжалась") charity concert tour. In this album's tracks mostly guitar, electronic and percussion instruments take place and most songs are written in a pop-rock style.

=== 2003 – Switch to dance music ===
In 2003 Anita recorded her third Russian album, called "1000000 Minutes" ("1000000 минут"). Her first two records and this one can't be compared at all – almost all songs here are composed in a Dance style. This album has four singles which became super – hits on radiostations: a title – track "1000000 Minutes" ("Миллион минут"), "Only for You" ("Одному тебе"), "Is that Love?" ("Это ли любовь?") and "Christmas Toys" ("Новогодние игрушки").

=== 2007 – To The East ===
From 2003 till 2007 there were no recordings released due to large piracy problems on the media market in Russia.

The album "To The East" ("На восток") was recorded in 2007 by Universal Music company. It is filled inside out with hit singles: seven of eleven tracks were tuned on radios and two of them: the title song "To The East" ("На восток") and "The Sky" ("Небо") became very popular among Russian people; Anita won two "Golden Gramophone" statuettes for these singles: one in 2006 and the other one – in 2007 (The "To The East" ("На восток") single had been written a year earlier before the album was recorded). Combinations of guitar, percussion instruments and electronic music made this album's songs well distinguished from other artists' ones. Anita and Universal Music announced that all the income from the album sales was going to be delivered to orphan asylums.

== Charity ==
Aside from singing Anita Tsoy is known as an active contributor to charity. In 2001 she opened a charity foundation "Anita", which helped many children with congenital disablement . She also works with such major charity companies as Save the Children and UNICEF.

In 2009 a concert tour was organized and all the profits from the concerts were sent to families, whose relatives died due to terrorist actions and coal mines collapses. The concerts were held in the cities of Grozny, Beslan, Budyonnovsk and many others, located in Caucasian and Siberian areas. The tour was named "To Remember so that Life Continues" ("Помнить, чтобы жизнь продолжалась"). Several months before in the Barvikha Hall, Moscow a big concert was arranged, where mostly businessmen and celebrities had been invited to. The proceeds amounted to about €160,000 – this amount of money was delivered to more than 50 children who were victims of the Chechen massacre in Beslan.

== Current career ==
Anita Tsoy was appointed as an "Ambassador of Korean Culture and Tourism" between Russia and South Korea by South Korean president Roh Moo-hyun during his official visit to Russia in 2004.

It was announced on the singer's official site that a new album, called "Глубина"("Depth") is going to be recorded. The release date is not mentioned. Anita Tsoy is going to play in the upcoming "Michael Strogoff" French musical in 2010 – 2011.

In April and May 2022, Tsoy participated in a series of concerts organized in order to support the 2022 Russian invasion of Ukraine. In January 2023, Ukraine imposed sanctions on Anita for her support of the invasion.

== Albums ==
- "Полет" ("Flight") – 1997
- "Черный лебедь" ("The Black Swan") – 1998
- "I'll remember you" (Recorded in the USA) – 2000
- "1000000 минут" ("1000000 minutes") – 2003
- "На восток" ("To The East") – 2007
- "Твоя А" ("Your A") – 2011

== Live concerts ==
- "Полет к новым мирам" ("A Flight to New Worlds") – 1998
- "Черный лебедь или храм любви" ("The Black Swan or a Love Palace") – 1999, 2000 (symphonic version)
- "1000000 минут" ("1000000 Minutes") – 2003
- "ANITA" – 2005
- "На восток" ("To The East") – 2007
- "Помнить, чтобы жизнь продолжалась" ("To Remember so that Life Continues") – 2009 (Charity Concert Tour)
- "THE BEST" – 2010

== Awards ==
- "Honoured Worker of Kuzbass for active participation in charity, 2009
- "Golden Gramophone", 2007
- "Golden Gramophone", 2006
- A True Professional of Russia, 2005
- "Mezenat" for active participation in charity, 2004
- "Pillar" for the artist's talent, 2004
- "For Russia's renewal", 2004
- Meritorious Artist of Russia, 2003
- "Olympia" for active participation in charity, 2002
- National Musical Prize "Ovation" – Best Show of the Year, 1999
- National Musical Prize "Ovation" – A Discovery of the Year, 1998
