= Tang dynasty tomb figures =

Tomb figures of the Tang dynasty

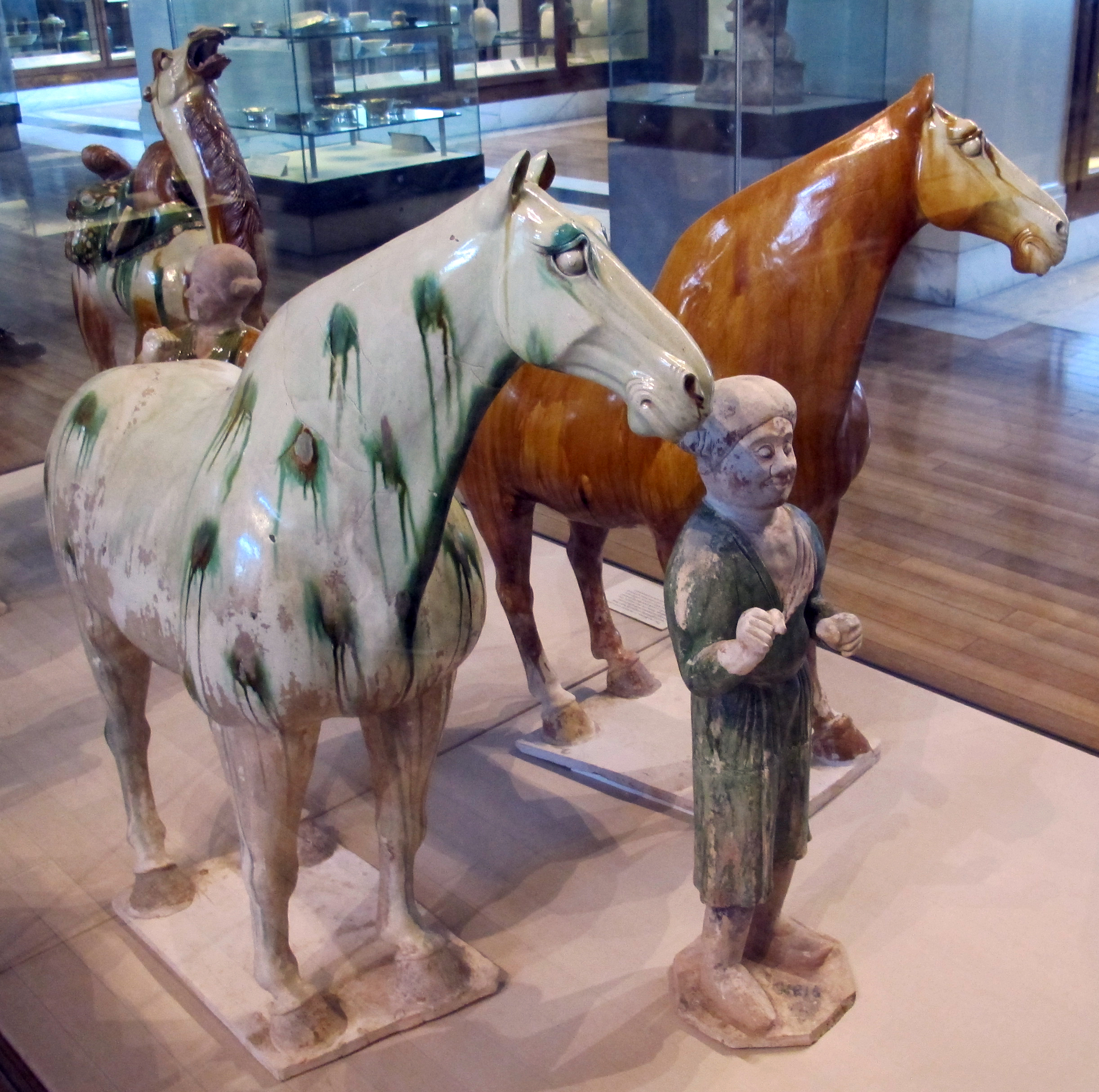
Two sancai-glazed horses and groom, c. 728, from the tomb of the general Liu Tingxun

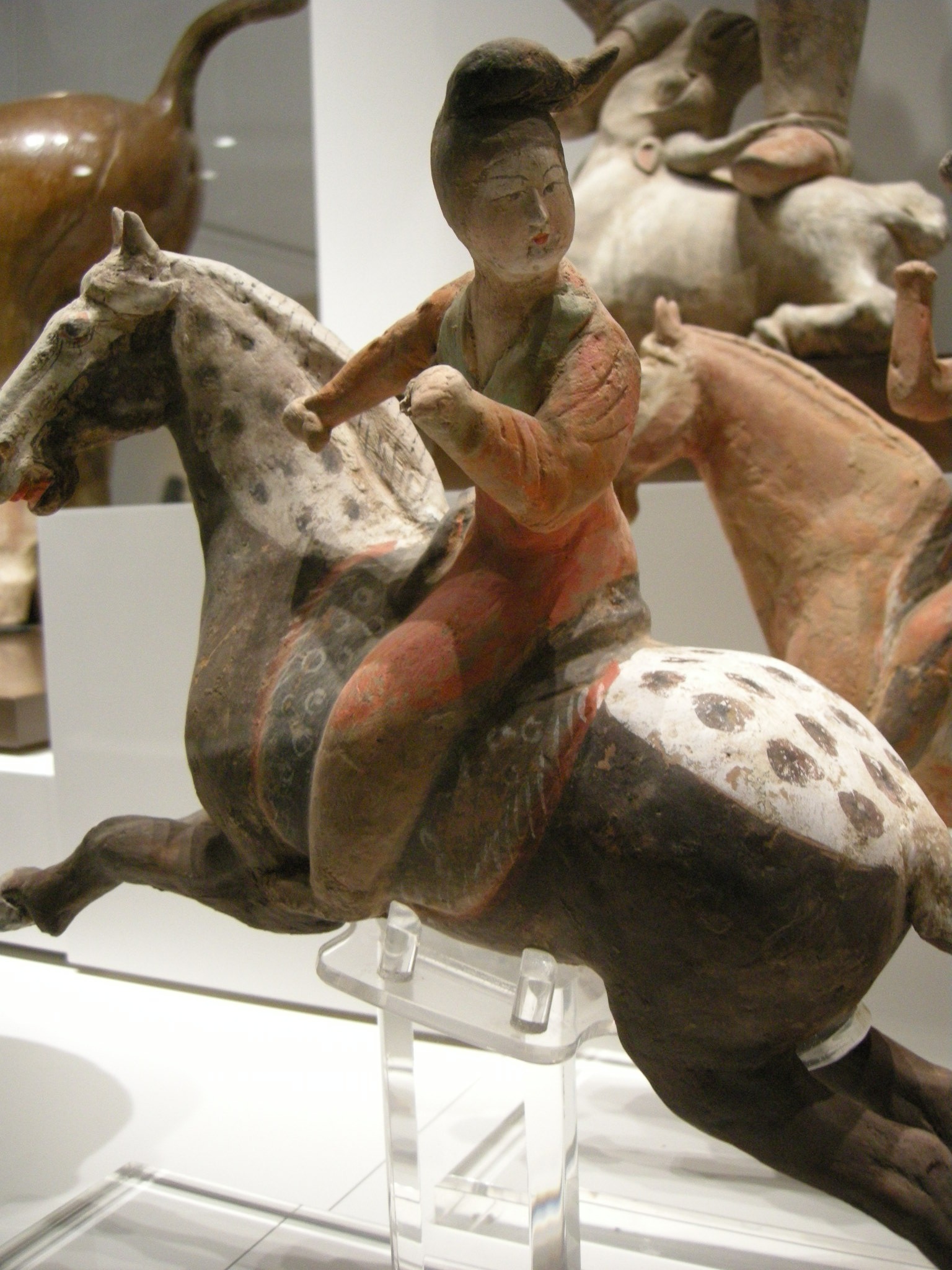
Painted cross-dressing woman playing polo

Tang dynasty tomb figures are pottery figures of people and animals made in the Tang dynasty of China (618–906) as grave goods to be placed in tombs. There was a belief that the figures represented would become available for the service of the deceased in the afterlife. The figures are made of moulded earthenware with colour generally being added, though often not over the whole figure, or in naturalistic places. Where the colouring was in paint it has often not survived, but in many cases it was in sancai ("three-colour") ceramic glaze, which has generally lasted well.

The figures, called mingqi in Chinese, were most often of servants, soldiers (in male tombs) and attendants such as dancers and musicians, with many no doubt representing Gējìs. In burials of people of high rank there may be soldiers and officials as well. The animals are most often horses, but there are surprising numbers of both Bactrian camels and their Central Asian drivers, distinguished by thick beards and hair, and their facial features. The depictions are realistic to a degree unprecedented in Chinese art, and the figures give archaeologists much useful information about life under the Tang. There are also figures of the imaginary monster "earth spirits" and the fearsome human Lokapala (or tian wang), both usually in pairs and acting as tomb guardians to repel attacks by both spirits and humans. Sets of the twelve imaginary beasts of the Chinese Zodiac are also found, usually unglazed.

The figures represent a development of earlier traditions of Chinese tomb figures, and in the Tang elaborate glazed figures are restricted to north China, very largely to the areas around the capitals. They "virtually disappear" from 755 when the highly disruptive An Lushan Rebellion began, which probably affected the kilns in Henan and Hebei making the pieces as well as their elite clientele. A much diminished tradition continued in later dynasties until the Ming. The use of sancai glazing on figures was restricted to the upper classes, and production was controlled by the imperial bureaucracy, but a single burial of a member of the imperial family might contain many hundreds of figures.

== Context and meaning ==
A thousand years before the Tang figures, the Tomb of Marquis Yi of Zeng (d. about 433 BC) contained the bodies of 22 musicians, as well as the instruments they played. Traces of wooden figures wearing textiles are known from similar dates, and the First Emperor's Terracotta Army is famous; his funeral also involved the killing and burial of many servants and animals, including all his childless concubines. Excavated Han dynasty tombs contained bronze or pottery figures of horses, and often groups of soldiers, well below life-size, in the tombs of commanders. Lower down the social scale, pottery models of houses and animals were common, and continued into the Tang. By the time of the Sui dynasty (581–618), the pattern of Tang tomb figures was essentially established, though the polychromy of sancai colours did not appear until the Tang.

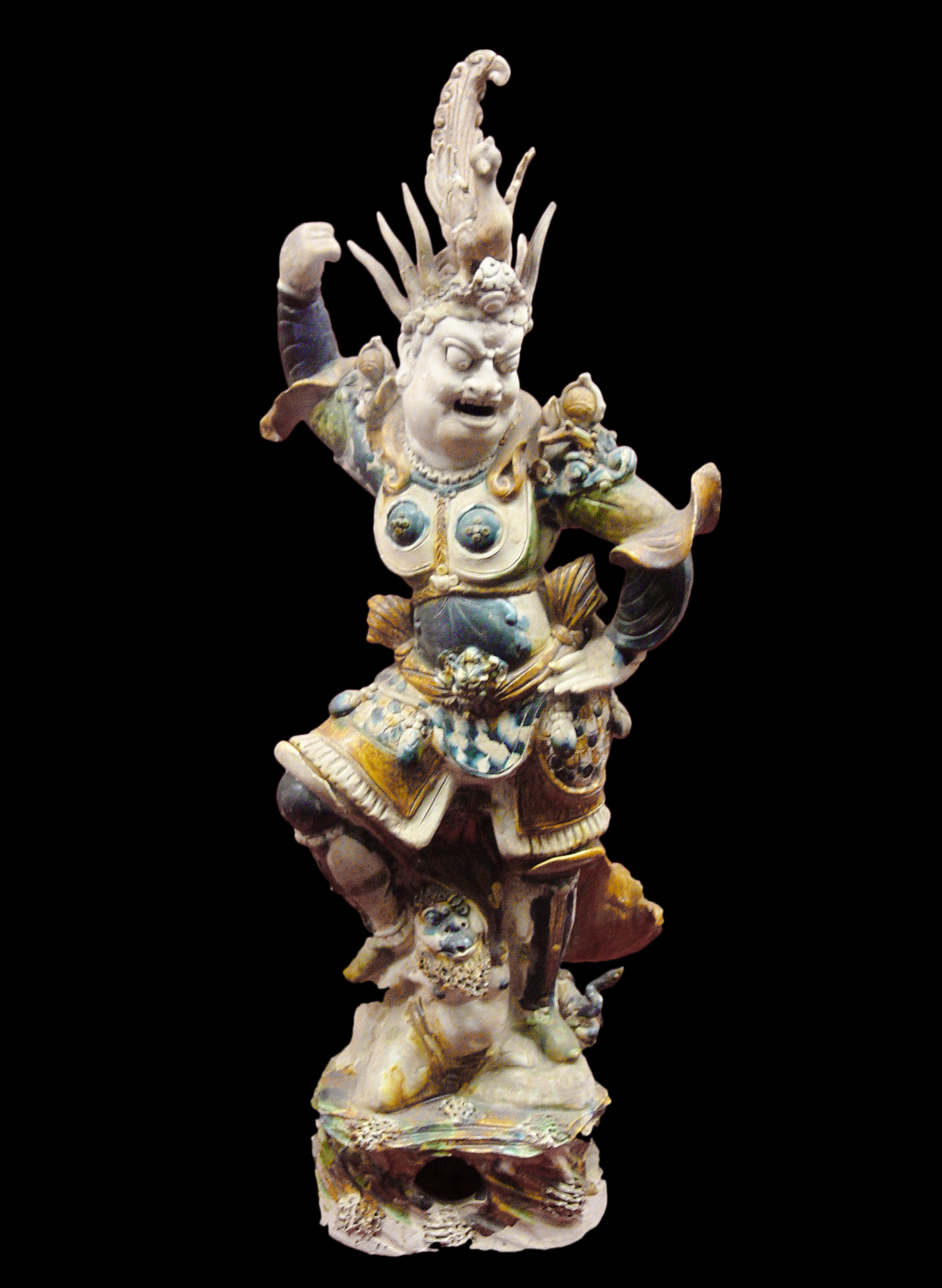
Lokapala guardian figure

The size and number of the figures in a grave depended on the rank of the deceased, as did the number that were glazed. Servants and farm animals were often glazed, painted or slip-painted white, or brown in the case of animals. The figures were paraded on carts as part of the funeral procession. They were then lined up outside the tomb before the coffin was taken inside. Once this was in place they were taken inside the tomb and arranged in the tomb, often along the sloping access way to the underground burial chamber, or in an ante-chamber to it. In large tombs there were niches built into the tomb walls for them to occupy.

Until recent years most pieces came from excavations that were not done by archaeologists and knowledge of the context of pieces was lacking. The important tomb of the Tang Princess Li Xianhui (or Yongtai) from 705 was discovered in 1960 in the Qianling Mausoleum complex, and professionally excavated from 1964, the first of a number of excavations of major tombs, though others have been left deliberately undisturbed. It had been robbed in the past, probably soon after the burial, but the thieves had not bothered with the 777 unglazed and painted and around 60 glazed tomb figures (now mostly Shaanxi History Museum). These were mostly in "solid ranks" in stepped niches off the long sloping entrance way.

Grand tombs were conceived as "a personalized paradise mirroring the best aspects of the earthly world", approached by a spirit road with stone statues, and ministered to by priests in temples and altars around the mound. Underground, they also contained extensive frescos with painted representations of the same types of figure as the pottery, and the images in the two media worked together to recreate a palace geography evoking the residence and lifestyle of the deceased before death. The entrance ramp recreated the approach to a grand palace, the sections with frescos and figure niches reflecting the various enclosures and courtyards of the sprawling palace complexes of Tang royalty. Niches with horses and grooms were nearer the entrance than those with musicians and court ladies; niches were typically flanked by frescos of attendants in charge of that area. This was imagined as much from the tomb chamber outwards as from the tomb entrance inwards; despite Chinese concepts of Hell and paradise, the spirit of the deceased was believed to continue to inhabit and roam the tomb, and the intention was to provide suitable facilities of all kinds. Indeed, within tomb complexes such as the Qianling Mausoleum complex, visits by the deceased to the neighbouring tombs of the imperial family, accompanied by huge processions, were envisaged, and saddled pottery horses stood waiting for the entourage, for visits or hunting.

== Technique ==
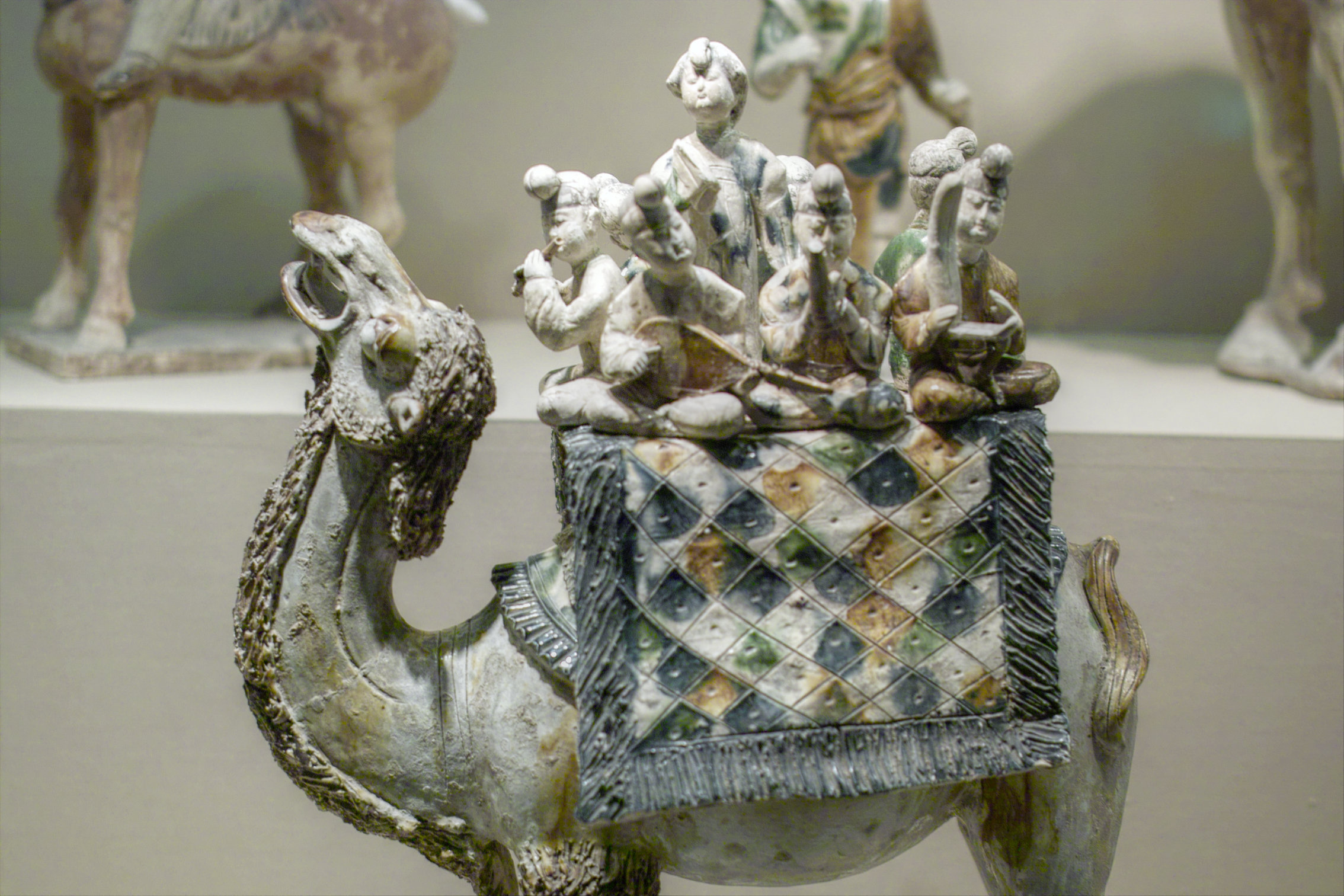
A band of musicians mounted on a camel

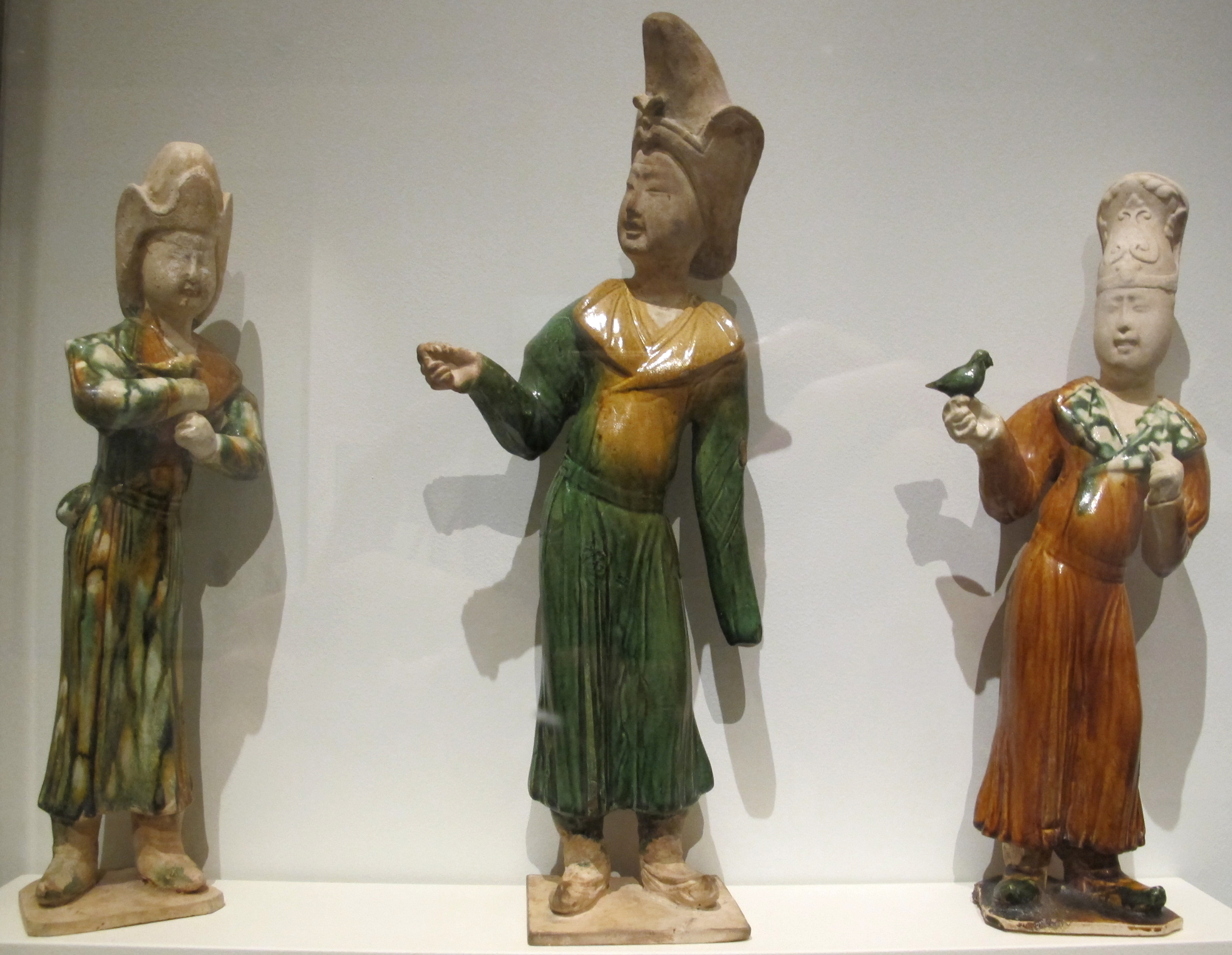
Three sancai falconers

The size of figures varies considerably, from about 10 to 110 centimetres high for a standing human figure, and about 55 to 120 or more for the largest types, the beasts and guardians. Different scales of figures were usually mixed within tombs, depending on the status of the people or animals depicted. There is some indication that glazed and unglazed figures may have been made at different kilns. The figures are low-fired earthenware, since strength and durability were not required. The clay body fires to a "whitish" colour, except for a smaller group of less fine reddish pieces, normally covered in white slip.

The figures are moulded, usually from several pieces, with the head always made separately, and the larger animals in the most parts. The various pieces were luted together before firing, with the opportunity taken to vary identical figures by joining the heads at slightly different angles. The clay was often worked by hand, luting on small extra details and textures, and sometimes working on the surface with tools. In earlier figures a joint line running up the side of the body can often be seen. For an unknown reason, the heads of horses either face straight ahead or turn to the left; they almost never turn to the right.

When the clay work was complete, a white slip was applied all over, then any glaze was added to the figure before firing. Smaller figures might have a clear or slightly yellow glaze, and in larger ones the glaze was often kept off the face and hands, which were painted after firing. Sui and early Tang figures, before sancai was used, normally have the transparent glaze. The application of the coloured glazes can be very variable; in many pieces the colours are carefully applied to different parts of the figures, but in others "they have been splashed on without regard for design or contour". A cobalt blue was added to the sancai palette during the period, and at least one horse is partly coloured blue. Some figures had elements in wood, such as weapons, polo-sticks, or rope halters for horses and camels, which have not survived.

== Style ==
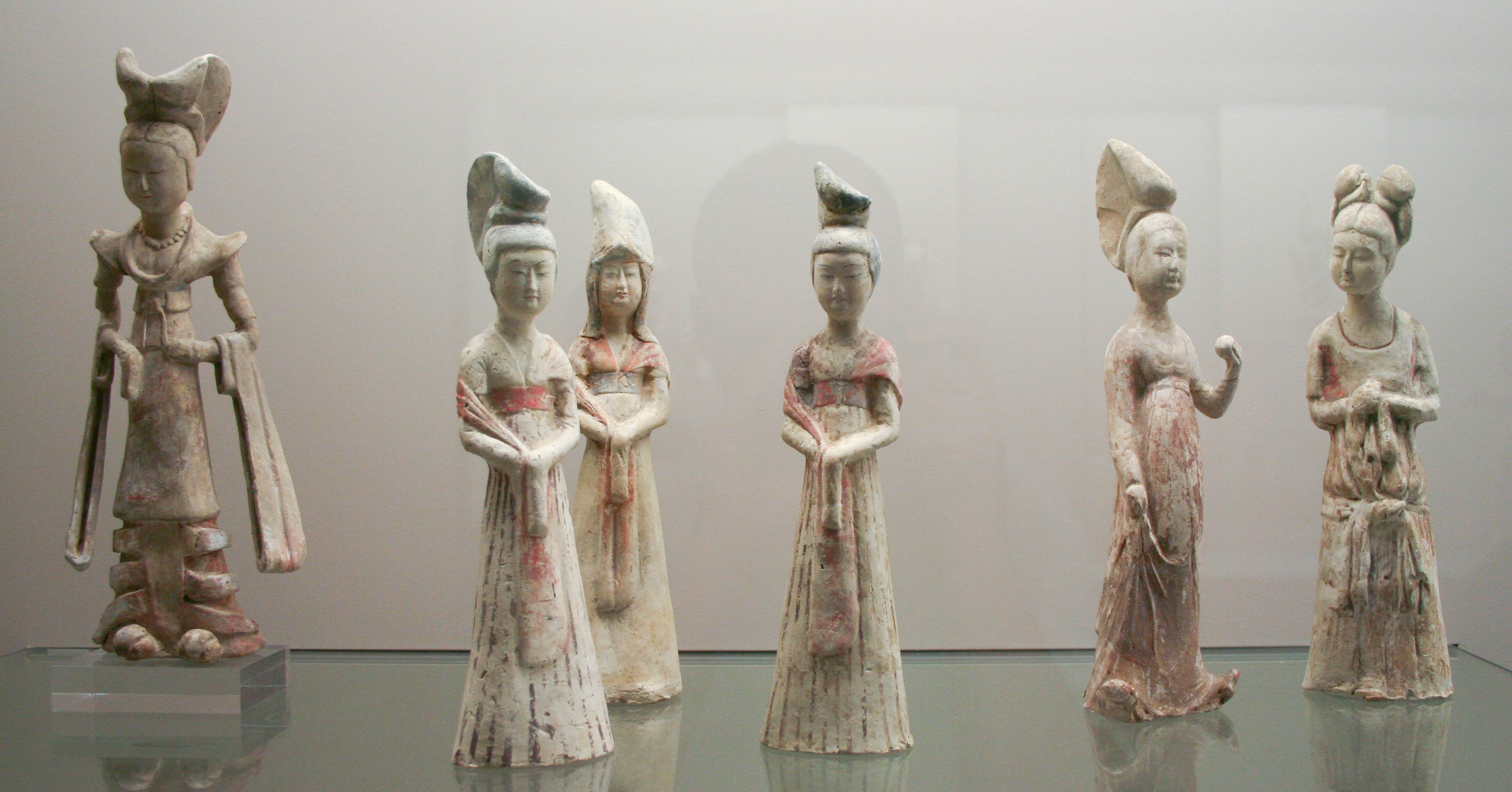
Group of fashionably-dressed female attendants

The best period for the figures lasted only about 50 years, to the An Lushan Rebellion of 755, a period of innovation, unprecedented realism and an interest in showing psychological types in several media for Chinese art. The figures share with Buddhist monumental sculpture of the period conventions, derived from further west, that show "appropriate detail of muscle which yet departs from reality at many points". The horse figures reflect the same ideal as seen in contemporary paintings, and it is uncertain in which medium the type first arose.

With exception of the Zodiac figures, which were also the only type to increase in popularity after the Tang, the figures are "more closely related to the metropolitan and Buddhist attitudes than to the magical aspects of rural beliefs and a pattern of behaviour governed by superstitions or shamanistic beliefs of the local farming communities", which partly accounts for their failure to return after the 750s, along with a preference for new types of grave goods.

== Types of figures ==
The group of 13 Tang dynasty tomb figures of Liu Tingxun, a general who died in 728, represent a fine group of the usual major figures, all in sancai. There are four tomb guardians, and pairs of officials (these are all on a similar scale), horses and camels, plus three grooms, this group on a considerably smaller scale.

=== Women ===
The earliest figures, from the 7th century, are "rather simple and less well-executed than later ones". The women are tall and slim, whereas by the mid-8th century a plumper figure had become the norm, with faces that are "fat, heavily brooding and vacuous". It has been suggested that this change in taste was provoked by the famous imperial concubine Yang Guifei, who had a full figure, although it seems to begin by about 725, when she was a child.

There may be groups of women as dancers or small seated orchestras of musicians, and some sitting figures appear to be beautifying themselves. More rarely, there are female riders and polo players, wearing male dress, which was usual for Tang women when riding, and apparently a fashion in the capital on other occasions. The period was one of unusual freedom for wealthy women in China, and the figures reflect this.

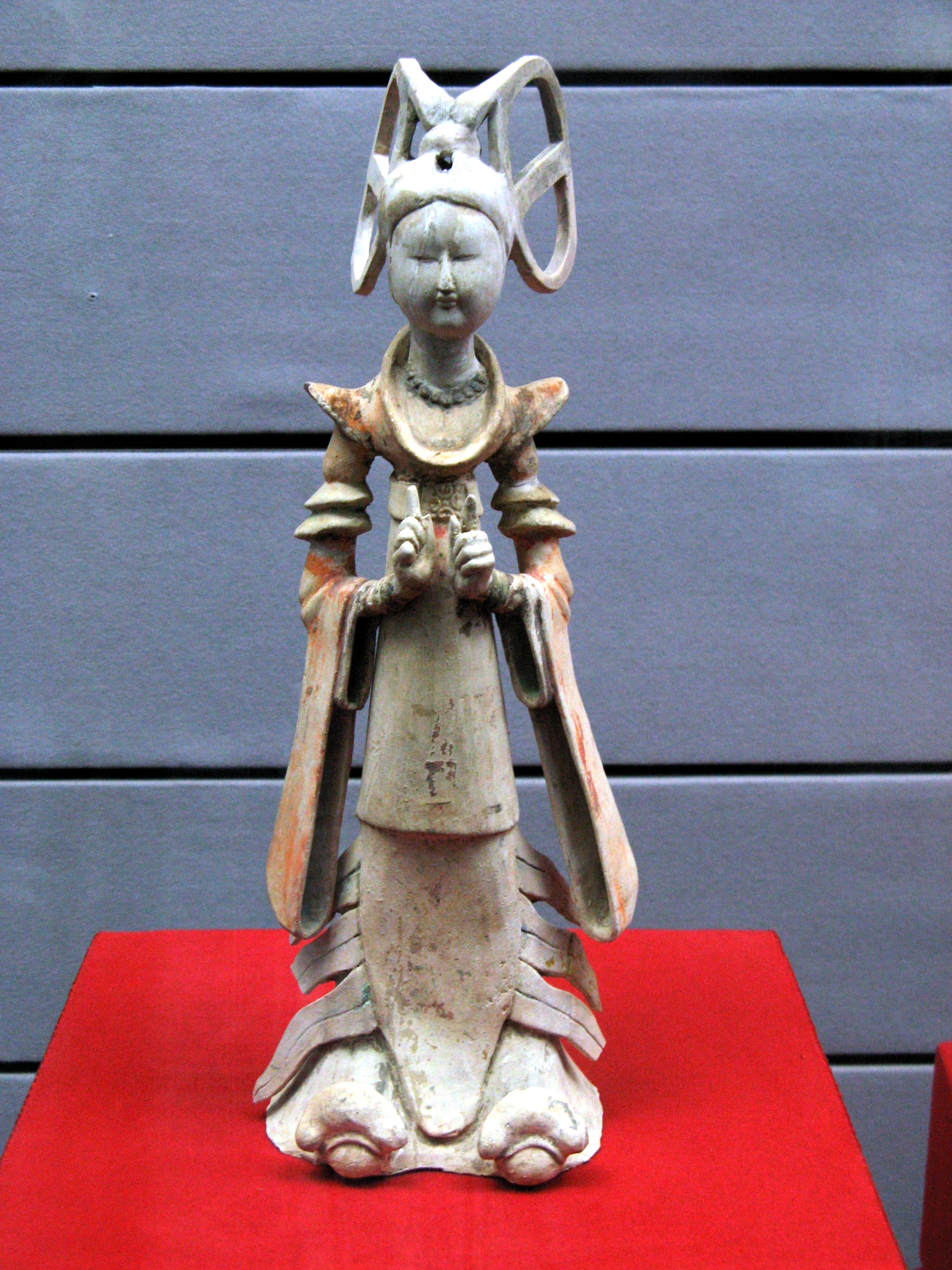
Fashionably-dressed female attendant of the early, slender, type

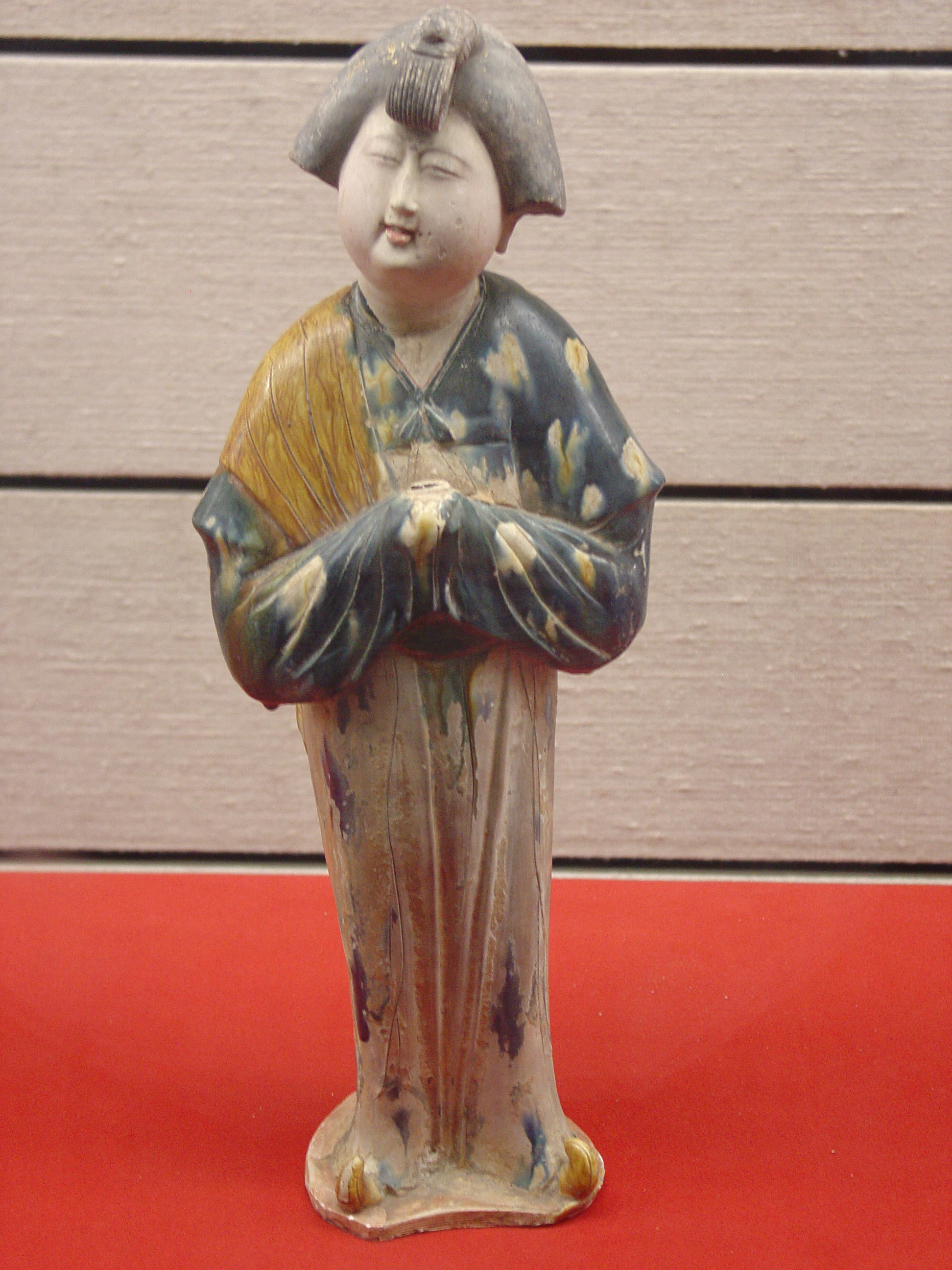
Woman in the plumper 8th-century style

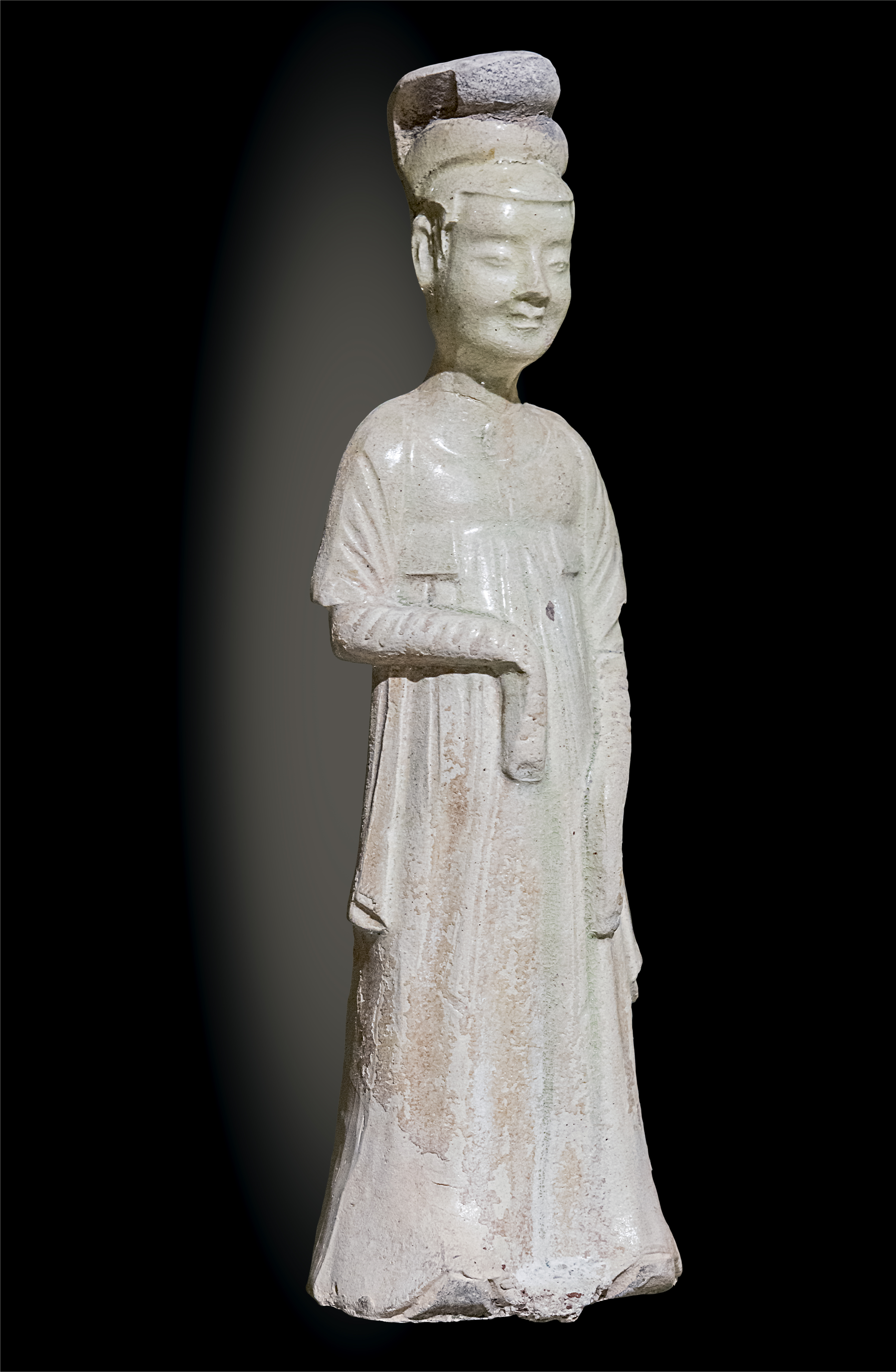
White-glazed dancer

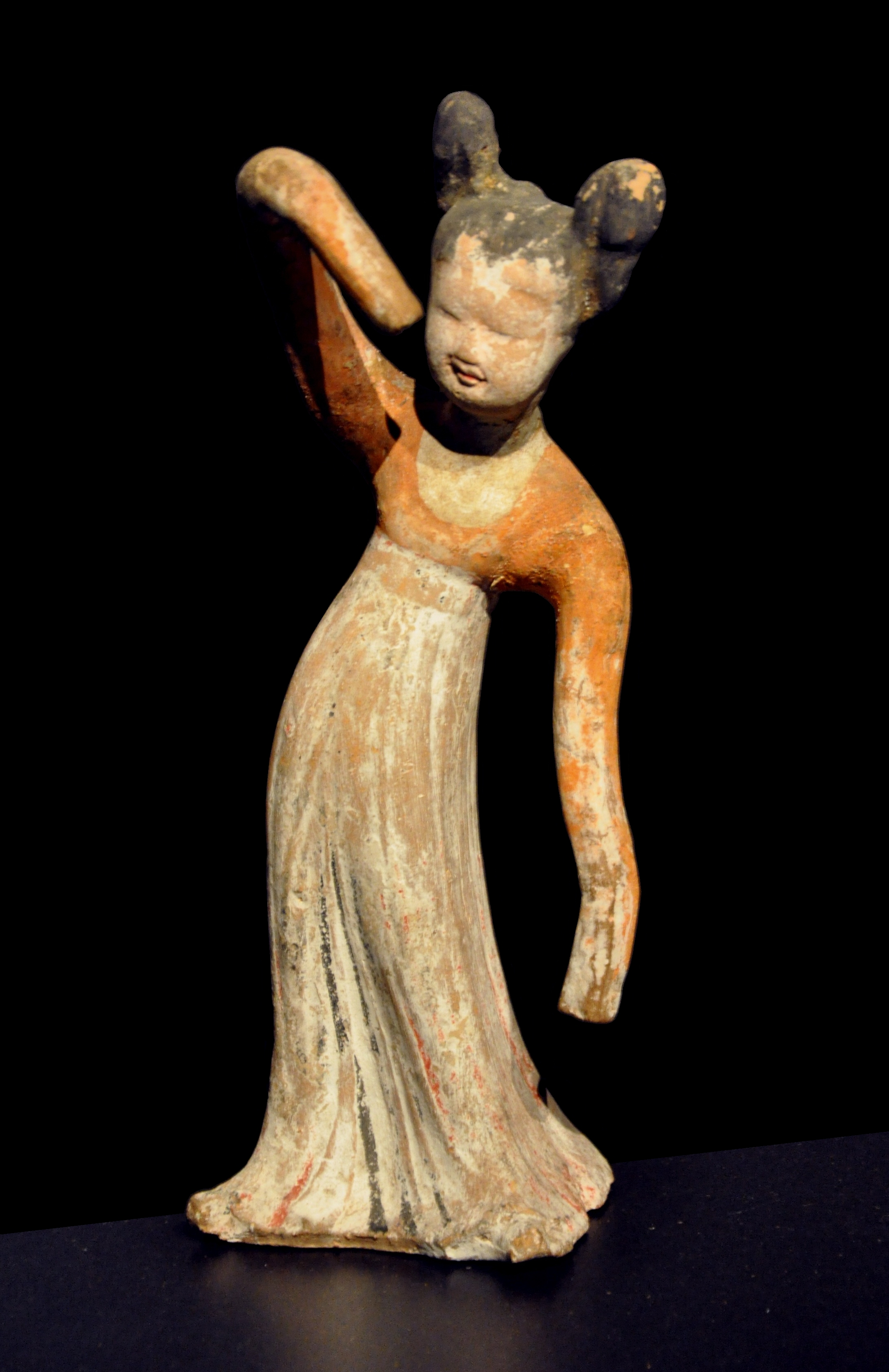
Dancing girl, the unfired paint surviving unusually well

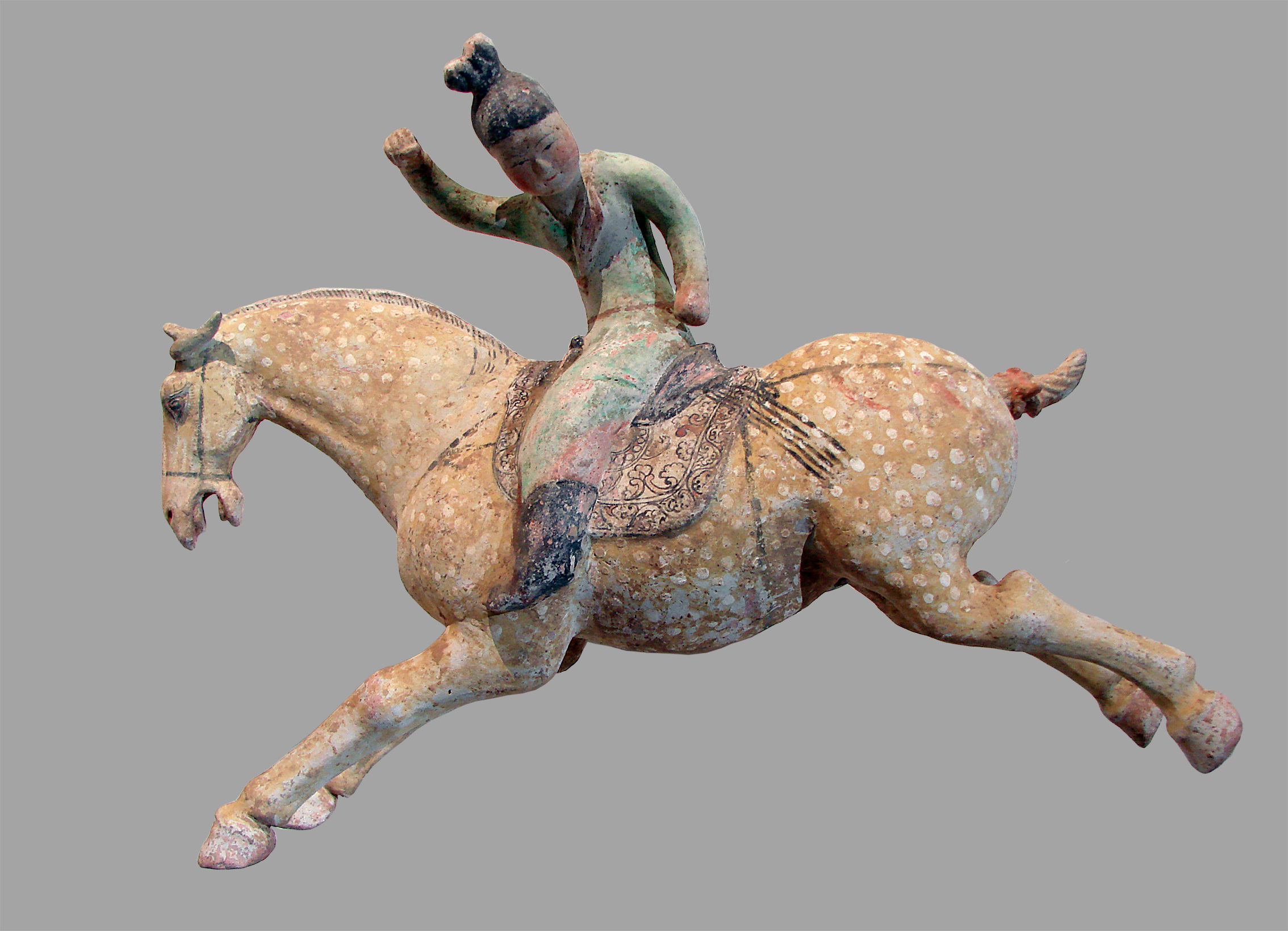
Female polo player

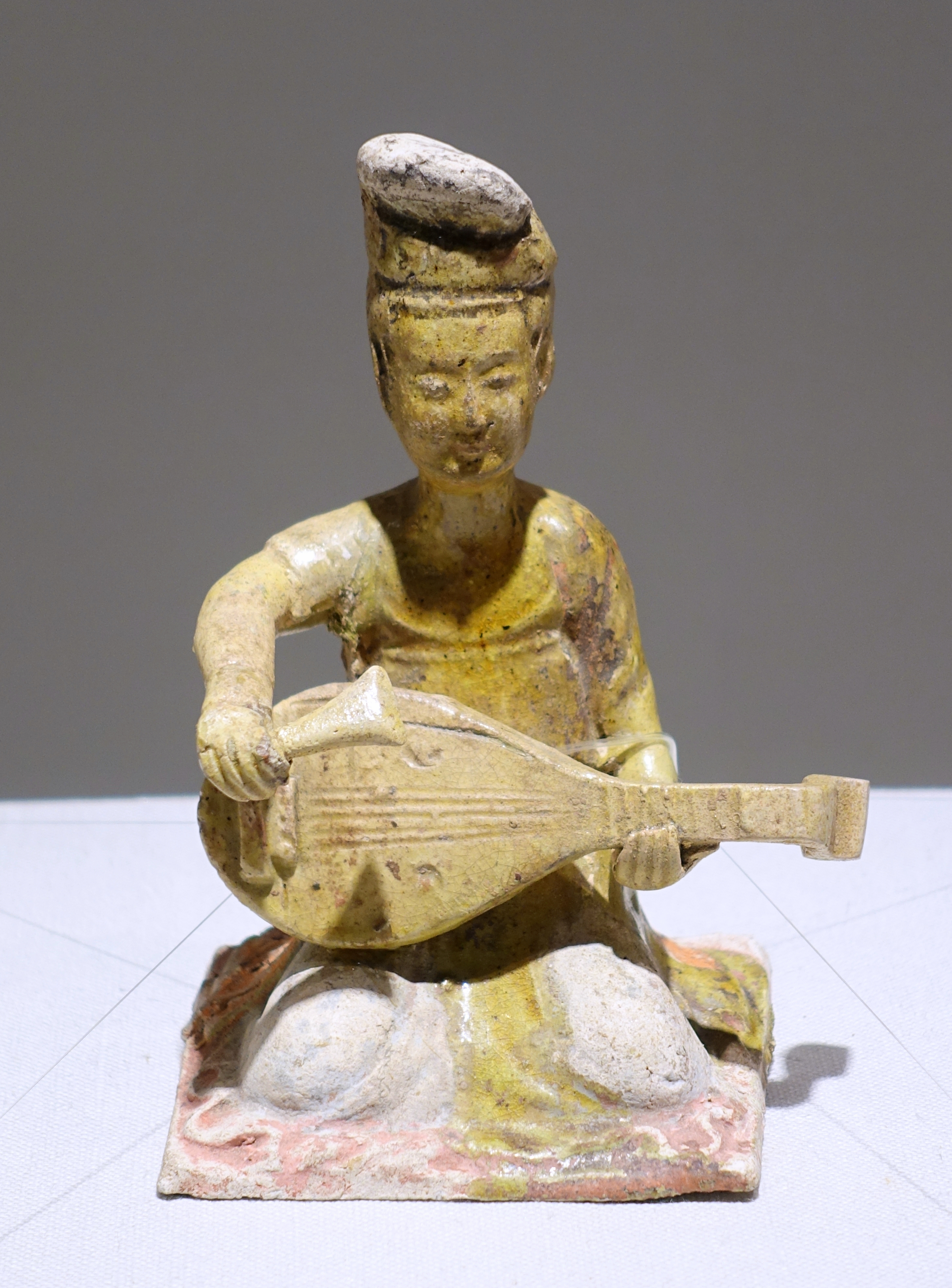
One of a group of seated female musicians

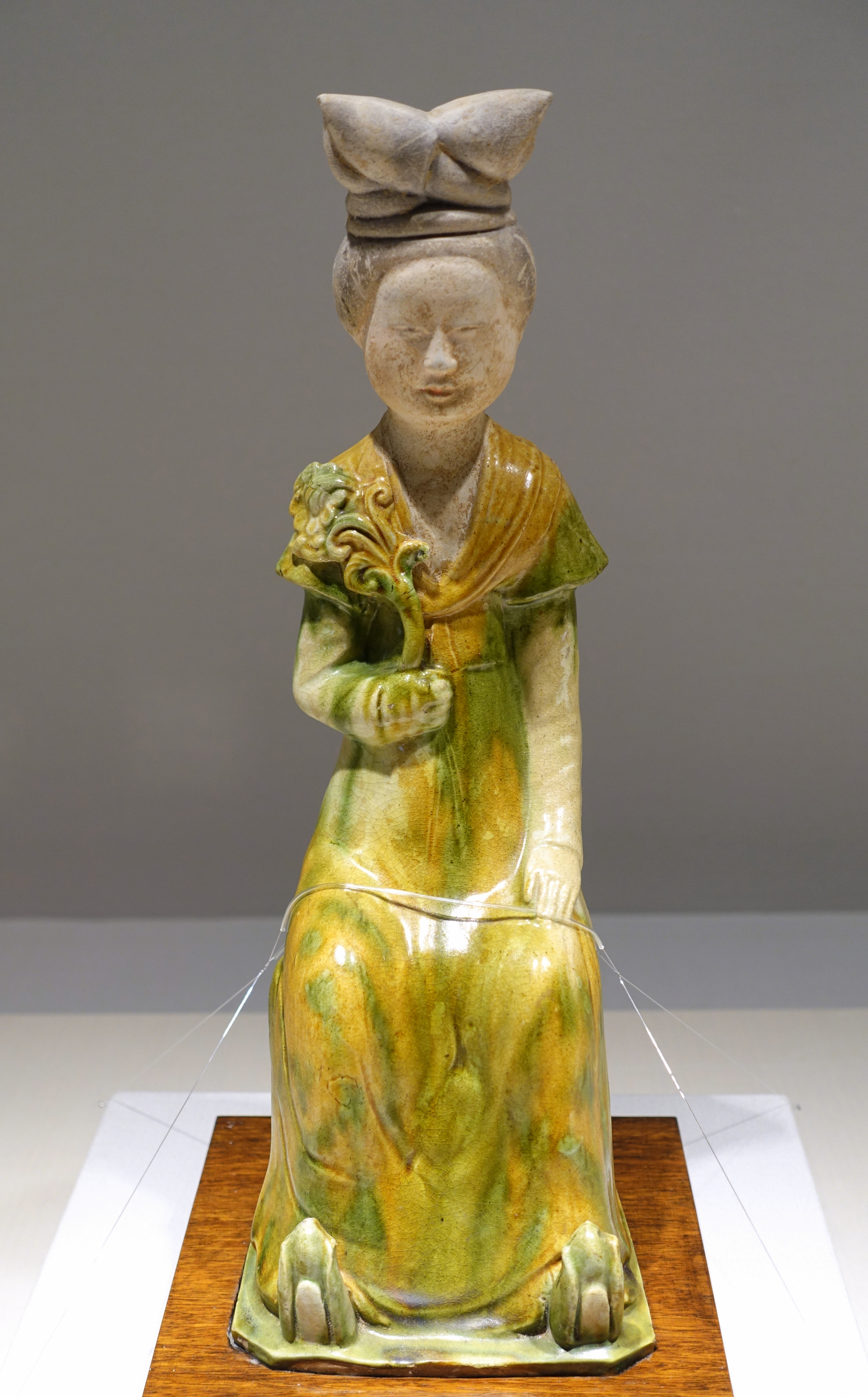
Court lady, 8th century

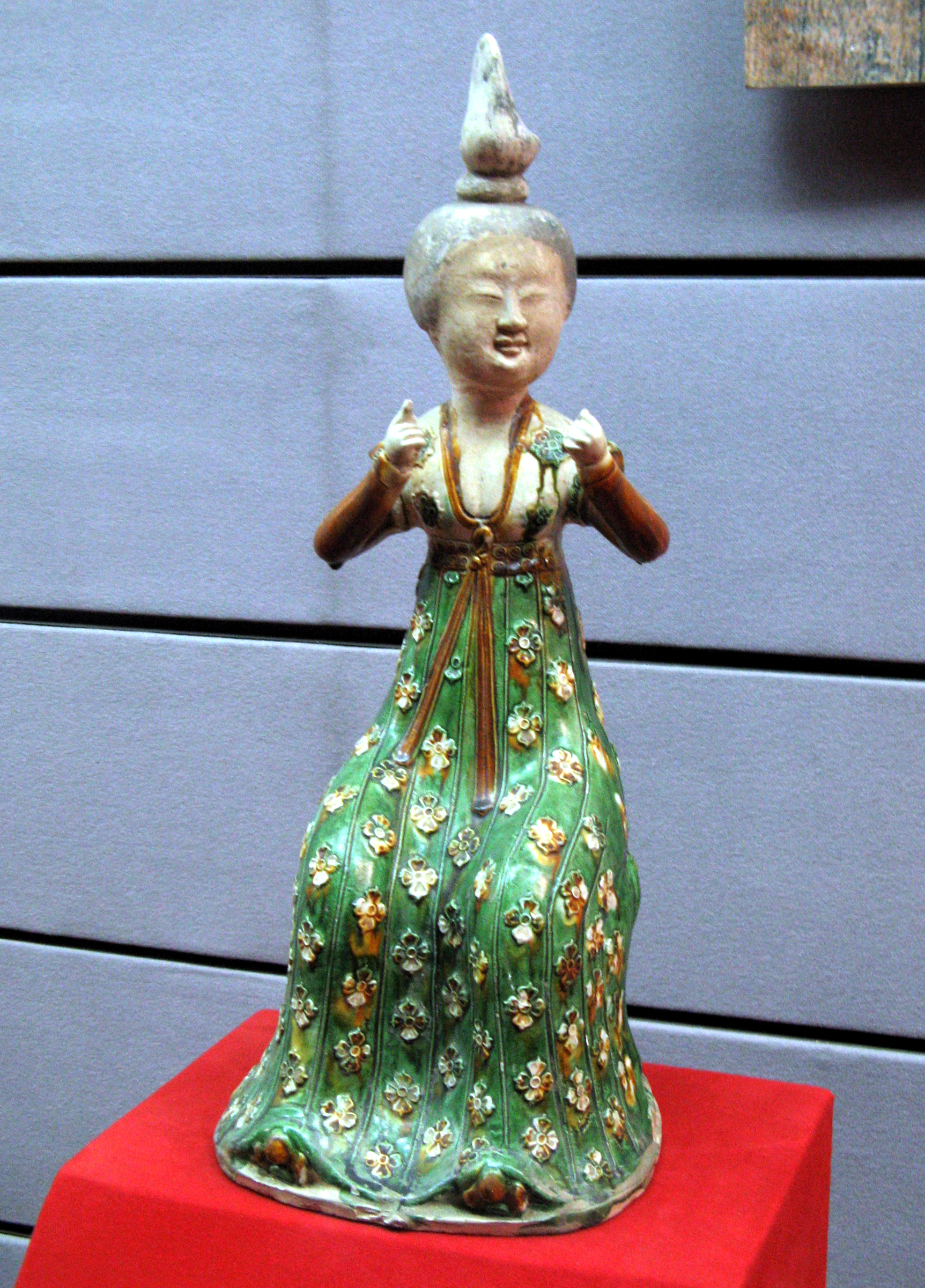
Court lady with elaborate sprigged dress

=== Men ===
Tang society, at least in Chang'an, the capital, was very cosmopolitan, and drew much of its prosperity from the Silk Road. Foreigners from further west seem to have been common as servants, in particular as grooms for horses and drivers of the camels which were the main form of transport on the overland Silk Road. Tang art liked to depict foreign figures, usually men, with standard characteristics for their faces and dress; Persian and Sogdian types can be distinguished, both with big bushy beards, and often fierce and vigorous expressions. Such figures sometimes contain clear elements of caricature.

Male figures are often given more varied and active poses, and worked in more detail than those of women, but are harder to date as the changes in women's costume were not matched in male fashion. As well as many types of servants there are military officers in armour, officials, and sometimes foreign ambassadors. The function of the officials is to present the case for the deceased to the fierce judge of the afterlife.

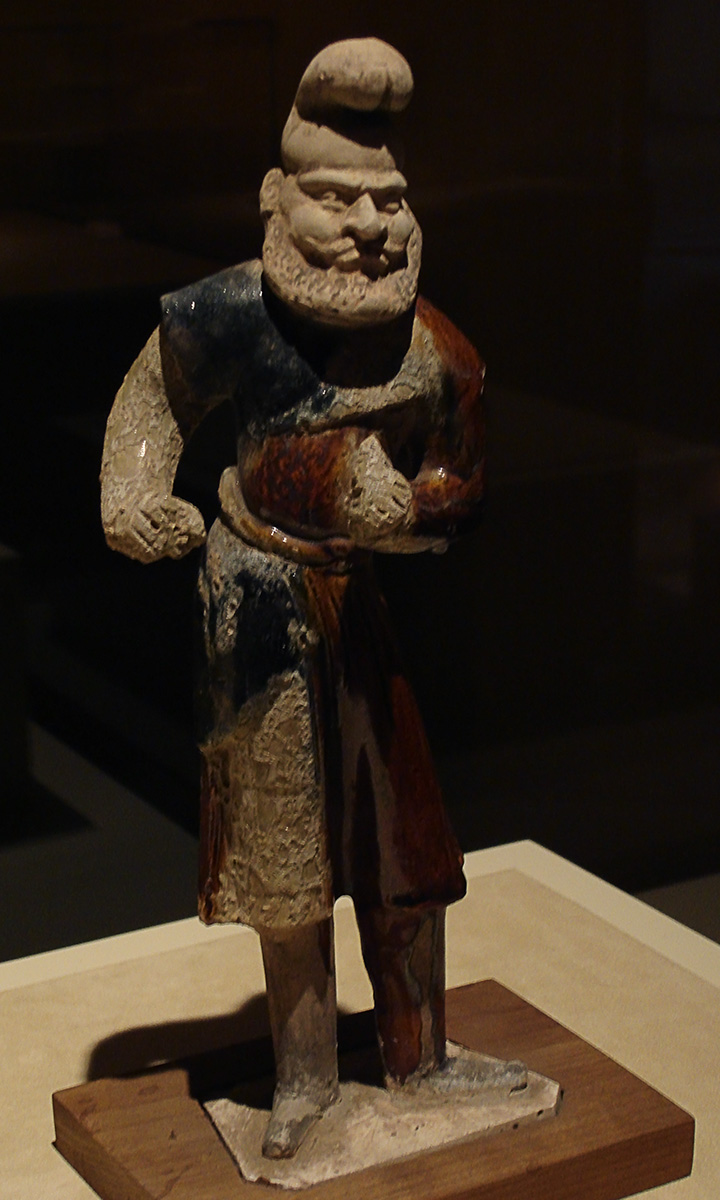
Sancai figure of a foreigner with a Persian cap

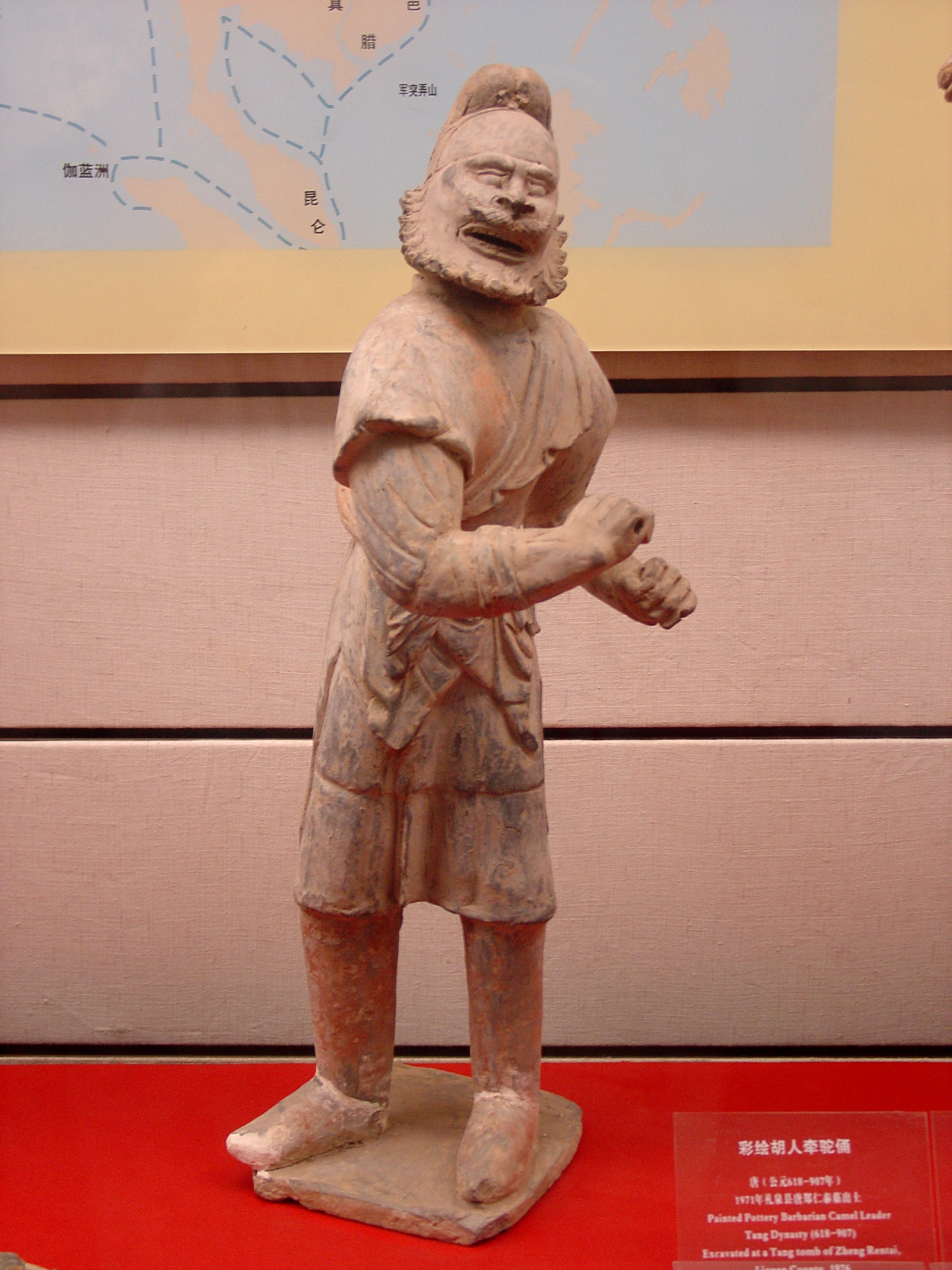
"Barbarian camel leader"

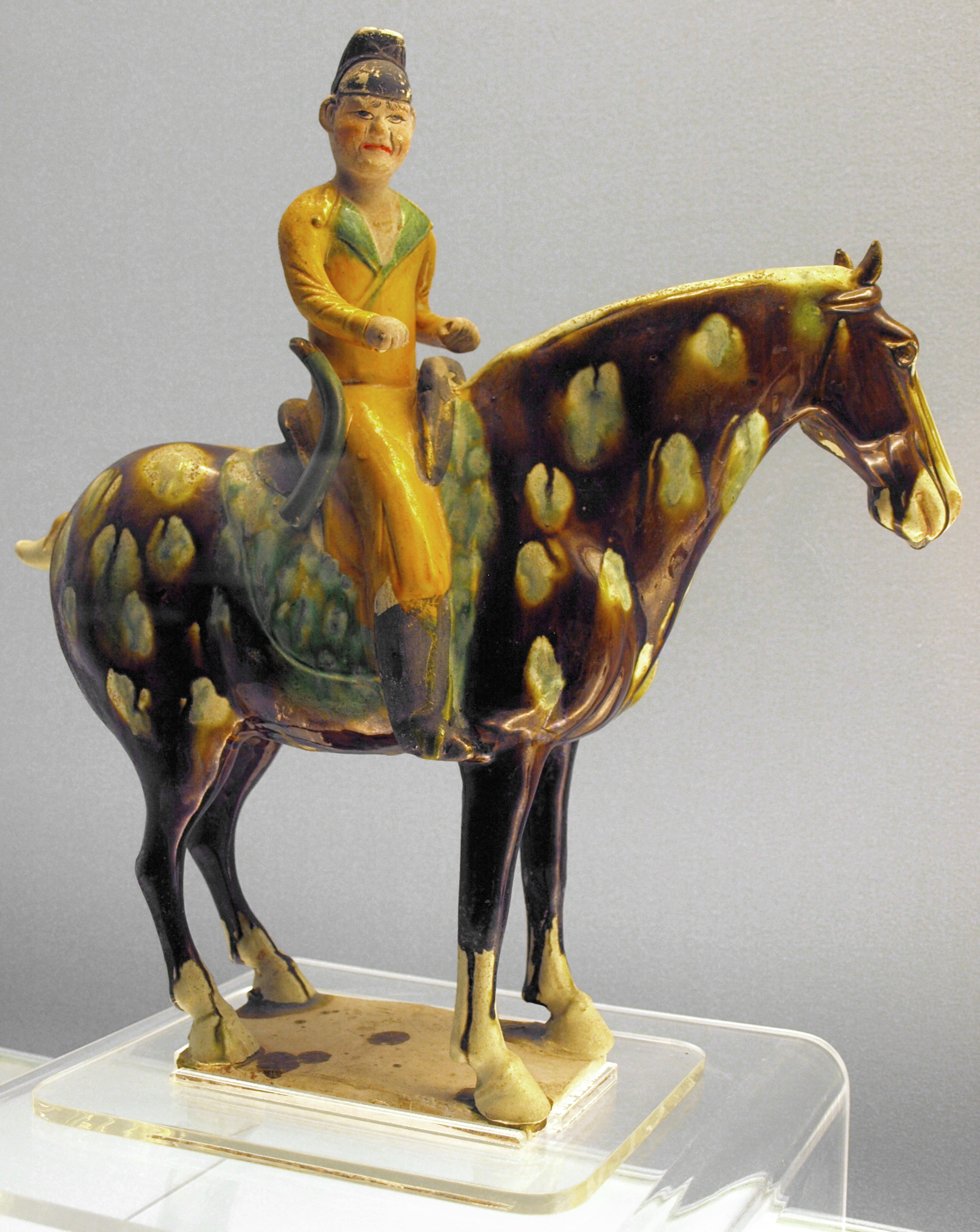
Horse with rider

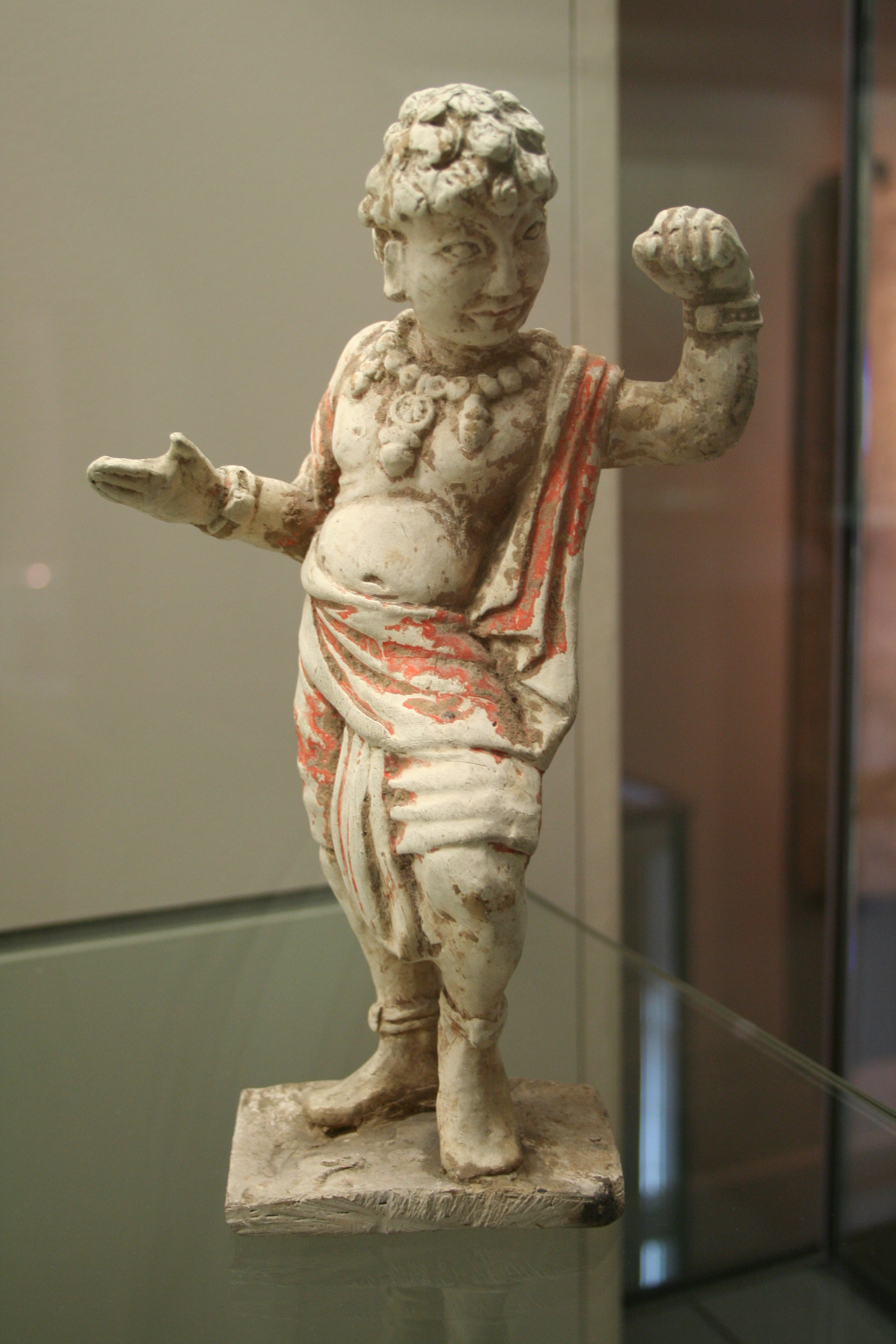
Foreign dancer

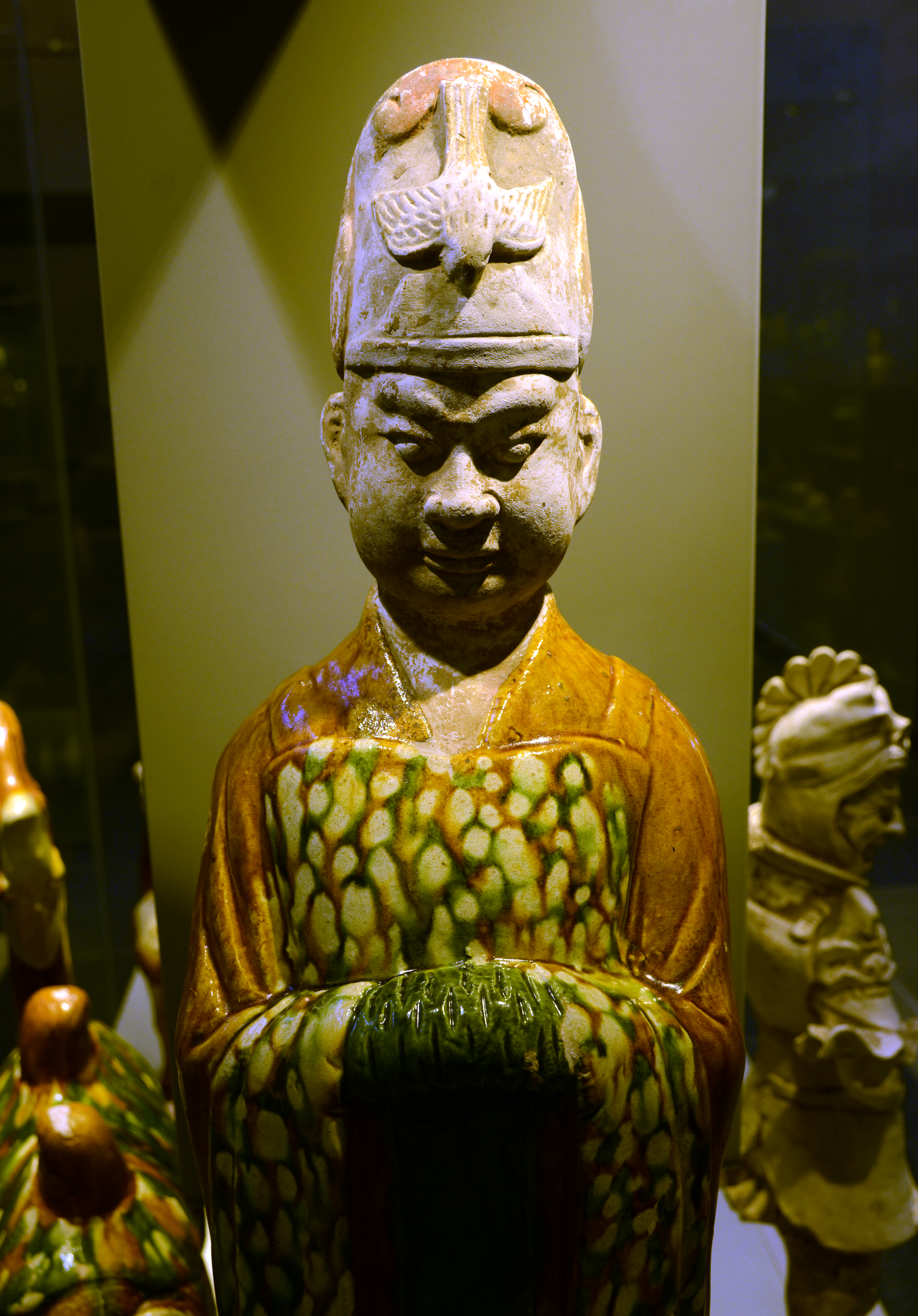
Official

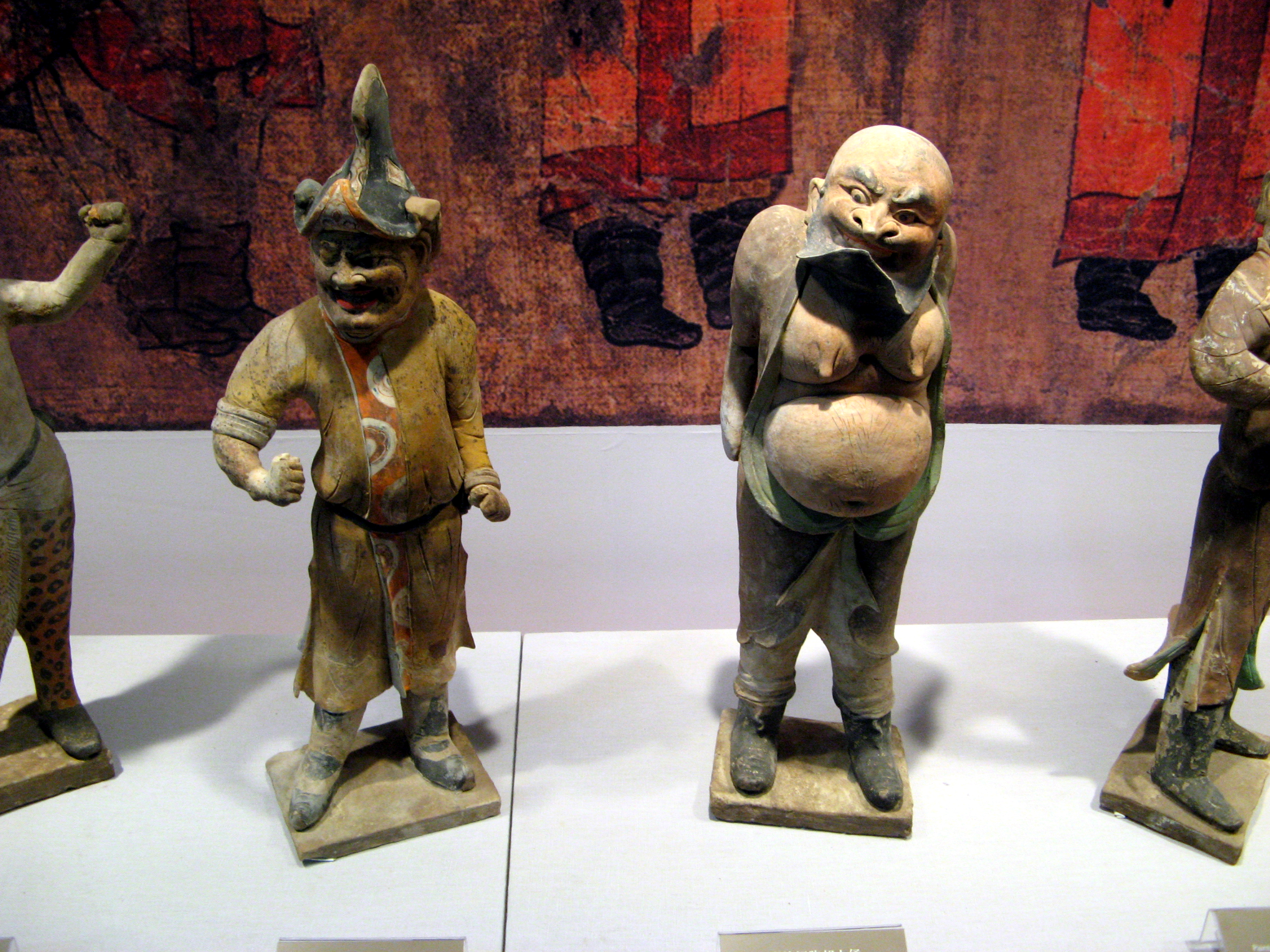
Foreigners

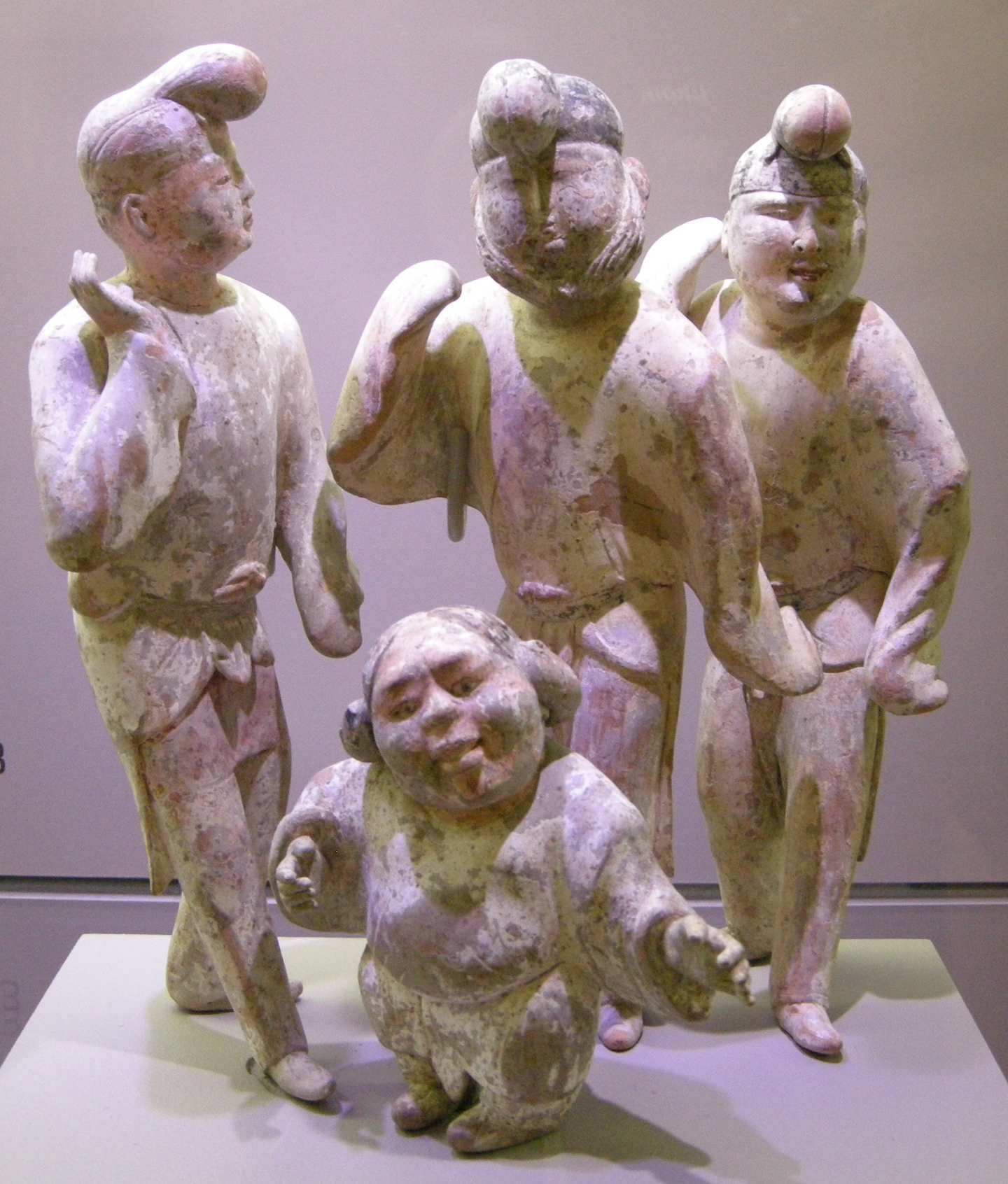
Group of actors

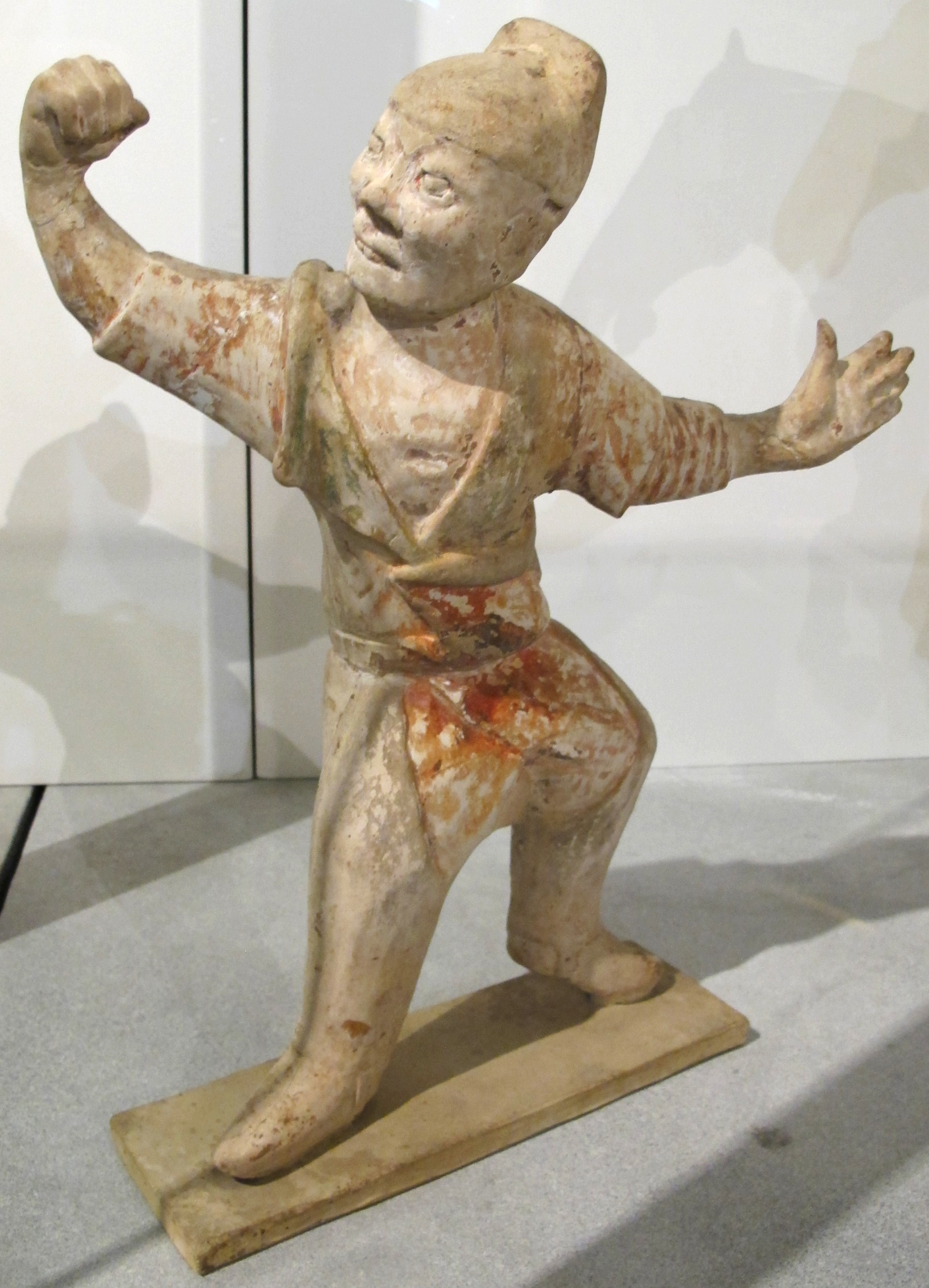
Groom controlling horse, with rope lost

=== Animals ===
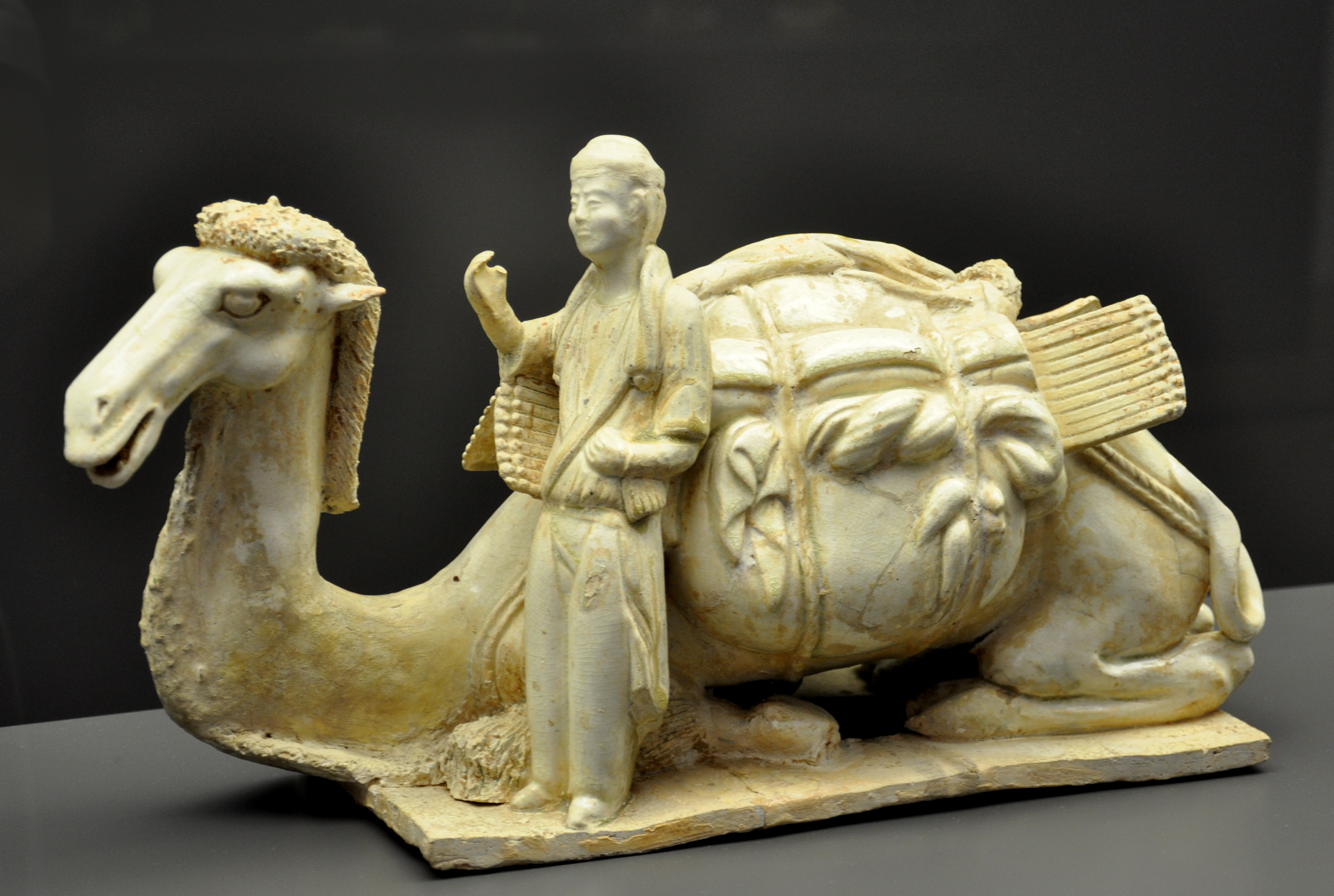
Loaded camel with rider, in this case Chinese

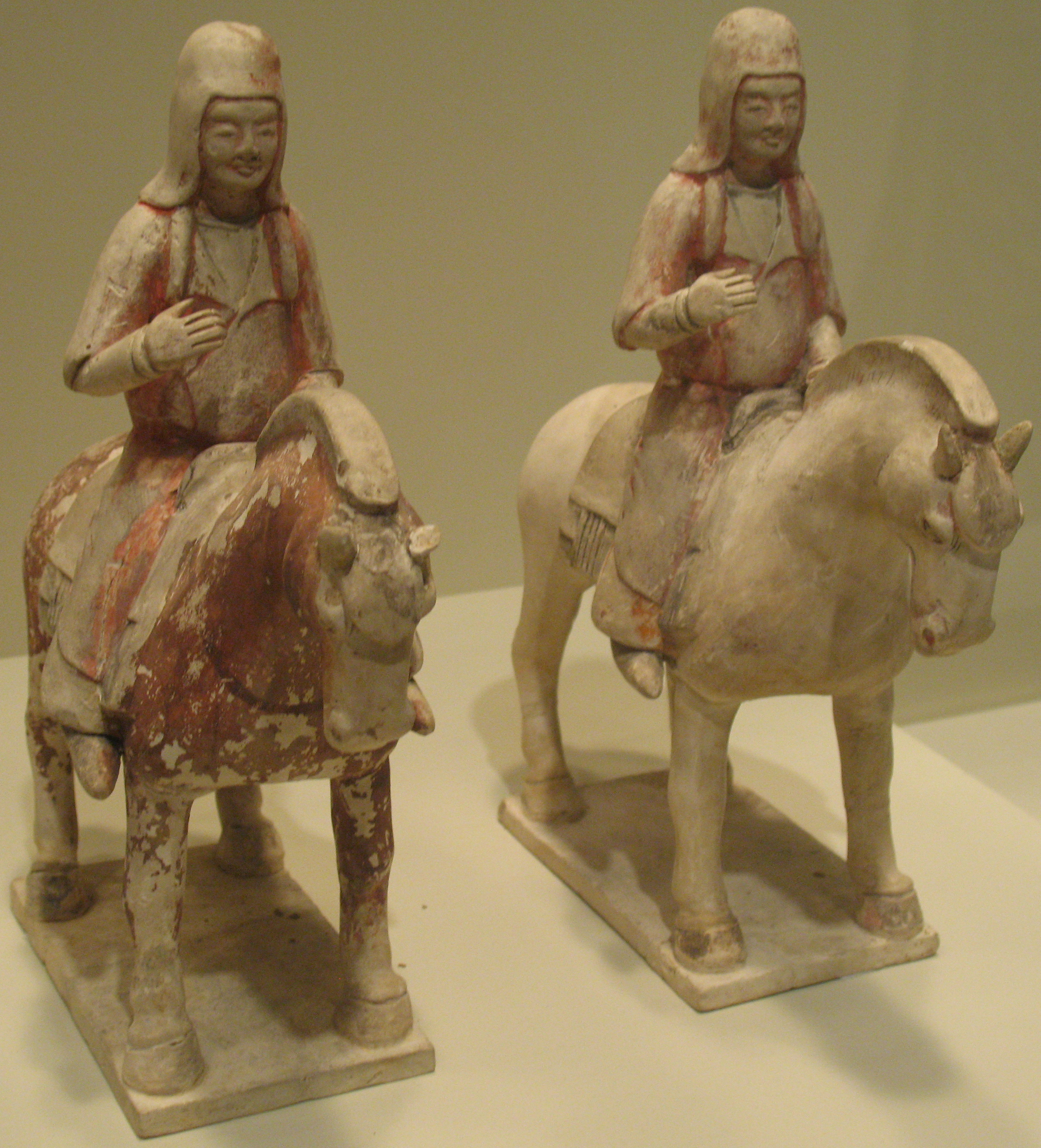
Horse riders

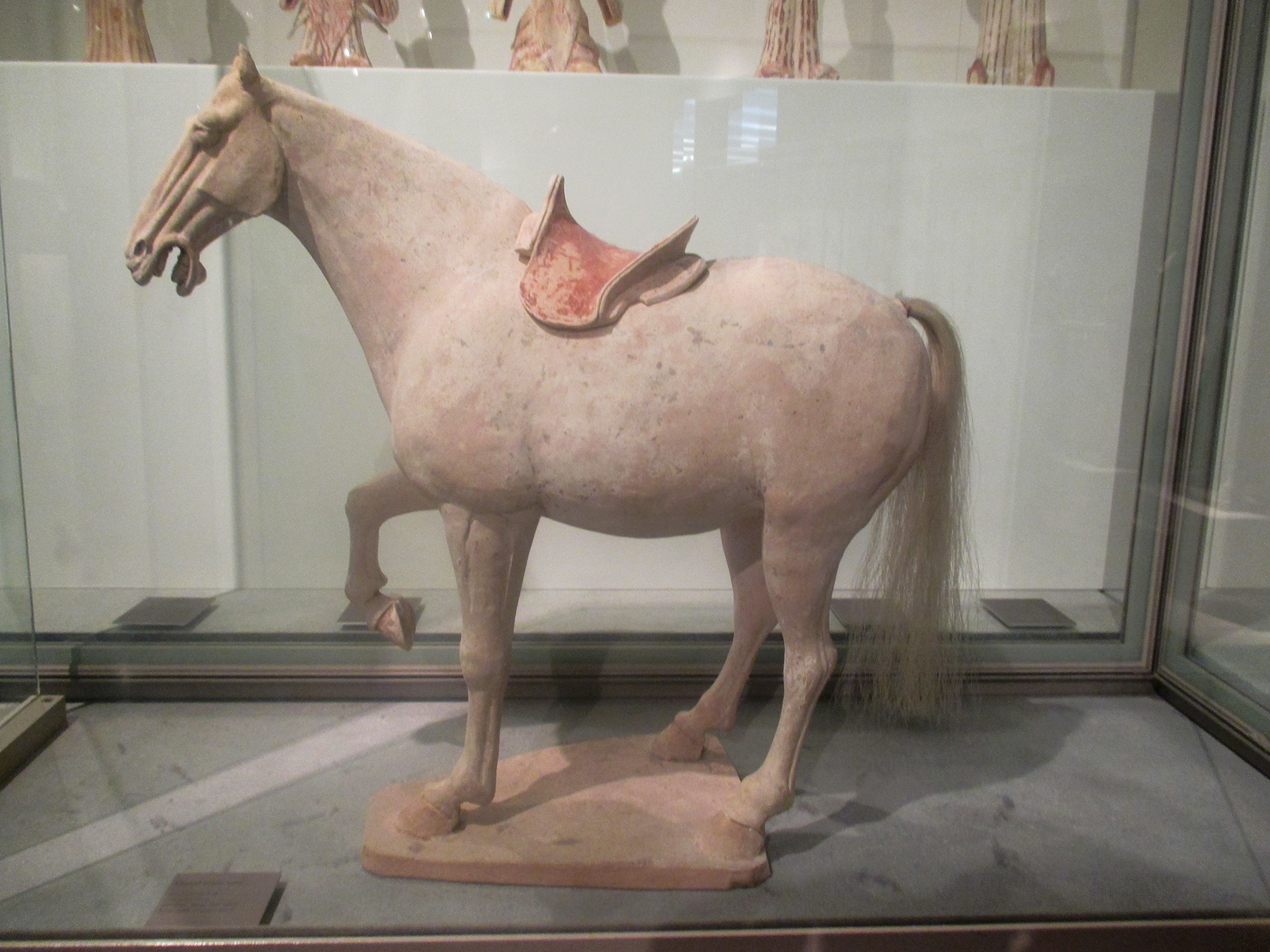
Horse and saddle

The most common animals, and the most likely to be large and carefully modelled and decorated, are horses and camels. Both sorts range from animals without harness and saddlery to those with elaborately detailed trappings, and carrying riders or, in the case of camels, heavy loads of goods. At least two famous camels carry a small human orchestra. Dogs and farm animals, apart from some bulls at up to about 30 cm (12 in) high, are more likely to be small and unglazed.

Along with guardian figures and officials, statues of horses are the main type of tomb figure that is also known in other media, such as gilt-bronze or stone, and some rich tombs also contain such figures in metal. The camels may sometimes belong to tombs of people rich from trade, but also seem to have been associated with wealth generally. They are often shown with heads raised and their mouths open, and in the finest models the shaggy areas at the neck and top of the legs are carefully textured in the clay. The horses are the "heavenly horses" from Ferghana in the west, which under the Tang dynasty were more common in China and ceased to be a highly prized rarity. These were also made in pottery under the Han dynasty; the Tang examples are more realistic, if perhaps less expressive.

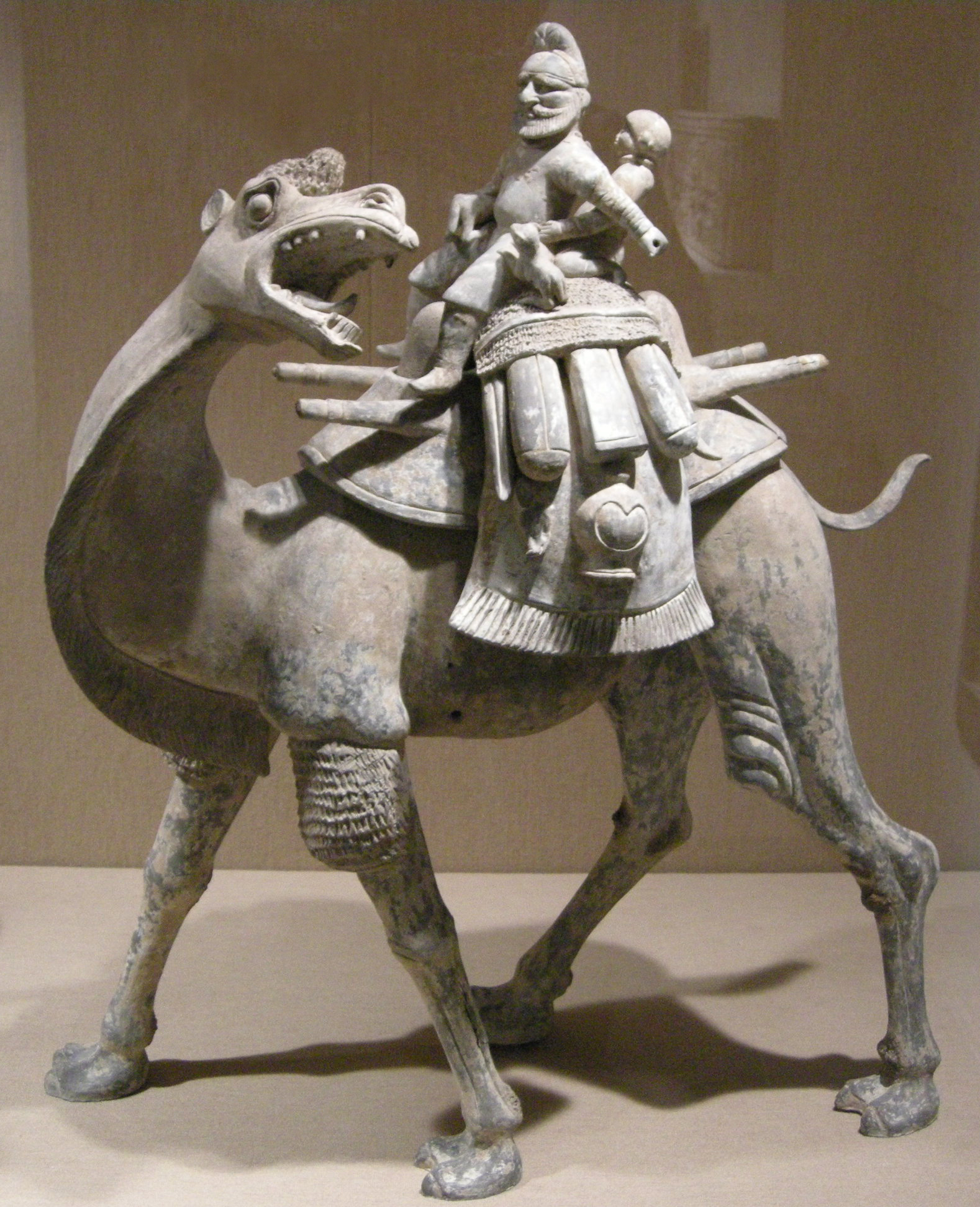
Unglazed camel and Sogdian rider

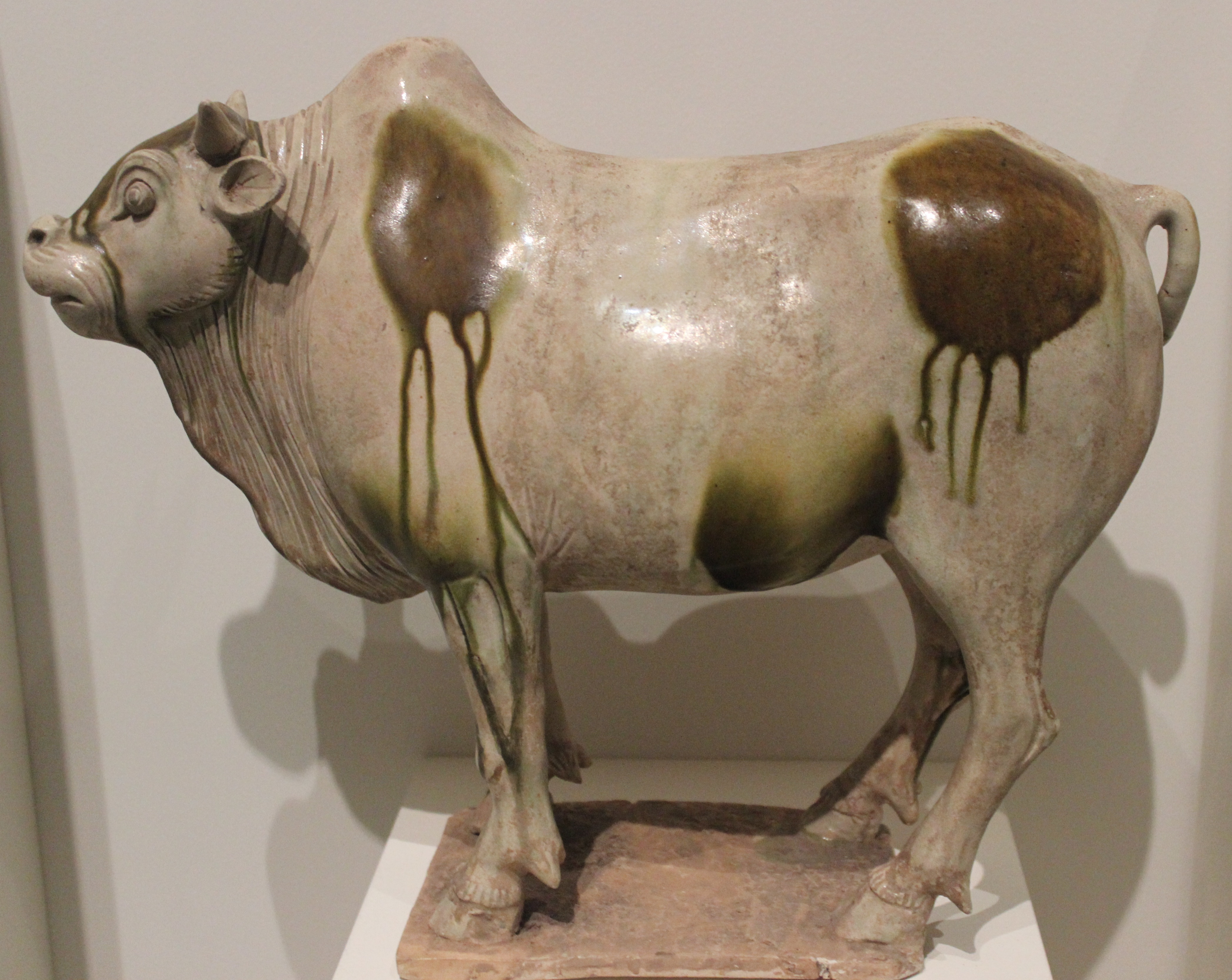
Glazed bull

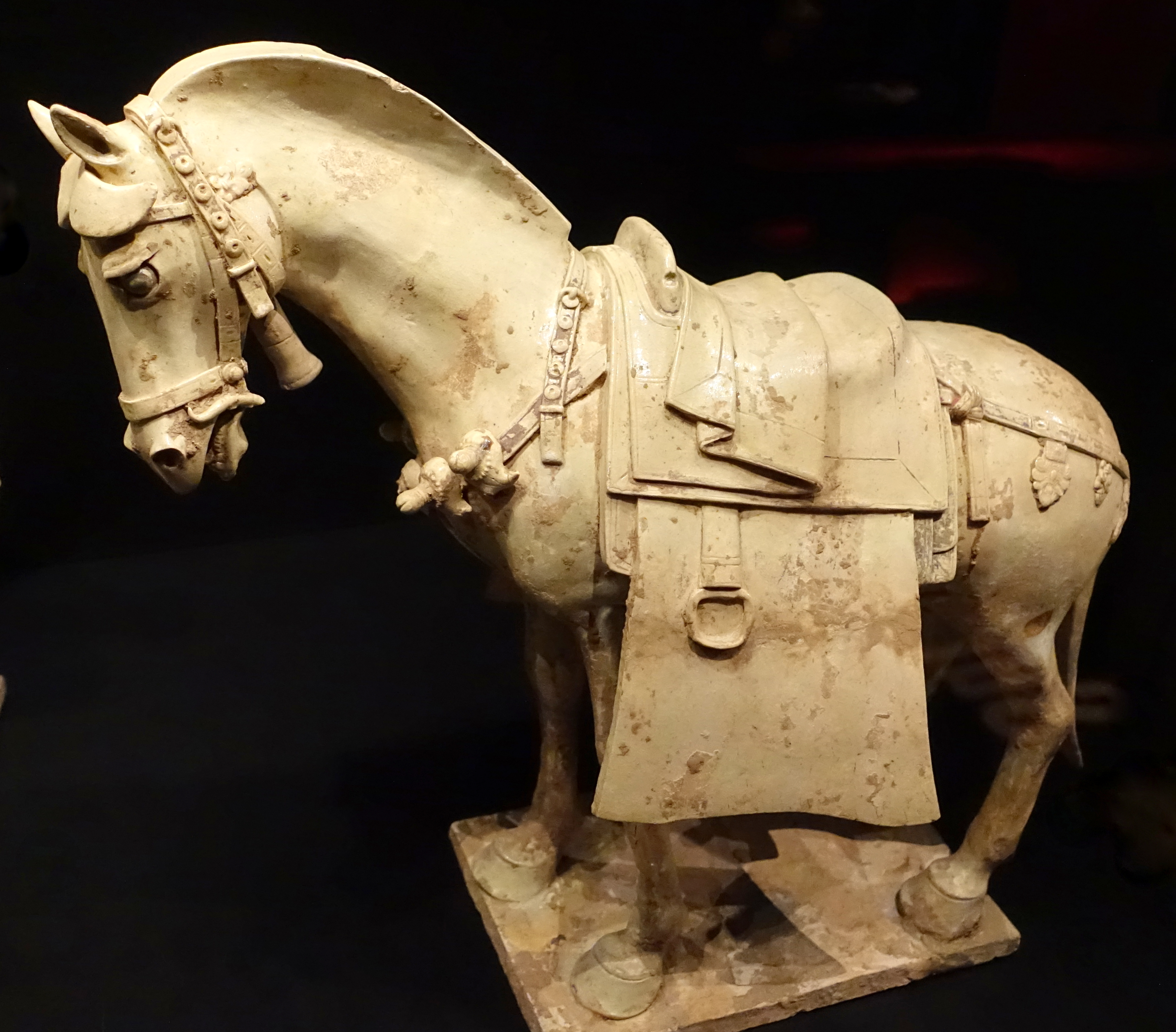
Horse with elaborate trappings, early 600s

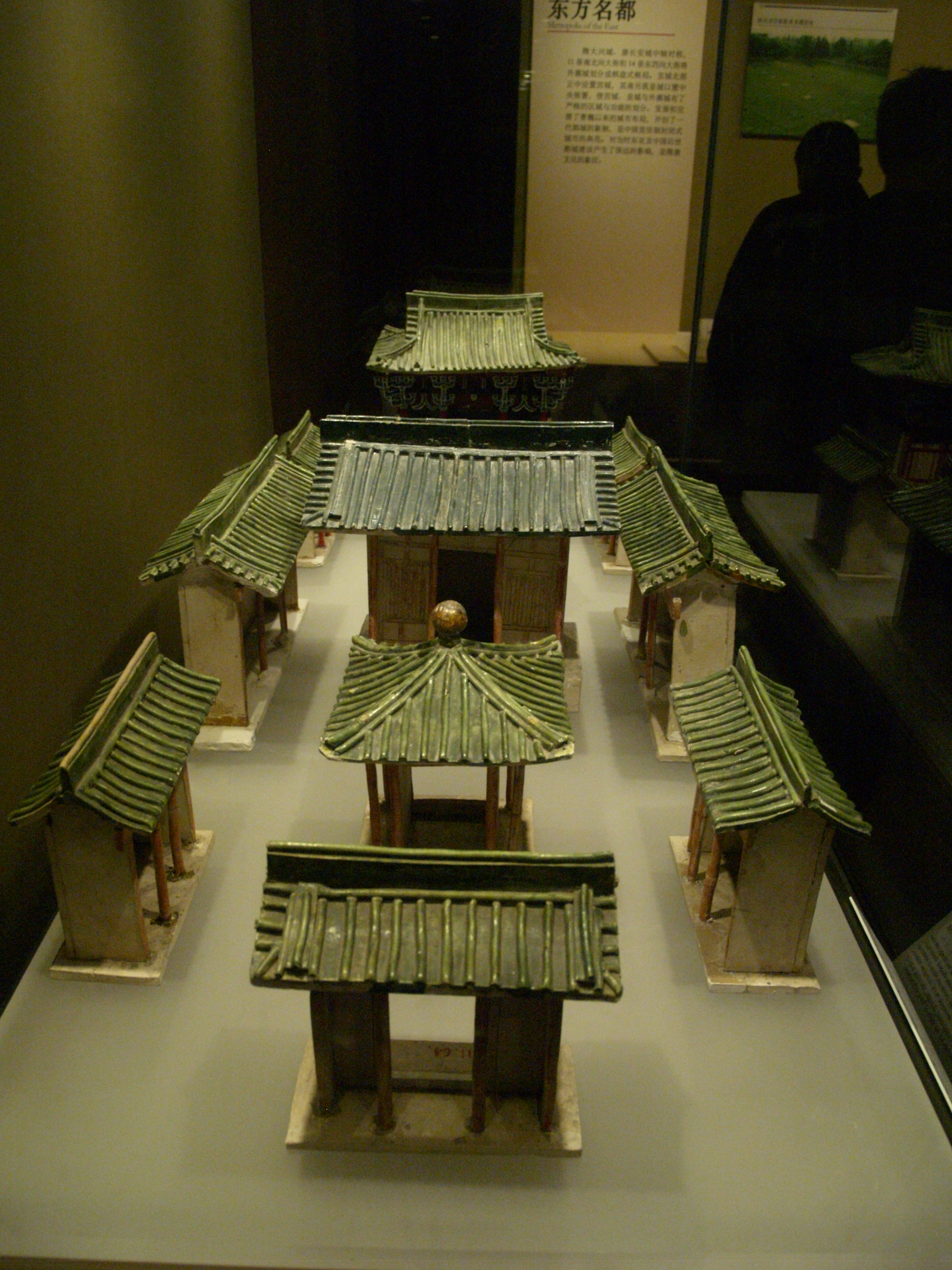
Model of a house set around a courtyard

=== Tomb guardians ===
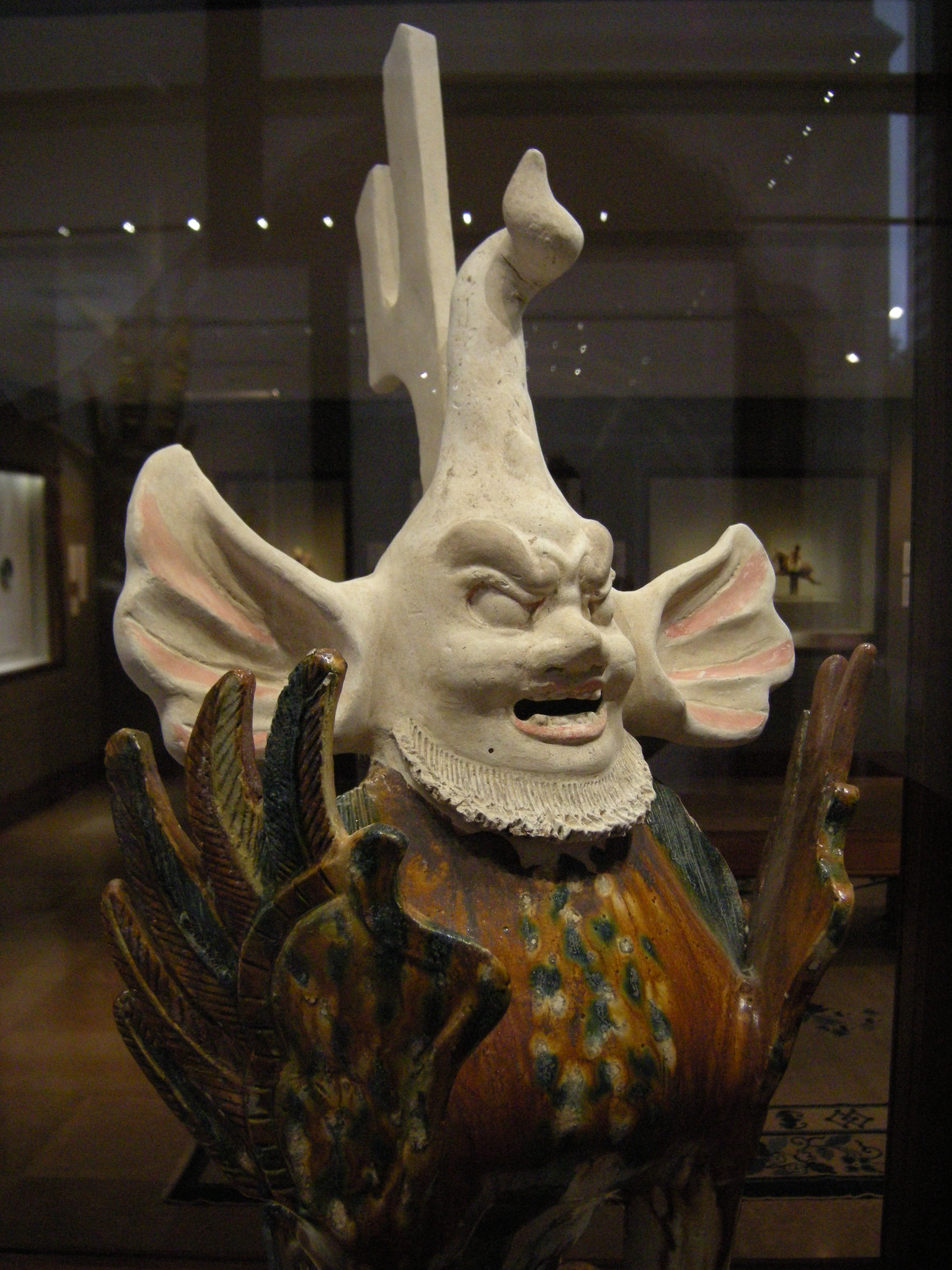
Unglazed face of an earth spirit of the semi-human type

Four tomb guardians were standard in rich tombs, typically one at each corner: a pair each of "earth spirits" or zhenmushou, and the lokapala or zhenmuyong warrior guardians. The figures are typically the largest and most elaborate in a tomb, and must often have been much the most difficult to model and fire. They are more likely to be glazed in sancai, although many very elaborately made examples are not.

The figures may have been believed to protect the living by keeping the spirits of the dead from inappropriately roaming the world outside the tomb, as well as protecting the tomb from intrusions by robbers or spirits; the earth spirits were apparently associated with the first role, and the lokapala with the second.

The lokapala was also found above ground in Buddhist temples, in stone or wood. They seem to represent a merger of traditional Daoist guardians, dating back to the Han dynasty, and the Buddhist dvarapala or "Heavenly Kings", of which there were in theory four, though often only two were depicted in other Buddhist cultures. These too were shown as "a fabulous crested semi-human being with bulging eyes, furiously gaping mouth and massive powerful arms and legs". Whereas the Indian versions emphasized royal attributes, in China they were "transformed into dynamic idealized generals", with elaborate armour, often with added sprigged reliefs.

In the early part of the Tang their pose was less dramatic, standing with straight legs and holding a weapon (now usually lost) at rest. In the 8th century the elaborarate contrapposto poses were developed, typically with one foot higher than the other, as it rests on an animal or dwarfish conquered demon, and one arm held high, brandishing a weapon, while the other is bent and rests on the hip, in a pose combining fierceness and nonchalance.

The earth spirits are still more fantastic, with animal bodies, often including wings sprouting from the tops of the forelegs. The heads are often different, with one semi-human and another perhaps based on a snarling lion. Both have "horns and crests like flames or huge cockscombs", typically even larger in the lion-like type, while the semi-human type may have huge wide ears. Often the faces of the lion type are glazed, and the semi-human type not. Although mentioned in literature from the Han onwards, they only appear in art from the 6th century onwards, apparently developing from masks worn in the "devil-clearing ceremony at the New Year.

There were also more conventional figures of snarling lions, relatively small and usually in 'sancai glaze. Like the sets of zodiac figures, these continued after the Tang, which the elaborate "earth spirits" and lokapala did not.

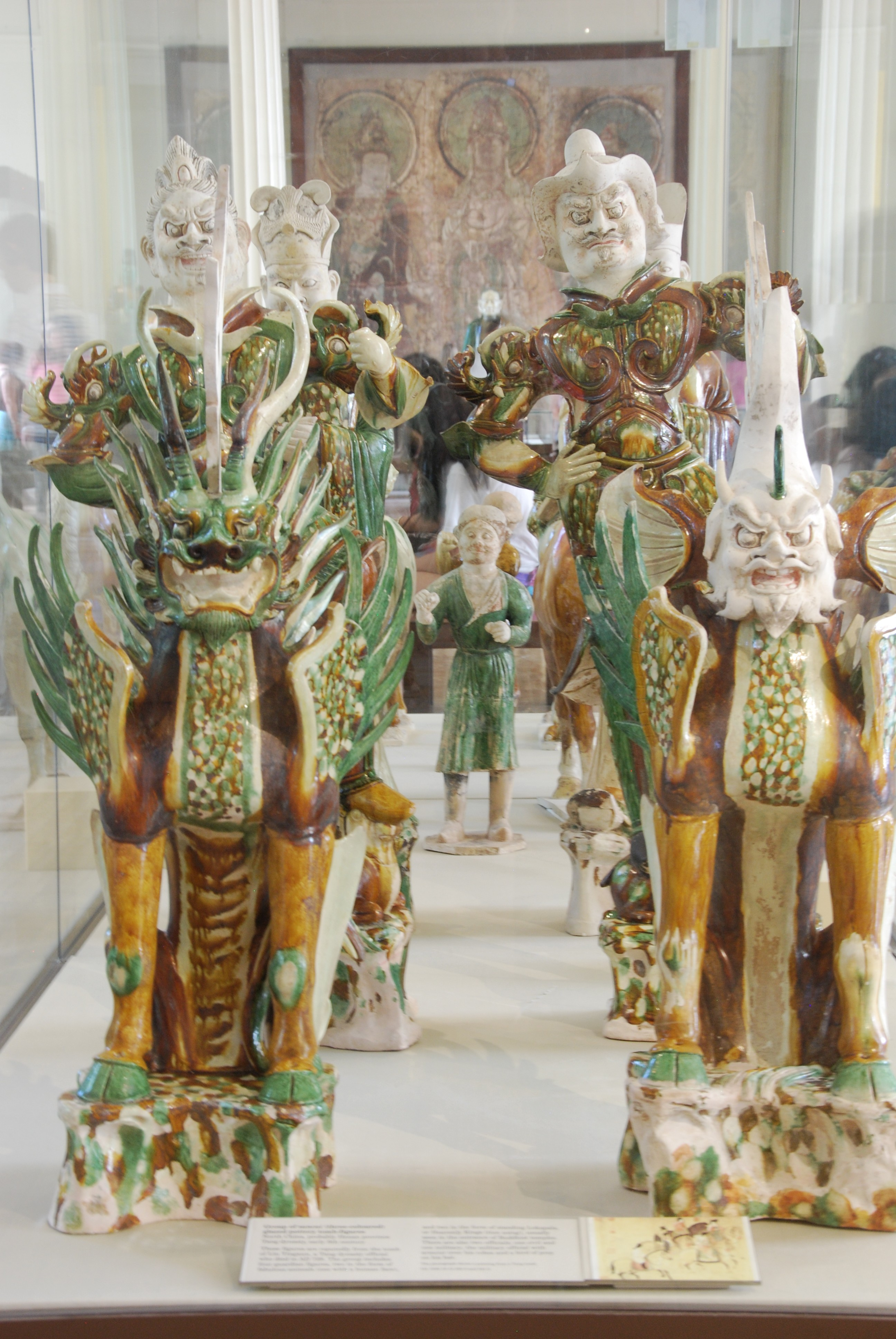
Tang dynasty tomb figures of Liu Tingxun: Two earth spirits in front, two lokapala behind

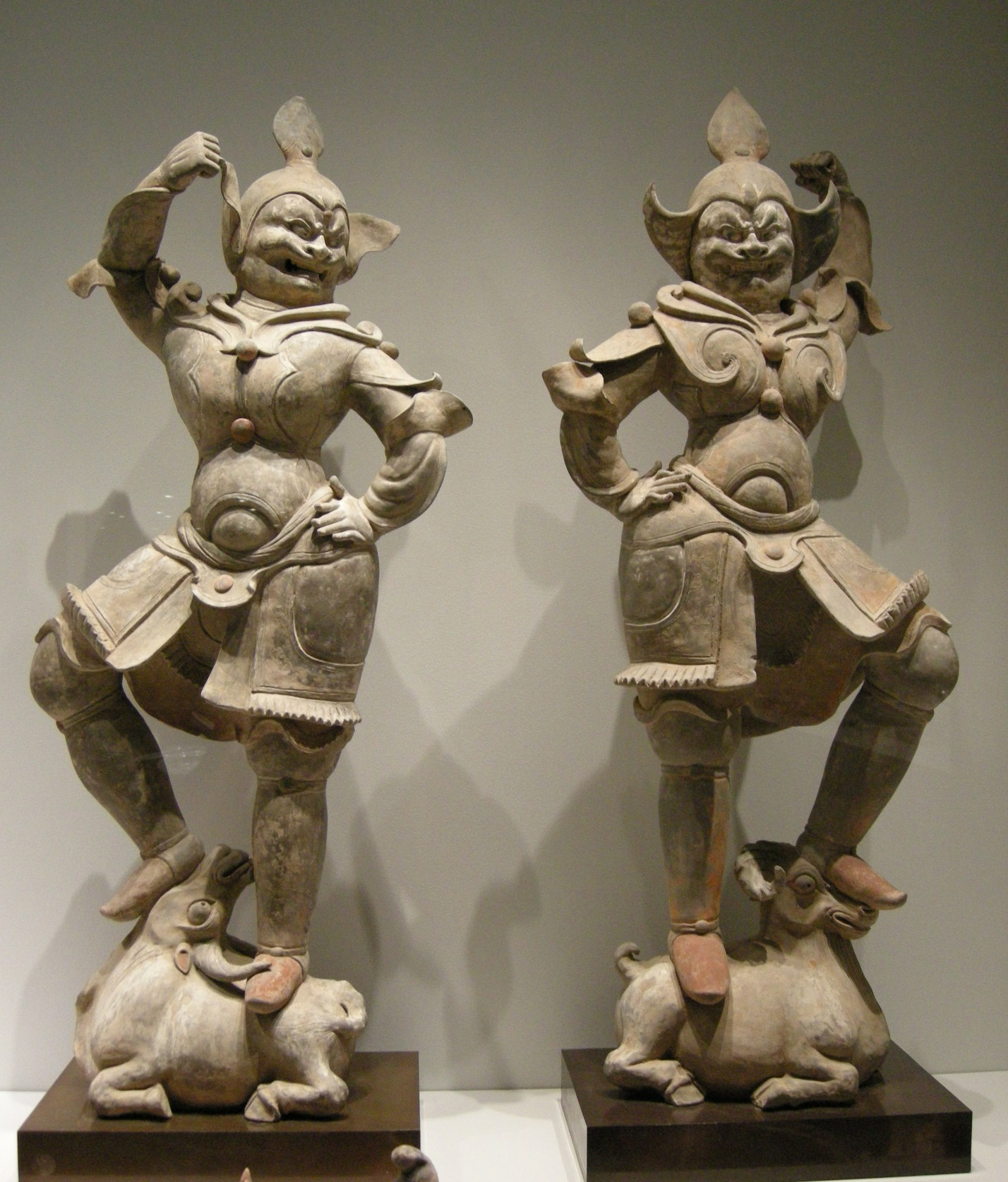
Pair of unglazed lokapala

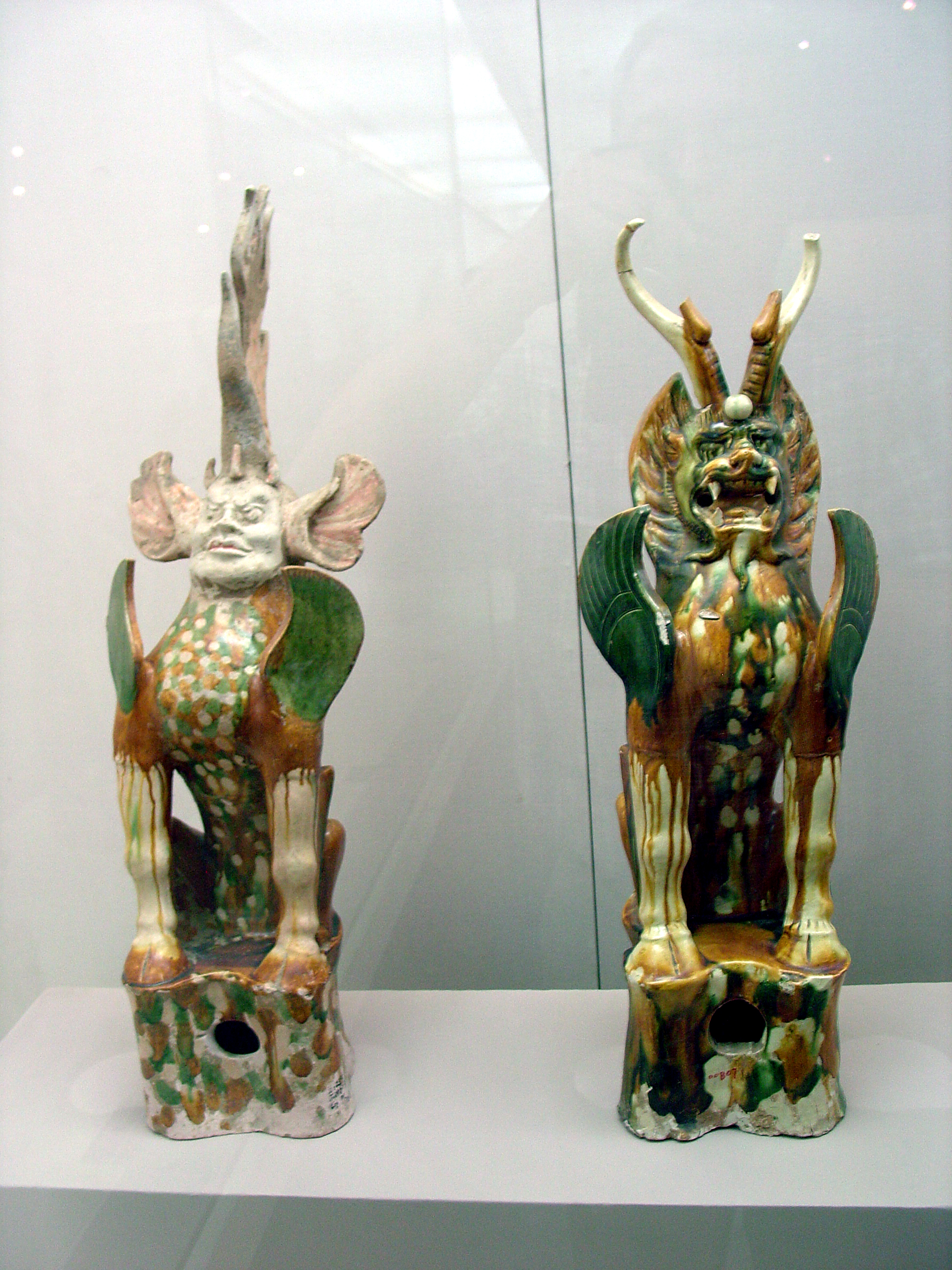
Pair of earth spirits

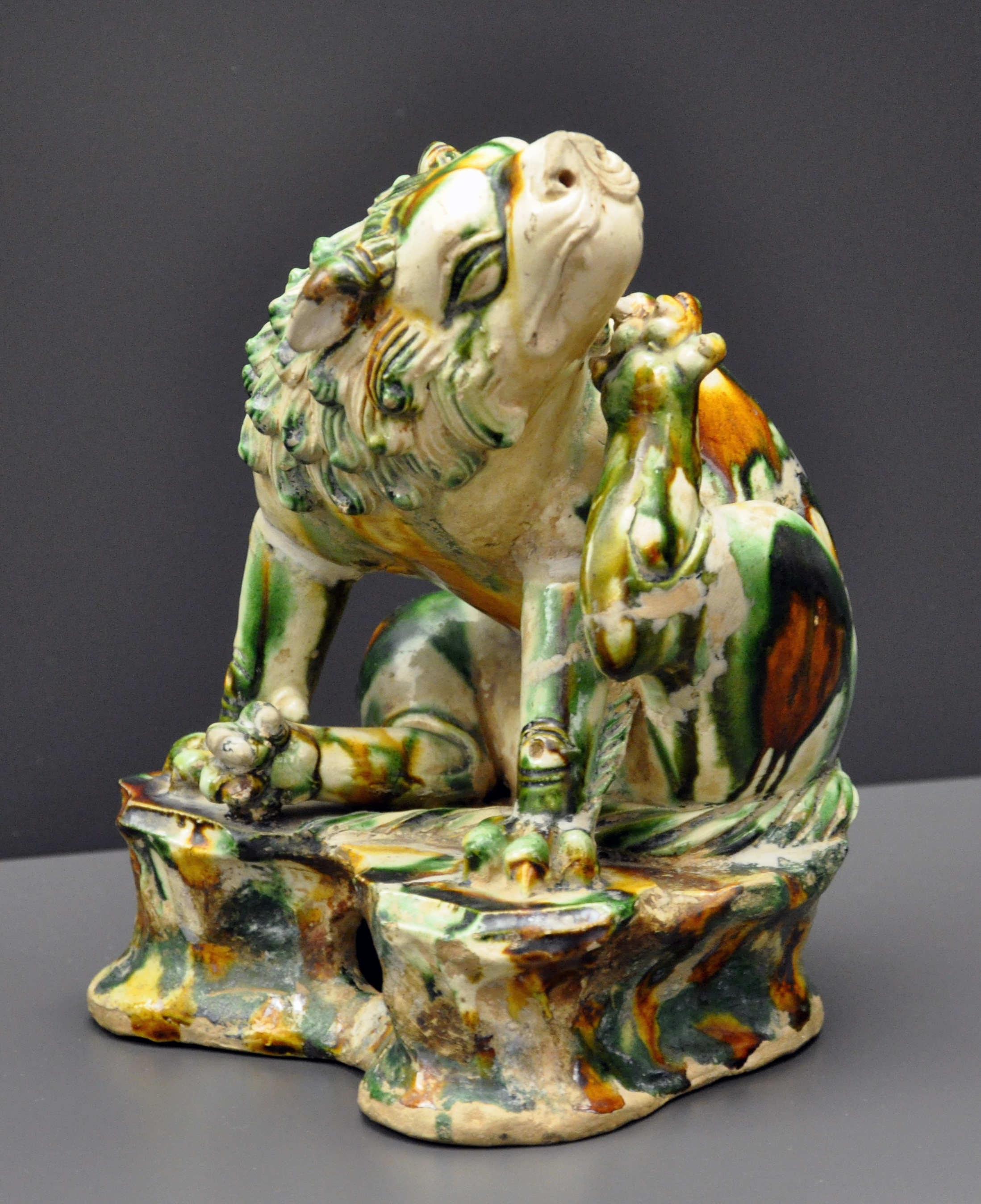
Lion figure

== Collecting history ==
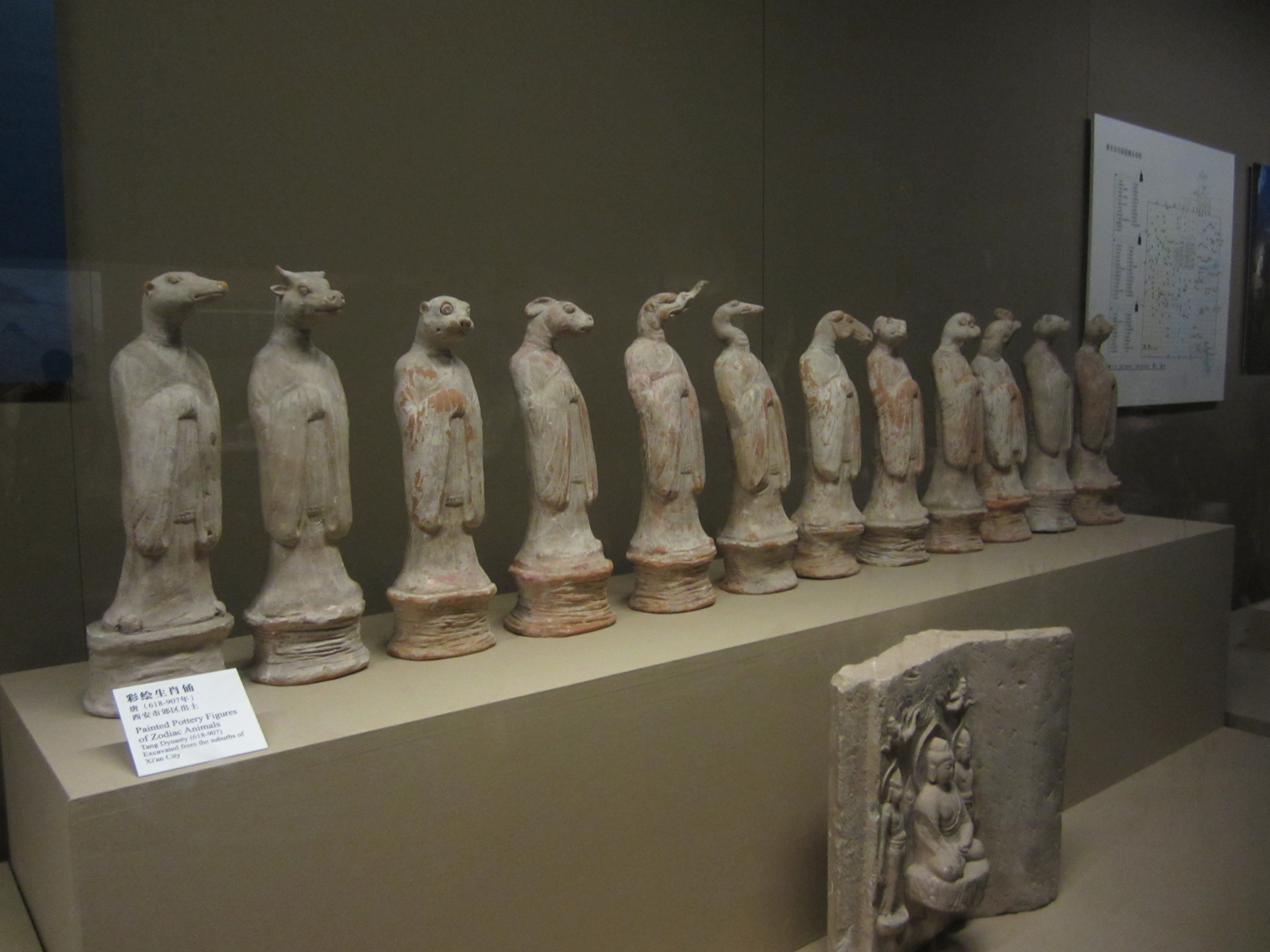
A set of Chinese Zodiac figures

Tang figures were not of much interest to traditional Chinese connoisseurs of pottery, and are still relatively little collected by Chinese collectors because they are made specifically for use in burials, and so considered unlucky; however they are popular exhibits in Chinese museums. They became extremely popular with Western collectors from about the 1910s, especially figures of horses, partly because they harmonized well with modern Western art and decor. By 1963, Gerald Reitlinger could write that "no Mayfair flat is complete without a T'ang camel". Prices, which peaked at a top level of about £600 a figure in the early 1920s, fell in the 1930s and 1940s, but rose sharply in the 1960s, with a record auction price in 1969 of £16,000 for a horse.

From about the late 1990s it was realized that there were large numbers of fakes on the market, and there was also an upsurge in new discoveries as construction in China boomed, and the market was hit by increased supply coinciding with a falling from fashion. For all these reasons, the figures have not shared in the huge increase in Chinese art prices since the 1990s, which has been driven by Chinese collectors. The record price for a horse remains £3,740,000, from a sale by the British Rail Pension Fund at Sotheby's in 1989. In 2002 the dealer who had sold this piece to the pension fund in the 1970s said that he thought that in 2002 it would be "lucky" to reach a price of £1 million.

== See also ==
- Tang Standing Horse figure, Canberra
