= Shujishi =

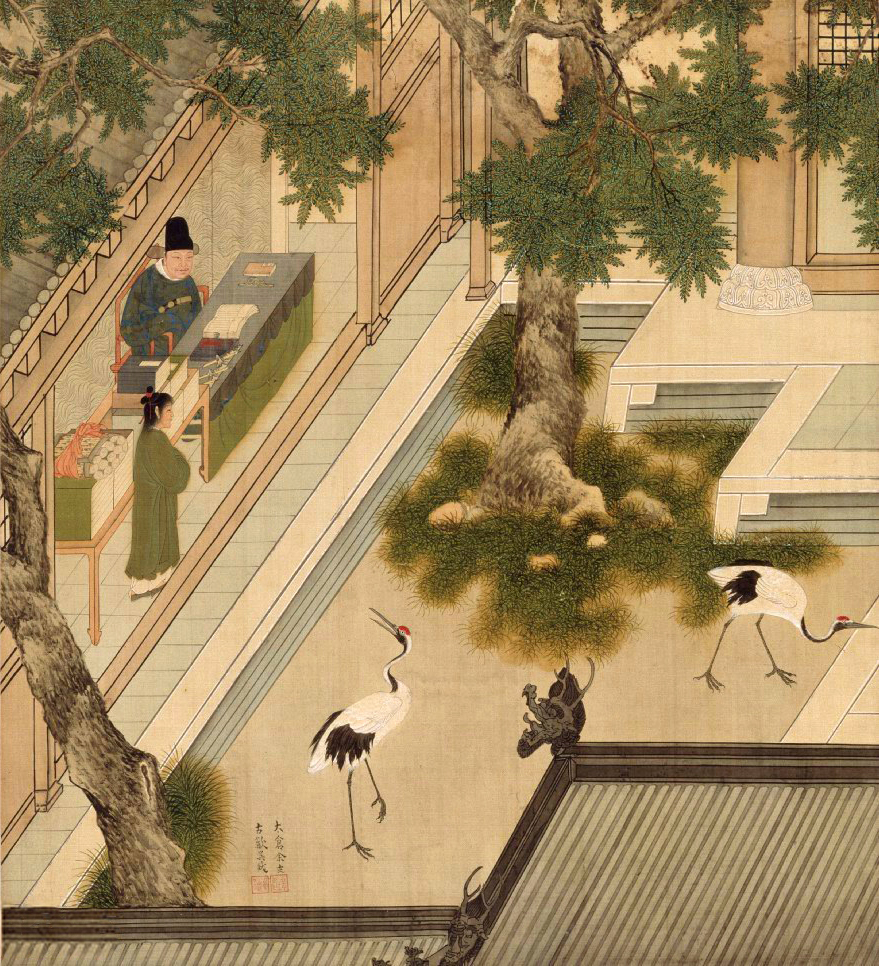
Xu Xianqing, then a Shujishi, studying in the Hanlin academy

Shujishi (Chinese: 庶吉士; pinyin: shù jí shì; Manchu: ᡤᡝᡵᡝᠨ
ᡤᡳᠯᡨᡠᠰᡳ geren giltusi) which means "All good men of virtue" is a scholastic title during the Ming and Qing dynasty of China. It can be used to denote a group of people who hold this title as well as individuals who possess the title.

== Etymology ==
The name of this title traces its origin back to the Book of Documents (also known as the Shû King through the translation of James Legge) which is written in old Chinese language. In the chapter "The establishment of government" (立政), the phrase "All good men of constant virtue (庶常吉士)" which is pronounced as "Shuchangjishi" appeared during a conversation between Duke of Zhou, a moral model of Confucianism and regent, and King Cheng of Zhou, the ruler of China in the early 11th century BC. Duke of Zhou asks his nephew King of Cheng to appoint officials with great care and prudence. He elaborated on the subject of the selection of officials and its significance in relation to the well-being of the government. All good men of constant virtue, according to Duke of Zhou, are the ones that are to be trusted and assigned with important tasks.

== Official use ==
In Ming China and Qing China, The title Shujishi is granted solely to the Jinshi rank. The Jinshi are a group of intellectuals that has passed the imperial exams.

The Shujishi was installed in the year of 1385 by the decree of the Hongwu Emperor of the Ming dynasty, it was the 18th year of his rule when Shujishi first appeared in the records of history. Novices of the Jinshi rank undergo a process of selection and some of them are bestowed the title Shujishi. Once became Shujishi, they work as apprentice in the Hanlin Academy with the purpose of perfecting their skills of administration. During the reign of Emperor Yingzong of Ming, the definition of Shujishi was narrowed down. Jinshi from the second place (二甲) or the third place (三甲) who are outstanding in terms of virtue are selected to be Shujishi in the Hanlin Academy. These elite Jinshi are called "Academy's selection" (館選). The Jinshi who obtained top place in the imperial exams received more privileged titles such as Xiuzhuan (修撰) and Bianxiu (編修). However, Xiuzhuan and Bianxiu are distinct titles that are different from Shujishi.

A stricter standard was applied during the reign of the Yongzheng Emperor of the Qing dynasty. All Shujishi hold the title for a term of three years before being officially examined. During the three year long period, they study with experienced scholars in the Hanlin Academy. These Shujishi who had not received an official examination were called Sanguan (散館). Once Sanguan's knowledge were examined, those who were able to achieve success in their study will be formally accepted as a scholar of the Hanlin Academy while those who were inferior to their peer Shujishi will be allotted to other departments of government.
