= Xu Xianqing =

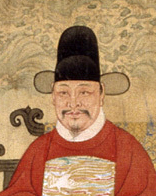
- Xu Xianqing wearing common official uniform

Vice-Minister of Rites
- In office 1587-1588
- Monarch: Wanli Emperor

Vice-Minister of Personnel
- In office 1588-1589
- Monarch: Wanli Emperor

Personal details
- Born: 1537 Suzhou
- Died: 1602 (aged 65) Jiaxing

Xu Xianqing
- Traditional Chinese: 徐顯卿
- Simplified Chinese: 徐显卿
Transcriptions
Standard Mandarin
- Hanyu Pinyin: Xú Xiǎnqīng
- IPA: [ɕy̌ ɕjɛ̀ntɕʰíŋ]

Xu Xianqing (simplified Chinese: 徐显卿; traditional Chinese: 徐顯卿; 1537–1602), courtesy name Gongwang (公望), pseudonym Jian'an (檢庵), was a Chinese statesman in the late Ming dynasty during the reigns of the Longqing and Wanli emperors.

Xianqing's literary work gained him much fame during his lifetime. His poems and essays are later collected and edited into the "Tianyuanlou Ji"(天遠樓集).

== Life ==
Native of Suzhou, Xu was born in a rich family of textile manufacturer. His mother died when he was 12. He passed the final stages of the imperial exams and received his jinshi (進士) degree in 1568 and worked in the Hanlin Academy for many years. In 1584, he was appointed chief of Guozijian, the highest national central educational institution of the Empire.

Xu was one of the main contributors of the final edition of the Collected Statutes of the Ming Dynasty.

In 1587, Xu was appointed as Vice-Minister of Rites and later became Vice-Minister of Personnel.

== Painting folio ==
In 1588, Xu asked two painters to draw the important events of his life. The painting folio, named Xu Xianqing Huanji Tu (Painting folio of Xu Xianqing's working career) is now in the Collections of the Palace Museum of Beijing. The folio contains vivid materials reflecting the ritual paraphernalia of the Ming court.

== Gallery ==
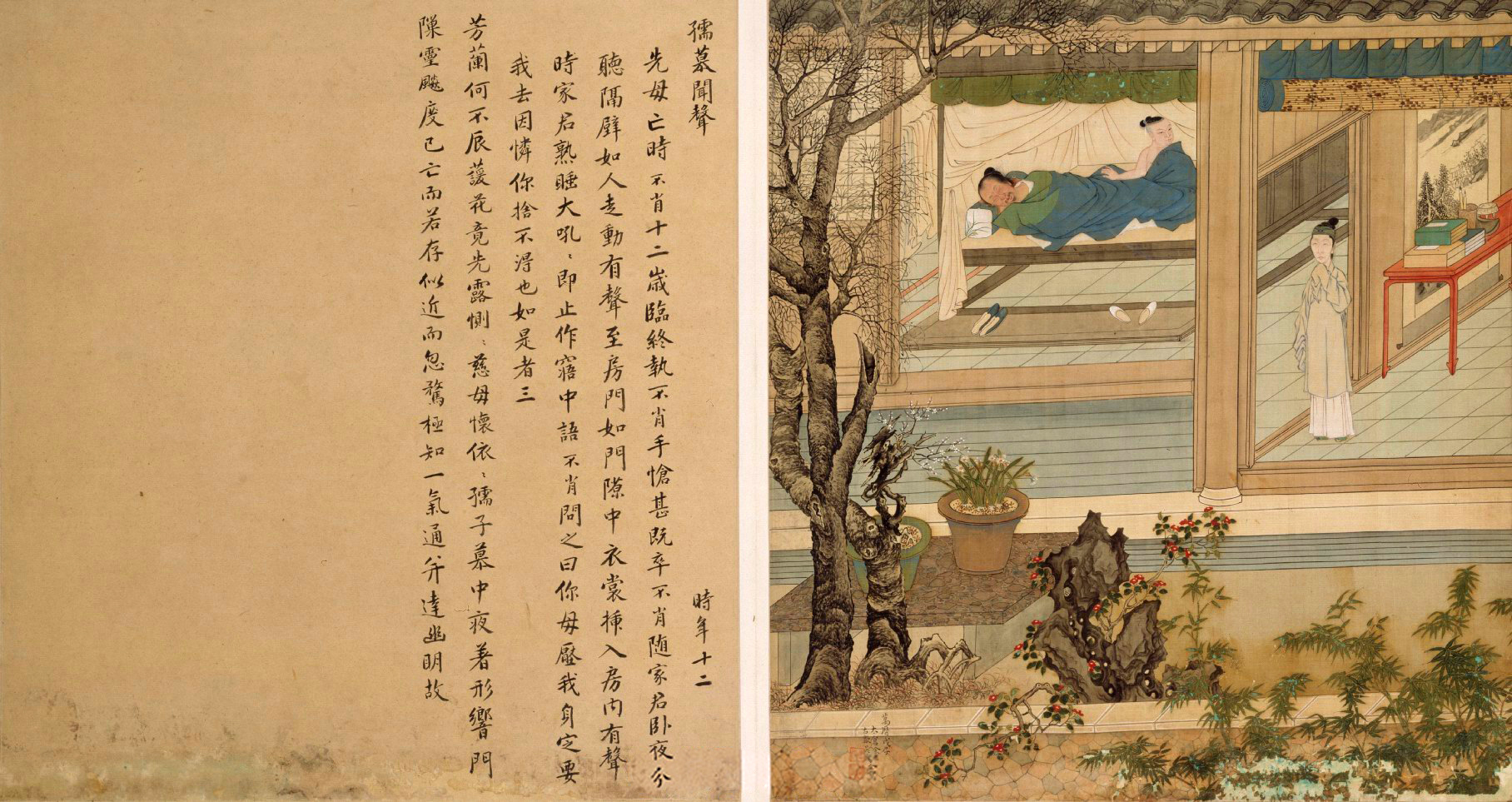
Xu's career No. 01 (孺慕聞聲): Xu's father dreaming about Xu's dead mother (Xu was 12)

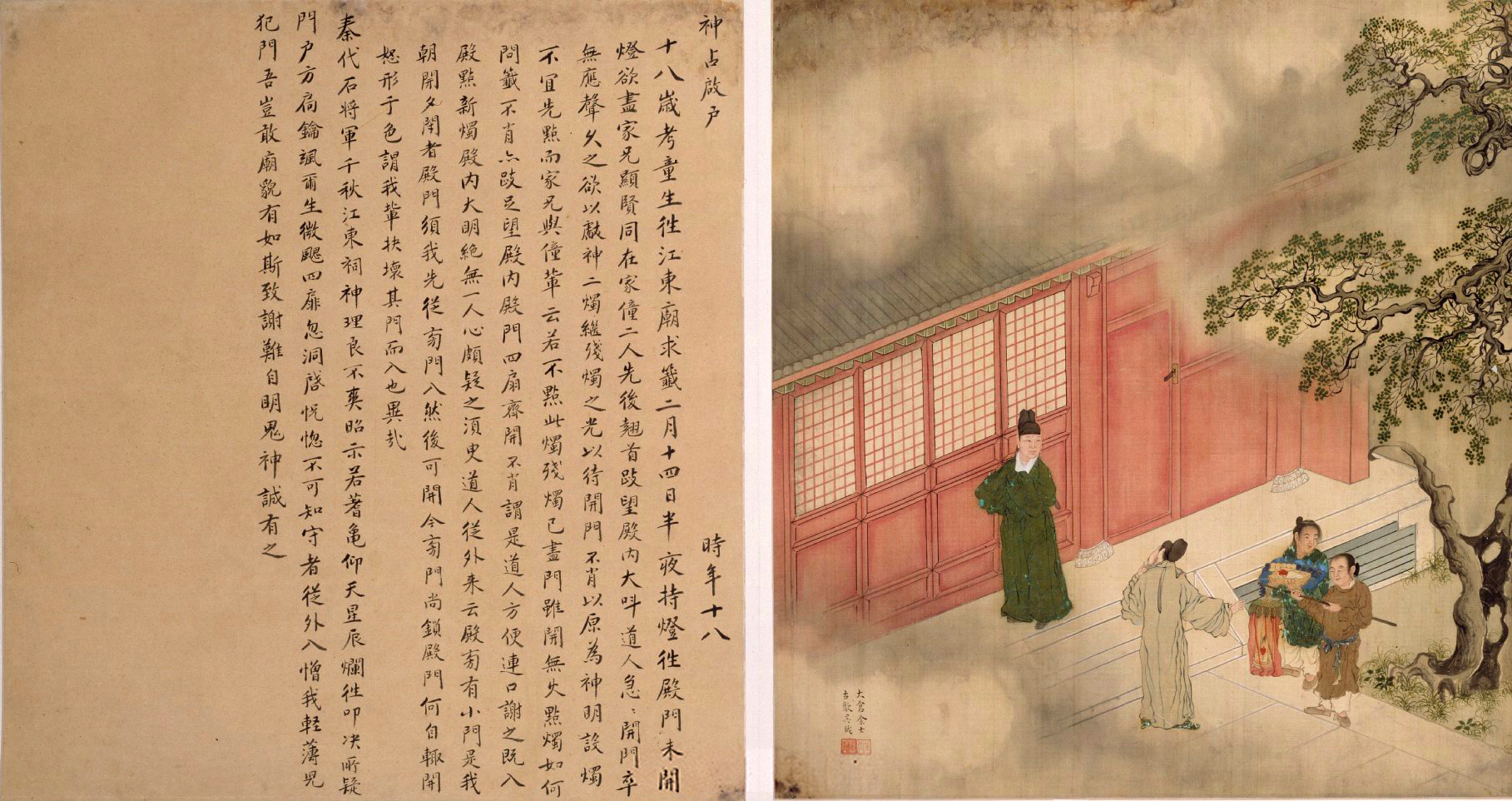
Xu's career No. 02 (神占啟戶): Xu was 18

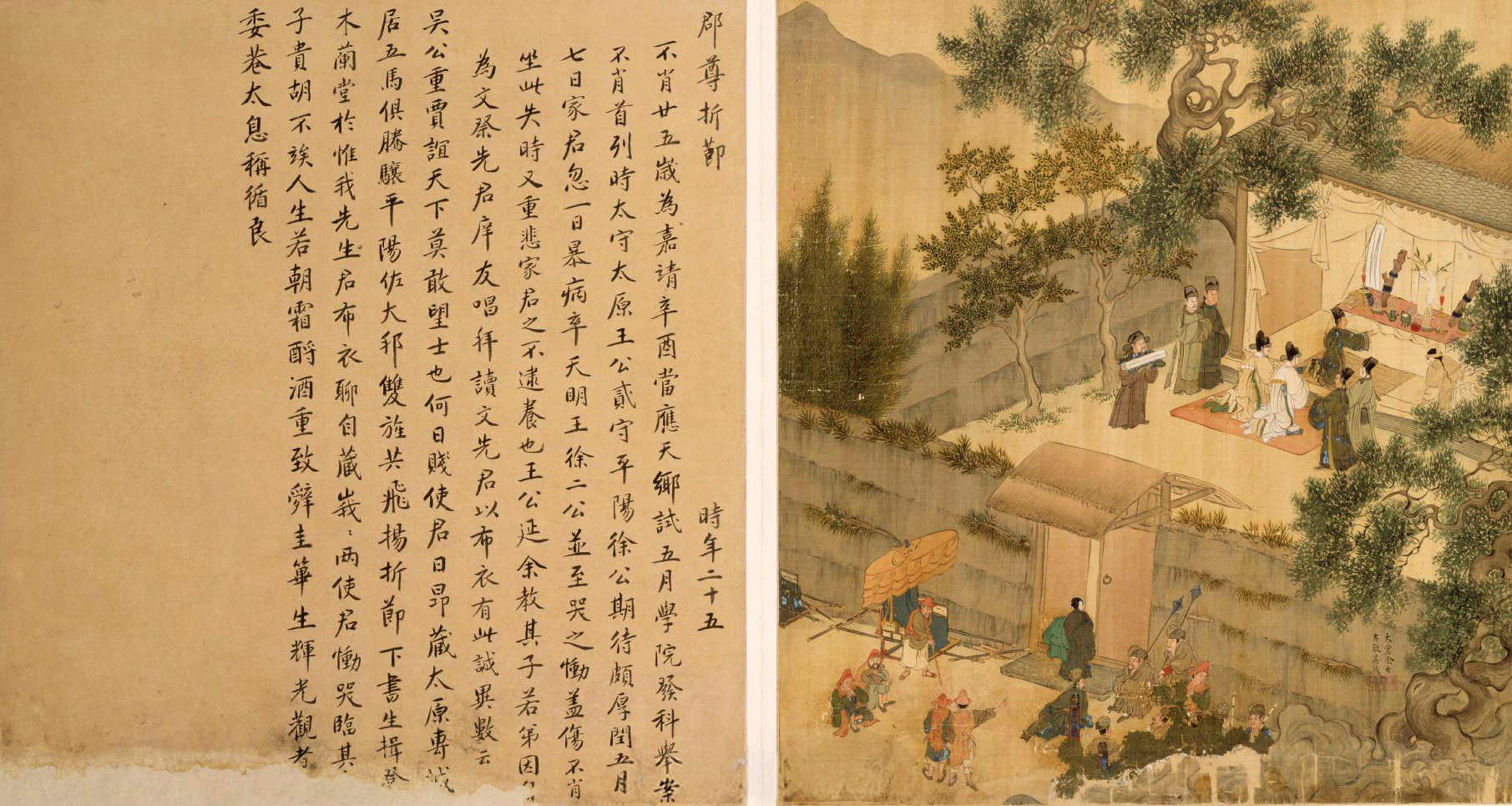
Xu's career No. 03 (郡尊折節): Funeral of Xu's father with presence of the magistrate and vice-magistrate of the profecture of Suzhou (Xu was 25)

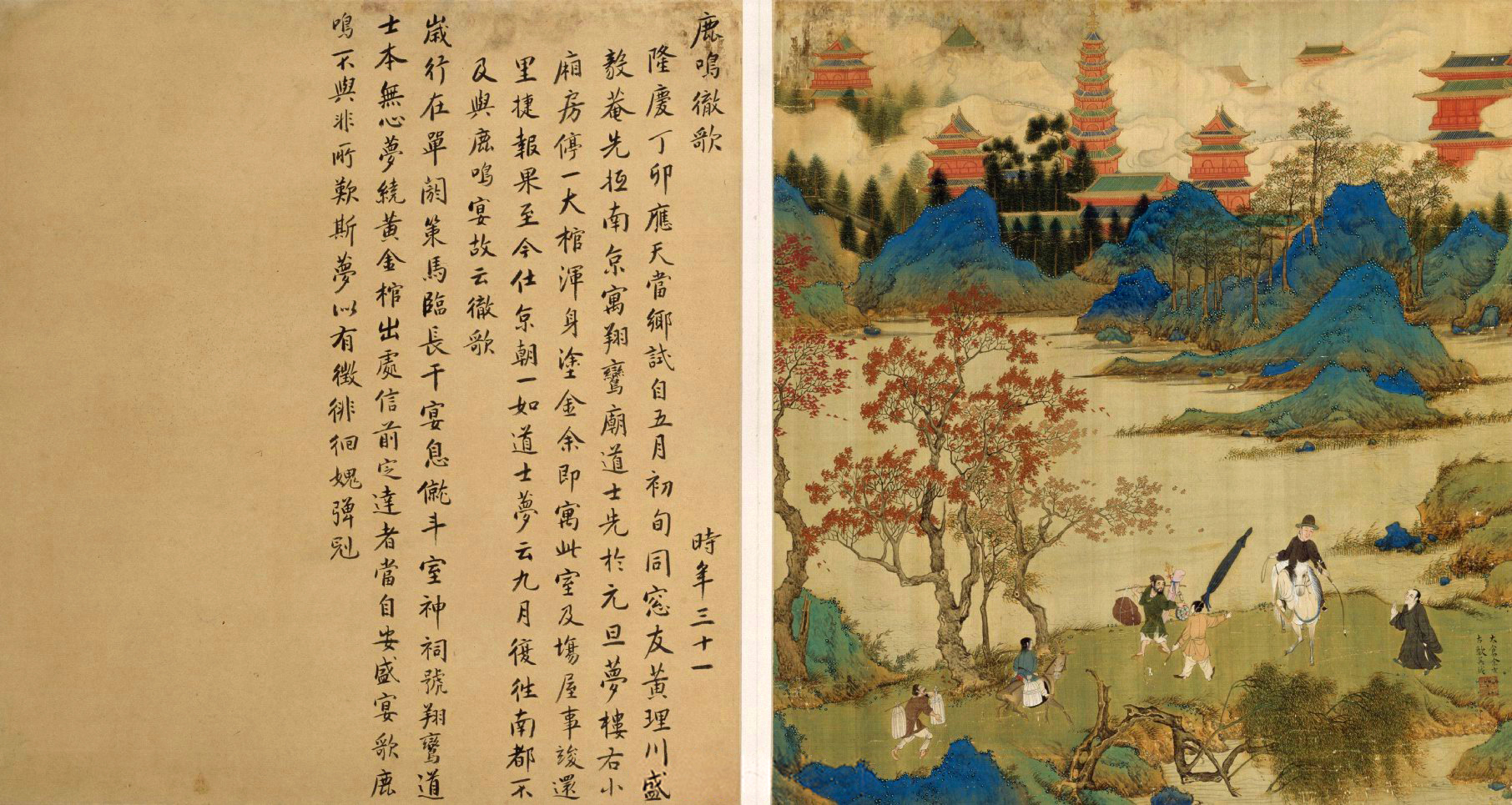
Xu's career No. 04 (鹿鳴徹歌): Obtaining the Juren degree at the age of 31

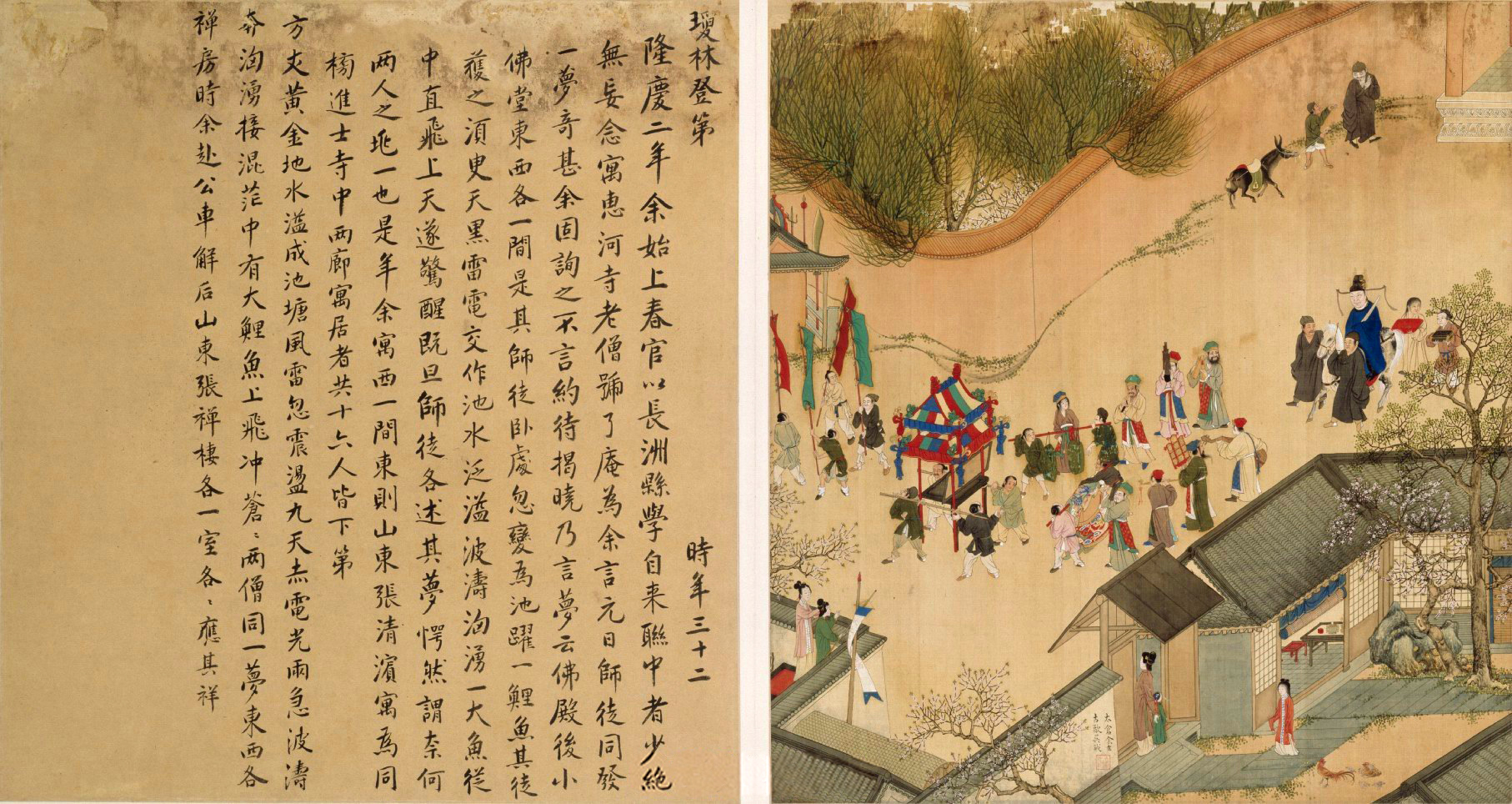
Xu's career No. 05 (瓊林登第): Obtaining the Jinshi degree at the age of 32

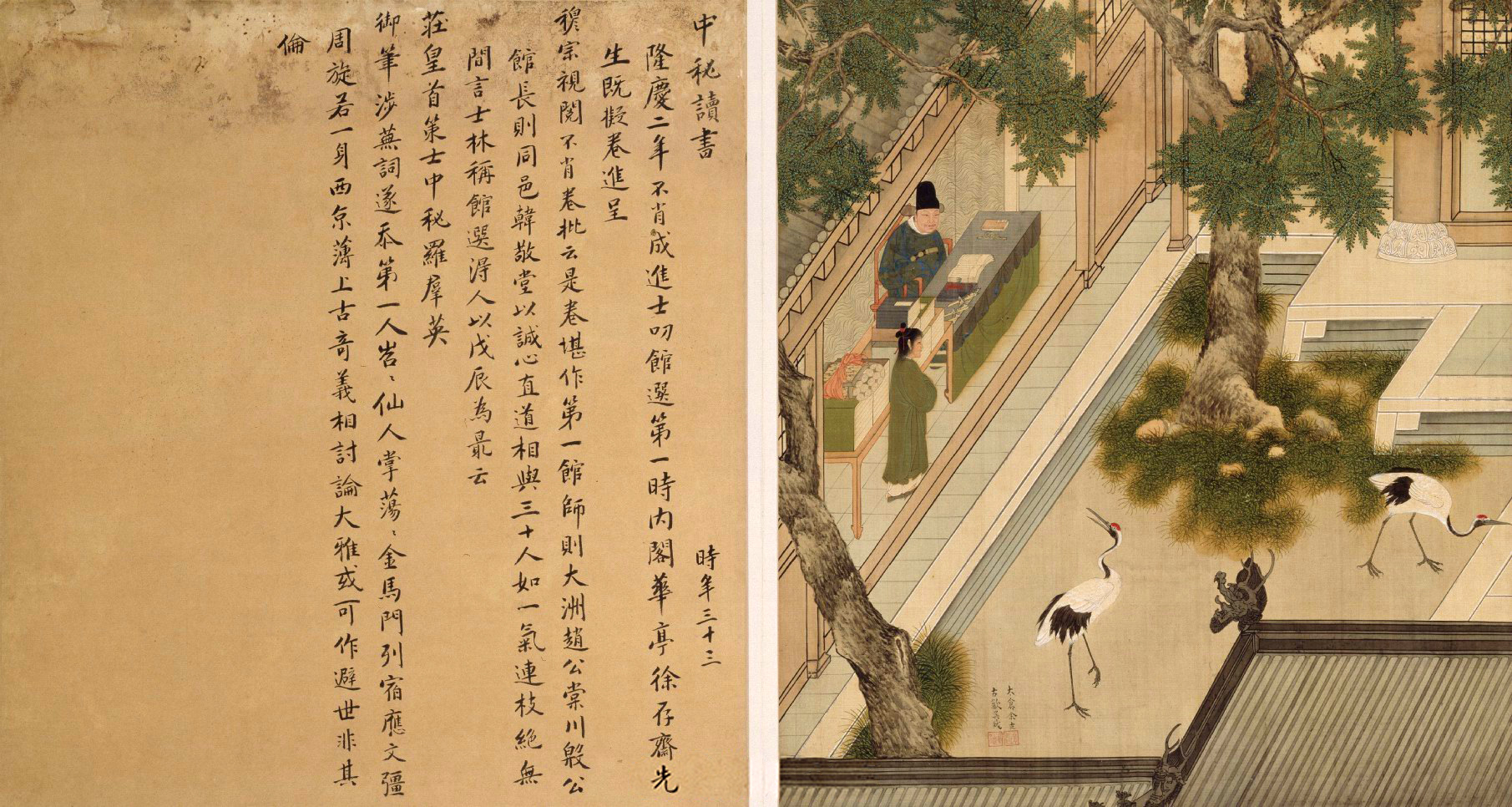
Xu's career No. 06 (中秘讀書): Reading classical books in Hanlin Academy (Xu was 33)

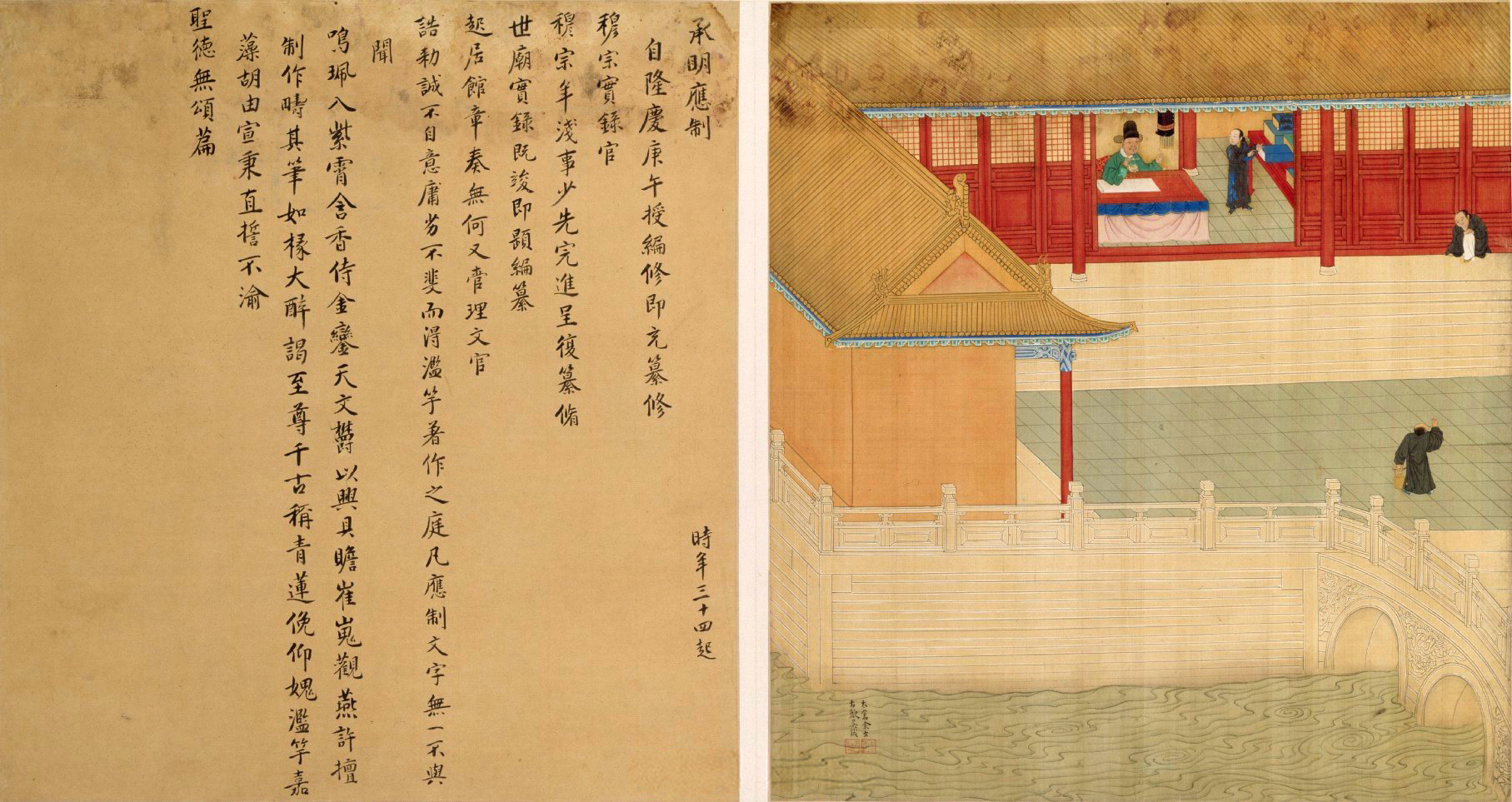
Xu's career No. 07 (承明應制): Editing imperial regulations (Xu was 34)

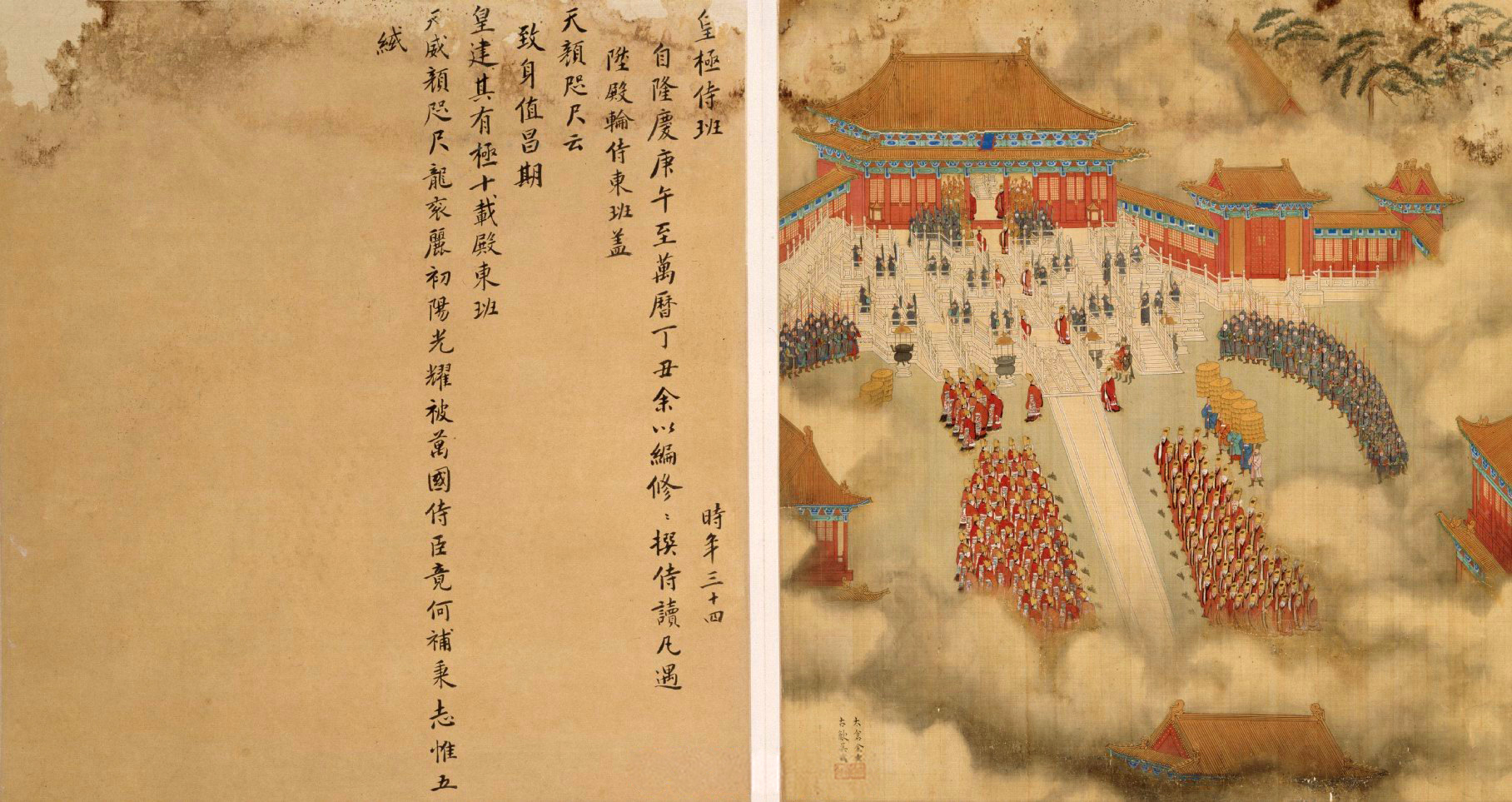
Xu's career No. 08 (皇極侍班): Ceremony in front of the Hall of Supreme Harmony (Xu was 34)

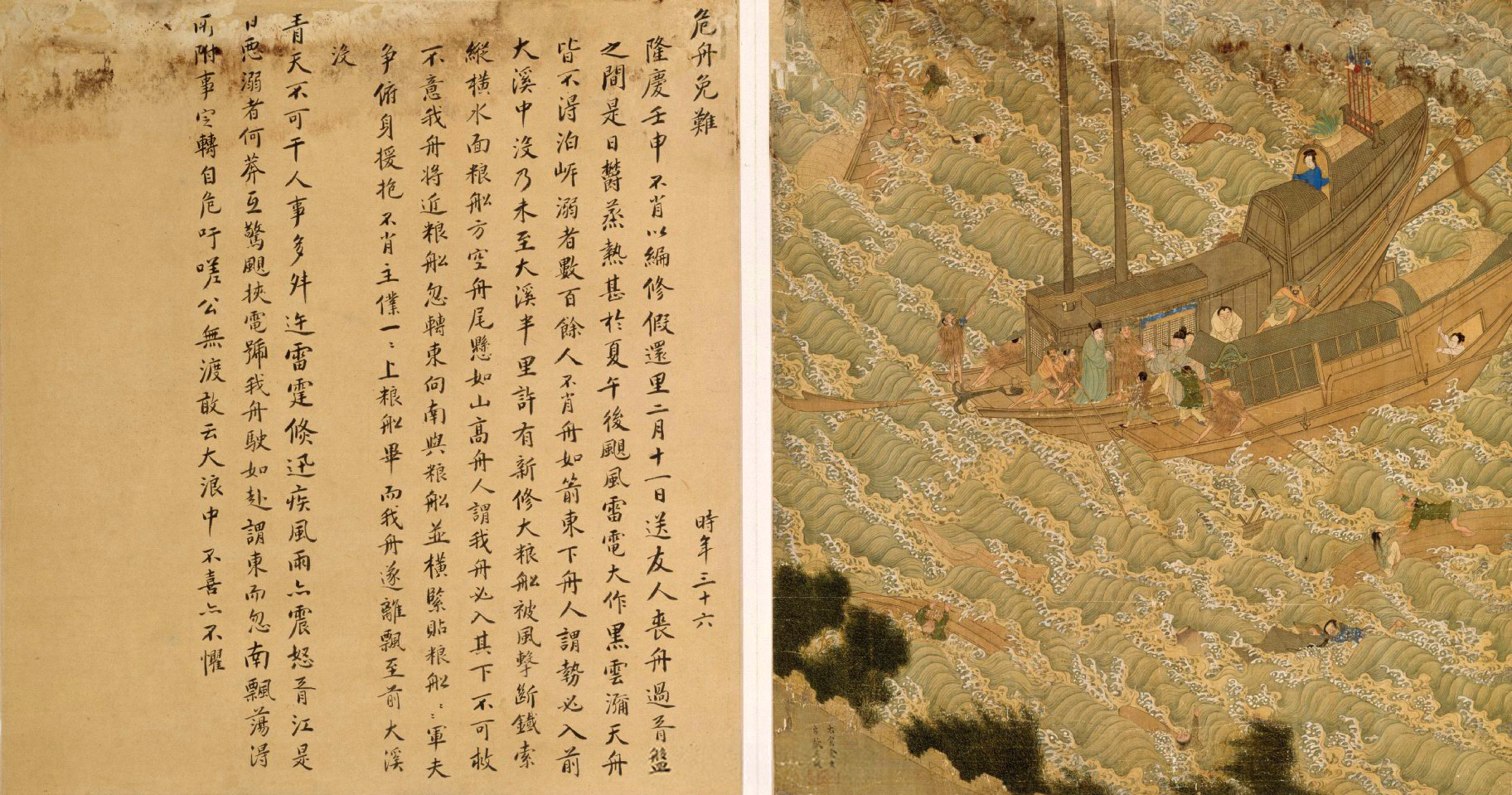
Xu's career No. 09 (危舟免難): Xu and his servants being saved from shipwreck during a storm near Suzhou (Xu was 36)

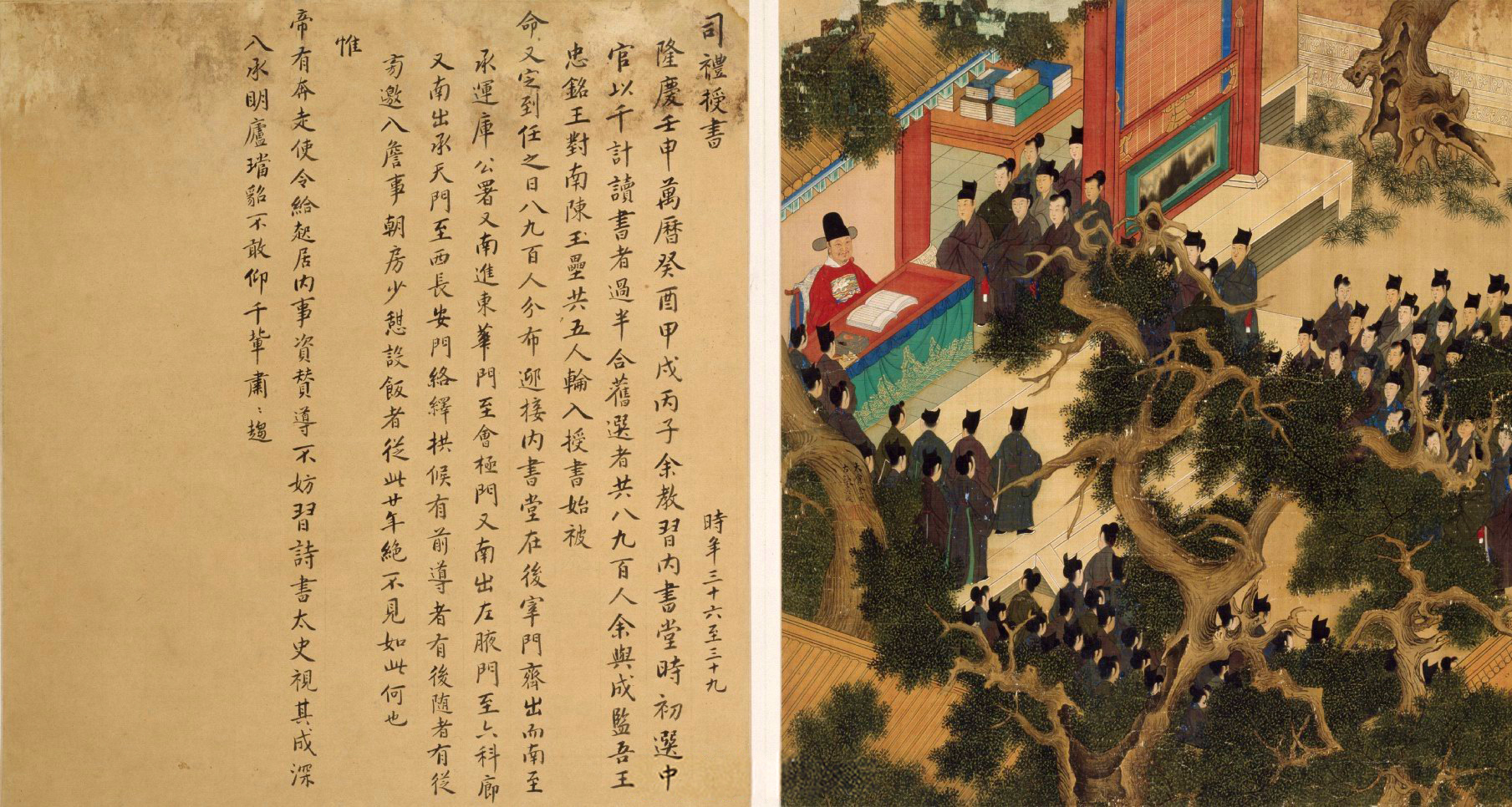
Xu's career No. 10 (司禮授書): Giving course to eunuchs (Xu was between 36 and 39 years old)

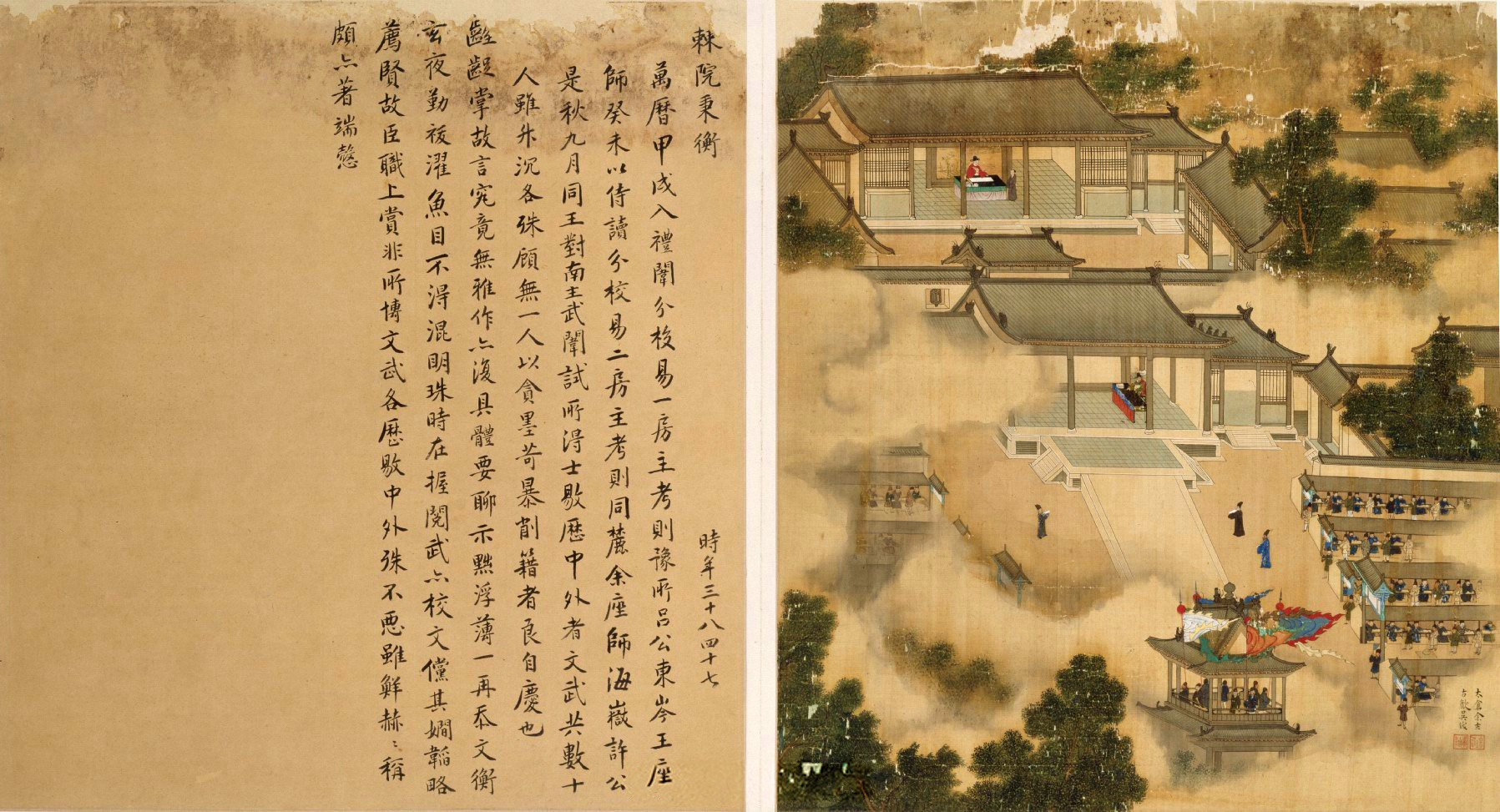
Xu's career No. 11 (棘院秉衡): Taking charge of the Imperial Examination (Xu was between 38 and 47 years old)

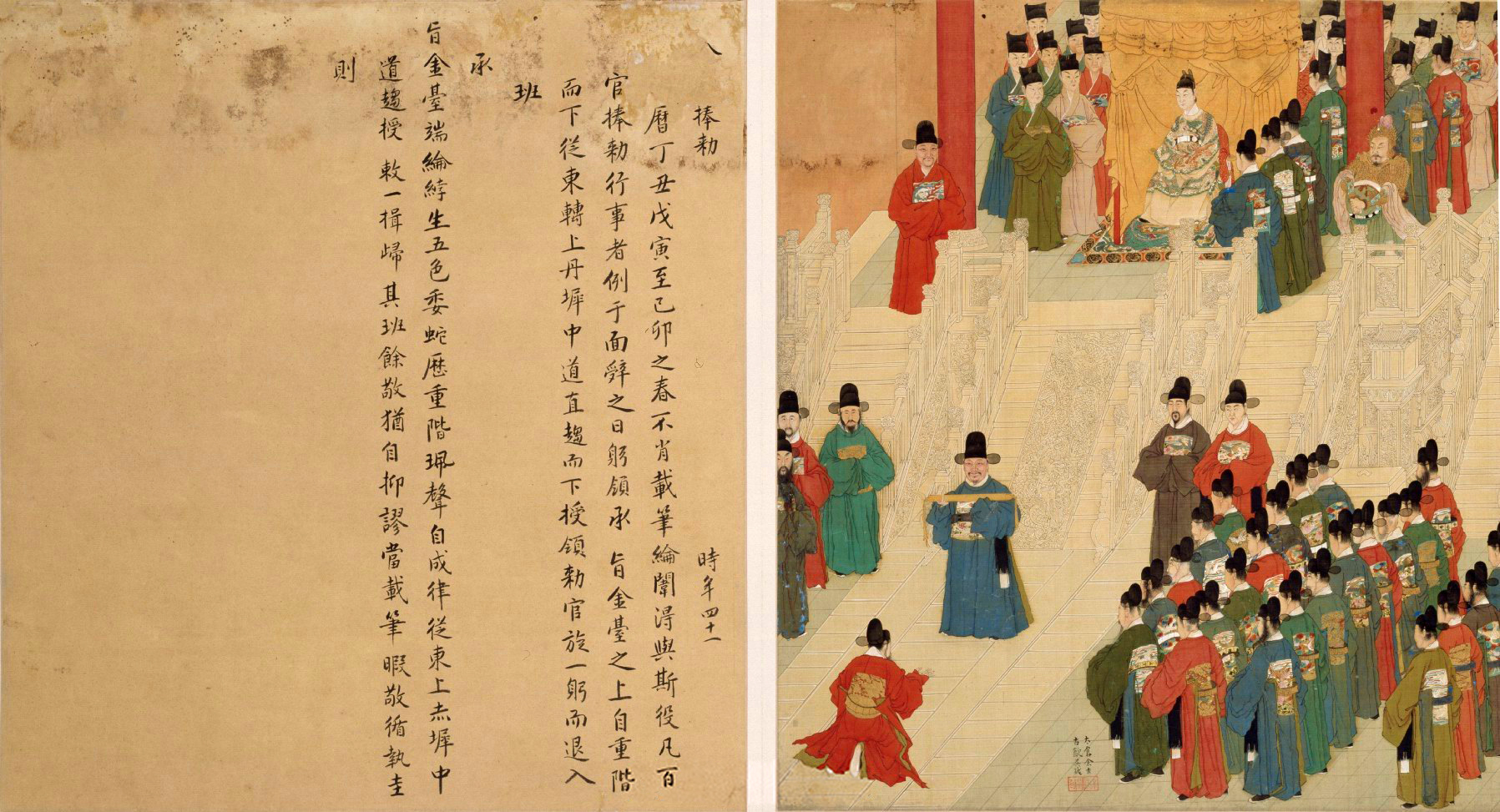
Xu's career No. 12 (金臺吹敕): Passing imperial order in front of Wanli Emperor at the Forbidden City (Xu was 41)

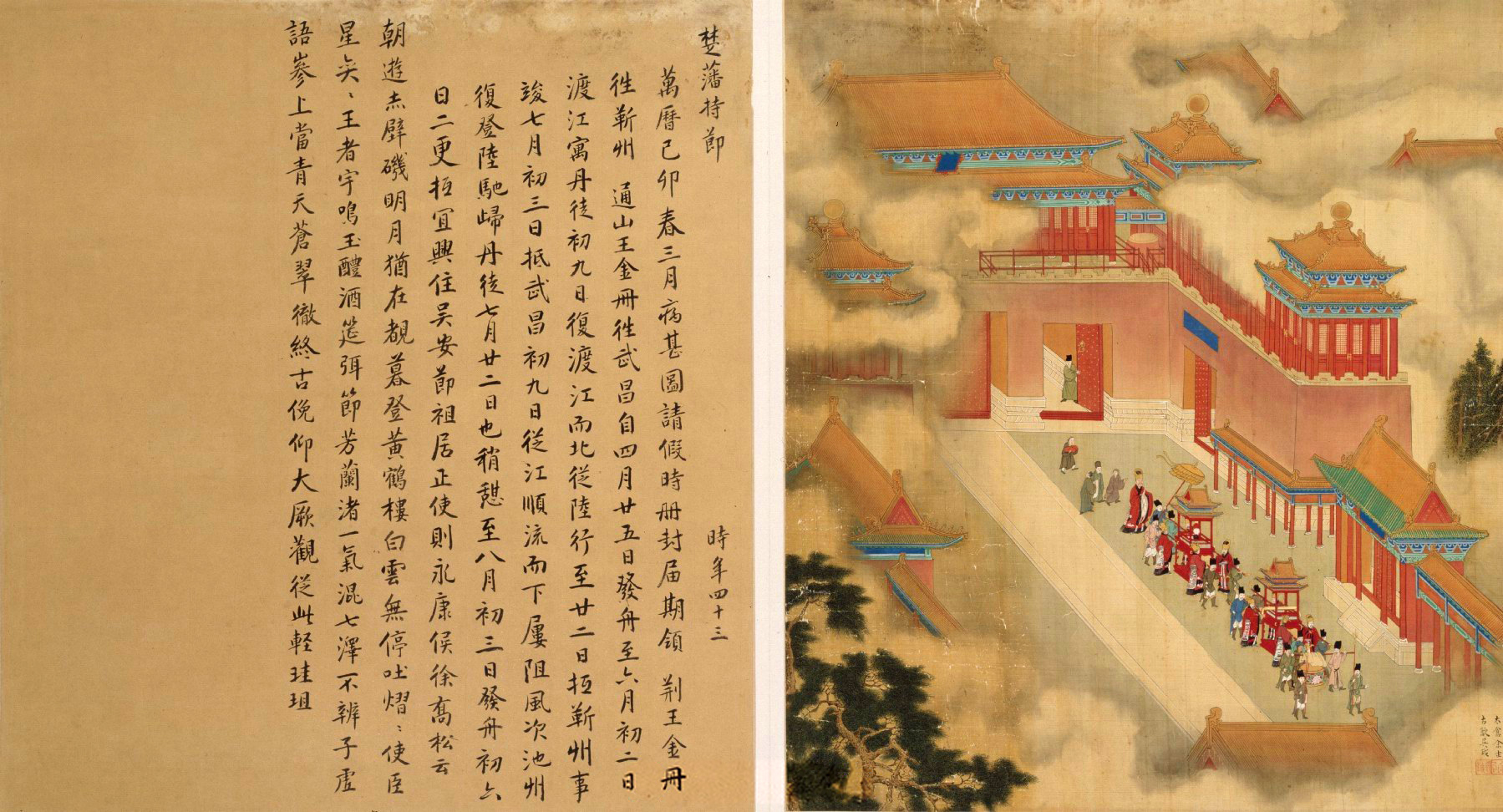
Xu's career No. 13 (楚藩持節): Conferring the vassal king of Chu (Xu was 43)

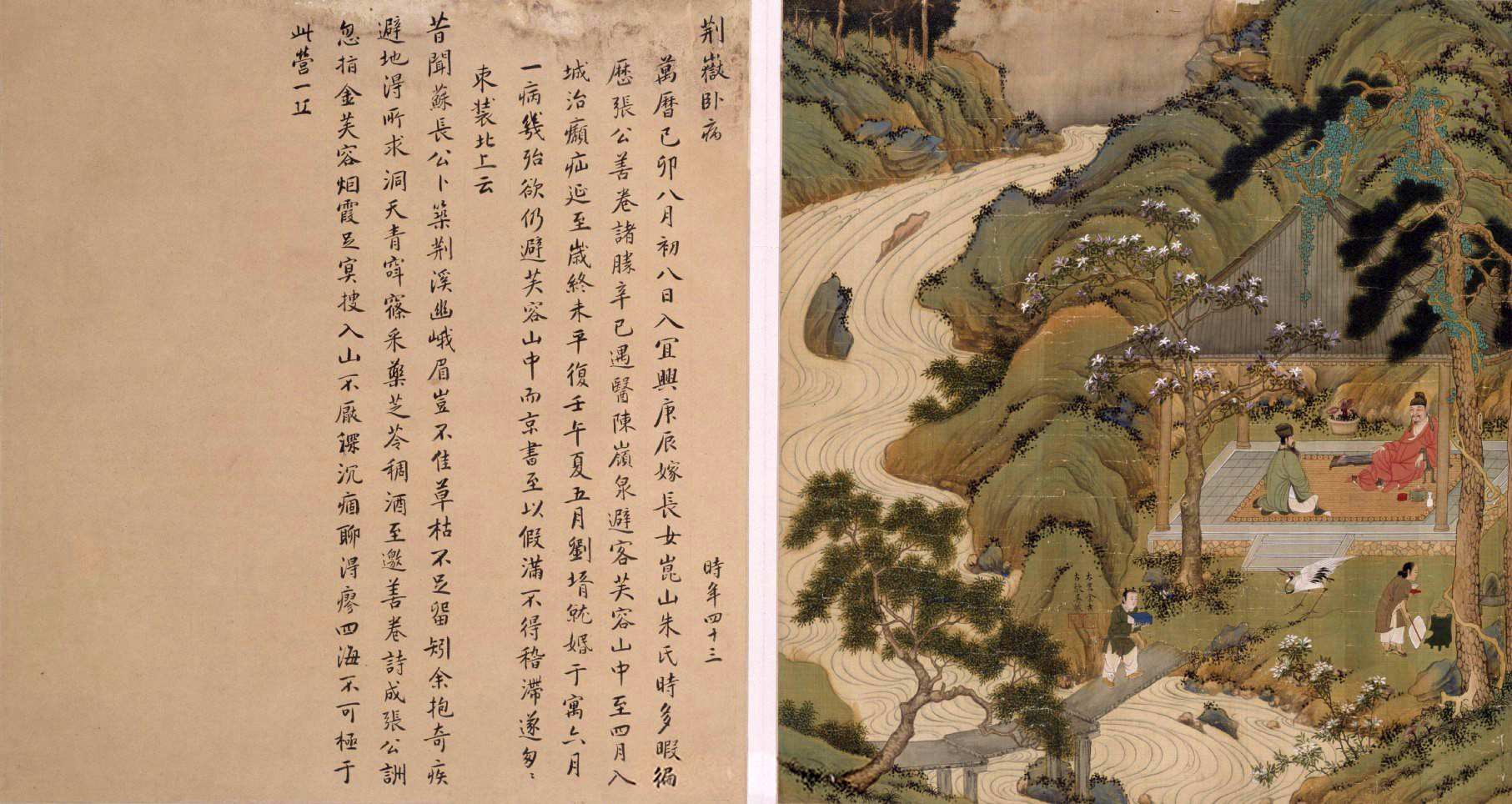
Xu's career No. 14 (荊嶽臥病): Treating a disease in the Furong mount near Yixing (Xu was 43)

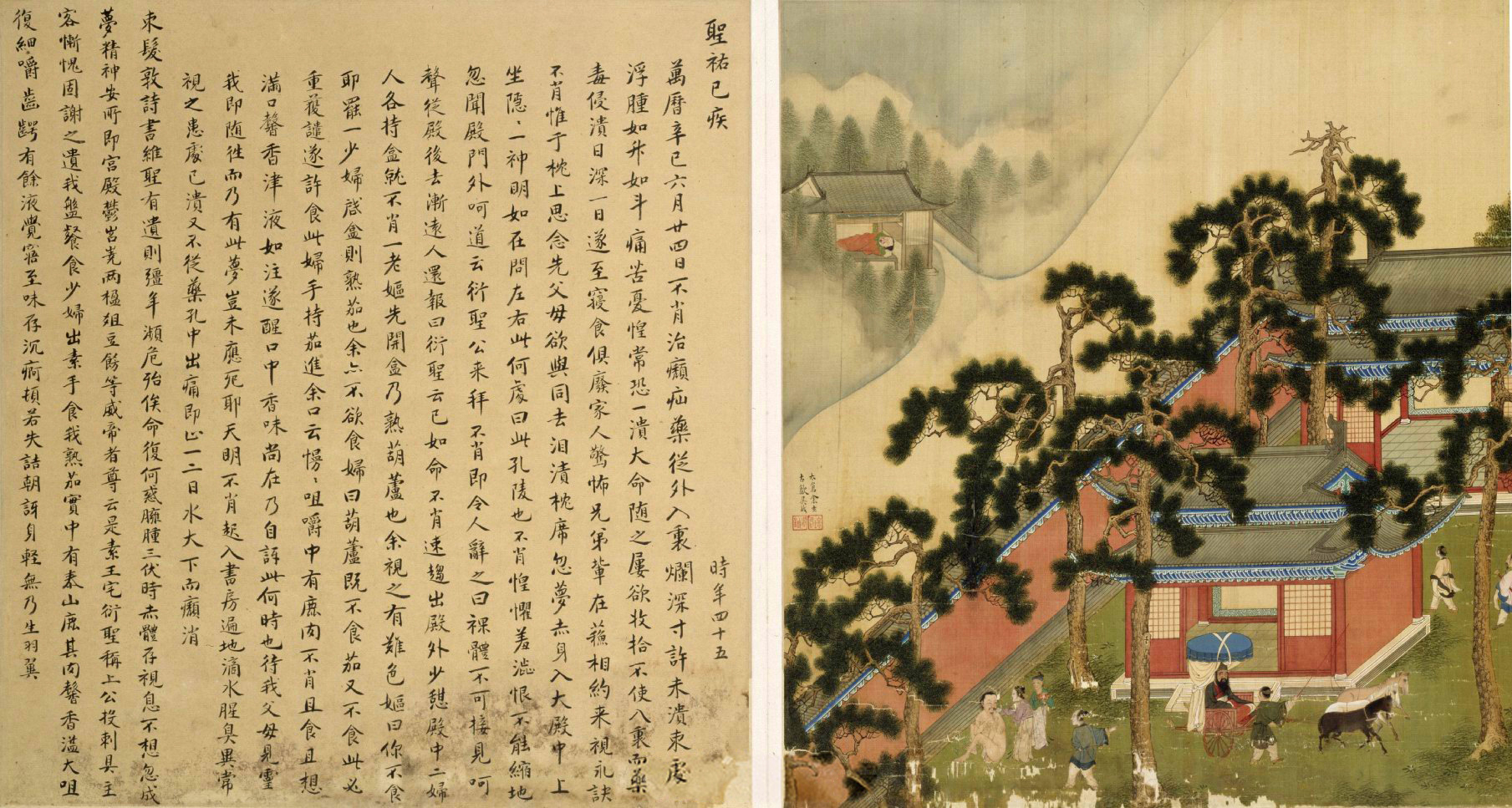
Xu's career No. 15 (聖祐己疾): Dreaming about Confucius and getting recovered (Xu was 45)

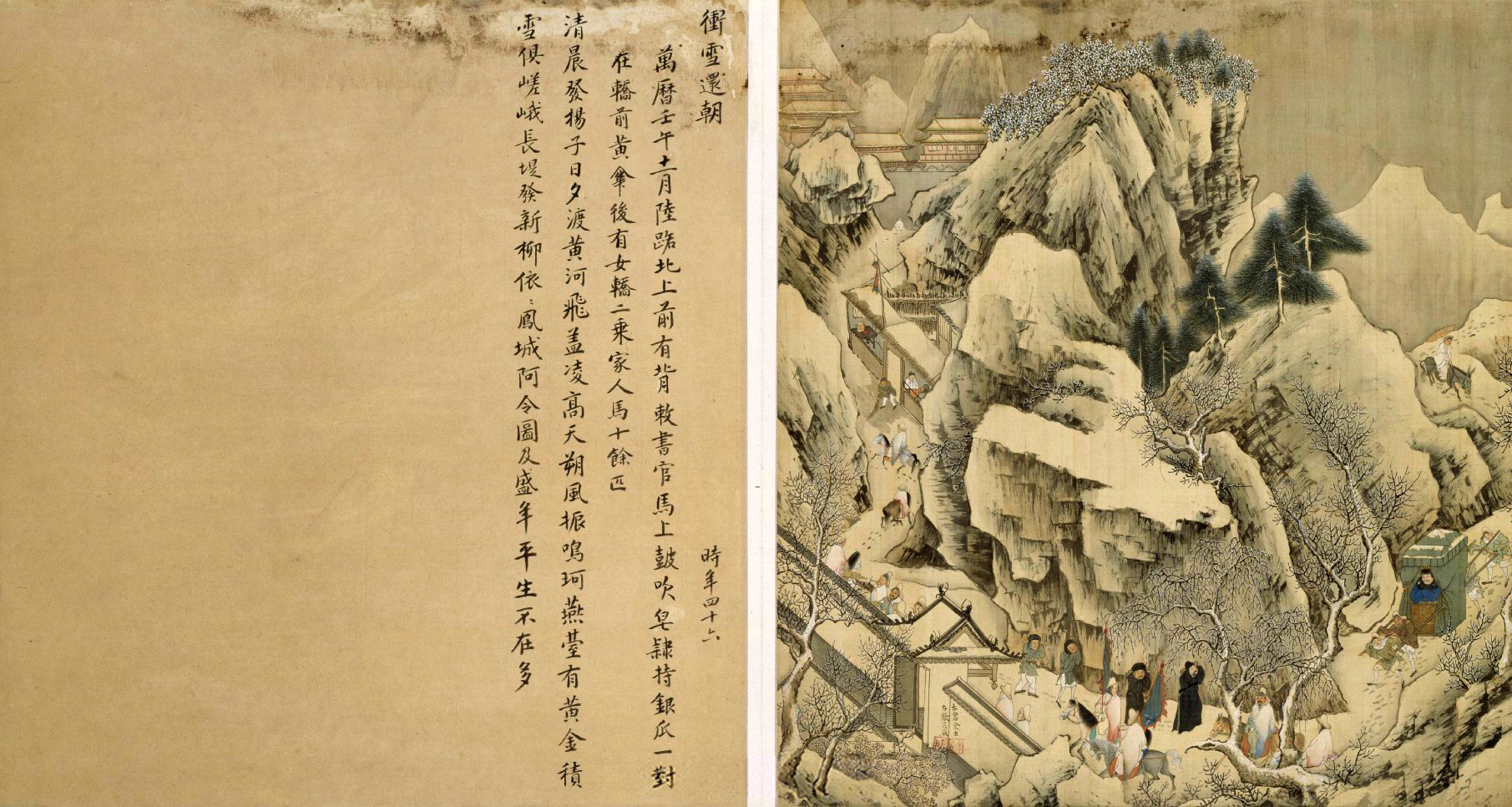
Xu's career No. 16 (衝雪還朝): Back to the capital in the heavy snow (Xu was 46)

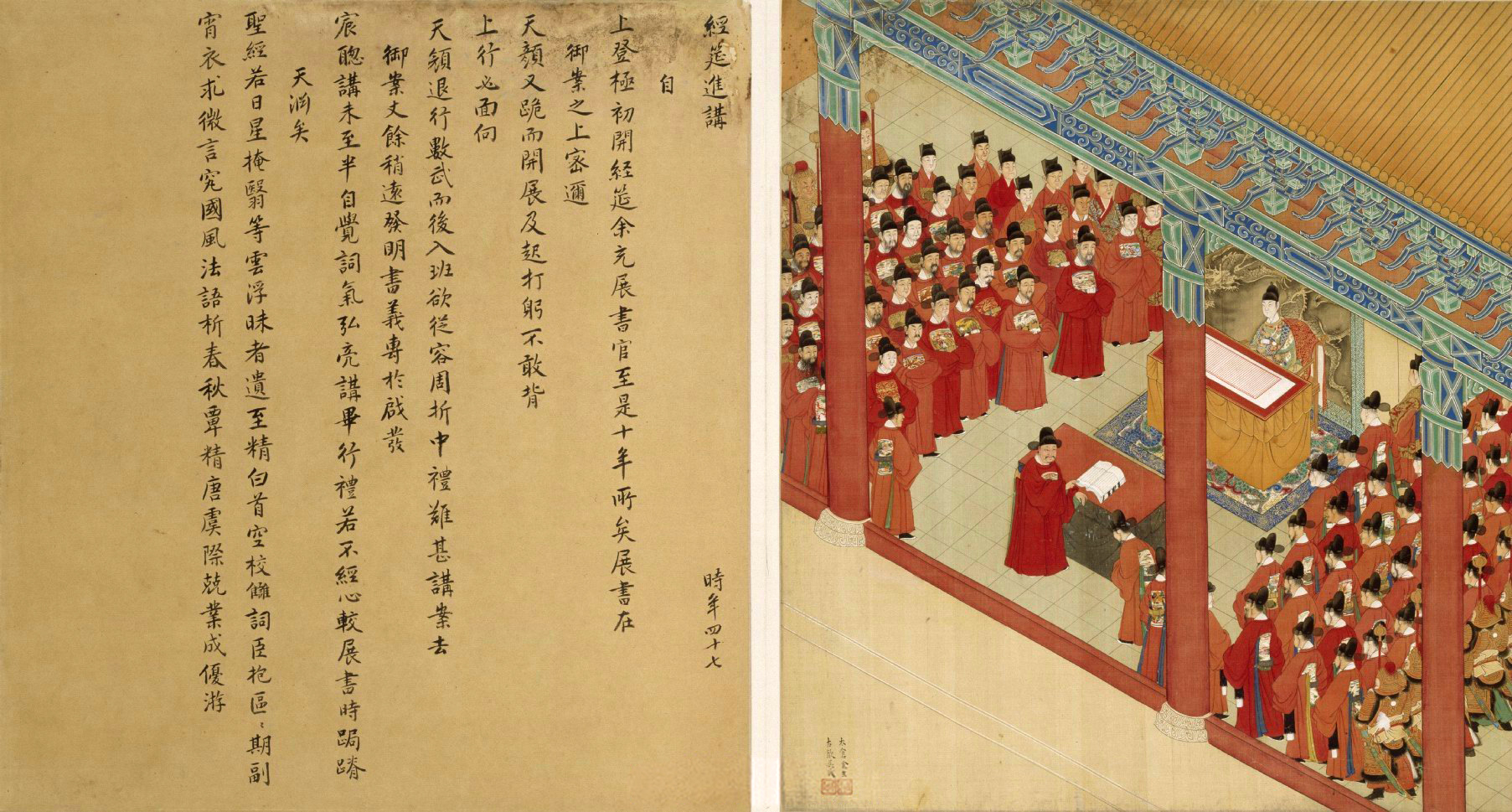
Xu's career No. 17 (經筵進講): Giving course to Wanli Emperor (Xu was 47)

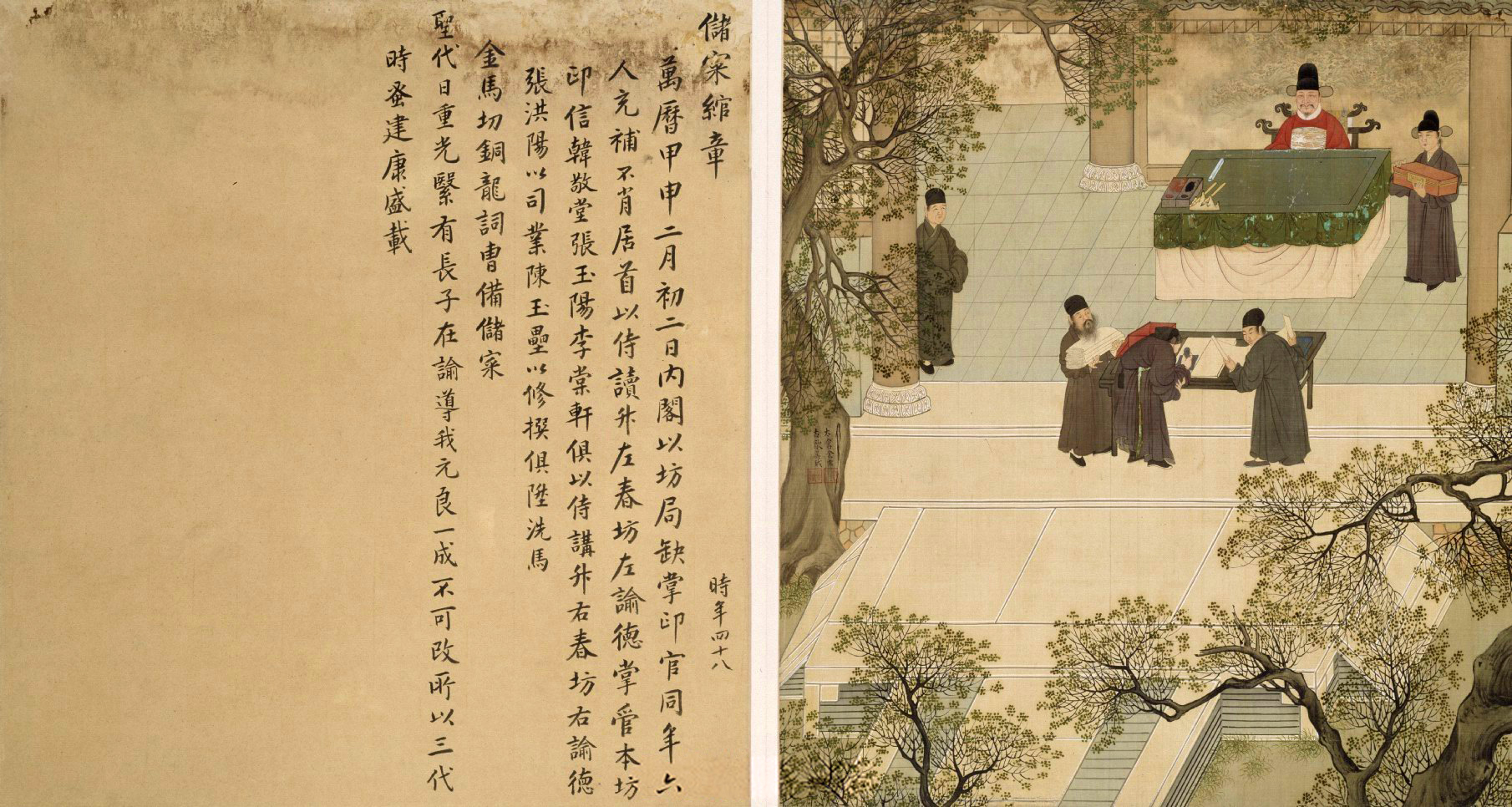
Xu's career No. 18 (儲寀綰章): Watching the use of official seal as chief of Zhanshifu (Xu was 48)

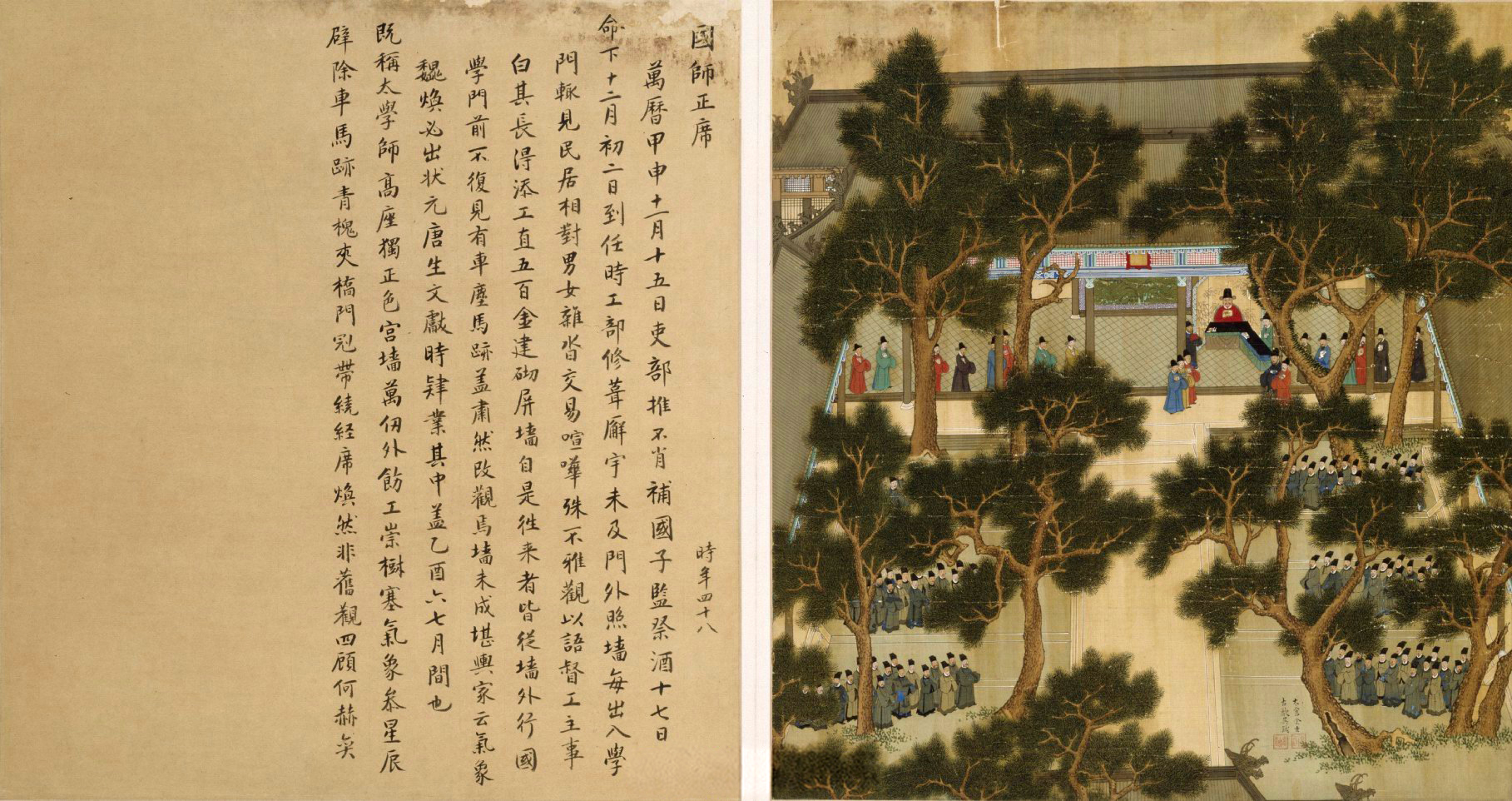
Xu's career No. 19 (國師正席): Watching the use of official seal as chief of Guozijian (Xu was 48)

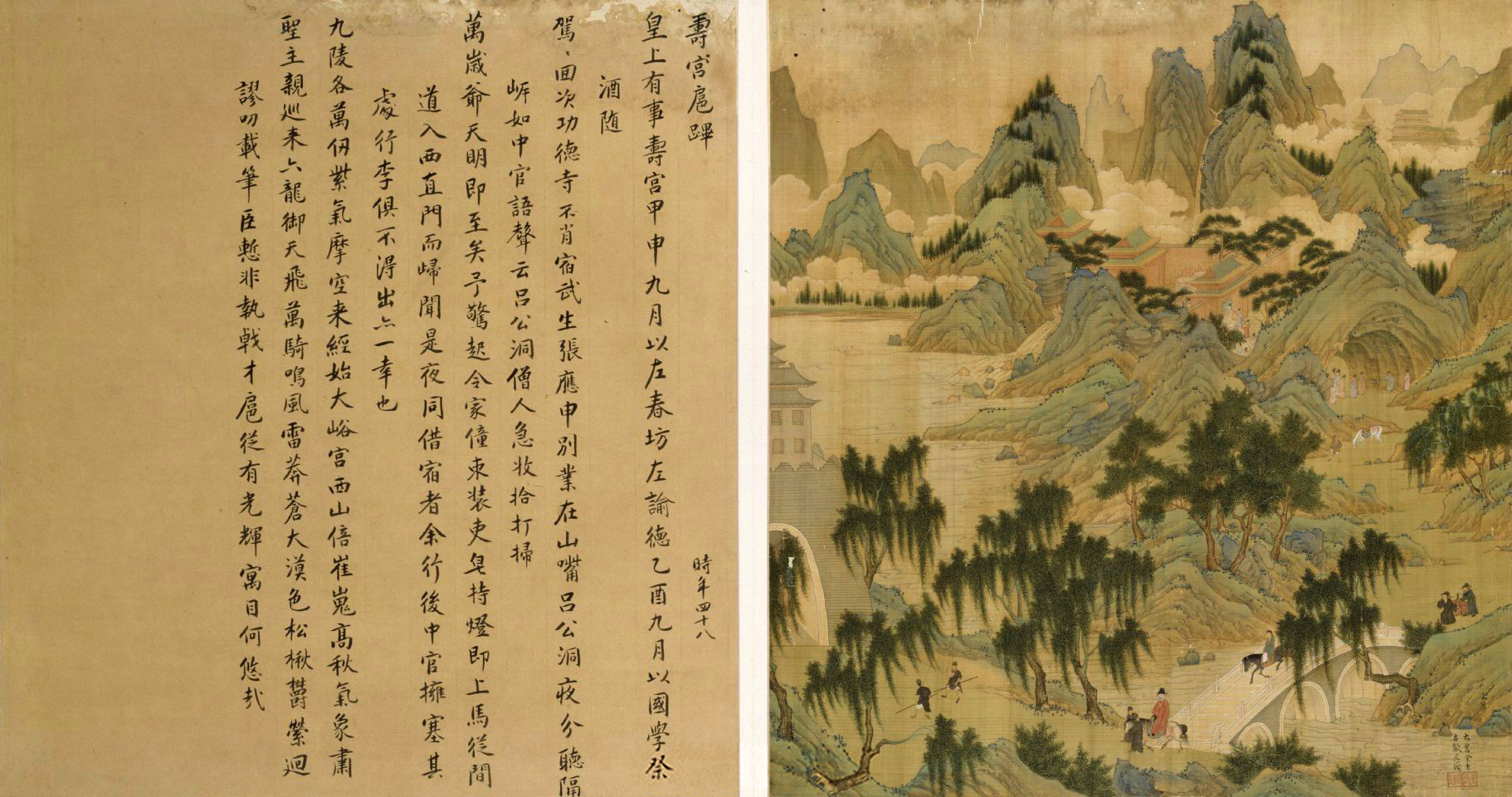
Xu's career No. 20 (壽宮扈蹕): Accompanying Wanli Emperor during an inspection visit to the Imperial mausoleums (Xu was 48)

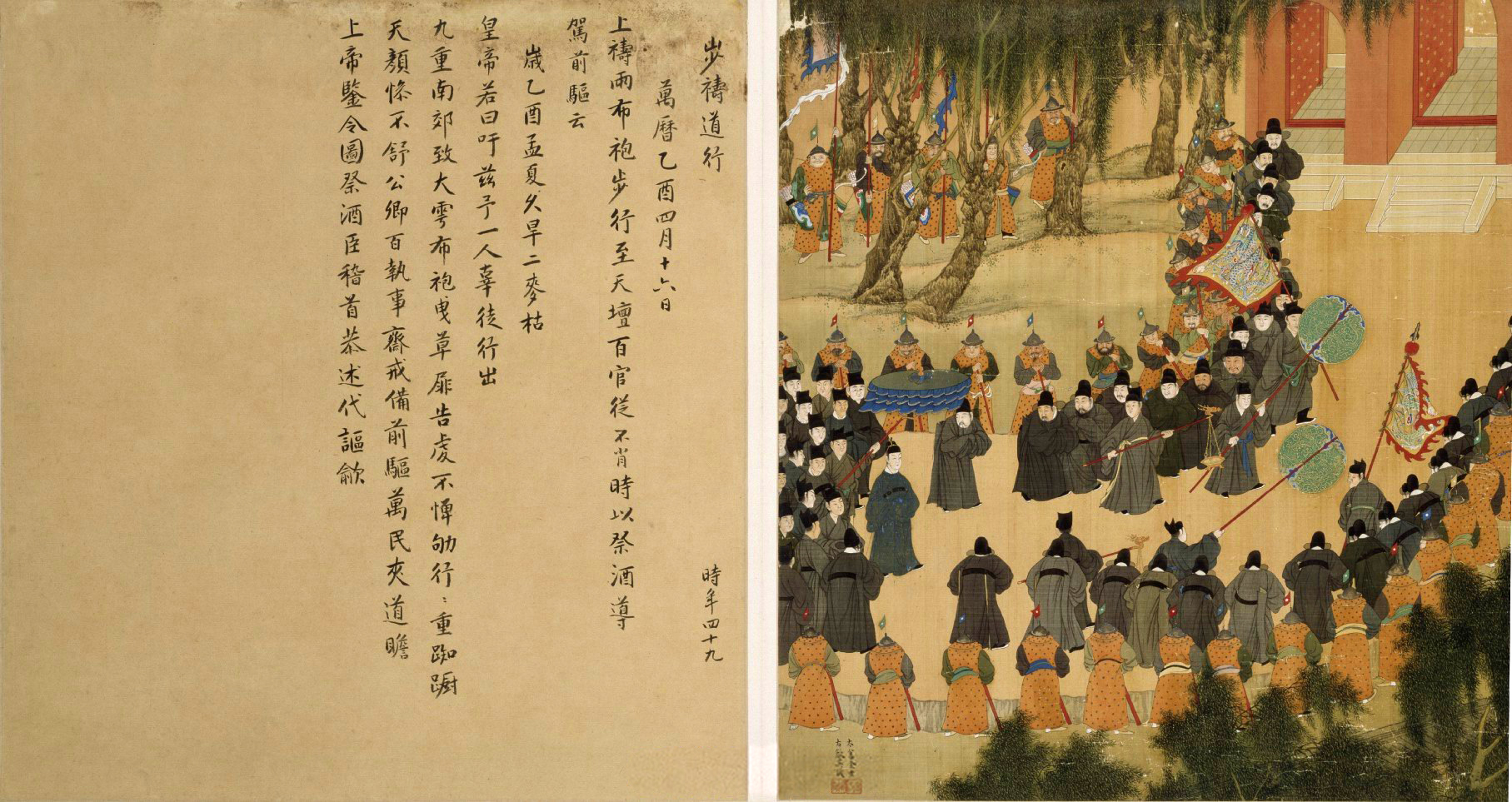
Xu's career No. 21 (歲禱道行): Leading Wanli Emperor who was walking to the Temple of Heaven (Xu was 49)

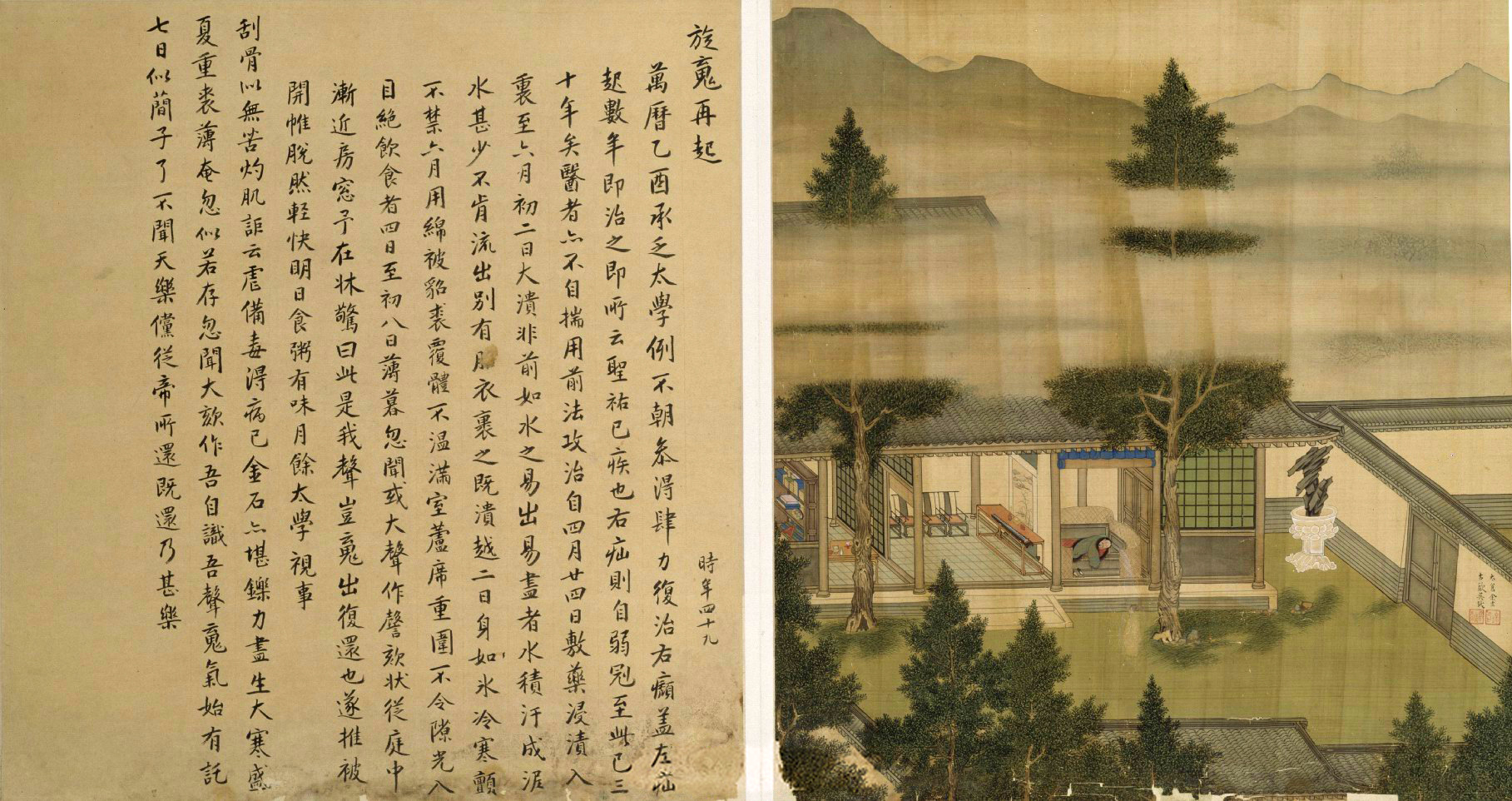
Xu's career No. 22 (旋魂再起): Falling ill again (Xu was 49)

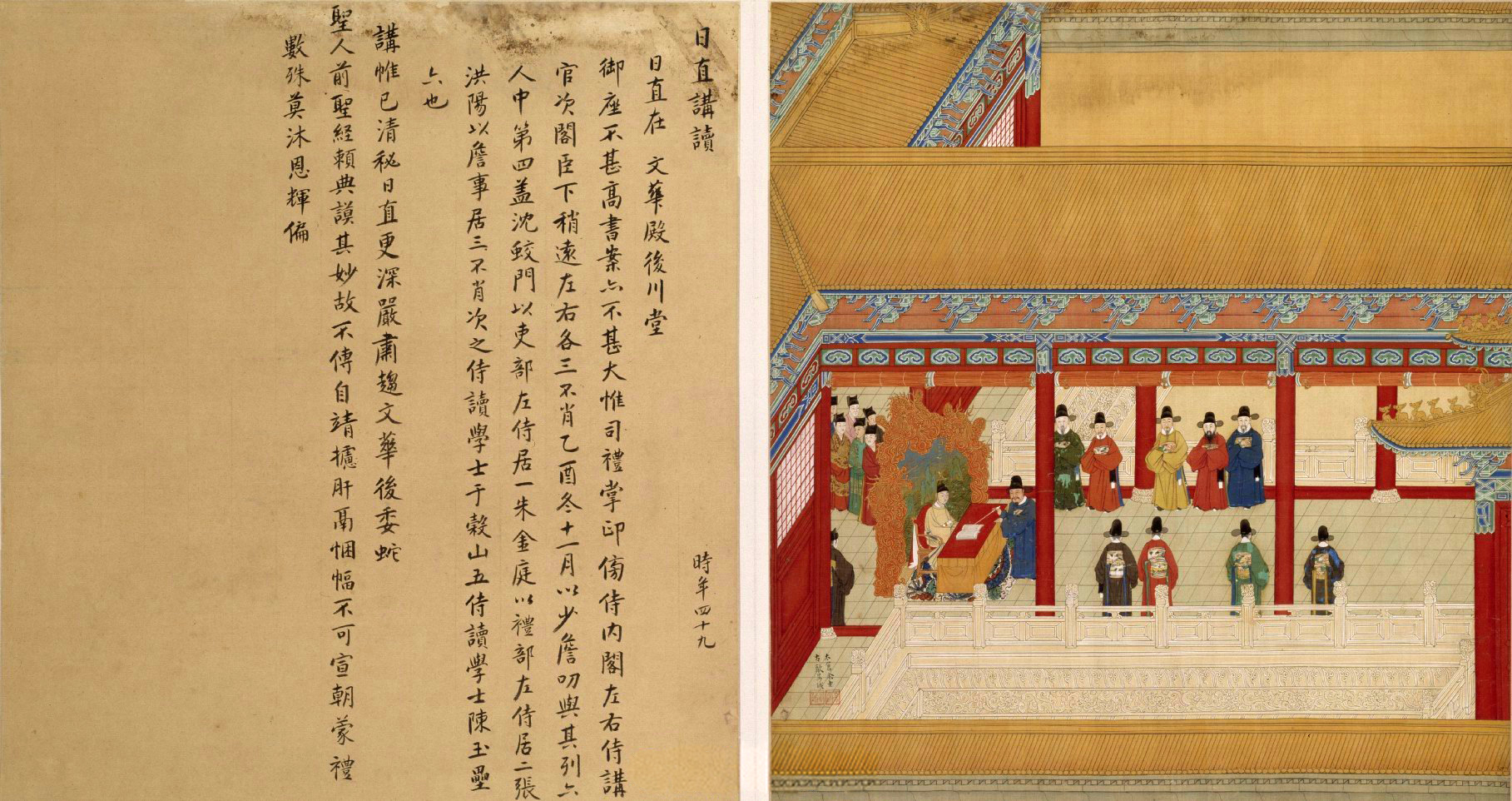
Xu's career No. 23 (日直講讀): at the age of 49

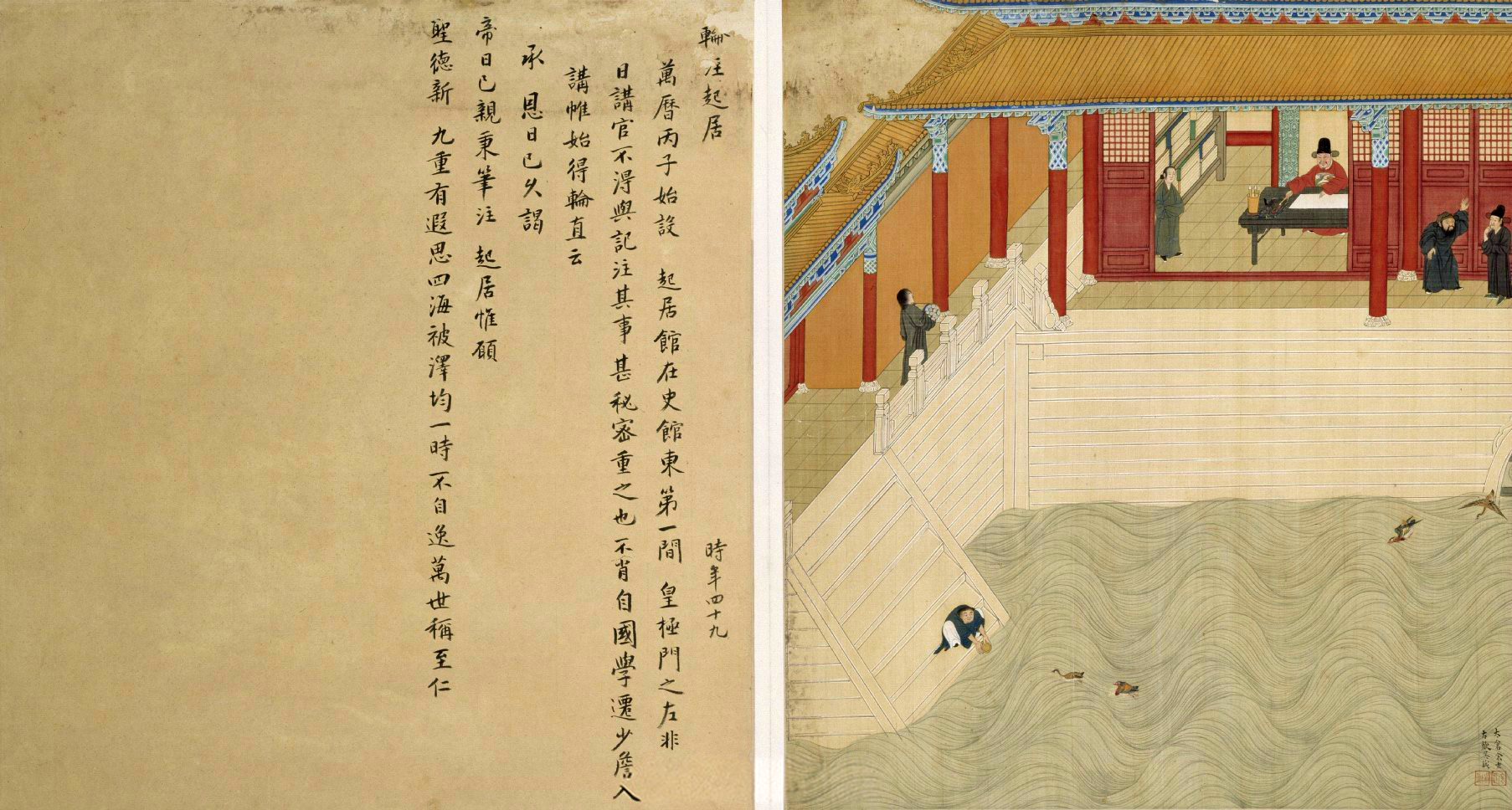
Xu's career No. 24 (輪注起居): at the age of 49

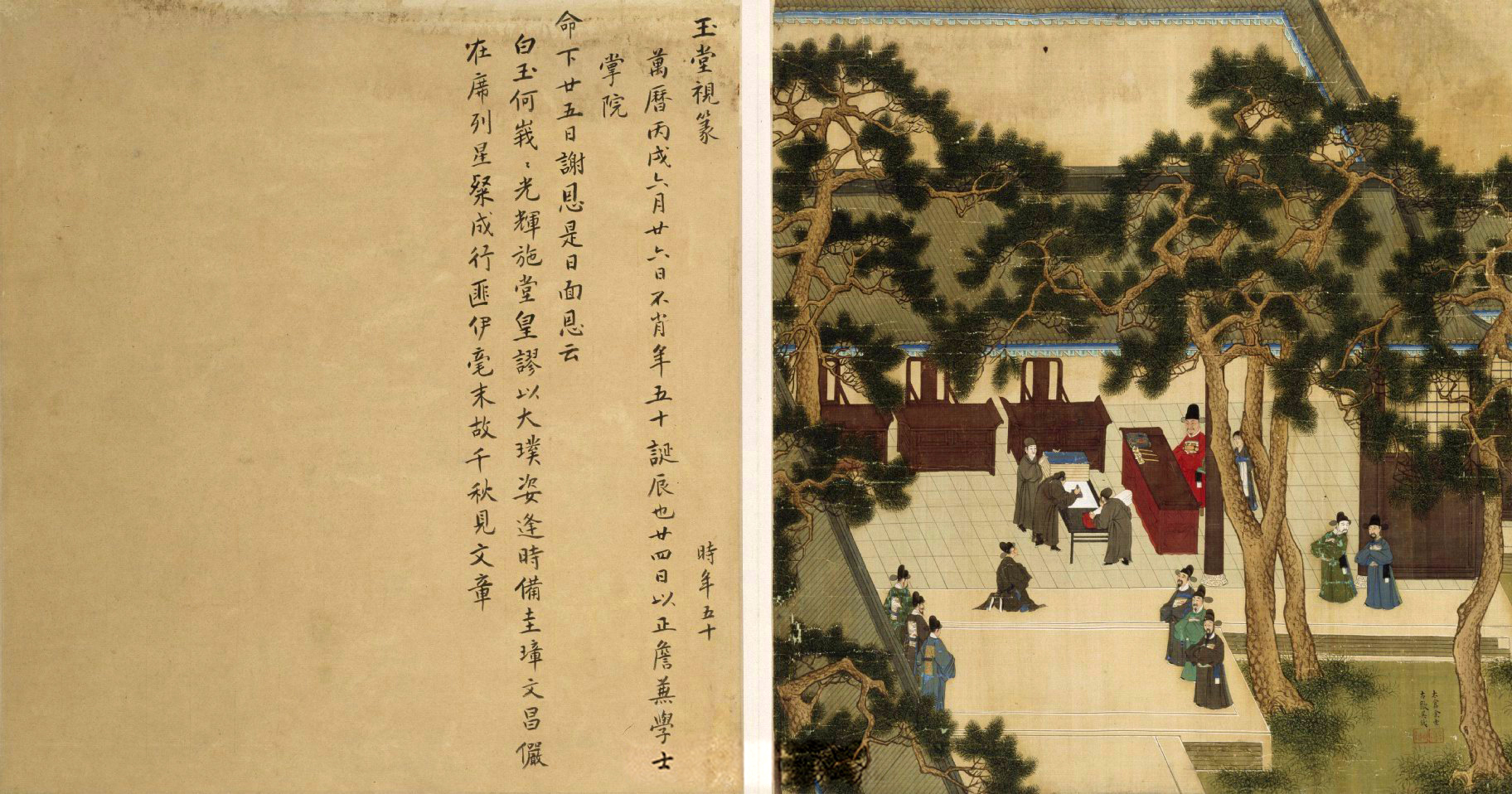
Xu's career No. 25 (玉堂視篆): As the chief of Hanlin Academy at the age of 50

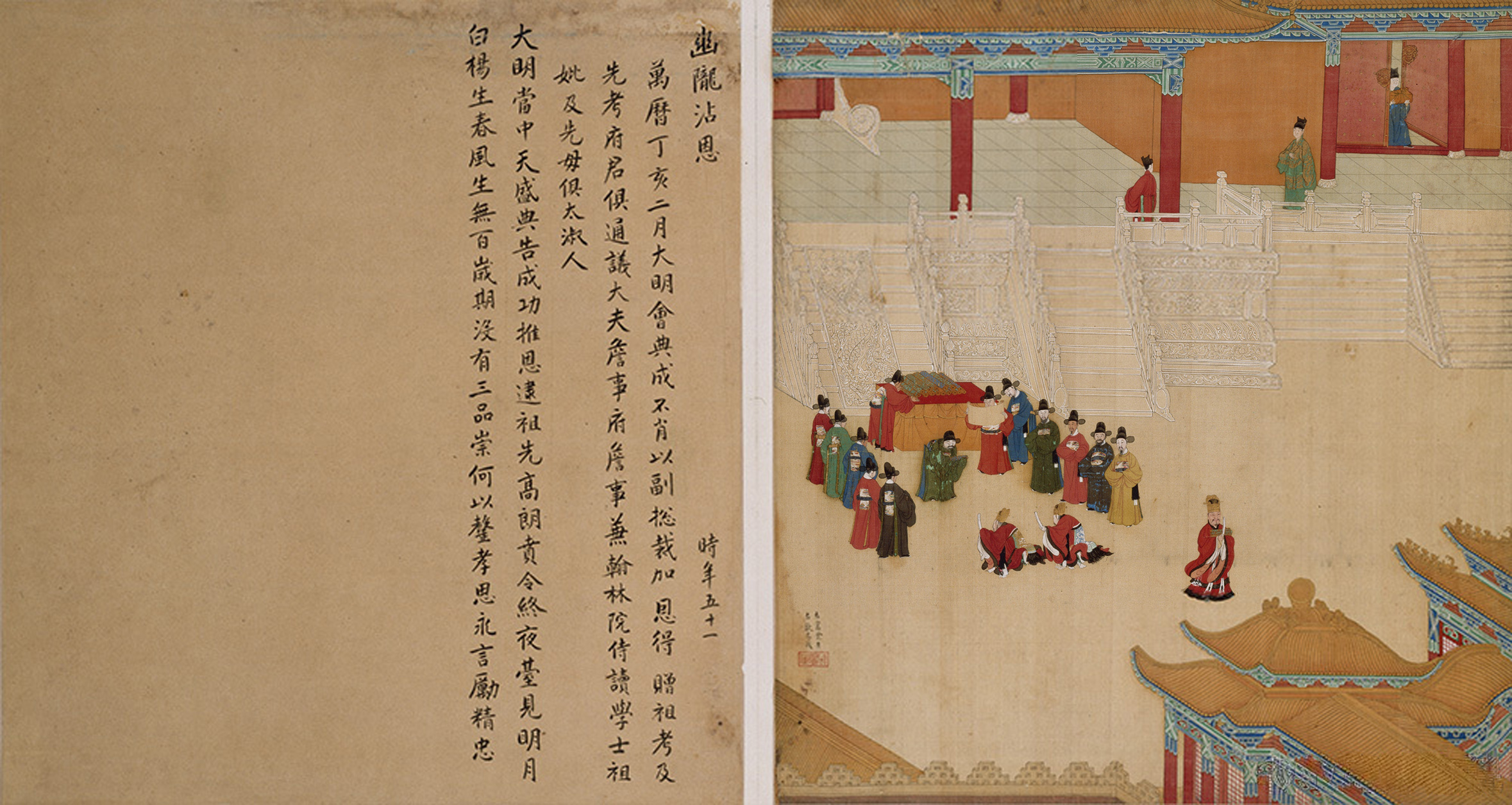
Xu's career No. 26 (幽隴沾恩): at the age of 51
