= Chen (surname) =

- Chen surname in regular script
- Romanization: Chen (Mandarin); Chan (Cantonese); Tan (Hokkien, Teochew); Tang (Teochew); Chin (Taishanese, Hakka, Japanese); Zen (Wu); Ding (Eastern Min, Gan); Ting (Eastern Min); Jin, Chin (Korean); Trần (Vietnamese); Taing (Khmer)
- Pronunciation: Chén (Pinyin); Chern (Gwoyeu Romatzyh); Tân (Pe̍h-ōe-jī); Can4 (Cantonese Jyutping); Chàhn (Cantonese Yale)
- Language: Chinese (Mandarin, Cantonese, Teochew, Hokkien)

Origin
- Language: Old Chinese
- Origin: Emperor Shun; Chen Hu Gong; Chen (state)
- Derivation: Gui (ancestral surname)

Other names
- Derivatives: Trần (Vietnamese); Jin (Korean name); Sae-Tang, Sae-Chen, Sae-Chin, Sae-Tan (Thai); Chandra, Dananjaya, Hartanto, Intan, Tanadi, Tandi, Tanoto, Tansil (Indonesian)

Chen ([ʈʂʰə̌n]) is a common Chinese-language surname 陳 or 陈, and one of the most common surnames in Asia.

It is the most common surname in Taiwan (2010) and Singapore (2000).

Chen is also the most common family name in Guangdong, Zhejiang, Fujian, Macau, and Hong Kong. It is the most common surname in Xiamen, the ancestral hometown of many overseas Hoklo.

Chen was listed 10th in the Hundred Family Surnames poem, in the verse 馮陳褚衛 (Féng Chén Chǔ Wèi).

In Cantonese, it is usually romanized as Chan (e.g., Jackie Chan), most widely used by those from Hong Kong, and also found in Macau and Singapore. It is also sometimes spelled Chun. The spelling Tan usually comes from Southern Min dialects (e.g., Hokkien), while some Teochew dialect speakers use the spelling Tang. In Hakka and Taishanese, the name is spelled Chin. Spellings based on Wu include Zen and Tchen. There are many spellings based on its Hainanese pronunciations, including Dan, Seng, and Sin.

In Vietnam, this surname is read as Trần and is 2nd most common. In Thailand, this surname is the most common surname of Thai Chinese and is often pronounced according to Teochew dialect as Tang. In Cambodia, this surname is transliterated as Taing. In Japanese, the surname is transliterated Chin (ちん). In Korean it is transliterated Jin or Chin (진).

In Indonesia, many Chinese Indonesians who originally had this surname adopted the Indonesian surname Chandra, Hartanto, and other surnames with the prefix Tan.

Chen is 5th most common surname in mainland China, but 4th most common in the world due to the larger overseas population. With all its various spellings and pronunciations, there are around 80–100 million people surnamed 陳/陈 worldwide.

The surname Cheng (程) is sometimes romanized as Chen (e.g., John S. Chen). Another less common Chinese surname 諶/谌 (Shen) can also be romanized as Chen.

== Character ==
As well as being a surname, the Chinese character 陳=陈 can also mean 'to describe' or 'ancient'. It is a combination of the radical 阝 and the phonetic component 東/东, meaning east.

== History ==
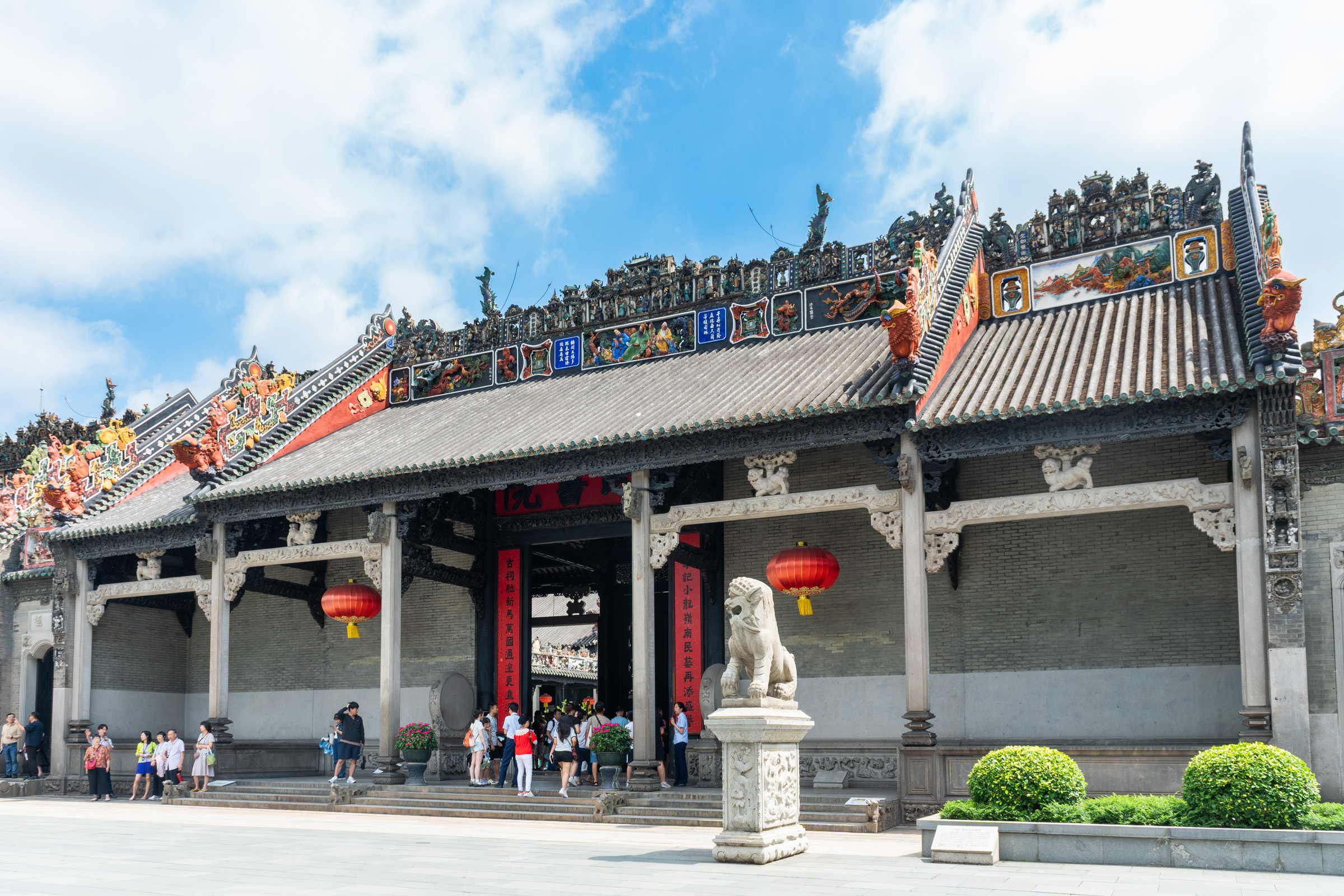
The Chen Clan Academy in Guangzhou, China

Chen descends from the legendary sage king Emperor Shun from around 2200 BC via the surname Gui (媯).

A millennium after Emperor Shun, when King Wu of Zhou established the Zhou dynasty (c. 1046 BC), he enfeoffed his son-in-law Gui Man, also known as Duke Hu of Chen or Chen Hugong. Chen Hugong, a descendant of Emperor Shun, found the State of Chen in modern Huaiyang County, Henan Province. In 479 BC, Chen was absorbed by Chu and became the Chu capital. The people of Chen adopted the name of their former state as their surname.

At the end of the Qin dynasty, Chen Sheng initiated the Chen Sheng Wu Guang uprising that overthrew the Qin and paved the way for the Han dynasty, one of China's golden ages.

During the Northern and Southern dynasties period (420–589), Chen Baxian established the Chen dynasty (557–589), the fourth and the last of the Southern dynasties, which was eventually absorbed by the Sui dynasty.

During this period, the nomadic Xianbei people had systematically assimilated into China's agrarian culture and adopted Han Chinese surnames under the state directives of Emperor Xiaowen of Northern Wei. The Xianbei subjects whose surname of "侯莫陳" (Hóumòchén) were converted to "陳" (Chen).

Some descendants of Chen migrated to Vietnam (Dai Viet) and established the Trần dynasty, a golden age in Vietnam. Their original home was Fujian, and they migrated under Trần Kinh (陳京 Chén Jīng). Trần Thái Tông (陈太宗 Chen Taizong) became the founding emperor of the Tran dynasty, and his descendants would rule Vietnam for more than a century, expanding Vietnam's territory and promoting developments in language, chu nom, culture, and art. Certain members of the clan could still speak Chinese, like when a Yuan dynasty envoy had a meeting with the Chinese-speaking Tran Prince Trần Quốc Tuấn in 1282.

During the Yuan–Ming transition, Chen Youliang founded the Chen Han dynasty, which helped overthrow Yuan rule and pave the way for the Ming dynasty.

In the 20th century, Chen Duxiu cofounded the Chinese Communist Party and became its first general secretary, but was eventually expelled from the party and condemned by Mao due to advocating Trotskyism.

== Distribution ==
Chen is the 5th most common surname in mainland China (around 70 million) and 4th most common in the world (around 80–100 million, including all its variants like Chan, Tan, Tran).

A 2013 study found that it was the 5th most common surname, shared by 61,300,000 people or 4.610% of the population, with the province with the most being Guangdong.

According to 2018 census, it was 5th most common in mainland China at around 63 million, but 4th most common surname in the world with 80–100 million people. It is the most common Chinese surname overseas.

In 2019 Chen was again the fifth most common surname in mainland China. It is the most common surname in the southern provinces of Zhejiang, Fujian, and Guangdong.

Hong Kong has around 700,000 using the spelling "Chan" and 61,000 using the spelling "Chen", so in total around 700,000–800,000 Chen (陈), which ranks first in Hong Kong.

In Thailand, last names are more unique therefore the Chinese last name Chen ranks 2nd with 88,000 and with an incidence of 1 to 900.

There are 187,000 Chens in the US, as of 2014. It is the 30th most common last name in California where there are 70,000. 11,300 in Texas, 6,800 Illinois, 5,900 Maryland. New Jersey was undercounted with data missing; New York had 5,400.

In Canada there are 32,900 Chens; 16,600 Ontario and 11,000 British Columbia.

Chen is usually one of the top 5 common Asian last names and top 3 most common Chinese in the US.

== Other pronunciations and transliteration ==
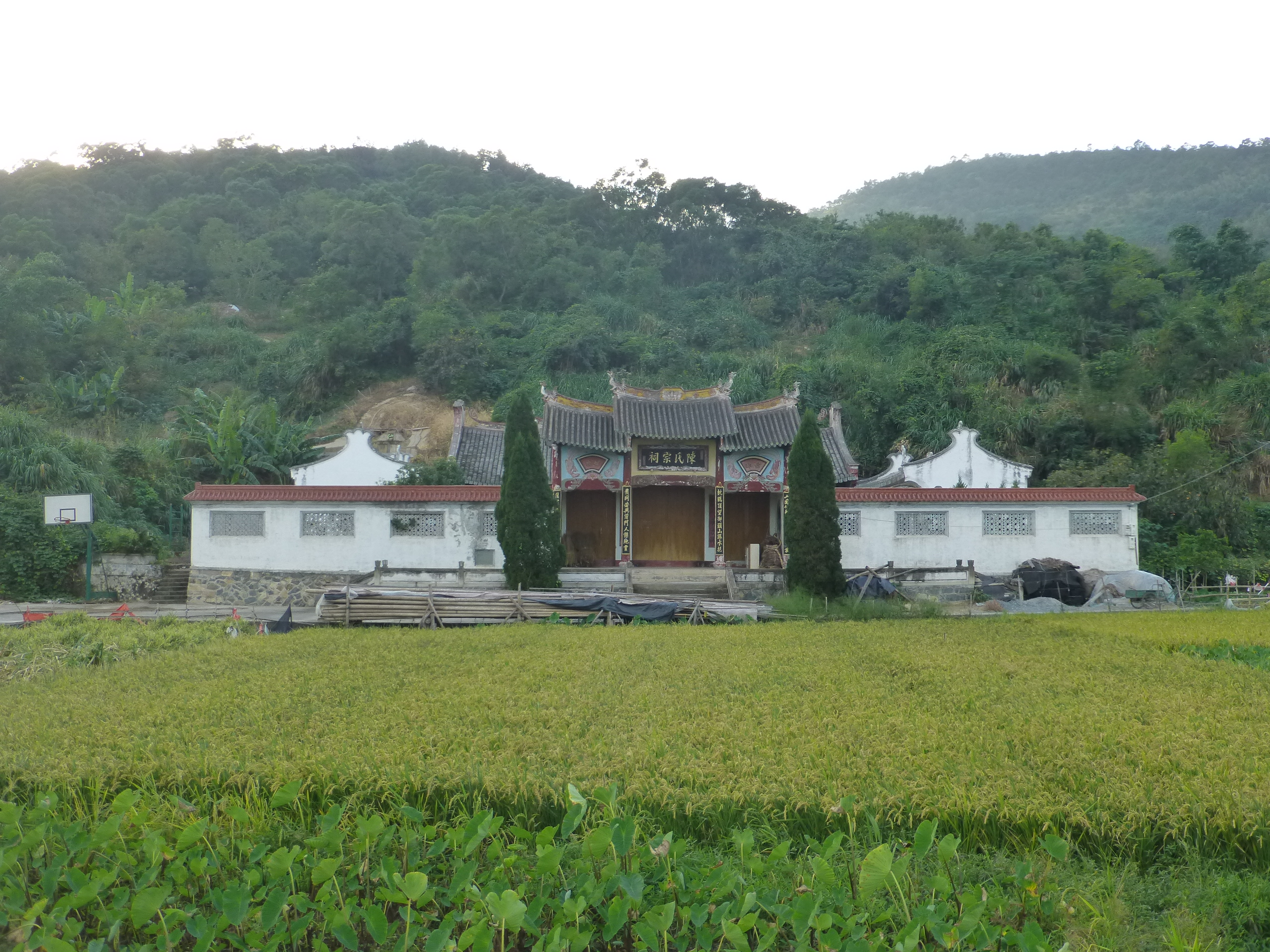
Chen family ancestral temple, in Xiazai Village, Cangnan County, Zhejiang

- Chen, used in Mandarin
- Dan, used in Thailand
- Chan, used in Cantonese in Hong Kong, Macao, Thailand, Singapore, Malaysia, and Philippines
- Chin, used in Hakka in Singapore and Malaysia and Taishanese in America, and Japanese
- Gin, used in Taishanese
- Jin, used in Korean
- Tan, used in Hokkien, Teochew and Hainanese in Singapore, Malaysia, Indonesia, Philippines, and Thailand
- Tang or Taing, used in Teochew in Cambodia and Thailand. Occasionally in Singapore and Malaysia.
- Ting or Ding, used in Fuzhou
- Trần, Sấn used in Vietnamese
- Zen, used in Shanghainese
- Sen, used as an alternative spelling in Limbu, Limbuwan

== Notable people surnamed 陳 / 陈 ==
This list includes Chen, Chan, Chin, Tran, Tan, Tang and other common spellings of 陈

=== Historical figures ===
- Chen Baxian (陳霸先), also known as Emperor Wu of Chen (陳武帝), founding emperor of the Chen dynasty during the Northern and Southern dynasties period
- Chen Biao (陳表), military general of Eastern Wu during the Three Kingdoms period
- Chen Bozong (陳伯宗), also known as Emperor Fei of Chen (陳廢帝), third emperor of the Chen dynasty
- Chen Cheng (陳誠), Ming diplomat known for his overland journeys into Central Asia
- Chen Dao (陳到), military general of Shu Han during the Three Kingdoms period
- Chen De'an (陳德安), also known Śramaṇa Zhiyi (沙門智顗), fourth patriarch of the Tiantai school in Chinese Buddhism
- Chen Deng (陳登; 204–237), military general and politician of the late Eastern Han dynasty
- Chen Di (陳第), Ming philologist, strategist, and traveler
- Chen Gong (陳宮), advisor to the warlord Lu Bu during the late Eastern Han dynasty
- Chen Hongmou (陳宏謀; 1696–1771), Qing official, scholar and philosopher, widely regarded as a model official of the Qing dynasty.
- Chen Huacheng (陳化成; 1776–1842), Jiangnan admiral, the highest rank in the Qing Imperial Navy and was regarded as a national hero
- Chen Hugong (陳胡公), also known as Duke Hu of Chen, founder for the State of Chen (陳國) during the Zhou dynasty
- Chen Hui / Chen Yi (陳禕; 602–664), also known as Master Xuanzang (玄奘法師), Buddhist monk, scholar, traveller, and translator, known for his epoch-making contributions to Chinese Buddhism and the travelogue of his journey to India during the Tang dynasty period
- Chen Jiao (陳嬌), Empress Chen of Wu (孝武陳皇后) and the first wife of Emperor Wu of Han
- Chen Li (陳澧; 1810–1882), Qing scholar of the evidential research school, known for his contributions to historical Chinese phonology
- Chen Li (陳理), second and last emperor of Chen Han in late Yuan dynasty, and founded Yangsan Jin clan in Korea
- Chen Lin (陳璘), Ming general and navy admiral, commander-in-chief of the Battle of Noryang and led Ming Navy to win the Imjin War, founder of Gwangdong Jin clan in Korea
- Chen Lin (陳琳), Eastern Han official, scholar and poet, one of the "Seven Scholars of Jian'an"
- Chen Menglei (陳夢雷), Qing scholar-writer, also the chief editor and compiler of the Complete Classics Collection of Ancient China
- Chen Ping (陳平), chancellor of the early Western Han dynasty and adviser of Emperor Gaozu of Han
- Chen Qun (陳群), official of Cao Wei during Three Kingdoms period and initiated the nine-rank system for civil service nomination
- Chen Tanqian (陳昙蒨), Emperor Wen of Chen (陳文帝), second emperor of the Chen dynasty
- Chen Sheng (陳勝), leader of the Chen Sheng Wu Guang uprising, the first uprising against the Qin dynasty
- Chen Shi (陳式), military general of Shu Han during the Three Kingdoms period
- Chen Shou (陳壽; 233–297), historian and author in the early Jin dynasty, best known for his historical text Records of the Three Kingdoms (三國志)
- Chen Shubao (陳叔寶), also known as Houzhu of Chen (陳後主), fifth and last emperor of the Chen dynasty
- Chen Shuda (陳叔達), imperial prince of the Chen dynasty and chancellor of the Tang dynasty
- Chen Tai (陳泰), military general and official of Cao Wei during the Three Kingdoms period
- Chen Tang (general) (陳湯), military general of the Western Han dynasty, famous during the Han–Xiongnu War
- Chen Tianbao (陳添保), former fisherman turned navy commander of the Tay Son dynasty in Vietnam
- Chen Tuan (陳摶), regarded as a Taoist Immortal, who created and used sleeping qigong methods of internal alchemical cultivation, and also a grand martial artist who created the Liuhebafa technique
- Chen Wangting (陳王庭;1580–1660), commander of the Wen County garrison during the late Ming dynasty, who founded Chen-style tai chi
- Chen Weisong (陳维崧; 1626–1682), first of the great Ci and Pianwen poets during the Qing dynasty, leader and founder of the Yangxian poetry school
- Chen Wenlong (陳文龍; 1232–1277), scholarly general during the final years of the Southern Song dynasty, was later deified as City God of Fuzhou and Putian during the Ming dynasty
- Chen Wu (陳武), military general who served under the warlord Sun Ce and Sun Quan during the late Eastern Han dynasty
- Chen Xu (陳頊), Emperor Xuan of Chen (陳宣帝), fourth emperor of the Chen dynasty
- Chen Yan (陳巖), governor (观察使) of the Fujian Circuit during the late Tang dynasty
- Chen Youliang (陳友諒), founding emperor of Chen Han in the late Yuan dynasty
- Chen Yuanyuan (陳圓圓), leading figure in the Suzhou kunqu and concubine of Wu Sangui
- Chen Zhaoyin (陳昭應; 1047–1101), also known as Master Qingshui (清水祖師), Chan Buddhist monk during the Northern Song from Anxi County of Quanzhou and was worshipped as a deity in Southern Fujian region and among Chinese diaspora communities
- Chen Zi'ang (陳子昂), prominent poet and important advisor to the Empress Wu Zetian of the Tang dynasty, well known for his collection of thirty-eight poems "Ganyu" (感遇)
- Chen Zhen (陳震), Minister of the Guards (衛尉) in Shu Han during Three Kingdoms period
- Chen Zheng (陳政; 616–677), military general of the Tang dynasty
- Empress Chen / Empress Xiaojiesu (孝潔肅皇后), first empress to the Jiajing Emperor of the Ming dynasty
- Tan Goan-kong (陳元光; 657–711), Tang military general and official who was honoured as the "Sacred Duke, founder of Zhangzhou"
- Trần Cảnh (陳煚; 1218–1277), also known as Trần Thái Tông (陳太宗), first emperor of the Trần dynasty and reigned Đại Việt (1226–1258)
- Trần Ngỗi (陳頠; 1375–1410), also known as Giản Định Đế (簡定帝), founder and emperor of the Later Trần dynasty
- Trần Quốc Tuấn (陳國峻; 1228–1300), royal prince, statesman and military commander during the Trần dynasty, managed to repelled two major Mongol invasions in the late 13th century, worshipped and revered as national hero
- Trần Thừa (陳承; 1184–1234), head of the Trần clan and high-ranking mandarin during the Lý dynasty
- Trần Thủ Độ (陳守度; 1194–1264), Grand Chancellor and Regent of the Emperor during the Trần dynasty

=== Dynasties and states ===
- Rulers of Chen (state) during the Zhou dynasty period (陳國), where Taoism originated
- Rulers of the Chen dynasty during the Northern and Southern dynasties period (陳朝)
- Rulers of Chen Han during the late Yuan dynasty period (陳漢)
- Rulers of the Trần dynasty that ruled over Đại Việt (also known as 陳朝)
- Rulers of the Later Trần dynasty that ruled over Đại Việt (後陳朝)

=== Modern figures ===
Note: this list is primarily ordered by spelling of the surname, secondarily ordered by given name commonly used in English, regardless of name order.

==== Arts and Entertainment ====
- Adia Chan (陳松伶; born 1971), Hong Kong singer and model
- Agnes Chan (born 1955), Hong Kong singer and UNICEF Goodwill Ambassador
- Daniel Chan Hiu-tung (陳曉東; born 1975), Hong Kong singer, songwriter and actor
- Danny Chan Pak-Keung (陳百強; 1958–1993), Hong Kong actor, singer and composer
- Eason Chan Yick Shun (陳奕迅; born 1974), Hong Kong actor and singer
- Frankie Chan Fan-kei (陳勳奇; born 1951), Hong Kong martial arts actor, director, producer and composer
- Isabel Chan (陳逸寧; born 1979), Chinese actress based in Hong Kong
- Jordan Chan Siu-Chun (陳小春; born 1967), Hong Kong actor and singer
- Kim Chan (陳錦湘; 1917–2008), Chinese-American actor and producer
- Kit Chan (陳潔儀; born 1972), Singaporean singer-songwriter
- Monica Chan Fat-yung (陳法蓉; born 1966), Hong Kong actress and model
- Moses Chan Ho (陳豪; born 1971), Hong Kong actor and model
- Priscilla Chan Wai-han (陳慧嫻; born 1965), Hong Kong singer
- Ruco Chan Chin-pang (陳展鵬; born 1977), Hong Kong actor and singer
- Vincy Chan (陳家欣; born 1982), Hong Kong-Singaporean Cantopop singer
- William Chan Wai-ting (陳偉霆; born 1985), Hong Kong singer, dancer and actor
- Andie Chen (陳邦鋆; born 1985), Singaporean actor
- Andy Chen Yi (陳奕; born 1986), Taiwanese singer and actor
- Anthony Chen (陳哲藝; born 1984), Singaporean film director, screenwriter and film producer
- Arthur Chen (陈飞宇; born 2000), American-Chinese actor and model
- Chen Bolin / Wilson Chen (陳柏霖; born 1983), Taiwanese actor
- Cheer Chen Chi-chen (陳綺貞; born 1975), Taiwanese singer and songwriter
- Chen Chusheng (陳楚生; born 1981), Chinese actor and singer
- CIL Chen (born 1963), Chinese artist and writer
- Chen Diexian (陈蝶仙, 1879–1940), Chinese writer, poet, and industrialist
- Chen Dingshan (陈定山, 1897–1987), Chinese writer, painter, and calligrapher
- Chen Duling (陳都靈; born 1993), Chinese actress
- Corrie Chen, Taiwanese-Australian filmmaker, writer and director
- Eddy Chen (陳韋丞; born 1993), Australian musician and YouTuber of the musical duo TwoSet Violin
- Edison Chen Koon-hei (陳冠希; born 1980), Canadian-born Hong Kong actor, singer, rapper, fashion designer and entrepreneur
- Edmund Chen (陳之財; born 1961), Singaporean actor
- Edward Chen, (陳昊森; born 1996), Taiwanese actor and singer
- Fala Chen (陳法拉; born 1982), Hong Kong-born American actress and singer
- H. T. Chen (1947–2022), American dancer and choreographer
- Chen Hao (陳好; born 1979), Chinese actress, singer, and model
- Chen Hanwei (陈汉玮; born 1969), Singaporean-Malaysian actor
- Chen He (陈赫; born 1985), Chinese actor
- Chen Hong (陳紅; born 1968), Chinese actress and film producer
- Ian Chen (born 2006), American actor
- Chen Jianbin (陳建斌; born 1970), Chinese actor
- Chen Jiebing (陳潔冰), Chinese-American musician who specialises in erhu
- Chen Jin (陳瑾), Chinese actress
- Jirayu Tangsrisuk (born 1993), Thai actor, singer and model
- Joan Chen (陳冲; born 1961), Chinese-American actress and film director
- Joyce Chen (1917–1994), Chinese-American chef, author and television personality
- Julie Chen (陳曉怡; born 1970), American television personality, news anchor and producer
- Chen Kaige (陳凱歌; born 1952), film director
- Kanok Ratwongsakul (born 1963), well-known journalist, Senior Vice President of the Nation Multimedia Group
- Kawee Tanjararak (born 1980), Thai singer and actor
- Kelly Chen Wai-lam (陳慧琳; born 1972), Hong Kong actress and singer
- Chen Kenichi (陳建一; 1956–2023), Japanese chef and television personality
- Chen Kenmin (陳建民; 1912–1990), Prominent Chinese chef in Japan, father of Chen Kenichi
- Chen Linong (born 2000), Taiwanese singer and actor, former member of Nine Percent
- Chen Liping (born 1965), Singaporean actress
- Chen Mei-Ann (陳美安; born 1973), American orchestra conductor and musician
- Chen Neng-chuan (陳能釧), Taiwanese YouTuber
- Chen Qiufan (born 1981), science fiction writer, columnist, and scriptwriter
- Robert Chen (陳慕融; born 1969), Taiwanese-born violinist and Concertmaster of the Chicago Symphony Orchestra
- Shaun Chen Hongyu (陳泓宇; born 1978), former Malaysian national badminton player and actor based in Singapore
- Chen Shi-Zheng (陳士爭), New York-based theater and film director
- Chen Shucheng (陳澍城; born 1949), Singaporean actor
- Chen Sicheng (陳思誠; born 1978), actor, director and screenwriter
- Chen Sisi (陳思思; 1938–2007), born Chen Limei (陳麗梅), Chinese film and theater actress
- Terry Chen (born 1975), Canadian film and television actor
- Chen Tianwen (born 1963), Singaporean actor
- Chen Wen Hsi (陳文希; 1906–1991), Singaporean artist, known for his avant-garde Chinese paintings
- Chen Xiao, actor and model
- Chen Xiaoxu (陳曉旭; 1965–2007), former actress who ordained as Bhikkhuni in Baiguoxinglong Temple (百国兴隆寺) monastic name Miao Zhen (妙真)
- Chen Xinghan (陳星漢), video game designer and co-founder of Thatgamecompany
- Chen Xinhai (陈鑫海; born 2001), Chinese actor
- Chen Yanran (陈嫣冉; born 2005), Chinese illustrator
- Chen Yi (陳怡; born 1953), Chinese-American violinist and composer of contemporary classical music
- Chen Yumei (陳玉梅; 1910–1985), Chinese film actress and singer
- Chen Yunshang (陳雲裳; 1919–2016), Chinese film actress and singer
- Chen Yuqi (also known as Yukee Chen, born 1992), Chinese actress
- Chen Zaiyan (born 1971), artist in the Yangjiang Group collective
- Chen Zhi (陳志), Professor of classical guitar at the Central Conservatory of Music
- Felicia Chin (陈凤玲; born 1984), also went on her stage name 陈靓瑄, Singaporean actress
- Marcus Chin (陈建彬; born 1953), Singaporean host, actor and singer
- Vincent "Randy" Chin (1937–2003), Jamaican record producer and label owner, founder of VP Records
- Tan Ban Eng Melvyn (陳萬榮; born 1956), Singapore-born British classical pianist, noted for his study of historical performance practice
- Tan Boen Soan (陳文宣; 1905–1952), Indonesian writer and journalist
- Tan Boon Wah (陳文華; born 1975), Singaporean songwriter and practicing real estate lawyer
- Tan Chui Mui (陳翠梅; born 1978), Malaysian filmmaker
- Denise Camillia Tan (陈楚寰; born 1992), Singapore actress and model
- Tan Gin Ho (1880–1941), Indonesian writer and scion of the influential Tan family of Cirebon
- Hanjin Tan (陳奐仁; born 1976), Singaporean-Hong Kong singer-songwriter
- Tan Khoen Swie (陳坤瑞; 1883/1894–1953), Indonesian publisher
- Tan Pin Pin (陳彬彬; born 1969), Singapore-based film director
- Tan Swie Hian (陳瑞獻; born 1943), Singaporean multidisciplinary artist known for his contemporary Chinese calligraphy, Chinese poetry and contemporary art sculptures
- Tan Teng-pho (陳澄波; 1895–1947), Taiwanese oil painter
- Tan Tjoei Hock (1908–1984), Indonesian journalist and filmmaker
- Tan Twan Eng (陳團英), Malaysian novelist
- Julie Tan (陈欣淇; born 1992), Malaysian born Singaporean actress and model
- Romeo Tan (陈罗密欧; born 1985), Singaporean actor
- Royston Tan (陳子謙; born 1976), Singaporean filmmaker, director, screenwriter, producer and actor
- Sandi Tan (陳善治; born 1972), Singaporean filmmaker and critic

==== Politicians, military and civil servants ====
- Andy Chan Ho-tin (陳浩天; born 1990), Hong Kong political activist
- Angela Tanoesoedibjo (born 1987), Indonesian businesswoman and Deputy Minister of Tourism and Creative Economy
- Bert Chen, Canadian politician
- Ceajer "KC" Chan Ka-keung (陳家強; born 1957), former Secretary for Financial Services and the Treasury in Hong Kong
- Cheryl Chan Wei Ling (陳慧玲; born 1976), Singaporean politician and businesswoman
- Chan Choy Siong (陳翠嫦; 1931–1981), Singaporean politician and activist for women's rights in Singapore
- Chan Chun Seng (陈振声; born 1969), Singapore politician and former Chief of Army
- Frank Chan Fan (陳帆; born 1958), former Secretary for Transport and Housing in Hong Kong
- Sophia Chan Siu-chee (陳肇始; born 1958), former Secretary for Food and Health in Hong Kong
- Chan Sek Keong (陈锡强; born 1937), Singapore's third Chief Justice of Singapore (2006–2012)
- Chan Seng Onn (陳成安; born 1954), Singaporean judge, served as High Court judge since 2007
- Chan Siu-bak (陳少白; 1869–1934), Chinese revolutionary who was one of the four bandits, Sun Yat-sen being one of them
- José Antonio Chang (born 19 May 1958), former Prime Minister of Peru
- Anutin Charnvirakul (陳錫堯; born 1966), Prime Minister of Thailand
- Chavarat Charnvirakul (陳景鎮; born 1936), former Acting Prime Minister of Thailand
- Apollo Chen (陳學聖; born 1957), Taiwanese legislator
- Arthur Y. Chen (陳豫), Minister of Public Construction Commission of the Republic of China (1995–1996)
- Chen Cheng (陳誠; 1897–1965), Chinese politician and general, Vice President and Premier of the Republic of China
- Chen Chi-chung (陳吉仲; born 1966), Minister of Council of Agriculture of the Republic of China, distinguished professor at National Chung Hsing University (2008–2016)
- Chen Chien-jen, (陳建仁; born 1951) Former Vice President of the Republic of China (Taiwan)
- Chen In-chin (陳英鈐), Taiwanese politician, Chairperson of Central Election Commission of the Republic of China (2017–2018)
- Chen Chih-ching (陳志清; born 1952), Taiwanese politician, Minister of Council of Agriculture of the Republic of China (2016)
- Chen Zhenggao (陈政高; 1952–2024), Chinese politician.
- Chen Chih-Ping (陳質平; 1906–1984), Diplomat for the Republic of China from 1920s through mid-1970s
- Chen Chin-jun (陳景峻; born 1956), Taiwanese politician, Secretary-General of the Executive Yuan (2007–2008)
- Chen Deming, former president of Association for Relations Across the Taiwan Straits of the People's Republic of China
- Doreen Chen, former Jamaican politician
- Chen Duxiu (陳獨秀; 1879–1942), co-founder of the Chinese Communist Party and its first general secretary, leader of China's Trotskyist movement
- Edward Chen, (陳坤耀; born 1945), Hong Kong economist and politician, President of Lingnan University (1995–2007)
- Edward M. Chen (born 1953), American federal judge
- Chen Fu-hai (陳福海; born 1963), Magistrate of Kinmen County, Taiwan (2014–2018)
- Chen Geng, PLA senior general
- Chen Guangcheng (born 1971), Chinese civil rights activist in PRC
- Chen Guangyi, PRC politician and former governor of Gansu
- Chen Guofu (陳果夫; 1892–1951), Chinese politician in the Republic of China, Governor of Jiangsu Province (1933–1937)
- Chen Hsiung-wen (陳雄文; born 1954), Minister of Labor of the Republic of China (2014–2016)
- Chen Hsueh-sheng (陳雪生; born 1952), Magistrate of Lienchiang County, Taiwan (2001–2009)
- Chen Jinn-lih (陳進利), Vice President of Control Yuan (2008–2014)
- Chen Jiongming (陳炯明; 1878–1933), Hailufeng Hokkien revolutionary figure in the early period of the Republic of China
- Joseph Zen Ze-kiun (born 1931), Roman Catholic cardinal and former Bishop of Hong Kong
- Katrina Chen (陳葦蓁; born 1983), Canadian politician
- Chen Kuang-fu (陳光復; born 1955), Magistrate of Penghu County, Taiwan (2014–2018)
- Chen Lanhee (陳仁宜; born 1978), American policy advisor, attorney, and academic
- Chen Lifu (陳立夫; 1900–2001), Chinese politician and anti-communist of the Republic of China, Minister of Education (1938–1944)
- Chen Mingren (陳明仁; 1903–1974), First Corps Commander and the provincial chairman of the Hunan Provincial Government during ROC period, later became one of the founding members of PLA during the PRC period
- Chen Qiyou (陈其尤, 1892–1970), chairman of the China Zhi Gong Party
- Shaun Chen (politician) (陳聖源; born 1980), Canadian politician
- Chen Show Mao (陳碩茂; born 1961), former Member of Parliament in Singapore, Rhodes Scholar and retired lawyer and politician
- Chen Shui-bian (陳水扁; born 1950), President of the Republic of China (2000–2008)
- Chen Shui-tsai (陳水在; born 1948), First Magistrate of Kinmen County (1993–2001)
- Chen Shyh-kwei (陳士魁; born 1952), Minister of the Overseas Community Affairs Council of the Executive Yuan in Taiwan (2013–2016)
- Surachai Danwattananusorn (陳嘉前; born 1942), Thai political activist
- Chen Tanqiu (陳潭秋; 1896–1943), founding member of Chinese Communist Party
- Chen Tianhua (陳天華), Chinese revolutionary who helped Sun Yat-sen found the Tongmenghui in 1905
- Chen Wei (born 1969), PRC dissident and human rights activist
- Chen Wei-zen (born 1953), Minister of the Interior in Taiwan (2014–2016)
- Chen Wen-hsien (born 1958), Taiwanese politician and television commentator
- Chen Yi (1883–1950), Chief Executive of Taiwan (Republic of China province)
- Chen Yi (1901–1972), Chinese communist military commander and politician, Mayor of Shanghai and Foreign Minister
- Chen Yonglin, former PRC diplomat who defected to Australia in 2005
- Chen Yuan (陳垣; 1880–1971), known as one of the "Four Greatest Historians" of Modern China
- Chen Yuh-chang (陳裕璋; born 1955), Chairperson of the Financial Supervisory Commission of the Executive Yuan (2010–2013)
- Chen Yun, PRC politician, in the 1980s and 1990s considered second most powerful leader after Deng Xiaoping
- Ming Chin (born 1942), Associate Justice of the California Supreme Court
- Chin Tet Yung (陈德镛), former Singaporean Member of Parliament
- Ding Kuong Hiing (陈冠勋; born 1955), former Malaysian politician
- Sin Boon Ann (陈文安), former Singaporean Member of Parliament
- Tan Boon Teik (陈文德; 1929–2012), former Attorney-General of Singapore
- Tan Cheng Bock (陳清木; born 1940), Singaporean politician and doctor
- Tan Cheng Han (陳清漢) Singaporean lawyer, senior counsel and legal academic, Dean of the City University of Hong Kong School of Law
- Tan Cheng Lock (陳禎祿; 1883–1960), founder of the Malayan Chinese Association
- Tan Chin Siong Sam (陳振泉; born 1958), Singaporean former politician
- Tan Chuan-Jin (陳川仁; born 1969 ), Singaporean former politician and former Brigadier-General of the Singapore Armed Forces
- Tan Chye Cheng (陈才清; 1911–1991), Singaporean lawyer and politician, Member of the Legislative Council (1948–1955)
- Tan Eng Goan (陳永元; 1802–1872), first Majoor der Chinezen ("Major of the Chinese") of Batavia (1837–1865)
- Tan Jee Say (陈如斯; born 1954), Singaporean politician and former civil servant
- Tan Joon Liang Josephus (陳俊良; born 1979), Singaporean criminal defense lawyer
- Tony Tan Keng Yam (陈庆炎; born 1940), Singaporean politician and former President of Singapore (2011–2017)
- Tan Kiat How (陳傑豪; born 1977), Singaporean politician and civil servant
- Tan Kim Ching (陳金鐘; 1829–1892), served as Kapitan China of the Chinese community, was also the consul for Japan, Siam and Russia, and was a member of the Royal Court of Siam
- Tan Kim Seng (陳金聲; 1805–1864), Chinese community leader (Hokkien) and first magistrate of Chinese descent in Singapore
- Tan Kok Wai (陳國偉; born 1957), Malaysia's Member of Parliament and National Chairman of the Democratic Action Party
- Tan Lee Meng (陳利明; born 1948), Senior Judge of the Supreme Court of Singapore (2015–2021)
- Tan Lian Hoe (陳蓮花; born 1958), former Malaysia's Member of Parliament
- Tan See Leng (陳詩龍; born 1964), Singaporean politician and former medical practitioner
- Tan Seng Giaw (陳勝堯; born 1942), former Malaysian Member of Parliament
- Tan Sheng Hui Alvin (陳聖辉; born 1980), Singaporean politician
- Tan Siew Sin (陳修信; 1916–1988), Malaysian longest-serving Minister of Finance and son of Tun Dato' Sir Tan Cheng Lock
- Tan Soo Khoon (陳樹群; 1949–2016), Singaporean former politician, Speaker of the Parliament (1989–2001)
- Tan Soon Neo Jessica (陳舜娘; born 1966), Singaporean politician
- Tan Tee Beng (陳智銘; born 1972), former Malaysian Member of Parliament
- Tan Wu Meng (陳有明; born 1975), Singaporean politician and oncologist
- Tin Pei Ling (陳佩玲; born 1983), Singaporean politician and businesswoman
- Sebastian Ting Chiew Yew (陈超耀), Malaysian politician
- Ting Chew Peh (陈祖排; born 1943), Malaysian politician

==== Military ====
- Arthur Chin (陳瑞鈿; 1913–1997), Chinese-American fighter ace in the Second Sino-Japanese War, recognized as the United States' first ace in World War II
- Tan Chong Tee (陳崇智; 1916–2012), Chinese resistance fighter based in Singapore and Malaya during World War II

==== Business and entrepreneurs ====
- Alexandre Chan (born 1942), Brazilian architect, was described as "one of Brazil's leading architects", best known for designing the President Juscelino Kubitschek Bridge and the Bridge of Knowledge
- Hary Tanoesoedibjo, Indonesian businessman, owner of MNC Asia Holding
- Priscilla Chan (born 1985), American philanthropist, former pediatrician, co-founder and CEO of Meta Platforms
- Chan Kin-man, One of the founders of the Occupy Central
- Chan Tseng-hsi (陳曾熙; 1923–1986), Hong Kong billionaire who founded Hang Lung Group, Harvard T.H. Chan School of Public Health named after him, sons Gerald Chan and Ronnie Chan
- Chen Changwen (陳長文; born 1944), chairman and CEO of Lee and Li, was formerly the secretary of Straits Exchange Foundation and the president of the Red Cross Society of the Republic of China
- Christine Chen (born 1968), American journalist, news anchor and CEO of Chen Communications
- Chen Danian (陈大年; born 1978), Chinese Internet entrepreneur, founder and CEO of LinkSure
- Chen Guangbiao, founder and chairman of Jiangsu Huangpu Renewable Resources Limited Company
- Chen Guangfu (陳光甫; 1880–1976), Shanghai-based Chinese banker and State Councillor, founder of the first modern Chinese savings bank
- Chen Jintao (陳錦濤; 1870–1939), chief financial officer and head of currency reform in the Republic of China, also founded Bank of China
- Katherine Chen Yi-Ning, Taiwanese communications official and professor
- Chen Pehong (陳丕宏; born 1957), Taiwanese-American businessman, chairman of the board, president and chief executive officer of BroadVision
- Roger H. Chen (born 1950s), Taiwanese-born American businessman, founder of the 99 Ranch Market supermarket chain
- Chen Rui (zh:陈睿), internet entrepreneur, billionaire, and CEO of Bilibili
- Shane Chen, Chinese-American inventor and entrepreneur (e.g. invented the self-balancing scooter)
- Steven Shih Chen (陳士駿; born 1978), Taiwanese-American Internet entrepreneur and co-founder of YouTube
- Steve Chen (陳世卿; born 1944), Taiwanese supercomputer designer and entrepreneur
- Chen Tianqiao, businessman
- Chen Xiang (born 1990), Chinese business executive and chef
- Chen Xiangming, sociologist, founding dean and director of urban and global studies and director of the Center for Urban and Global Studies at Trinity College in Hartford
- Chen Xiaohong, economist and serves as the Malcolm K. Brachman Professor of Economics at Yale University
- Chen Yuan, economist who served as the Chairman of the China Development Bank (1998–2013)
- Chin Sophonpanich (1908–1988), Thai entrepreneur who founded Bangkok Bank
- Chatri Sophonpanich (1934–2018), Thai businessman, son of Chin Sophonpanich
- Chartsiri Sophonpanich (1959), Thai banker, son of Chatri Sophonpanich, grandson of Chin Sophonpanich
- Chun Afong (陳芳; 1825–1906), Businessman and philanthropist
- Tan Boo Liat (陳武烈; 1875–1934), Singaporean businessman and philanthropist, great-grandson of Tan Tock Seng
- Tan Caktiong Tony (陳覺中; born 1953), Filipino billionaire businessman, founder and chairman of Jollibee Foods Corporation
- Tan Chay Yan (陳齊賢; 1870–1916), Malaysian Peranakan Chinese rubber plantation merchant and philanthropist, grandson of Tan Tock Seng
- Tan Chee Yioun Vincent (陳志遠; born 1952), Malaysian businessman, investor and the founder of Berjaya Corporation Berhad
- Tan Chin Hwee (陳競輝; born 1971), Singaporean businessman and professor, Asia-Pacific chief executive officer of Trafigura
- Tan Chin Tuan (陳振傳; 1908–2005) Singaporean Peranakan banker and philanthropist
- Tan Hiok Nee (陳旭年; 1827–1902), Major China of Johor and leader of Ngee Heng Kongsi
- Tan Hock Eng (陳福陽; born 1952), Malaysian business executive, philanthropist and the CEO of Broadcom Inc.
- Tan Jiak Kim (陳若錦; 1859–1917), Singapore Peranakan merchant, political activist, philanthropist and co-founder of the Straits Chinese British Association
- Tan Kah Kee (陳嘉庚; 1874–1961), Chinese businessman, community leader and philanthropist in Singapore and China
- Tan Kee Soon (陳開順; 1803–1857), first Kangchu and Kapitan China of Tebrau, leader of Ngee Heng Kongsi and Anti-Qing fighter
- Tan Keong Choon (陳共存; 1916–2015) Singapore industrialist, community leader and philanthropist
- Tan Keong Saik (陳恭錫; 1850–1909), Singaporean businessman
- Tan Kin Lian (陈钦亮; born 1948), Singaporean businessman
- Tan Koon Swan (陳群川; born 1940), Fifth president of the Malaysian Chinese Association
- Tan Lark Sye (陳六使; 1897–1972), Singaporean businessman and philanthropist, founded Nanyang University in the 1950s
- Tan Lip-Bu (陳立武; born 1959), Malaysian-born American executive and entrepreneur, executive chairman of Cadence Design Systems and Chairman of Walden International
- Tan Min Liang (陳民亮; born 1977), Singaporean businessman and internet entrepreneur, the co-founder, CEO and creative director of Razer Inc., the CEO of THX
- Tan Tock Seng (陳篤生; 1798–1850), Leader of Hokkien community, Kapitan China of Singapore and first Asian to be appointed Justice of the Peace
- Lucio Tan (陳永栽; born 1934), Filipino-Chinese businessman and owner of Philippine Airlines

==== Sports ====
- Johnny Chan (陳金海; born 1957), Chinese-American professional poker player
- Kelly Chan Kum Seng (陳金星; 1956–1998), Singaporean windsurfer, ranked number one in Raceboard Lightweight class by International Boardsailing Association in 1992
- Patrick Chan (陳偉群; born 1990), Canadian figure skater, 2018 Olympic gold medallist in the team event
- Chan Siu Wing (陳兆榮; born 1993), Hong Kong professional basketball player
- Chan Yau-Man (born 1952), Malaysian-American table tennis player, technology executive and reality TV contestant
- Bruce Chen (born 1977), Panamanian Major League Baseball player
- Chen Chi-ting (陳紀廷; born 1999), Taiwanese badminton player
- Chen Ding (born 1992), racewalker, 2012 Olympic champion
- Chen Dong (陳冬; born 1978), PLA fighter pilot and taikonaut
- Chen Fake (陳發科; 1887–1957), prominent martial artist of Chen-style tai chi
- Chen Fushou (陳福壽; 1932–2020), Indonesian badminton gold medalist, later became the head coach of the China national women's badminton team, which won 25 team or individual world championships under his leadership
- Chen Hong (陳宏; born 1979), former Chinese badminton player
- Chen Jia (born 2004), Chinese diver
- Chen Jin (陳金; born 1986), former world men's singles champion in badminton
- Kaitlyn Chen ( 陳紫柔; born 2002), Taiwanese-American basketball player
- Karen Chen (陳楷雯; born 1999), American figure skater, 2022 Olympic Games team event silver medalist
- Chen Lu (born 1976), PRC figure skater and 1995 World Champion
- Napa Kiatwanchai (born 1967), Thai professional boxer (born as Suwit Sae-tang)
- Nathan Chen (陳巍; born 1999), American figure skater, 2022 Olympic champion and gold medalist
- Chen Po-liang (born 1988), Taiwanese footballer
- Chen Qingchen, PRC badminton player
- Chen Qingping (陳清平; 1795–1868), Influential martial artist and teacher of tai chi
- Chen Shaoguo (born 1971), PRC former racewalker
- Jin Sun-Yu (陳善有; born 1988), South Korean short-track speed skater, triple Olympic Champion from 2006 and three-time Overall World Champion
- Chen Tze-chung (born 1958), Taiwanese professional golfer also known as T. C. Chen
- Chen Wei-Yin (born 1985), Taiwanese professional baseball pitcher
- Xavier Chen (born 1983), Belgian-Taiwanese footballer
- Chen Xiaowang, 19th generation lineage holder of Chen-style tai chi
- Chen Yu (born 1980), Chinese badminton player
- Tan Aik Huang (陳奕芳; born 1946), former Malaysian All-England Open men's singles champion
- Tan Aik Quan (陳裖荃; born 1990), Malaysian badminton player who has achieved as world number 15 in the mixed doubles.
- Tan Boon Heong (陳文宏; born 1987), former World No. 1 Malaysian professional badminton player in men's doubles event
- Tan Cheng Hoe (陳清和; born 1968), Malaysian football manager and former football player
- Tan Hoan Liong (陳香良; 1938–2009), Indonesian–Dutch chess player, the first Indonesian and one of the first Asian chess players to hold the International Master title
- Tan Hong Djien, Indonesian football player, played in the 1938 FIFA World Cup
- Tan Howe Liang (陳浩亮; 1933–2024), Singaporean weightlifter
- Tan Joe Hok (陳有福; born 1937), Indonesian badminton player
- Tan Kian Meng (陳健銘; born 1994), Malaysian badminton player who specializes in doubles events
- Tan Liong Houw, Indonesian football player
- Tan Mo Heng, Indonesian football goalkeeper
- Tan See Han, Indonesian football player
- Tan Teng Chuan Steven (born 1970), Singaporean footballer for Singapore national team during the 1990s
- Tan Wee Kiong (陳煒強; born 1989), Malaysian badminton player
- Tan Wee Gieen (born 1994), Malaysian badminton player
- Tan Yee Khan (陳貽權; born 1940), former Malaysian badminton player
- Sutanto Tan, Indonesian football player
- Harmony Tan (born 1997), French professional tennis player

==== Academics and Doctors ====
- Leighton Chan (born 1961), American medical researcher and rehabilitation physician, Chief of the Rehabilitation Medicine Department at the National Institutes of Health Clinical Center
- Margaret Chan (born 1947), Chinese-Canadian physician, director of World Health Organization
- Tony Fan-Cheong Chan (陳繁昌; born 1952), Chinese-American mathematician, President of the King Abdullah University of Science and Technology
- Rosanna Yuen-Yan Chan (陳苑茵), Chinese computer scientist
- Chan Wing-tsit (陳榮捷; 1901–1994), Chinese scholar and professor best known for his studies of Chinese philosophy and W.T. Chan Fellowships Program was established by the Lingnan Foundation in his memory
- Chen Chen (born 1989), American poet
- Chen Chung-shin (陳忠信), General Secretary of the Boy Scouts of China and was awarded the 157th Bronze Wolf, the only distinction of the World Organization of the Scout Movement, awarded by the World Scout Committee for exceptional services to world Scouting.
- Chen Chunying (陳春英), Chemist and professor of chemistry at the National Center for Nanoscience and Technology
- Chen Guanrong, mathematician who made contributions to Chaos theory
- Chen Hualan (陳化蘭; born 1969), Veterinary virologist best known for researching animal epidemic diseases
- Chen Jingguang, Chinese-American chemical engineer and Thayer Lindsley Professor of Chemical Engineering at Columbia University
- Chen Jingrun (陳景潤; 1933–1996), mathematician, known for Chen prime and Chen's theorem
- Chen Jiun-Shyan, American engineering professor at University of California, San Diego
- Chen Mengjia (陳夢家; 1911–1966), scholar and archaeologist, considered the foremost authority on oracle bones and Professor of Chinese at Tsinghua University
- Peter Chen Pin-Shan (陳品山; born 1947), computer scientist, inventor of the Entity-Relationship Model
- Chen Saijuan, hematologist and molecular biologist with a research focus on leukemia cytogenetics
- Chen Wei, Epidemiologist and virologist specializing in biodefense
- Chen Yinke (陳寅恪; 1890–1969), historian and fellow of Academia Sinica, considered one of the most original and creative historians in 20th century China
- Chen Zhongwei (陳中偉; 1929–2004), expert in orthopedic surgery and microsurgery, one of the pioneers of the process of reattaching severed limbs
- Chen Zhu (born 1953), PRC hematologist, molecular biologist, and politician, former Minister of Health
- Chern Shiing-Shen (陳省身; 1911–2004), Chinese-American mathematician, known for Chern–Gauss–Bonnet theorem, Chern class, Chern–Simons theory, etc.
- Lynda Chin (born 1968), Chinese-American cancer genomic scientist
- Alexander C. Tan, New Zealand academic and professor of political science
- Tan Chorh Chuan (陳祝全), Singaporean college administrator and professor, President of the National University of Singapore (2008–2017) and director of medical devices in Ministry of Health (2000–2004)
- Tan Eng Chye (陈永财; born 1962), Singaporean mathematician, President of the National University of Singapore since 2018
- Tan Giok Lan Mely (陳玉蘭; born 1930), Indonesian sociologist
- Tan Kheng Boon Eugene (陳慶文; born 1970), associate professor of law at Singapore Management University
- Tan Tai Yong (陳大榮), Singaporean academic and former politician, President of Yale-NUS College
- Tan Tjin Kie (1853–1919), Majoor-titulair der Chinezen, high-ranking bureaucrat, courtier, sugar baron, also the founder and patron of the Confucian revival and Tiong Hoa Hwee Koan in Cirebon
- Tan Tjoen Tiat (陳濬哲; 1816–1880), second Majoor der Chinezen ("Major of the Chinese") of Batavia (1865–1879)
- Tan Yueh Ming (1945–2010), also known as Hadi Soesastro, Indonesian economist, political scientist (international relations), founder and former executive director of Centre for Strategic and International Studies (Indonesia)
- Tan Shot Yen, Indonesian doctor and dietitian
- Michael Tan (born 1952), a Chinese Filipino medical anthropologist and the 10th Chancellor of the University of the Philippines Diliman

==== Criminals ====
- Tan Chor Jin (陳楚仁; 1966–2009), Singaporean gang lord and murderer
- Tan Kheng Ann (陈庆安; 1941–1965), Singaporean gang member and murderer
- Tan Mui Choo (陈梅珠; 1953/1954–1988), Singaporean child killer
- Tan Ping Koon (陈平坤; born 1968), Singaporean kidnapper
- Kelly Tan Ah Hong (陈亚凤; 1968–1990), Singaporean murder victim
- Michael Tan Teow (陈朝; 1953–1990), Singaporean murderer

==== Miscellaneous ====
- Alfredo Chen (died 2002), Belizean shooting victim
- Tan Eng Yan 陈英燕, Singaporean murder victim and former fruit stall helper
- Jason Chan (disambiguation), several people, including:
  - Jason Chan Chi-san (陳智燊; born 1977), Hong Kong actor and television presenter
  - Jason Chan Keng-Kwin (born 1971), Malaysian-Australian actor
  - Jason Chan Pak-Yu (陳柏宇; born 1983), Hong Kong Canadian singer
  - Jason Chan (born 1984), former Papua New Guinea international rugby league footballer
  - Jason Chan (born 1996), Canadian-Australian ice dancer and 2019 Australian national senior champion
  - Jason Chan (born 1991), Chinese Canadian video game player best known for streaming Hearthstone on Twitch
- Aaron Chen (disambiguation), several people
- Chen Gang (disambiguation), several people
- Jason Chen (disambiguation), several people
- Desmond Tan, several people including:
  - Tan Kok Ming Desmond (陳國明; born 1970), Singaporean politician and former Brigadier-General in Singapore Armed Forces
  - Desmond Tan (陳泂江; born 1986), Singaporean actor

== Other ==
- Chen Fu Zhen Ren (陳府真人), ancestral deity of Indonesian Chinese residing throughout Banyuwangi Regency, Java, Bali, and Lombok, also worshipped by Balinese and Javanese (Kejawen).
- Chen Jinggu (陳靖姑), Taoist deity and protective goddess of women, children, and pregnancy, also known as Lady Linshui (臨水夫人). She is worshipped in Fujian, Taiwan, South China, and across East Asia and Southeast Asia.
- Chen-style tai chi, Northern Chinese martial art and the original form of tai chi.
- Tran (surname), second most common Vietnamese surname, the Vietnamese spelling of 陳
- Chen (disambiguation)
- Chen Commandery
- The Hebrew surname חן is also spelled Chen.

== Clan temples and associations ==
- Tan Si Chong Su (陳氏宗祠), also known as Poh Chiak Keng (保赤宮), built around 1876 in Singapore
- Eng Chuan Tong Tan Kongsi (穎川堂陳公司), built around 1878 in Georgetown, Penang, Malaysia

== Fictional ==
- Chen, a character in Arknights
- Chen, a character in the British science fiction sitcom Red Dwarf
- Chen, a character in the bullet hell shoot 'em up video game series Touhou Project
- Chen, the Holy Knight, a character in the Warcraft III: Reign of Chaos custom map Defense of the Ancients
- The Chen family (Ollie, June, Esther, and Ruben), a group of characters who mainly appear in The Ghost and Molly McGee
- Alex Chen, a character in the video game series Life Is Strange
- Charlie Chan, a fictional detective
- Detective Grace Chen, a central character in Martial Law
- Chan Ho-nam, the fictitious Hong Kong triad boss in the Young and Dangerous film series
- Chen Jialuo, protagonist of the Wuxia novel The Book and the Sword
- Jing-Mei Chen, a Chinese-American physician in the television drama series ER
- Kai Chen, a character from Power Rangers Lost Galaxy.
- Lily Chen, a supporting Chinese-Welsh character from Fireman Sam
- Master Chen, a character in Ninjago
- Skylor Chen, a character in Ninjago
- Chen Stormstout, an important character in the World of Warcraft: Mists of Pandaria, as well as playable hero in Warcraft III: The Frozen Throne and Heroes of the Storm
- Chen Zhen, a fictional Chinese martial artist and culture hero
- Lucy Chen (character) from television series The Rookie, played by Melissa O'Neil
