= Kwee family =

Kwee (Chinese: 郭; pinyin: Guō; Pe̍h-ōe-jī: Koeh) is a Chinese-Indonesian surname, based on the Dutch romanization in Java, Indonesia of Chinese surname Guo. It may refer to one of several unrelated families:

- Kwee family of Ciledug, an historic family of the 'Cabang Atas' or Chinese gentry of colonial Indonesia.
- Kwee family (Pontiac), a Singaporean business family of Chinese-Indonesian descent.
