= Chen Wu =

Chen Wu may refer to:

- Chen Wu (Han dynasty) (陳武), general serving under the warlord Sun Quan during the late Han dynasty
- Chen Wu (politician) (陳武; 1954–2026), Chairman of Guangxi Zhuang Autonomous Region
- Chen Wu (Fengshen Bang) (陳梧), fictional character in the novel Fengshen Bang
