= Shing =

Shing may refer to:

- Shing (Hainish Cycle), a fictional alien race in the Hainish Cycle of novels and short stories by Ursula K. Le Guin, especially in City of Illusions.
- Shing (surname), spelling of various Chinese surnames
- Shing, Tajikistan
- An onomatopoeia often used for bladed objects
- A Shina tribe of Chilas

== See also ==
- Sing (disambiguation)
