= Seng =

- Language: Chinese, German, Korean

Origin
- Meaning: German: 'to singe'; Korean: 'to accomplish' (成), 'star' (星)

Other names
- Variant forms: Chinese: Cheng, Sheng, Shing; Korean: Seong, Sung

Seng is a Cambodian, Chinese, German, and Korean surname.

== Origins ==
Seng may be the spelling of multiple Chinese surnames, based on their pronunciation in different varieties of Chinese; they are listed below by their spelling in Hanyu Pinyin, which reflects the standard Mandarin pronunciation:

1. Sēng (僧), a surname found primarily in Henan. The word itself originated from the Sanskrit sangha 'association', and in Chinese most commonly means bhikkhu 'Buddhist monk'. In some cases it may have originated as an occupational surname, in others as a transcription into Chinese characters of a Mongolian name.
2. Chéng (成), spelled Seng based on its pronunciation in various Southern Min dialects (e.g. Hokkien Pe̍h-ōe-jī: Sêng; Teochew Peng'im: Sêng^{5})
3. Shéng (盛), homophonous or nearly-homophonous with the above surname in most Southern Min dialects (e.g. Hokkien Pe̍h-ōe-jī: Sêng; Teochew Peng'im: Sêng^{6})
4. Chén (陳/陈), spelled Seng based on its Hainanese pronunciation (Hainanese Transliteration Scheme: Sin^{2}). This spelling is found for example in Singapore.
5. Shěn (沈)
6. Zhuāng (莊/庄)

The Cambodian surname Seng (សេង) probably originates from the Southern Min pronunciations of Chéng or Shéng.

The German surname Seng in most cases originated as a toponymic surname for a person who lived on land which had been cleared by fire, from Middle High German sengen 'to singe'. In some cases it originated as an occupational surname for a farmer, from MHG senge 'ready to cut (of grain)', or as a patronymic from the hypocorism Seng (whose origin is unclear). Though there is a village by the name Seng in Altötting district in far southeastern Bavaria, the distribution of the surname within Germany (largely concentrated in northwestern Bavaria and neighbouring states) appears to rule out the earlier theory that the surname was related to that village.

As a Korean surname, Seng is the spelling, in the relatively rare Yale romanization of Korean, of the surname spelled in the much-more-common Revised Romanization of Korean as Seong (Korean: 성). It can be written with either of two hanja: Irul Seong (이룰 成 'to accomplish'; same character as for the second Chinese surname listed above), and Byeol Seong (별 星 'star').

== Statistics ==
There were 720 people in Germany with the surname Seng, making it the 4,824th-most-common surname.

The 2000 South Korean census found 184,555 people in 57,248 households with the surname Irul Seong, and 808 people in 265 households with the surname Byeol Seong. This surname is only rarely spelled as Seng; in a study based on year 2007 applications for South Korean passports, among the 292 applicants with this surname in the sample, only one chose to spell it as Seng, as compared to 197 applicants who spelled it as Sung, and 86 as Seong.

The 2010 United States census found 4,563 people with the surname Seng, making it the 7,311th-most-common name in the country. This represented an increase from 3,588 (8,457th-most-common) in the 2000 census. In the 2010 census, about 55% of bearers of the surname identified as Asian (up from 46% in 2000), and 38% as non-Hispanic white (down from 45% in 2000). It was the 563rd-most-common surname among respondents to the 2000 census who identified as Asian.

== People ==
- Samuel T. Y. Seng (沈祖榮; 1884–1977), Chinese librarian
- Willi Seng (1909–1944), German communist and anti-Nazi resistance fighter
- Seng Liang (沈良; 1913–?), Chinese weightlifter
- Coleen Seng (1936–2025), American local politician in Lincoln, Nebraska
- Joe Seng (1946–2016), American local politician in Iowa
- Seng Han Thong (成汉通; born 1950), Singaporean politician
- Theary Seng (born 1971), Cambodian-born American human-rights activist and lawyer
- James Seng (庄振宏; fl. 1990s–present), Singaporean Internet businessman
- Seng Sothea (សេង សុធា; born 1984), Cambodian chef
- Jarrad Seng (born 1988), Australian photographer and filmmaker
