= Chen Gang =

Chen Gang may refer to:

- Chen Gang (intelligence officer) (1906–1967), early Communist intelligence officer
- Chen Gang (composer) (1935–2026), Chinese composer, known for the Butterfly Lovers' Violin Concerto
- Chen Gang (born 1965), politician, Party Secretary of Guangxi, former party chief of Xiong'an New Area, Hebei
- Chen Gang (born 1966), former politician, Vice Mayor of Beijing
- Chen Gang (actor), Chinese film actor (Old Stone)
- Chen Gang (1977–2011), lecturer who killed himself upon learning he did not win an election for a college Communist Youth League secretary position, see Suicide of Chen Gang
- Gang Chen (engineer), former head of the Department of Mechanical Engineering at the Massachusetts Institute of Technology

== Sports ==
- Chen Gang (table tennis) (born 1968), Chinese para table tennis player
- Chen Gang (footballer) (born 1972), Qingdao Hainiu F.C. player
- Chen Gang (badminton) (born 1976), Chinese badminton player
