= Sheng (surname) =

Shēng (生)
- Pronunciation: Shēng (Mandarin)
- Language: Chinese

Origin
- Language: Old Chinese

Other names
- Variant forms: Sheng (Mandarin Wade Giles); Shing (Cantonese); Seng (Southern Min)

Sheng is the Mandarin pinyin and Wade–Giles romanization of the Chinese surname written with the Chinese character 生 or 盛. It is romanized as Shing based on its Cantonese pronunciation, or Seng based on its Southern Min pronunciations. It is a rare Chinese surname that is widely distributed but with a relatively small population.

Sheng is listed 146th in the Song dynasty classic text Hundred Family Surnames. As of 2008, it is the 175th most common surname in China, shared by 700,000 people.

== History ==
=== Literature ===
In ancient classic literature such as Zhuangzi and Gangjian — Yizhilu, Yuchao, Suiren, and Zhisheng (知生) were believed to be the pioneers who taught people production techniques. So, they were commonly respected as the "Three Emperors" as a title of honor for their contributions.

There had a sentence refer to the surname, "in summer, gather firewood, and in winter, burn it, hence the people were named Zhisheng's people".

Zhuangzi mentioned that Yuchao, Suiren, and Zhisheng were the representative figures of three important eras in history. Taiping Guangji Laozi referred to Heaven, Earth, and Humanity as the "Upper Three Emperors" while Yuchao, Suiren, and Zhisheng were the "Lower Three Emperors". They represents an important development stage in human history, where Yuchao solved the problem of human settlement, Suiren solved the food problem, and Zhisheng began to teach people how to produce, thus opening the era of agricultural civilization.

== Notable people ==
- Sheng Xian (2nd century), Eastern Han dynasty official
- Sheng Yanshi (盛彦师; died 622), Sui dynasty rebel leader under Li Yuan
- Sheng Wenyu (盛文鬱; 1316–1370), Yuan dynasty rebel leader under Han Shantong
- Sheng Yong (盛庸; 1334–1403), Ming dynasty general
- Sheng Ne (盛訥; 16th century), Ming dynasty Vice Minister of Personnel
- Sheng Yihong (盛以弘; 17th century), Ming dynasty Minister of Rites, son of Sheng Ne
- Sheng Fusheng (盛符升; 17th century), Qing dynasty poet and official
- Sheng Kang (盛康; 1814–1902), Qing dynasty official, father of Sheng Xuanhuai
- Sheng Xuanhuai (盛宣懷; 1844–1916), Qing dynasty tycoon, Minister of Transport, and founder of several universities
- Sheng Zhushu (盛竹书; 1860–1927), chairman of the Bank of Communications
- Sheng Pihua (盛丕华; 1882–1961), entrepreneur, Vice Mayor of Shanghai
- Sheng Enyi (盛恩頤; 1892–1958), businessman and banker, son of Sheng Xuanhuai
- Sheng Shicai (1895–1970), warlord who ruled Xinjiang province
- Sheng Aiyi (1900–1983), businesswoman, daughter of Sheng Xuanhuai
- Sheng Zhenwei (盛振爲; 1900–1997), legal theorist, dean of Soochow University law school
- Sheng Wen (盛文; 1906–1971), Republic of China lieutenant general
- Sheng Tongsheng (1911–1987), agronomist, member of the Chinese Academy of Sciences
- Sheng Jinzhang (盛金章; 1921–2007), palaeontologist, member of the Chinese Academy of Sciences
- Cao Ying, born Sheng Junfeng (1923–2015), translator
- Sheng Huaren (盛华仁; 1935–20??), former CEO of China Petrochemical Corporation
- Sheng Chu-ju (盛竹如; born 1940), Taiwanese journalist and anchor, son of Sheng Wen
- Sheng Zhongguo (1941–2018), violinist
- Sheng Guangzu (born 1949), Minister of Railways
- Sheng Xue (born 1962), Chinese-Canadian journalist and writer
- Emile Sheng (born 1968), Minister of Council for Cultural Affairs of the Republic of China (2009–2011)
- Xiaodong Sheng (born 1998), China-born Canadian badminton player
- Sheng Zetian (born 1972), wrestler, three-time Olympic medalist
- Sheng Chien (盛鑑; born 1973), Taiwanese Peking opera performer and actor
- James Shing (盛品儒; born 1976), former executive of Asia Television, descendant of Sheng Xuanhuai
- Sheng Yilun (盛翔; born 1992), Chinese actor
