= Tan Gin Ho =

Indonesian bureaucrat and writer

Tan Gin Ho, Luitenant der Chinezen (1880–1941) was a bureaucrat, Malay-language writer and scion of the influential Tan family of Cirebon, part of the ‘Cabang Atas’ gentry of the Dutch East Indies (now Indonesia).

== Biography ==
Born in Cirebon, Tan was the eldest son of Ong Hwie Nio and Tan Tjin Kie, Majoor-titulair der Chinezen, the head administrator of the Chinese community of Cirebon (1852–1919). Through his father, Tan was a grandson, great-grandson and great-great-grandson of previous Kapiteins der Chinezen of his hometown of Cirebon. Their family was deeply embedded in the Chinese officership, which consisted of the ranks of Majoor, Kapitein and Luitenant der Chinezen, and was an arm of the colonial civil bureaucracy through which the Dutch governed their Chinese subjects in the Indies.

Tan had a brother, Tan Gin Han, and a sister, Tan Ho Lie Nio. He was a native Malay speaker, like most Peranakan Chinese, but his writings show that his education gave him both some familiarity with the Chinese Classics and fluency – at least in writing – in Dutch. He also had a keen interest in Confucianism, Daoism, Buddhism and theosophy.

In 1897, at the age of 17, Tan Gin Ho was raised to the post of Luitenant der Chinezen, serving under his father. From 1907 until 1909, Luitenant Tan Gin Ho was on leave from active duty, and was temporarily replaced by his brother-in-law, Luitenant Kwee Tjong In. Tan resigned from his post for good in 1913.

In 1914, Tan’s brother, Tan Gin Han, bought a Fiat Landaulet Torpedo, a luxurious six-meter car, from the car importer firm Verweij en Lugard's Automobiel Maatschappij. Supposedly the most expensive car in Java at the time, this acquisition triggered an interest in car ownership in Tan’s extended family, including their cousins, the Kwee family of Ciledug.

Soon after his father, the Majoor-titulair, died in 1919, Luitenant Tan Gin Ho wrote a highly popular commemorative book, Peringetan dari Wafatnja Majoor Tan Tjin Kie (Batavia, 1919). This, Tan’s best-known work, details the days leading to his father’s death, the funeral arrangements and ceremonies, as well as the messages of condolences and visiting dignitaries. It is illustrated with photographs from the private family collection, showing the lavish world of the Tan family of Cirebon in the late nineteenth and early twentieth century. A newspaper article from 1919 put the estimated total costs of the late Majoor’s funeral and mausoleum at 580,000 guilders – in today’s currency (2019), a multimillion-US dollar sum.

Tan’s book proved a kind of eulogy to his family’s status as the preeminent and oldest dynasty of the Cabang Atas in the Residency of Cirebon. The Great War (1914–1918) and the subsequent sugar crisis had a ruinous impact on their finances. The colonial government, moreover, imposed a massive, war profit tax of one million guilders on the family. In 1922, Luitenant Tan Gin Ho and his brother, Tan Gin Han, filed a bankruptcy petition, and were forced to sell Loewoenggadjah – one of Java’s largest, Chinese-owned sugar mills that had been founded in 1828 by their great-grandfather, Kapitein Tan Kim Lim. In 1931, the Luitenant and his brother were declared bankrupt.

Luitenant Tan Gin Ho's first published work was a re-adaptation of a European hagiographic work on Napoleon, Emperor of the French. For the rest of the 1930s and early 1940s, he authored, translated and readapted books on literature, history, religion and astrology. The former Luitenant died in Cirebon in 1941.

== Ancestry ==
Ancestors of Tan Gin Ho

Tan Kong Djan, Kapitein der Chinezen
8. Tan Kim Lin, Kapitein der Chinezen
Nj. Kapitein Tan Kong Djan
4. Tan Tiang Keng, Kapitein der Chinezen (1826–1884)
9. Nj. Kapitein Tan Kim Lin
2. Tan Tjin Kie, Majoor-titulair der Chinezen (1853–1919)
10. Kong She Oey
5. Oey Te Nio
1. Tan Gin Ho, Luitenant der Chinezen
6. Kong She Ong
3. Ong Hwie Nio

== List of works ==
- Peringetan dari wafatnja Majoor Tan Tjin Kie Batavia: G. Kolff & Co. (1919)
- Kitab "Ka'adjaiban takdir": dari soeal takdir, masoek dalam soeal agama Batavia: The Chinese & English Book (1935)
- Wet dari karma dan Wet dari reincarnatie Cirebon: De Boer (1938)
- To dan Tek-to menerangkan wet-alam, sorga dan neraka Batavia: The Chinese & English Book (1940)

== See also ==
- Tan Tjin Kie, Majoor-titulair der Chinezen, his father
- The Tan family of Cirebon, his family
- The Kwee family of Ciledug, his cousins
- The Cabang Atas elite
- The institution of Kapitan Cina
