= Tan family of Cirebon =

The Tan family of Cirebon was an influential family of government officials, sugar barons and landowners in the Dutch East Indies, particularly in the Residency of Cirebon. They were the preeminent and oldest family of the ‘Cabang Atas’ gentry in Cirebon all through the 19th and early 20th century.

== The Chinese Officership of Cirebon ==
For over a century and five generations, the family dominated Cirebon's Chinese officership, a civil government institution consisting of the ranks of Majoor, Kapitein and Luitenant der Chinezen through which the Dutch governed the local Chinese community of the colony. The first known member of the family, Tan Kong Djan, was Kapitein der Chinezen of Cirebon in the mid-1820s. In 1830, he celebrated the completion of the renovation of Kelenteng Tiao Kak Sie – the city's main Chinese temple – by putting up a commemorative wooden plaque, bearing his name. It is unclear whether any family relationship existed between the Kapitein and his predecessors, many of whom bore the surname of Tan. The Dutch-Indonesian researcher Steve Haryono suggests that the family, whose origin in Java probably predated Kapitein Tan Kong Djan, may have originally come from Batavia, capital of the Dutch East Indies.

In the second generation, two of his sons succeeded him in the Captaincy of Cirebon. Kapitein Tan Kim Lin took over the post from his father in the early 1830s, before dying in 1835. Soon after his brother's death, Kapitein Tan Phan Long (died in 1848) acceded to the Captaincy, and held office until retiring in 1846. He was the first Kapitein of Cirebon to be recorded in the colonial government's Regerings-almanak, that of 1836. Another brother, Tan Pin Long, served as Luitenant der Chinezen in Batavia from 1830 until 1837.

In the third generation, Luitenant Tan Pin Long's son, Tan Siauw Tjoe, held the honorary rank of Luitenant-titulair der Chinezen in his capacity as a Boedelmeester in Batavia's Boedelkamer or Estate Chamber, the government custodial body in charge of the inheritance of minors. Luitenant-titulair Tan Siauw Tjoe was, however, dismissed from office in 1847 for his involvement in opium smuggling; reinstated in 1849, he was dismissed again in 1854. In Cirebon, upon the resignation of Kapitein Tan Phan Long in 1846, his nephew Tan Tiang Keng (1826 – 1884), part of the third generation as the eldest son of Kapitein Tan Kim Lin, was raised to the office of Luitenant der Chinezen, serving under his uncle's successor. Although Luitenant Tan Tiang Keng did not immediately accede to the Captaincy, he was given the honorary rank of Kapitein-titulair der Chinezen in 1873 after 26 years in office. In 1882, Kapitein-titulair Tan Tiang Keng was finally elevated, like his grandfather, father and uncle before him, to the post of Kapitein der Chinezen of Cirebon.

Also in 1882, the newly-inaugurated Kapitein's son, Tan Tjin Kie, the most prominent member of the fourth generation, was installed as Luitenant der Chinezen. In 1884, when Kapitein Tiang Keng died in office, Luitenant Tan Tjin Kie was passed over in the succession in favor of an older officer; but, two of his in-laws, the cousins Kwee Keng Eng and Kwee Keng Liem (husbands of the Luitenant’s sister and cousin respectively), were both raised to the post of Luitenant der Chinezen. In 1888, when the Captaincy again became vacant, Luitenant Tan Tjin Kie finally succeeded his father, granduncle, grandfather and great-grandfather as Kapitein der Chinezen of Cirebon. In 1913, as an unusual mark of high esteem, the colonial authorities awarded Kapitein Tan Tjin Kie the rank of Majoor-titulair der Chinezen. Cirebon – unlike the capital cities of Batavia, Semarang and Surabaya – was normally headed only by a Kapitein, not a Majoor. The Majoor died in office in 1919, and was given a lavish and much-remembered 40-day-long funeral ceremony, drawing visiting dignitaries from far and wide.

In 1897, Kapitein Tan Tjin Kie's eldest son, Tan Gin Ho – a fifth-generation descendant of Kapitein Tan Kong Djan – was installed as Luitenant der Chinezen under his father. Also part of the fifth generation was Kwee Zwan Hong, who was appointed in 1908 as Luitenant of Losari, Sindanglaut and Ciledug, and further raised to the rank of Kapitein-titulair in 1924. Kapitein-titulair Kwee Zwan Hong was the son of Luitenant Kwee Keng Liem and, through his maternal grandmother Tan Sioe Nio, was a great-grandson of Kapitein Tan Kim Lin; in office until 1934, he was also the last serving Chinese officer in the Residency of Cirebon.

== Sugar barons ==
The Tan family of Cirebon played a pioneering and significant role in Java's sugar industry until the Great Depression (1929–1939). The famous sugar mill of Loewoenggadjah was founded in 1828 by Kapitein Tan Kim Lin of Cirebon. This mill was inherited by his eldest son, Kapitein Tan Tiang Keng, his grandson, Majoor-titulair Tan Tjin Kie, then by his great-grandsons, Luitenant Tan Gin Ho and Tan Gin Han.

By the 1880s, the Tan family owned a constellation of other sugar mills in addition to Loewoenggadjah, including Ardjosarie, Karangredjo, Krian, Mabet, Porwasrie, Soemengko and Tjiledoek. They were allied with the closely related Kwee family of Ciledug, owners of the Djatipiring and Kalitandjoeng sugar mills.

The aftermath of the Great War (1914–1918) proved catastrophic for the Tan family of Cirebon. In 1922, they were forced to sell their main sugar mill, Loeowenggadjah, due to mounting debts. In 1926, Majoor Tan Tjin Kie's daughter, Tan Ho Lie Nio, was declared bankrupt. In 1931, both of her brothers, Luitenant Tan Gin Ho and Tan Gin Han were also declared bankrupt. Their Kwee cousins, descended on the female line from Kapitein Tan Kim Lin, fared better financially. Although forced by circumstances to sell their Djatipiring sugar mill in 1931, they maintained their political, social and economic prominence well into the 1950s. Many of the current descendants of the family no longer live in Cirebon. Many members moved to the Netherlands, the majority of whom now live in The Hague. Within Indonesia, several members of the family also moved to the nearby city of Bandung, and the current head of the family is Tan Tjin Hok, living under the surname 'Hermanto'.

== See also ==
- Tan Tjin Kie, Majoor-titulair der Chinezen, family patriarch in the late 19th and early 20th century
- The prominent Kwee family of Ciledug, female-line descendants of the Tan family of Cirebon
- The women's rights activist and philanthropist Nj. Kapitein Lie Tjian Tjoen, a member of the Tan family of Cirebon through her mother
- The 'Cabang Atas' elite
