= Xiang Chen =

Chinese business executive and chef

Xiang Chen (born 1990) is a Chinese business executive and chef. He is known for being a founding partner of Turing Future Capital, executive vice president of the presidium of the Chaochung Association, and founder and CEO of the health food company Xian Wei Ye Ye.

== Early life and education ==
Chen grew up in Chaozhou and attended Jinshan Middle School in Chaozhou City. He graduated from the University of California, Berkeley, earning a degree in environmental economics and policy. He has EMBA degrees from Cheung Kong Graduate School of Business and PBC School of Finance at Tsinghua University.

== Career ==
Chen’s first business endeavors include the online car rental and travel company All In Co and the online study abroad platform PAIR Study Abroad, which were established in 2013.

In 2014, Chen joined the private enterprise Honggye Group as the vice chairman of the board.

Chen was elected president of the North American branch of the Teochew Creation Association at the second Teochew Innovation and Entrepreneurship Conference in Shantou in August 2015.

Chen participated in the “Economic Situation and Private Enterprise Development” symposium in Zhongnanhai in 2017.^{[8]}

Chen founded the food technology and health food company Xian Wei Ye Ye in September 2020. He based Xian Wei Ye Ye’s products on his knowledge of his native Chaoshan cuisine. Chen also oversaw Turing Future Capital’s donations of medical supplies to his hometown of Chaozhou after the breakout of the COVID-19 pandemic. Chen was named to China’s Forbes 30 Under 30 list in 2020.

Chen participated in the “27 Asian Young Leaders Forum” hosted by the Guangzhou Municipal People’s Government, the China Public Diplomacy Association, the China Peace and Development Foundation, and the Asian Young Leaders Federation in 2021. He served as one of the speakers at a closed-door roundtable organized by Relay China Young Leaders.

In 2022, Chen was ranked 36th in 36KR’s X·36 Under 36 Heroes of the Year list.
