= Jason Chan =

Jason Chan may refer to:

- Jason Keng-Kwin Chan (born 1971), Australian actor
- Jason Chan Chi-san (born 1977), Hong Kong actor and television presenter
- Jason Chan (singer) (born 1983), Hong Kong singer
- Jason Chan (rugby league) (born 1984), rugby league player
- Jason Chan (figure skater) (born 1996), Canadian-Australian ice dancer
- Amaz (gamer) (born 1991), Hong Kong-born Canadian-American video game player Jason Chan
- Jason Chan, cover artist of the Keeper of the Lost Cities series

== See also ==
- Jason Chen (disambiguation)
