= Chen Biao =

3rd century Eastern Wu official and general

- 陳表

Lieutenant-General (偏將軍)
- In office c. 237–?
- Monarch: Sun Quan

Commandant of Xin'an (新安都尉)
- In office 234 – c. 237
- Monarch: Sun Quan
- Succeeded by: Zhuge Rong

Commandant of the Central Flank (翼正都尉)
- In office 229 – ?
- Monarch: Sun Quan

Zhongshuzi to the Crown Prince (太子中庶子)
- In office 221 – ?
- Monarch: Sun Quan

Personal details
- Born: c.204
- Died: c.237
- Children: Chen Ao
- Parents: Chen Wu (father); Chen Wu's concubine (mother)
- Occupation: Official, general
- Courtesy name: Wen'ao (文奧)
- Peerage: Marquis of a Chief District (都鄉侯)

Chen Biao (c.204 - c.237 (Note: While Chen Biao's biography in Sanguozhi only recorded that he died at the age of 34 (by East Asian age reckoning), his biography also stated that he died after Wu Ju's rebellion. Wu Ju's rebellion was dated to the 6th year of the Jiahe era of Sun Quan's reign in Lu Xun's biography (volume 58 of Sanguozhi); this corresponds to 12 Feb 237 to 1 Feb 238 in the Julian calendar. Thus, Chen Biao's death date should be shortly after 237. Also, Chen Biao definitely died in early 241 or before, as Sun Deng died in mid-241.)), courtesy name Wen'ao, was an official and military general of the state of Eastern Wu during the Three Kingdoms period of China.

== Family background ==
Chen Biao was a son of Chen Wu, a general who served under the warlord Sun Quan in the late Eastern Han dynasty. He was born to Chen Wu's concubine and was a younger half-brother of Chen Xiu (陳脩), who was born to Chen Wu's official spouse. Chen Wu was killed in action in 215 at the Battle of Xiaoyao Ford, while Chen Xiu died in 229, shortly after Sun Quan proclaimed himself emperor and established the state of Eastern Wu.

== Service in Eastern Wu ==
=== Early career ===
Chen Biao was already famous in his youth. He was selected to be an aide to the crown prince Sun Deng (Sun Quan's eldest son), together with Zhuge Ke, Gu Tan and Zhang Xiu. Chen Biao was a close friend of Ji Yan, a Master of Writing (尚書). When Ji Yan was accused of negligence in his duties, the other officials shunned him for fear of being implicated, but Chen Biao spoke up for Ji Yan and earned the respect of many ministers. Chen Biao was later appointed as a zhongshuzi to the Crown Prince (太子中庶子) and a Commandant of the Central Flank (翼正都尉).

=== Incident with Shi Ming ===
Chen Biao requested to serve in the military just like his father before him, and was placed in command of 500 troops. He was eager to win the hearts of his soldiers so he treated them well and they were willing to die for him. Once, there was an incident of grand theft and the suspect was Shi Ming (施明), a soldier from the Wunan (無難) camp. Shi Ming had been arrested and interrogated, but he remained fierce, refused to reveal the truth, and even expressed his willingness to die. The Minister of Justice (廷尉) was unable to do anything to him. Sun Quan heard that Chen Biao understood a soldier's mentality well so he ordered Chen to take up Shi Ming's case. Chen Biao had Shi Ming released from his shackles and allowed him to take a bath and have a change of clothes, and treated him to a feast. Shi Ming was so touched by Chen Biao's generous treatment that he confessed to the crime and named his accomplices. Sun Quan was very surprised and impressed with Chen Biao, so he granted a special pardon to Shi Ming to protect Chen's reputation – because Chen would be labelled as a hypocrite if Shi were to be executed after confessing under Chen's kind treatment. Shi Ming's accomplices, on the other hand, were not so lucky as they were all executed. Shi Ming mended his ways and gradually rose through the ranks to become a general in Eastern Wu.

=== Mid career ===
Chen Biao was later promoted to be the Right Commander (右部督) of the Wunan camp and he received the title of a Marquis of a Chief Village (都亭侯). However, he rejected the marquis title and requested to have it transferred to Chen Xiu's son, Chen Yan (陳延), but Sun Quan refused.

In 234, Zhuge Ke was appointed as the Administrator (太守) of Danyang (丹楊) and was sent to suppress a revolt by the Shanyue tribes. Sun Quan appointed Chen Biao as the Commandant (都尉) of Xin'an County (新安縣; present-day Quzhou, Zhejiang) and ordered him to be Zhuge Ke's advisor. Earlier on, Sun Quan had granted 200 taxable households to Chen Biao's family in recognition of Chen Wu's contributions, and those families were all based in Xin'an County. Chen Biao saw that the men from those households were able-bodied and capable of serving in the military, so he requested permission from Sun Quan to recruit those men. Sun Quan asked him, "Your late father rendered meritorious service to the state, and the state has granted your family these taxable households to honour his contributions. Why do you not want them?" Chen Biao replied, "I pledged to eliminate all the enemies of the state and avenge my father. It is not my wish to have these men – who are capable of military service – as my slaves." He insisted on recruiting those men so Sun Quan agreed and praised him. Sun Quan then selected some households from other areas to replace those in Chen Biao's marquisate who had been conscripted.

=== Later career ===
Throughout his three years in office, Chen Biao made developments in his jurisdiction and managed to recruit over 10,000 troops. At the time, Wu Ju (吳遽) had started a rebellion in Poyang (鄱陽) and had conquered cities, causing much fear and panic in the surrounding counties. Chen Biao led his forces to suppress the revolt and succeeded in forcing Wu Ju to surrender. On Lu Xun's recommendation, Chen Biao was subsequently promoted to Lieutenant-General (偏將軍) and his marquis rank was increased from a village marquis to a district marquis. He moved to Zhangkeng (章阬) and garrisoned there.

== Death ==
Chen Biao died at the age of 34 (by East Asian age reckoning) after Wu Ju's rebellion. He had dedicated all his family income to military expenses so his family was very poor when he died. The crown prince Sun Deng had a house built for Chen Biao's family.

== Anecdote ==
When Chen Biao's elder half-brother Chen Xiu died, Chen Biao's mother refused to submit to Chen Xiu's mother, who had a higher status in the family because she was Chen Wu's official spouse. Chen Biao told his mother, "It's unfortunate that my brother died early. Now, I'm the head of the family so I should pay respect to my stepmother. Mother, I hope you can accept my stepmother and maintain harmonious relations with her. If you can't, I'll leave and stay elsewhere." Chen Biao said so out of graciousness and filial piety. His mother agreed and got along well with his stepmother.

== Descendants ==
When Chen Biao's son, Chen Ao (陳敖), reached the age of 16, he was commissioned as a Major of Separate Command (別部司馬) and placed in charge of 400 troops. After Chen Ao died, his cousin Chen Yan (陳延) inherited his military appointment.

== See also ==
- Lists of people of the Three Kingdoms
