= Rosanna Yuen-Yan Chan =

Chinese computer scientist

- Citizenship: China
- Education: Chinese University of Hong Kong
- Occupations: Computer scientist and engineering educator
- Employer: Chinese University of Hong Kong
- Awards: IEEE William E. Sayle II Award for Achievement in Education

Rosanna Yuen-Yan Chan (Chinese: 陳苑茵) is a Chinese computer scientist and engineering educator known for her research on educational technology, especially for students with special needs. More broadly, her research has concerned human–computer interaction in online social networks. She is an adjunct associate professor of information engineering at the Chinese University of Hong Kong.

== Education and career ==
Chan is originally from Hong Kong. She was a student of information engineering at the Chinese University of Hong Kong, receiving a bachelor's degree in 1998, master's degree in 2000, and Ph.D. in 2006. She also has a master's degree in educational psychology from the university, received in 2009.

She became an assistant professor of information engineering at the Chinese University of Hong Kong from 2006 to 2007, and was a postdoctoral researcher at the University of Hong Kong from 2008 to 2011 before returning to the Chinese University of Hong Kong in her present position as adjunct associate professor.

She is the founding chair of the Hong Kong Chapter of the IEEE Education Society.

== Recognition ==
Chan was the 2021 recipient of the IEEE William E. Sayle II Award for Achievement in Education, given "for contributions to the field of learning technologies for special education needs". She became a distinguished lecturer of the IEEE Education Society for 2024–2025, and was named to the 2025 class of IEEE Fellows, "for contributions to learning technologies for special education needs and social inclusion."
