= Chen Yanran =

Chinese illustrator

Chloe Chen
- 陈嫣冉
- Born: Chen Yanran; 12 May 2005 (age 20)
- Website: www.chloechen.art

Chen Yanran (Chinese: 陈嫣冉, also known as Chloe Chen, born 2005) is a Chinese artist and illustrator.

== Early life and career ==
Chen started drawing independently at the young age of 3. She began working seriously in illustration at the age of 13; and went on to study art design, stop-motion animation, and styling at the Rhode Island School of Design at the age of 14. In addition to her academic pursuits, Chen worked as a visual consultant for the dystopian sci-fi comedy "Time is up" (马美好). At the age of 16, she enrolled in the Manga Department at Kyoto Seika University in Japan, where she focused on the study of manga. Chen was influenced by Japanese horror comics and French experimental cinema, which she incorporates into her own works.

She has participated in a number of charity auctions with her works. In 2023, Chen held her first solo exhibition titled "NOWHERE" at the SOMSOC GALLERY Contemporary Gallery in Harajuku, Tokyo.

== Works ==
- Wonderland: Yanran Chen, Year of the Dragon Artist Cover Special Project, Creation of "DRAGON"

== Exhibitions ==
- Tokyo Solo Exhibition, Tsutaya Books Daikanyama, 17 Sarugakucho, Shibuya City, Tokyo, Japan, 2024
- ComplexCon Hong Kong, at AsiaWorld-Expo, Hong Kong, 2024
- Rekindle - Experiential Fusion of Contemporary Urban Art, at Shanghai Exhibition Centre, China, 2023
- ART021 Shanghai Contemporary Art Fair, at Shanghai Exhibition Center, Shanghai, China, 2023
- ART AMOY, at Xiamen International Conference & Exhibition Center, Xiamen, China, 2023
- Art Market Budapest, at Bálna, Budapest, Hungary, 2023
