= Sindanglaut =

Village in Pandeglang Regency, Banten, Indonesia

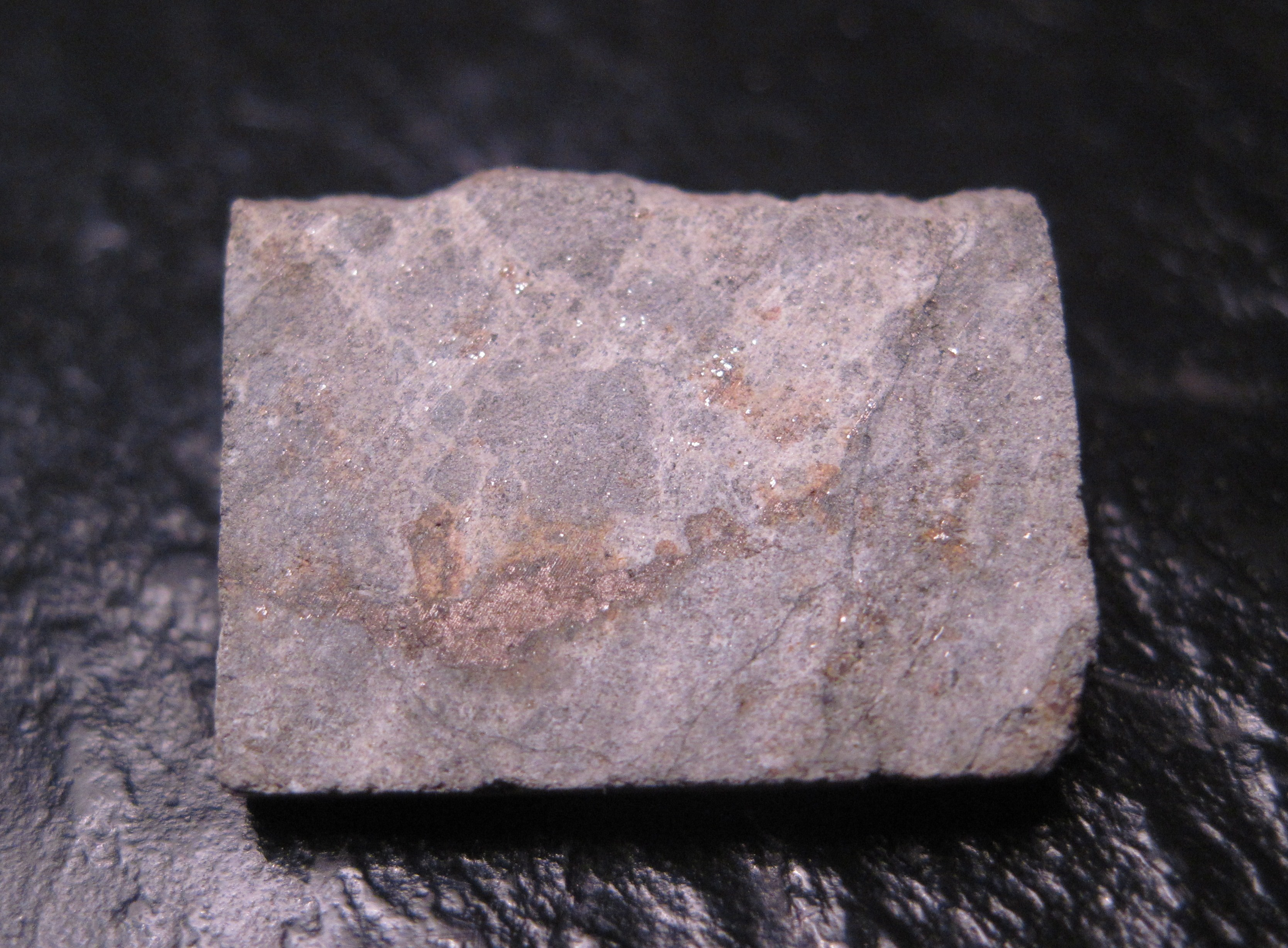
Slice of the Bandung meteorite; the majority of the 11.5 kg TKW is held by the Bandung Geological Museum and the Paris Museum of History. This partial slice weighs 2.43 grams and shows a brecciated matrix

Sindanglaut is a village in Lemahabang district, Cirebon province, West Java, Indonesia. The Postal code is: 45 183. It is home to farmers, traders, and factory workers. Residents speak Javanese and Sundanese because it is located in the border region between West Java and Central Java. On December 10, 1871, six meteorites fell in the area including an LL6 chondrite, 11.5 kg TKW that is held by the Bandung Geological Museum and a slice of it at the Paris Museum of History.
