= Chen Changwen =

Chinese politician and lawyer

- 陳長文

Secretary of Straits Exchange Foundation
- In office 1990s–1990s

President of Red Cross Society of the Republic of China
- In office 1980s–1980s

Personal details
- Born: 1944 (age 81–82) Kunming, Yunnan, Republic of China
- Party: Kuomintang
- Parent: Chen Shouren (father)
- Education: National Taiwan University (LLB); University of British Columbia (LLM); Harvard University (LLM, SJD)
- Occupation: Politician; lawyer

Chen Changwen (Chinese: 陳長文; pinyin: Chén Chángwén; born 1944) is a Taiwanese legal scholar who was the secretary of the Straits Exchange Foundation and the president of the Red Cross Society of the Republic of China. Chen was chairman and chief executive officer of Lee and Li, one of Taiwan's largest law firms, and currently serves as senior partner.

== Biography ==
Chen was born in 1944 in Kunming, Yunnan, the fourth child of Chen Shou-ren (Chinese: 陳壽人), a soldier who graduated from the Whampoa Military Academy. His family to Taiwan after the Chinese Civil War in 1949 during the Great Retreat. In October 1949, Chen Shouren was transferred to Sichuan and was appointed chief of staff of the 69th army. Later, he died in Qionglai.

Chen Changwen was raised in Taipei. He graduated with a Bachelor of Laws (LL.B.) from National Taiwan University in 1967, then pursued graduate studies in Canada, where he earned a Master of Laws (LL.M.) from the University of British Columbia in 1969. His LL.M. thesis was titled, "The problems of micro-states in international law".

After receiving his master's degree, Chen went to the United States to attend Harvard University. He earned a second LL.M. in 1970 and his Doctor of Juridical Science (S.J.D.) in 1972 from Harvard Law School. His doctoral dissertation was titled, "China and the law of consular relations".

In the 1980s, Chen served as the president of the Red Cross Society of the Republic of China. In the early 1990s, Chen was appointed the secretary of the Straits Exchange Foundation.
