= Tan Tjin Kie =

Bureaucrat and Majoor-titulair der Chinezen of Cirebon

Padoeka Majoor-titulair der Chinezen Tan Tjin Kie

Kapitein der Chinezen of Cirebon
- In office 1888–1913
- Preceded by: Kapitein The Tjiauw Tjay
- Succeeded by: Himself as Majoor
- Constituency: Cirebon

Majoor-titulair der Chinezen of Cirebon
- In office 1913–1919
- Preceded by: Himself as Kapitein
- Succeeded by: Oey Thiam Tjoan as Kapitein
- Constituency: Cirebon

Personal details
- Born: January 25, 1853 Cirebon, Dutch East Indies
- Died: February 13, 1919 (aged 66) Cirebon, Dutch East Indies
- Spouse: Ong Hwie Nio
- Relations: Nj. Kapitein Lie Tjian Tjoen (cousin); Kwee Zwan Hong, Kapitein-titulair der Chinezen (cousin); Phoa Keng Hek (in-law)
- Children: Tan Gin Ho, Luitenant der Chinezen; Tan Gin Han; Tan Ho Lie Nio
- Parents: Tan Tiang Keng, Kapitein der Chinezen of Cirebon (father); Oey Te Nio (mother)
- Occupation: Bureaucrat, sugar magnate, courtier
- Awards: Mandarin of the First Rank (To-Wan; 1908); Mandarin of the Second Rank (To-Ham; 1893); Gouden Ster voor Trouw en Verdienste (1909)

Tan Tjin Kie, Majoor-titulair der Chinezen (January 25, 1853 – February 13, 1919) was a high-ranking bureaucrat, courtier, sugar baron and head of the prominent Tan family of Cirebon, part of the ‘Cabang Atas’ or Chinese gentry of the Dutch East Indies (now Indonesia). He is best remembered today for his lavish, 40-day-long funeral ceremony of 1919, reputedly the most expensive ever held in Java.

== Family background ==
Tan Tjin Kie was born in Cirebon to the Peranakan couple Oey Te Nio and Luitenant Tan Tiang Keng (1826–1884), later raised to the post of Kapitein der Chinezen of Cirebon – Chinese headman – in 1882. The institution of Chinese officers was a civil arm of the colonial bureaucracy, through which the Dutch authorities governed their Chinese subjects in the Indies.

Through his father, Tan was a grandson and grandnephew of Cirebon’s earlier Chinese headmen: Tan Kim Lin, who was Kapitein from the early 1830s until his death in 1835; and Tan Phan Long, who was Kapitein from 1836 until his retirement in 1846. He was also a great-grandson of Tan Kong Djan, Kapitein der Chinezen of Cirebon in the 1820s.

In line with Chinese naming conventions, he acquired at least three other known names over the course of his life in addition to his birth name, Tjin Kie, which was taboo to younger family members. His courtesy name as an adult was Keng Bie, while his government name as an official was Sie Hoen. His school name was Boen Siang.

== Bureaucratic career ==
Aged 29, Tan was installed as a Luitenant der Chinezen in 1882, the year his father acceded to the Captaincy of Cirebon. On his father’s death in 1884, Luitenant Tan Tjin Kie was passed over in the succession in favor of an older Chinese officer, befitting the established custom of the time. That year, however, saw the elevation to the post of Luitenant der Chinezen of Tan’s two in-laws, the cousins Kwee Keng Eng and Kwee Keng Liem, husbands respectively of the Luitenant’s sister Tan Oen Tok Nio and cousin Tjoe Soei Lan Nio. In 1886, another in-law, Aw Seng Hoe, husband of the Luitenant’s cousin Tan An Nio, was appointed as Luitenant der Chinezen of Majalengka. When the Captaincy again became vacant in 1888, Luitenant Tan Tjin Kie, aged 35, finally succeeded to the headman post of Kapitein of Cirebon, an office once occupied by his father, granduncle, grandfather and great-grandfather.

In 1893, Kapitein Tan Tjin Kie received an honorary imperial appointment from the Guangxu Emperor of China as a Mandarin of the Second Rank (To-Ham). A rare promotion to Mandarin of the First Rank (To-Wan) followed in 1908. In 1909, the Dutch authorities awarded the Kapitein with the Gouden Ster voor Trouw en Verdienste, the highest rank in the colonial equivalent of the Order of the Netherlands Lion.

A hallmark of Kapitein Tan Tjin Kie’s tenure was his management, in Cirebon, of the Java-wide communal infighting of 1912 between local Chinese and Arabs. Tan negotiated a peace deal with leaders of the Arab community, and – in a widely applauded and brave move – led a procession of 50 Chinese community leaders to Cirebon’s Arab district to confirm the agreement. In so doing, the Kapitein was widely credited with the maintenance of peace and order in Cirebon, which contrasted with the many lost lives in the rest of Java. In 1913, in celebration of Tan’s 25th-year jubilee as a Chinese officer and in recognition of his role in resolving the Arab-Chinese conflict of 1912, the Dutch colonial government elevated the Kapitein to the rank of Majoor-titulair der Chinezen. This rare mark of esteem was only once awarded in the whole history of the Chinese officership of Cirebon; unlike the colonial capitals of Batavia, Semarang and Surabaya, Cirebon's Chinese community was normally headed by a Kapitein instead of the higher-ranked Majoor.

== Courtier and philanthropist ==
The Tan family of Cirebon lived as part of the royal courts of Cirebon for generations, and were keen patrons of Javanese art and culture. Majoor-titulair Tan Tjin Kie was part of this tradition, collecting Javanese masks, puppets and rare manuscripts, and maintaining private gamelan orchestras.

Beyond Cirebon, the Majoor also maintained close relations with Pakubuwono X, the Susuhunan of Surakarta and Java’s premier native prince. The latter visited Majoor-titulair Tan Tjin Kie a number of times, including in 1916, when the Susuhunan stayed at the Majoor’s palatial residence in Loewoenggadjah.

As the highest-ranking Chinese bureaucrat in Cirebon and head of the city’s oldest bureaucratic Chinese family, Majoor-titulair Tan Tjin Kie supported many social causes. For instance, he was an important donor behind the founding of the Ziekenhuis Oranje (today Gunung Jati State Hospital).

Within the local Chinese community, he continued the long association between the Chinese officership and Kelenteng Tiao Kak Sie, Cirebon’s most important Chinese temple. In 1889, he inaugurated a plaque to celebrate the temple’s renovation under his patronage, noting that an earlier renovation was completed in 1830 under the auspices of his great-grandfather, Kapitein Tan Kong Djan. The Majoor was President of Kong Djoe Koan, a funeral service foundation, and Bechermheer (Patron) of Hok Sioe Hwee, a Chinese funeral trust. Similarly, he was also the founder and Bechermheer of the Confucian revival and educational organization Tiong Hoa Hwee Koan in Cirebon.

== Death, funeral and posterity ==
Majoor-titulair Tan Tjin Kie died in office in 1919. By his wife, Ong Hwie Nio, Tan had two sons, Tan Gin Ho and Tan Gin Han, and a daughter, Tan Ho Lie Nio. His eldest son, Tan Gin Ho, and his son-in-law, Kwee Tjiong In, served as Luitenants der Chinezen, the former from 1898 until 1913, and the latter from 1907 until 1910, then again from 1913 until 1920. His younger son, Tan Gin Han, married Phoa Kiat Liang, a grandniece of the community leader Phoa Keng Hek, and a great-granddaughter of Phoa Tjeng Tjoan, Kapitein der Chinezen of Buitenzorg.

The late Majoor’s magnificent, 40-day-long funeral ceremony was reputed to have been the most expensive ever to have been held in Java. Preceded by eight military bands from Batavia and Bandung, the procession itself was divided into nine sections. Accompanied by a platoon of police officers sent by Johan Paul, Count van Limburg-Stirum, the Governor-General of the Dutch East Indies, there was a four-horse carriage with a portrait of the deceased. After a procession of members of various organizations and schoolchildren under the late Majoor’s patronage, his coffin arrived in a four-horse carriage, pulled in addition by 250 coolies in uniform. The funeral service itself was presided by Tibetan Buddhist Lamas, brought over from Tibet.

De Preangerbode, a colonial newspaper, estimated the funeral and associated costs at 280,000 guilders, excluding a 300,000-guilder mausoleum built for the deceased Majoor by his children. In today’s currency (2019), the combined sum of the funeral and mausoleum amounted to a multimillion-US dollar fortune.

== See also ==
- The Tan family of Cirebon
- The Kwee family of Ciledug
- The Cabang Atas elite
- The institution of Kapitan Cina

Government offices
| Preceded by Kapitein The Tjiauw Tjay | Kapitein der Chinezen of Cirebon; 1888–1913 | Himself as Majoor-titulair |
| New title | Majoor-titulair der Chinezen of Cirebon; 1888–1913 | Succeeded by Oey Thiam Tjoan as Kapitein |
