= Lee and Li =

Taiwanese law firm

Lee and Li, Attorneys-at-Law 理律法律事務所
- Headquarters: Taipei, Taiwan
- No. of offices: 3
- No. of attorneys: 190+
- No. of employees: 850+
- Major practice areas: Full Service
- Key people: Chen Changwen; Nigel N.T. Li; C. C. Lee
- Date founded: 1965
- Founder: James Lee; C. N. Li
- Company type: Law Firm
- Website: leeandli.com

Lee and Li, Attorneys-at-Law (Chinese: 理律法律事務所) is a law firm headquartered in Taipei, Taiwan. Founded in 1965 by James Lee and C. N. Li, the firm has offices in Taipei, Hsinchu, Taichung, and southern Taiwan.

== Practices ==
- Banking and Finance/Capital Markets/Insurance
- Corporate and Investment/Mergers and Acquisitions - Non-Financial Institutions and Financial Institutions/Tax/Labor/Life Sciences/Competition Laws/Real Estate and Construction/Government Contracts/Digital, TMT and Data Privacy
- Civil Dispute Resolution/Criminal Litigation/Public Law Dispute Resolution/Environmental Law/Energy Law/Family Heritage plan and Family Affairs/International Trade
- Patent Enforcement, Trade Secret Protection and Dispute Resolution/Patent Prosecution and Maintenance/Patent Drafting and Global Patent Protection/Patent Search, Patent Validity and Infringement Assessment
- Trademark/Copyrights Enforcement, Maintenance and Dispute Resolution/Trademark Dispute Resolutions/Global Trademark and Copyright Protection
- P.R.C. Practice
- Japanese Practice Department

== Notable people ==
- Chen Changwen, former secretary of the Straits Exchange Foundation and president of the Red Cross Society of the Republic of China.
