= Wing-tsit Chan =

Chinese academic (1901–1994)

- 陳榮捷
- Born: 18 August 1901; Kaiping, Guangdong Province, Qing Empire
- Died: 12 August 1994 (aged 92); Pittsburgh, Pennsylvania, United States
- Citizenship: USA
- Education: Lingnan University; Harvard University
- Children: 3
- Scientific career
- Fields: Chinese philosophy
- Workplaces: Columbia University, Dartmouth College, Chatham University

Chinese name
- Traditional Chinese: 陳榮捷
- Simplified Chinese: 陈荣捷
Transcriptions
Standard Mandarin
- Hanyu Pinyin: Chén Róngjié
Yue: Cantonese
- Yale Romanization: Chàhn Wìhng jit
- Jyutping: can4 wing4 zit3

Wing-tsit Chan (Chinese: 陳榮捷; 18 August 1901 – 12 August 1994) was a Chinese scholar and professor best known for his studies of Chinese philosophy and his translations of Chinese philosophical texts. Chan was born in China in 1901 and went to the United States in 1924, earning a Ph.D. from Harvard University in 1929. Chan taught at Dartmouth College and Chatham University for most of his academic career. Chan's 1963 book A Source Book in Chinese Philosophy was highly influential in the English-speaking world, and was often used as a source for quotations from Chinese philosophical classics.

== Life and career ==
Chan Wing-tsit was born on 18 August 1901 in Kaiping, a city in China's southern Guangdong Province. In 1916 he enrolled at Canton Christian College (later Lingnan University) near Canton (modern Guangzhou). After graduating with a bachelor's degree from Lingnan, he began his graduate studies at Harvard University in 1924. There he studied with Irving Babbitt, William Ernest Hocking, and Alfred North Whitehead, and was advised by James Haughton Woods, an eminent Sanskritist and translator of the Yoga Sutra. Chan received his Ph.D. in Philosophy and Chinese Culture in 1929.

On his return to China in 1929, Chan received an appointment at Lingnan, which in 1927 had been reconstituted as Lingnan University, and served as its dean of the faculty from 1929 to 1936. In 1935 the University of Hawaiʻi at Mānoa offered him a visiting appointment. In 1937 he moved to Honolulu and taught there until 1942. He then taught at Dartmouth College from 1942 to 1966. One of his students, Jack Kornfield, was inspired by Chan to leave for Asia after graduation and study Buddhism in Thailand and subsequently helped introduce Buddhism to a Western audience. He was Professor Emeritus of Chinese Philosophy and Culture at Dartmouth College, and from 1966 to 1982, Anna R.D. Gillespie Professor of Philosophy at Chatham University in Pittsburgh, Pennsylvania. In retirement, Chan taught part-time at Chatham and at Columbia University.

Chan was the author of A Source Book in Chinese Philosophy, one of the most influential sources in the field of Asian studies, and of hundreds of books and articles in both English and Chinese on Chinese philosophy and religion. He was a leading translator of Chinese philosophical texts into English in the 20th century. He was also the author of articles on Chinese philosophy, Classical Confucian texts, Ou-Yang Hsiu, and Wang Yang-Ming in the Macropedia of the Encyclopædia Britannica (15th edition, 1977 imprint). He expressed particular satisfaction over his chapter, The path to wisdom: Chinese philosophy and religion, in the book, Half the World: The History and Culture of China and Japan (1973), edited by Arnold J. Toynbee. He had received numerous academic honors and was a member of the Academia Sinica.

Chan died in Pittsburgh on August 12, 1994.

The W.T. Chan Fellowships Program was established in his memory by the Lingnan Foundation in 2000, and fellowships are awarded annually to students of Lingnan University (Hong Kong) and Sun Yat-sen University (Guangzhou).

== Personal life ==
He married Wai Hing (died 1993) and is survived by a daughter, Jan Thomas Chan of Berkeley, California; two sons, Lo-Yi Chan, of New York, and Gordon Chan, of Mobile, Alabama, and five grandchildren.

== Selected works ==
- A Source Book in Chinese Philosophy (Princeton University Press, 1963). ISBN 0-691-01964-9
- (with Wm. Theodore de Bary and Burton Watson) Sources of Chinese Tradition (Columbia University Press, 1960)
- An Outline and an Annotated Bibliography of Chinese Philosophy (Yale University Far Eastern Publications, 1969)
- Reflections on Things at Hand: The Neo-Confucian anthology compiled by Chu Hsi and Lü Tsu-Ch'ien (Columbia University Press, 1967)
- Instructions for Practical Living and Other Neo-Confucian Writings by Wang Yang-Ming (Columbia University Press, 1963)
- Religious Trends in Modern China (Columbia University Press, 1953)
- Chinese philosophy, 1949-63
- The Way of Lao Tzu (Bobbs-Merrill, 1963)
- (with Ariane Rump) Commentary on the Lao Tzu by Wang Pi (University of Hawaiʻi, 1979)
- The path to wisdom: Chinese Philosophy and religion, a chapter in Half the world: The history and culture of China and Japan (Thames and Hudson, London, 1973), edited by Arnold J. Toynbee.
- (ed., with Charles Moore) The Essentials of Buddhist Philosophy by Junjirō Takakusu (Greenwood Press, Westport, Connecticut. 1976)
- Chu Hsi New Studies (1989)

== Honors ==
- Association for Asian Studies (AAS), 1992 Award for Distinguished Contributions to Asian Studies
