= Chen Zhongwei =

Chinese surgeon (1929–2004)

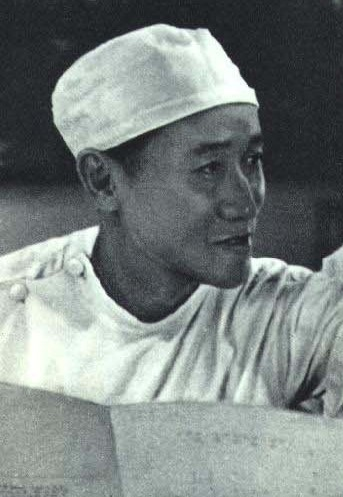
Chen Zhongwei in surgery, 1963

Chen Zhongwei (Chinese: 陳中偉; 1929–2004) was a Chinese orthopedic surgeon. He was an expert of orthopedic surgery and microsurgery, one of the pioneers of the process of reattaching severed limbs.

Chen was born in Ningbo on October 1, 1929. In 1954 he graduated from the second medical college of Shanghai, and became the subdecanal of the Sixth People's Hospital in Shanghai later. In 1980 he was elected as an academician of the Chinese Academy of Sciences. He served as the president of International Society for Reconstructive Microsurgery from 1985 to 1988, and became a member of TWAS in 1986.

Chen was most notable for successfully replantating the right hand of a Chinese factory worker named Wang Cunbo in 1963. And later he used microsurgical technique in the severed limbs reattaching operation, highly increased the success rate of replantating.

Chen died in Shanghai on March 23, 2004 after falling from the balcony of his apartment.
