= Aaron Chen (disambiguation) =

Aaron Chen is an Australian comedian and actor.

Aaron Chen may also refer to:

- Aaron Chen, co-writer on The New Adventures of Nanoboy
- Chen Chao-jung, Taiwanese actor
