= Kwee family of Ciledug =

- Cabang Atas
- Country: Dutch East Indies; Indonesia; Netherlands
- Origin: Qing Empire
- Founded: 1820s (left Fujian)
- Founder: Kwee Giok San
- Titles: Kapitein-titulair and Luitenant der Chinezen; Sia
- Connected families: The Tan family of Cirebon; The Han family of Lasem

The Kwee family of Ciledug was an influential bureaucratic and business dynasty of the 'Cabang Atas' or the Chinese gentry of the Dutch East Indies (modern-day Indonesia). From the mid-nineteenth until the mid-twentieth century, they featured prominently in the colonial bureaucracy of Java as Chinese officers, and played an important role in the sugar industry. Like many in the Cabang Atas, they were pioneering, early adopters of European education and modernity in colonial Indonesia. During the Indonesian Revolution, they also hosted most of the negotiations leading to the Linggadjati Agreement of 1946.

== Origin and rise ==
The family is descended from Kwee Giok San, a Chinese migrant who left his native Fujian in the 1820s for Nanyang – the 'South Sea' – before finally settling down around the 1840s in Ciledug, a small town in the Residency of Cirebon on the border of West Java and Central Java. By the mid-nineteenth century, Kwee had associated himself with the Cabang Atas through his wife, Oei Tjoen Nio, a probable sister-in-law of Tan Kim Lim, Kapitein der Chinezen (grandfather of Tan Tjin Kie, Majoor-titulair der Chinezen), whose family had served as Chinese officers since the start of the nineteenth century in Cirebon and Batavia, capital of the Indies. By the 1860s, Kwee had acquired his own sugar factory.

Kwee's descendants through his two sons, Kwee Ban Hok and Kwee Boen Pien, continued the family's ascent. The youngest, Boen Pien, bought the important Djatipiring sugar factory, from its previous European owners in August 1873. In October 1874, Boen Pien was installed as Luitenant der Chinezen of the districts of Sindanglaut, Losari and Ciledug – the family's first Chinese officer. In 1884, Lieutenant Kwee Boen Pien died in office and was succeeded in both his Chinese lieutenancy and Djatipiring by his second son, Kwee Keng Liem. That same year, Kwee Keng Eng, also part of the family's third generation through his father Kwee Ban Hok, was appointed Lieutenant der Chinezen of Cirebon, serving under the city's Kapitein. The latter was, like his cousin, also the owner of an important sugar factory, that of Kalitandjoeng.

In the fourth generation, Lieutenant Kwee Keng Liem's eldest son Kwee Zwan Hong succeeded his father in 1908 as Lieutenant of Sindanglaut, Losari and Ciledug, and was further elevated to the higher rank of Kapitein-titulair in 1924. Kapitein-titulair Kwee Zwan Hong was in office until 1934, when the institution of Chinese officers was abolished in Java, and was the last sitting Chinese officer in Cirebon. The Kapitein's half-brother, Kwee Zwan Lwan, won a seat on the Regency Council of Cirebon in 1925, and by the 1930s had succeeded his eldest brother as a de facto head and Chinese community leader of Cirebon.

Like their ancestor Kwee Giok San, successive generations of his descendants contracted strategic marriages with other families of the Cabang Atas. The third generation typified this web of alliances: Lieutenant Kwee Keng Eng was married to Tan Oen Tok Nio, Majoor-titulair Tan Tjin Kie's sister, while the former's cousin, Lieutenant Kwee Keng Liem was married to the Majoor's cousin, Tjoa Swie Lan Nio. On his first wife's death, Lieutenant Kwee Keng Liem then married the much younger and western-educated Tan Hok Nio, grandniece of Lieutenant Tan Kong Hoa of Batavia and Lieutenant Tan Yoe Hoa of Bekasi. In addition to Kapitein-titulair Kwee Zwan Hong from his first marriage, Lieutenant Kwee Keng Liem had one daughter and three sons from his second marriage: Kwee Der Tjie, Kwee Zwan Lwan, Kwee Zwan Liang and Kwee Zwan Ho.

In the fourth generation, Kapitein-titulair Kwee Zwan Hong married Lim Ke Tie Nio, daughter of Lim Goan Tjeng, Lieutenant der Chinezen of Batavia, while his half-sister, Der Tjie, married Han Tiauw Bing, son of Kapitein Han Hoo Tjoan of the Pasuruan branch of the powerful Han family of Lasem. Their brothers, Zwan Lwan, Zwan Liang and Zwan Ho were married respectively to Jenny Be Kiam Nio, daughter of the bureaucrat and courtier Be Kwat Koen, Majoor-titulair der Chinezen of Surakarta; to Roos Liem Hwat Nio, heiress of a Surabaya family and grandniece of Lieutenant Liem Bong Lien of Pasuruan; and to Betty Tan Ing Nio, granddaughter Tan Goan Piauw, Kapitein der Chinezen of Buitenzorg and Landheer (or landlord) of the vast Tegalwaroe domains.

== Pioneers of modernity and an international outlook ==
Family members of the fourth and fifth generations who matured in the 1910s were 'agents of change' and 'carriers of modernity' in the words of the Dutch historian Peter Post, in particular the daughter and three sons of Lieutenant Kwee Keng Liem's second marriage. The Lieutenant and his wife employed European tutors and governesses to give their children a modern western education, and later sent some of them to board with European families in Batavia in order to attend the colonial capital's superior western-style educational institutions. Kwee women, like the men of the family, enjoyed a lot of freedom and embraced western-style modernity.

Another example of their modern outlook to their peers was the family's enthusiastic adoption of car ownership. The first car in the Dutch East Indies belonged to the colony's premier native monarch, Pakubuwono X, Susuhunan of Surakarta, who bought a Mercedes-Benz in 1894, thereby becoming the world's first car-owning monarch. A cousin of the Kwee family, Tan Gin Han, son of Majoor Tan Tjin Kie, bought a luxurious six-metre Fiat in 1914. Later that year, inspired by their cousin, the Kwee brothers bought a Lancia Theta Coloniale. By 1916, the family had four automobiles; and by the 1920s they had acquired two luxury cars: a Pierce-Arrow (also owned by the likes of Hirohito and Reza Shah) and a Marmon.

In 1929, the Kwee family of Ciledug played host to King Rama VII of Siam at Djatipiring thanks to the intercession of their well-connected in-law, Majoor-titulair Be Kwat Koen of Surakarta, whose family had earlier hosted the monarch's father, King Chulalongkorn, in 1896. This visit gave the family much prestige, highlighting as it did their modern outlook and international connections.

== Beyond sugar, revolution and exile ==
Due to the sugar crisis during the Great Depression, the Kwee brothers of the fourth generation sold Djatipiring in 1931. Kwee Zwan Liang moved to Bandung, capital of West Java, while his other brothers, Kapitein-titulair Kwee Zwan Hong, Kwee Zwan Lwan and Kwee Zwan Ho moved to Linggadjati, a fashionable hill station outside Cirebon, where they built their villas. The Kwee family compound and garden in Linggadjati became a well-known attraction of West Java all through the 1930s; and the family often hosted visiting dignitaries.

During the Indonesian Revolution (1945–1949), the Kwee family befriended their neighbor in Linggadjati, Sutan Sjahrir, the first Prime Minister of Indonesia, and offered their compound as a venue for Dutch-Indonesian peace negotiations. Linggadjati had the benefit of being located halfway between the headquarters of the two warring factions: Batavia, where the Netherlands Indies Civil Administration had reestablished itself on the one hand; and Yogyakarta, where the revolutionary government was based on the other hand. It was, thus, at the family compound that the historically momentous Linggadjati Agreement of 15 November 1946 was negotiated.

With the increasing radicalization of newly independent Indonesia under Sukarno's revolutionary government in the 1950s, members of the Kwee family of Ciledug began leaving Indonesia for the Netherlands, where most of them reside today.

== See also ==
- Tan Tjin Kie, Majoor-titulair der Chinezen, a high-ranking bureaucrat and cousin
- Cabang Atas
- The Tan family of Cirebon
- Linggadjati Agreement
