= Jiun-Shyan Chen =

American engineer

Jiun-Shyan Chen is an American engineer, currently the William Prager Chair Professor in Structural Mechanics at University of California, San Diego, and a publisher author. He is also Elected President for American Society of Civil Engineers's Engineering Mechanics Institute, as well as being a Fellow at ASCE since 2013. He was also formerly the Chancellor's Professor in Civil & Environmental Engineering at University of California, Los Angeles.
