= Jason Chen =

Jason Chen may refer to:

- Jason Chen (businessman), CEO of Acer Inc.
- Jason Chen (singer), Taiwanese-American pop singer

== See also ==
- Jason Chan (disambiguation)
