= W.T. Chan Fellowships Program =

W.T. Chan Fellowships Program (陈荣捷奖学金项目), also known as the Lingnan Chan Fellowships Program, is a six-month program, usually from August to January, established by the Lingnan Foundation in 2001 to commemorate Wing-Tsit Chan, former Dean of Lingnan University. The program provides practical and intercultural experiences for (mostly) Chinese Students in the United States.

The Lingnan Foundation selected W.T. Chan 'Fellows' based on their commitment to the service. Each selected Fellow is assigned to work at a non-profit organization in California, in which they are supervised by program organizers. Foundation Members live in American homes for the full duration of the program.

Also attending seminars on non-profit organization management and community development, cultural events, along with a weekly mandatory reflection meetings while in the country.

== Eligibility ==
Undergraduates and postgraduates from Sun Yat-sen University and Lingnan University (Hong Kong) with some conditions apply;

Sun Yat-sen University:

All second or third-year undergraduate and first-year postgraduate students (excluding international students and students from Hong Kong or Macau) from all majors are eligible to apply.

Lingnan University (Hong Kong):

All second or third-year undergraduate and postgraduate students from all majors, are eligible to apply.

Final year undergraduate and postgraduate students should provide proof of acceptance to graduate program for next academic year on or before May of the year.

The number of Fellowships awarded each year ranges from eight to twelve.

== Education sites ==
- Public Service Center - University of California, Berkeley
- US-China Institute - University of Southern California
