= Suicide of Chen Gang =

Suicide of a university lecturer in Anhui, China

Chen Gang
- 陈刚
- Born: 1977; Shandong, China
- Died: March 23, 2011 (aged 34); Anhui, China
- Cause of death: Suicide
- Education: Hefei University of Technology
- Occupation: University lecturer
- Organization: Communist Youth League of China
- Spouse: Li Zhihui
- Parent: Zhu Xiumei

Chen Gang (Chinese: 陈刚; 1977 – March 23, 2011) was a lecturer at the Hefei University of Technology, located in Anhui province in central China. Chen killed himself by jumping out of a 12th-story window in a campus building on March 23, 2011, after he found out he had lost out to a rival to become the next Communist Youth League leader at the university. In Chen's suicide note, he asserted that the selection process was unfair and riddled with corruption, and accused the university's top leaders of collusion. Chen's case gained national notoriety. Chen's family attempted to blame Chen's suicide on the university administration, while the university leadership refused to acknowledge any responsibility.

== Background ==
Chen Gang was born in 1977 to an ordinary rural family near the city of Laiwu in Shandong province. His father died when he was eleven years old. Chen took part in Gaokao and was admitted to the Hefei University of Technology (HUT) around 1994. He majored in geological exploration and graduated with a bachelor's degree in 1998. Chen remained in academia after graduating, first serving as a teaching assistant, then pursuing a master's degree in computer science. He then obtained a doctorate in management science so he could carve out a career path in public administration and government.

Chen had long served as a lecturer for the faculty of computer science at the university. While HUT was not well known when Chen first enrolled, by 2011, HUT had become the second most highly ranked university in Anhui province, next only to the University of Science and Technology of China, and joined the list of the Project 211 "elite universities". Chen spent his entire career at HUT, with the exception of a short stint in 2010 on secondment to Southeast University in Nanjing.

Beginning in January 2008, Chen took on the role of deputy secretary of the Communist Youth League organization at HUT, becoming the youngest official to have climbed to that rank on the administrative ladder at HUT. During the selection process for the position, it was said that Chen's public speaking skills were what ultimately won the day for him. During his tenure at the Youth League, he was praised for his work ethic. The Communist Youth League was generally seen as a "training ground" for cadres in preparation for prominent positions in the Chinese Communist Party, and therefore a career in government. Chen had been a member of the Communist Party since 1996. Many senior leaders in the highest echelons of political power in China had experience as Youth League leaders in their respective alma maters. In 2011, Chen stood for election for the Youth League leader (known as a "Secretary" or shuji) position at HUT. The Communist Youth League secretary position at the university carried with it the benefits of a chuji (处级) official, that is, a division-level administrative ranking similar to that of a county governor or an administrative head of a municipal district. Achieving this status at the age of 34 was considered a rare feat.

== Selection for Youth League leader ==
In mid-2010, Chen was evaluated for an associate professor position at the university, but failed to make the cut. Chen was sorely disappointed at his failure to advance and told his wife he "might as well go home and farm for a living". According to Chen's wife, he was disappointed not in the promotion per se, but more because it was not clear how the promotion process operated, and that the selection criteria seemed to change every year depending on the whims of individuals rather than on a quantitatively measurable process. Ultimately, he was convinced to stay. In early March 2011, Chen was nominated for promotion to the Youth League secretary position at HUT. His chief rival was one Chen Wen'en (陈文恩; born December 1977, no relation), who worked as the head of the administrative office in charge of a local campus of HUT.

The selection process for secretary took place in three stages: oral presentation, individual interviews, and voting by ballots. During the oral presentation stage, which consisted of delivering speeches and answering questions from a panel of senior leaders at the university, Chen Gang scored 86.21, higher than Chen Wen'en's 84.50. In the individual interviews stage, Chen Gang had 25 supporters compared to Chen Wen'en's 23. However, in the final round of voting by ballot, Chen Gang received 18 votes in favour compared to Chen Wen'en's 37 votes. The voting process took place by secret ballot on the afternoon of March 21, 2011, with senior party members, faculty, and administrative staff at the university taking part. The university asserted that the voting process followed well-established routine procedures, but the Southern Weekend and Chen Gang's supporters portray the vote as an additional procedure inserted at the last minute to stage Chen Gang's defeat.

The results of the election were finalized on March 21 after a meeting of the university's Party Standing Committee, which oversaw major personnel decisions at the university. Then the university announced Chen Wen'en to be the winner.

== Suicide ==
On the afternoon of March 23, 2011, Chen Gang jumped to his death from a 12th-floor window in the computer science building where he often taught his classes. Chen left a suicide note in which he blamed his death on the unfair selection process. In it, Chen disparaged the character of a number of senior faculty at the university, including the university's president. He complained that it was relationships, not merit, which caused the election result. Chen considered himself as a martyr to clean up the distasteful state of higher education in China, and said that he wanted to leave a legacy that "let those who get ahead through talking shit and naked opportunism; those who don't do anything useful all day and wants to climb only for power and prestige, go rot in their living hells!" Chen wrote that on the morning of the election, his opponent had been making phone calls canvassing for votes. A friend had called Chen Gang around midday, telling him that he (the friend) had been contacted by someone to vote for Chen Gang's opponent, and urged Chen Gang to do some canvassing of his own. Chen Gang, however, refused to do so, believing that he would triumph based on his abilities and merit alone.

Chen also wrote on his suicide note, "Goodbye, my dear university! Goodbye, the wicked culture of personal relationships! Goodbye, 'president' Xu! I will continue to look upon you. I urge you to erect a monument in my name; will you dare walk by it every day?" According to Southern Weekend, the university sealed and cleaned up the scene of the suicide immediately, and closed the online bulletin board system of HUT, in addition to asking local authorities to shut down social media discussion on the event.

=== Media response ===
Mainstream media was conspicuously silent after Chen Gang's death, ostensibly due to censorship, with much of the discussion of the case occurring on social media. On April 8, the Chinese newspaper Southern Weekend published a high-profile, front-page, full feature article detailing the circumstances of Chen Gang's death, suggesting that Chen was "pushed to act" due to a deep sense of injustice at the perceived corruption involved in the promotion process. Southern Weekend was known for its tendency to push the envelope of censorship in China; the suicide was not reported in state-owned media at all. The article was featured on numerous overseas news portals routinely censored in China, including Boxun.com and the New York City-based Duowei News; the latter added the tagline, "Unspoken rules are everywhere; pushed a young cadre to die".

While the Southern Weekend article generally told the story from the perspective of the Chen family and was critical in its tone towards the university, it acknowledged that many people thought Chen was driven to suicide because he could not obtain the position of power that he desperately sought. Some commentators echoed this view. Ma Zhihai of the Southern Television Guangdong program Ma Hou Pao, in analyzing Chen's suicide, said that "sometimes people get too caught up in the idea of success", noting that Chen only read books related to Mao Zedong and Li Ka-shing, or thesis-writing manuals. "His mind was only focused on success, success, success. We learned that he was a very serious man, very uptight; he didn't know how to have fun".

"Nearing the end of each dynasty, the governments were invariably infested with corruption, but at least the imperial examinations [which determined the promotion of mandarin officials] were an oasis of due process. If even these exams could be conducted at will ... well, then the dynasty is nearing its demise".

— Zhen Peng, faculty member at Shandong University, quoting scholar Zhang Ming

The Chen Gang case prompted a round of soul-searching about corruption in China, particularly in relation to how officials are evaluated and promoted in academia and in government. On May 29, 2012, Zhen Peng, a senior faculty member at Shandong University, published an open letter to Chen in which he commented on a series of incidents involving promotion of mid-level cadres in which the outcomes were very evidently unfair, due to corruption, nepotism, and the corrosive nature of the system of personal relationships known as guanxi. Zhen asserted that Chen Gang's death was reflective of much deeper systemic issues, and hinted that barring permanent political reform, these tragedies were bound to continue. Zhen said that Chen's suicide was hardly strange, and that the number of bizarre tales of individuals promoted on totally flimsy records or non-existent credentials abound in Chinese academic and political circles. Zhen asserted that under the system, personal loyalty to individuals was paramount and the foremost criteria for promotion. He also quoted former Soviet leader Yuri Andropov's view that the main weakness of the socialist system was that there was no objective process or criteria for evaluating the promotion of cadres, just as the main weakness of capitalism was the concentration of money and power, passed on and inherited among the privileged few.

=== Family response ===
Chen was married to Li Zhihui (李智慧), with whom he had a daughter. Chen's mother, Zhu Xiumei, came to the HUT campus shortly after Chen's death and, according to the university, quarreled fiercely with the university's president. Zhu sought compensation from the university. Chen's family also asked for Chen's official obituary to contain a reference to the effect that Chen had died because of his work, but the university disagreed. In his suicide note, Chen wrote that his siblings could take care of his elderly mother, but the university should be responsible for child support payments.
