= Shing (surname) =

- Pronunciation: English: /sɪŋ/ or /ʃɪŋ/
- Language: Often Chinese

Other names
- Variant form: Sing

Shing is a surname.

== Origins ==
Shing may be a spelling of multiple Chinese surnames based on different varieties of Chinese, listed below by their romanisation in Mandarin pinyin:

- Chéng (成 but not 程), spelled Sing or Shing based on the Cantonese pronunciation (Yale: Sìhng; Jyutping: Sing4; IPA: /sɪŋ²¹/).
- Shèng (盛) , homophonous with the above surname in Cantonese.
- Xīn (辛), spelled Sing or Shing based on its pronunciation in the Teochew dialect of Southern Min (Peng'im: sing¹; IPA: /siŋ³/).
- Xíng (邢), sometimes spelled in non-standard fashion as Shing, based on the Mandarin pronunciation (IPA: /ɕiŋ³⁵/).

Shing is also a surname in other cultures.

== Statistics ==
In the Netherlands, there were 44 people with the surname Shing as of 2007, up from zero in 1947.

The 2010 United States census found 340 people with the surname Shing, making it the 59,470th-most-common name in the country. This represented a decrease from 352 people (54,766th-most-common) in the 2000 Census. In both censuses, about four-fifths of the bearers of the surname identified as Asian, and about one-tenth as White.

== People ==
Notable people with these surnames include:

- Shing Fui-On (成奎安; 1955–2009), Hong Kong actor
- David Shing (born 1970), Australian technology evangelist
- Harriet Shing (born 1976), Australian politician
- Yoshua Shing (born 1993), ni-Vanuatu table tennis player
