= Chen Wu (Han dynasty) =

General serving warlord Sun Quan (died 215)

- 陳武

Lieutenant-General (偏將軍)
- In office ? – 215

Personal details
- Born: c.177 Susong County, Anhui
- Died: 215 (Note: The Sanguozhi stated that Chen Wu was killed in action at Hefei in the 20th year of the Jian'an era (196-220) in the reign of Emperor Xian of Han.); Hefei, Anhui
- Children: Chen Xiu; Chen Biao
- Occupation: General
- Courtesy name: Zilie (子烈)

Chen Wu (c.177 - 215), courtesy name Zilie, was a military general serving under the warlord Sun Quan in the late Eastern Han dynasty. He previously served under Sun Ce, Sun Quan's elder brother and predecessor.

== Life ==
Chen Wu was from Songzi County (松滋縣), Lujiang Commandery (廬江郡), which is in present-day Susong County, Anhui. He was seven chi and seven cun tall (approximately 181–186 cm). When he was about 17 years old, he travelled to Shouchun (壽春; present-day Shou County, Anhui) to meet Sun Ce, who was then a subordinate of the warlord Yuan Shu. Chen Wu later accompanied Sun Ce on his conquests in the Jiangdong region in the 190s, and was appointed as a Major of Separate Command (別部司馬) for his contributions in battle. He also followed Sun Ce to attack a minor warlord Liu Xun and helped to recruit many capable men from Lujiang to join Sun Ce's army, with him as their commander.

After Sun Ce's death in the year 200, Chen Wu continued serving under Sun Quan, Sun Ce's younger brother and successor. He was put in command of five regiments. Chen Wu was known to a kind and generous person, and he won the hearts of many people from his hometown and other places. He was deeply favoured by Sun Quan, who visited his house on several occasions. Chen Wu was later promoted to Lieutenant-General (偏將軍) for his achievements.

In 215, Chen Wu followed Sun Quan to attack Hefei, a city under the control of a rival warlord Cao Cao, which led to the Battle of Xiaoyao Ford. Sun Quan's forces suffered a disastrous defeat at the hands of Cao Cao's general Zhang Liao, who was defending Hefei. Chen Wu was killed in action.

Sun Quan mourned Chen Wu's death and attended the latter's funeral. Sun Quan also had Chen Wu's favourite concubine sacrificed to join Chen in death, and he awarded Chen's family 200 taxable households in their estate. The historian Sun Sheng criticised Sun Quan's act of forcing Chen Wu's concubine to join Chen in death, citing an earlier negative example of Duke Mu of Qin (Note: In 621 BCE, when Duke Mu of the Qin state was dying, he ordered 170 people to be sacrificed to join him in death. Among the 170 included three brothers from the Ziche (子車) family – Yanxi (奄息), Zhonghang (仲行) and Zhenhu (針虎) – who had contributed greatly to the Qin state.) and a positive example of Wei Ke (魏顆). (Note: In 594 BCE, when the forces of the Qin and Jin states clashed at Fushi (輔氏; present-day Dali County, Weinan, Shaanxi), the Jin general Wei Ke (魏顆) was fighting with a Qin general Du Hui (杜回) when an old man appeared and used a rope made from straw to trip Du Hui, allowing Wei Ke to capture his enemy. The Jin forces won the battle as a result. Later that night, Wei Ke dreamt about the old man, who told him that he was actually the father of a concubine of Wei Ke's father, Wei Wuzi (魏武子), and he wanted to repay Wei Ke's kindness. Many years ago, Wei Wuzi had a concubine whom he loved dearly but she did not bear him any children. When Wei Wuzi became seriously ill, he told Wei Ke to allow his concubine to remarry after his death. However, when Wei Wuzi's condition worsened, he changed his mind and instructed Wei Ke to have her sacrificed to join him in death. After Wei Wuzi died, Wei Ke did not follow his father's dying wish because he felt that his father was not in a clear state of mind before his death. This story gave rise to the Chinese idiom jie cao xian huan (结草衔环).)

== Descendants ==
Chen Wu had two sons – Chen Xiu (陳脩) and Chen Biao.

Chen Xiu had a personality which resembled his father's. When he was 19 years old, Sun Quan summoned him and appointed him as a Major of Separate Command (別部司馬) and put him in charge of 500 troops. At the time, many newly recruited soldiers were unwilling to serve in the army so they deserted. However, Chen Xiu treated his men well and not a single soldier under him deserted. Sun Quan was surprised and pleased, so he promoted Chen Xiu to Colonel (校尉). In the late 210s, when Sun Quan granted awards to the descendants of his deceased subjects to honour his subjects for their service, Chen Xiu received the title of a Marquis of a Chief Village (都亭侯) in recognition of his father's contributions. He later became a commander in the jiefan (解煩) corps, one of the elite units in Sun Quan's military forces. He died in 229, shortly after Sun Quan proclaimed himself emperor and established the state of Eastern Wu.

Chen Biao was born to one of Chen Wu's concubines. He also served in Eastern Wu. After Chen Biao's death, his son Chen Ao (陳敖) was commissioned as a Major of Separate Command (別部司馬) at the age of 16 and was placed in charge of 400 troops.

When Chen Ao died, his military appointment was inherited by his cousin Chen Yan (陳延), who was Chen Xiu's son. Chen Yan had a younger brother, Chen Yong (陳延), who became a general and received a marquis title.

== In Romance of the Three Kingdoms ==
Although no details were given on how Chen Wu died at the Battle of Xiaoyao Ford in 215, his death was dramatised in chapter 68 of the historical novel Romance of the Three Kingdoms by Luo Guanzhong, which romanticises the historical events before and during the Three Kingdoms period. In the novel, Chen Wu encountered Pang De (who had recently joined Cao Cao's forces) in another battle right after the Battle of Xiaoyao Ford. While fighting with Pang De, he was driven into a valley full of thick vegetation and his sleeve was caught in some tree branches. He was killed by Pang De while attempting to free himself.

== See also ==
- Lists of people of the Three Kingdoms

== Sources ==
- Chen, Shou (3rd century). Records of the Three Kingdoms (Sanguozhi).
- Luo, Guanzhong (14th century). Romance of the Three Kingdoms (Sanguo Yanyi).
- Pei, Songzhi (5th century). Annotated Records of the Three Kingdoms (Sanguozhi zhu).
