= Palestine–Singapore relations =

- Singapore: Palestine

Singapore maintains diplomatic and functional relations with the Palestinian Authority (PA). However, Singapore does not officially recognise Palestine as a sovereign state. Singapore has a Representative Office in Ramallah (West Bank) to support functional engagement and facilitate aid, and manages its relations with the PA via a Non-Resident Representative based in Singapore. Singapore has stated its support for the two-state solution, and would formally recognize a Palestinian state once an effective government is in place that accepts Israel's right to exist and renounces terrorism.

== History ==
=== Recognition ===
Singapore maintains a strong relationship with Israel, but also affirms its commitment to the two-state solution. Singapore supported the Palestinian Liberation Organisation's (PLO) proclamation of the State of Palestine in 1988, saying that the PLO rejected terrorism and recognised Israel's right to exist in peace and security. Singapore was one of 41 countries that abstained from voting on the Resolution 67/19 on "Status of Palestine in the United Nations" on 29 November 2012. The resolution granted Non-Member Observer State status to Palestine. Senior Minister of State Masagos Zulkifli stated that Singapore believes "that only a negotiated settlement consistent with UN Security Council Resolution 242 can provide the basis for a viable, long term solution" and that "both parties have legitimate rights and shared responsibilities, and must be prepared to make compromises to achieve the larger good of a lasting peace".

In May 2024, Singapore was among the 143 nations to vote in favour for Palestine's full membership in the United Nations. Vivian Balakrishnan, the Minister for Foreign Afffairs, stated on 2 July that Singapore could recognize Palestine if it in turn accepted Israel's right to exist. In July 2025, Singapore announced that it was "prepared in principle" to recognize Palestine. Balakrishnan reiterated on 22 September that Singapore will recognise Palestine once it has a competent administration, supports Israel's right to exist, and abandons terrorism. Balakrishnan denied that Singapore is locked into giving Israel "a free pass" despite Israel's "invaluable role" in Singapore's defence.

=== Diplomatic Engagements ===
At the World Economic Forum in January 1994, PLO leader Yasser Arafat cited Singapore as a model for a new Palestinian state. Farouk Kaddoumi, the head of PLO Political Department, visited Singapore in April that year and met with Singapore Foreign Affairs Minister S. Jayakumar, and said the PLO was seeking Singapore's assistance in rebuilding Palestine's economy. In a visit to Israel in May 1994, Senior Minister Lee Kuan Yew recognised Arafat's desire to transform Palestine into the "Singapore of the Middle East" by fostering peaceful coexistence, trade, and mutual investment with Israelis. Based on this vision, Lee said Singapore was prepared to assist in training Palestinians with the necessary skills in trade, industry, banking, and financial services. In the first Middle East/North Africa Economic Summit in November 1994, Arafat called for global support to "build a new Singapore" in Palestine. Singapore expressed condolences to Palestine for the death of Arafat in 2004.

In 2013, Singapore launched the Enhanced Technical Assistance Package (ETAP), offering training programs, study visits, and scholarships to support Palestinians. Singapore's Prime Minister Lee Hsien Loong visited Palestine in April 2016 as part of a wider week-long trip to the Middle East and met with Palestinian Prime Minister Rami Hamdallah. Lee pledged to double the sum of ETAP to Palestine from S$5 million to S$10 million and extended invitations for Hamdallah and President Mahmoud Abbas to visit Singapore. In March 2022, Singapore sent a S$750,000 special healthcare assistance package to the Palestinian Authority (PA). The package included COVID-19 test kits developed by Alliance BioMed and masks donated by Temasek Foundation. Palestinian Prime Minister Mohammad Shtayyeh visited Singapore from 26 to 29 October 2022 – the first such visit by a Palestinian Prime Minister.

In March 2024, Foreign Minister Vivian Balakrishnan met with Palestinian Authority (PA) officials to discuss the Gaza War. Palestinian Finance Minister Estephan Anton Salameh visited Singapore in February 2026.

=== Israel–Palestine conflict ===
During the 2014 Gaza war, Singapore Minister for Foreign Affairs K. Shanmugam said the Palestinian militant organisation Hamas has "deliberately used civilians as [human] shields" and was responsible for rejecting the Egyptian proposal on 15 July 2014 for a ceasefire. In the same speech to the Singapore Parliament, he also said that Hamas had been consistently launching rocket attacks at Israel, numbering over 2,000 missiles at one point, and this was what prompted the start of Israel's operation to destroy these rocket-launching sites, the smuggling tunnels and the munitions stockpiles to prevent attacks on Israel.

Singapore condemned Hamas' rocket and terror attacks on Israel in the October 7 attacks. Home Affairs Minister K. Shanmugam stated on 12 October that such atrocities [by Hamas] "cannot be justified by any rationale" and that "it is possible to deeply sympathise with the plight of the Palestinians, and yet still unequivocally condemn the terrorist attacks carried out in Israel". On 16 October, the government and the Singapore Red Cross (SRC) announced they would contribute over half a million dollars in humanitarian aid to support relief efforts in Gaza.

In a parliamentary address on 22 September 2025, Minister of Foreign Affairs Vivian Balakrishnan and Senior Minister of State for Foreign Affairs Sim Ann acknowledged the report of the UNHRC Commission of Inquiry on Gaza genocide, and noted that the matter was being investigated by the International Court of Justice (ICJ), which they referred to as "the appropriate forum to adjudicate such grave concerns".

== Advocacy for Palestine in Singapore ==
During the 2014 Gaza War, a rally organised by From Singapore to Palestine (FS2P) was held at Hong Lim Park in July to show their solidarity with Gazans. In 2021, the Internal Security Department of Singapore (ISD) foiled an attack plot on the Maghain Aboth Synagogue. The perpetrator was driven primarily by Israel–Palestine conflict.

During the Gaza War in 2023, the Singapore Police Force (SPF) and the National Parks Board (NParks) said they would not permit events and public assemblies related to the war at Speakers' Corner, citing public safety and security concerns. Singapore's Ministry of Home Affairs (MHA) had also advised the public against displaying foreign national emblems linked to the conflict and urged vigilance when contributing to fundraising efforts. The MHA, ISD and the Manpower Ministry also warned foreigners against using the country as a platform to further political causes.

In January 2024, Minister for Home Affairs K Shanmugam stated that the films selected for the Palestine Film Festival, which was held from 12 to 21 January at The Projector at Cineleisure mall, were permitted as the authorities assessed they did not promote violence or enmity against any group. While public rallies on the Gaza War remain prohibited over security concerns, the government encourages constructive engagement through academic discussions and licensed humanitarian efforts. The festival's proceeds were directed to the Singapore Red Cross to support relief operations for civilians in Gaza. In October 2024, a public assembly was held at Marina Barrage to raise awareness of efforts to honour children who died in the Gaza war.

=== Pro-Palestinian Walk at The Istana ===
On 2 February 2024, a public walk was organised to express solidarity with the Palestinian people amid the Gaza War. A group of 70 gathered at outside the Plaza Singapura on Orchard Road before walking to the rear gate of The Istana with watermelon-themed umbrellas. The group's objective was to hand-deliver a sheaf of letters regarding the Palestinian cause to a mail drop-off point at the rear gate. The three organisers were charged in June 2024 under the Public Order Act with organizing a prohibited procession.

The women claimed trial and contested the charges, arguing they had no idea the route along the perimeter of the Istana was a prohibited zone, particularly since it was a standard public pavement with no signage and another group had delivered letters weeks prior without facing prosecution. In October 2025, a Singapore district court acquitted all three women. District Judge John Ng ruled that while they had indeed organized a procession to publicize their cause, the prosecution had failed to prove the mental element of the charge. However, the High Court reversed the acquittal on 30 April 2026 following an appeal by the prosecution. The judge found that the previous judgement erred in law by misapplying the legal test when concluding the trio ought reasonably to have made inquiries that would have revealed the prohibition order.

=== January 2025 protest at National University of Singapore ===
An unauthorised student protest was held at the National University of Singapore (NUS) in January 2025 concerning the Gaza War. Organised by a group called "Students For Palestine Singapore," the demonstration involved placing shoes and a burial shroud at an NUS research building to protest against the university's academic partnerships with the Hebrew University of Jerusalem. The SPF questioned six individuals and seized communication devices and clothing in connection with the protest. Four Instagram accounts – sgacadboycott, sgpforpalestine48, camira.asrori and loveaidsg – claimed the students and alumni were intimidated into silence. The SPF stated that the home visits and device seizures were standard investigative procedures under the Criminal Procedure Code. The organiser of the event was charged in September 2026 with, among other offences, an alleged act prejudicial to racial harmony. The latter charge arose from their leading the chant "From the river to the sea, Palestine will be free" at The Arts & Civil Space in Ubi in February 2024.

=== July 2026 Massive Attack concert ===
In a July 2026 Massive Attack concert at The Star Performing Arts Centre, band members shouted "Free Palestine", prompting audience members to join the chant, while two members were seen holding a Palestinian flag during the performance. The SPF and Infocomm Media Development Authority (IMDA) opened investigations into the incident, with IMDA investigating "a possible breach of licence conditions". The two band members were issued stern warnings for violating the Foreign National Emblems (Control of Display) Act and the Public Order Act, and they have been banned from re-entering Singapore. Furthermore, the IMDA stated that it will reject any future application for the group to perform in the country. The band expressed surprise and disappointment after alleging they had been detained, questioned, and subjected to hotel room searches, though they stated they were proud to stand in solidarity with their Singaporean fans and the Palestinian cause.

In September, Senior Minister of State for Digital Development and Information Tan Kiat How said that Singapore allows artists to express concern over the humanitarian impact of global conflicts provided their work does not undermine public order, national security or stability. He reiterated that foreigners are not allowed to use Singapore as a platform to advance political causes concerning overseas conflicts. Tan cited three performances on social causes that had been permitted: To The Unforgotten, an R18 production staged in May that addressed the Israel–Gaza conflict through music, poetry and multimedia; 6 Microlectures On Genocides, an R18 production exploring genocide, war crimes and contemporary conflicts; and the Advisory 16-rated stand-up comedy Namaste, which included a segment on the Israel–Gaza conflict.

== Representative office ==
Singapore established a representative office in Ramallah in March 2022 as a move to improve coordination of capacity-building initiatives and fortify relations with the Palestinian National Authority. Singapore's non-resident Representative to the PA is Hawazi Daipi, who has been appointed to the position since 2016.
