= Cheang Hong Lim =

Singaporean Chinese headman

Cheang Hong Lim JP
- 章芳林
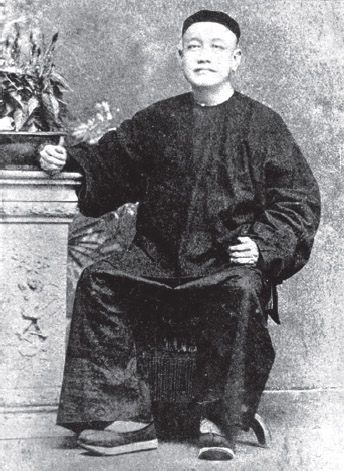
- Born: 1841; Singapore, Straits Settlements
- Died: 11 February 1893 (aged 51–52); Singapore, Straits Settlements
- Resting place: Cheang Family Private Cemetery, Alexandra Road (1893–1961); Bukit Brown Cemetery (since 1961)
- Occupation: Merchant
- Spouses: Bek Chit Boey Neo; Yeo Bin Neo
- Children: 3 daughters, 11 sons
- Parents: Cheang Sam Teo (father); Bek E Neo (mother)
- Honours: Ronglu mandarin 榮祿大夫

Chinese name
- Chinese: 章芳林 / 章芳琳
- Hokkien POJ: Chiang Hong-lîm
Transcriptions
Standard Mandarin
- Hanyu Pinyin: Zhāng Fānglín
- Wade–Giles: Chang^{1} Fang^{1}-Lin^{2}
- IPA: [ʈʂáŋ fáŋ.lǐn]
Southern Min
- Hokkien POJ: Chiang Hong-lîm

Wan Seng (courtesy name)
- Chinese: 苑生
- Hokkien POJ: Oán-sing
Transcriptions
Standard Mandarin
- Hanyu Pinyin: Yuànshēng
Southern Min
- Hokkien POJ: Oán-sing

Sik Yong (posthumous name)
- Traditional Chinese: 錫庸
- Simplified Chinese: 锡庸
- Hokkien POJ: Sek-iông
Transcriptions
Standard Mandarin
- Hanyu Pinyin: Xìyōng
Southern Min
- Hokkien POJ: Sek-iông

Cheang Hong Lim (Note: In this Chinese name, the family name is Cheang and Hong is a generation name.) JP (1841 – 11 February 1893) was a Chinese opium merchant and philanthropist in Singapore. He was recognised by the British colonial administration as head of the local Hokkien Chinese community.

== Biography ==
Cheang was born to Cheang Sam Teo, a Chinese migrant from the Changtai District of southern Fujian, China. He was the eldest of four sons born to his mother Bek E Neo. When his father died, his brother Cheang Hong Guan filed a lawsuit against Cheang (and against Wee Bock Seng, Low Thuan Locke and Tan Beng Chie) alleging forgery of his father's will. Cheang, Wee, Low and Tan were acquitted.

Like his father before him, Cheang sold spirits, but further extended his business to include opium and held one of five opium licenses in Singapore, but quickly expanded his business interests to include property. His main business partners were Tan Seng Poh and Tan Yeok Nee, initially trading under the name "Chop Teang Wat Wan Kee" on Telok Ayer Street and later "Chop Wan Seng".

He is remembered primarily for his philanthropy. In 1876, he donated $900 to the Portuguese Mission Church of St Jose. Also in 1876, he donated $3000 to convert the land in front of the Police Office to become a public garden, and to supply two gardeners to maintain the grounds thereafter. This is the garden known as Hong Lim Green. In 1878, he donated $2,750 to purchase the land on Pyeleang Road for the use by a mosque. He established a fire brigade for the Havelock Road area in 1886. Giok Hong Tian, (Chinese: 玉皇殿), a Taoist temple dedicated to the Jade Emperor along Havelock Road was built by Cheang in 1887. He was also patron to the young Lim Boon Keng, at the request of Richmond William Hullett, the then principal of Raffles Institution, .

He sat on the Singapore legislative council, was made one of five Chinese Justices of the Peace in 1872, and was conferred the title of Ronglu mandarin (Chinese: 榮祿大夫) of the Imperial Qing court. He was prominent in Singapore society and entertained the Governor of Singapore and the Sultan of Johor at his home on Havelock Road.

Cheang died on 14 February 1893, from cardiac complications of rheumatic fever. Cheang had 3 daughters and 11 sons. Three of his sons, Cheang Jim Hean, Cheang Jim Chuan, Cheang Jim Khean, had roads in Singapore named after them.

== Legacy ==
There are a number places in Singapore named for Cheang :

- Hong Lim Green (later Hong Lim Park)
- Hong Lim Market
- Cheang Wan Seng Place

There were formerly a number of places in Singapore named for Cheang:

- Hong Lim Quay (now part of Alkaff Quay)
- Cheang Hong Lim Street (used to run from Telok Ayer Street to Cecil Street, where China Square Food Centre is now)
- Cheang Hong Lim Lane (used to run from Pearl's Hill Road to Covent Market)
- Cheang Wan Seng Road (used to run from Havelock Road to Beng Hoon Road)

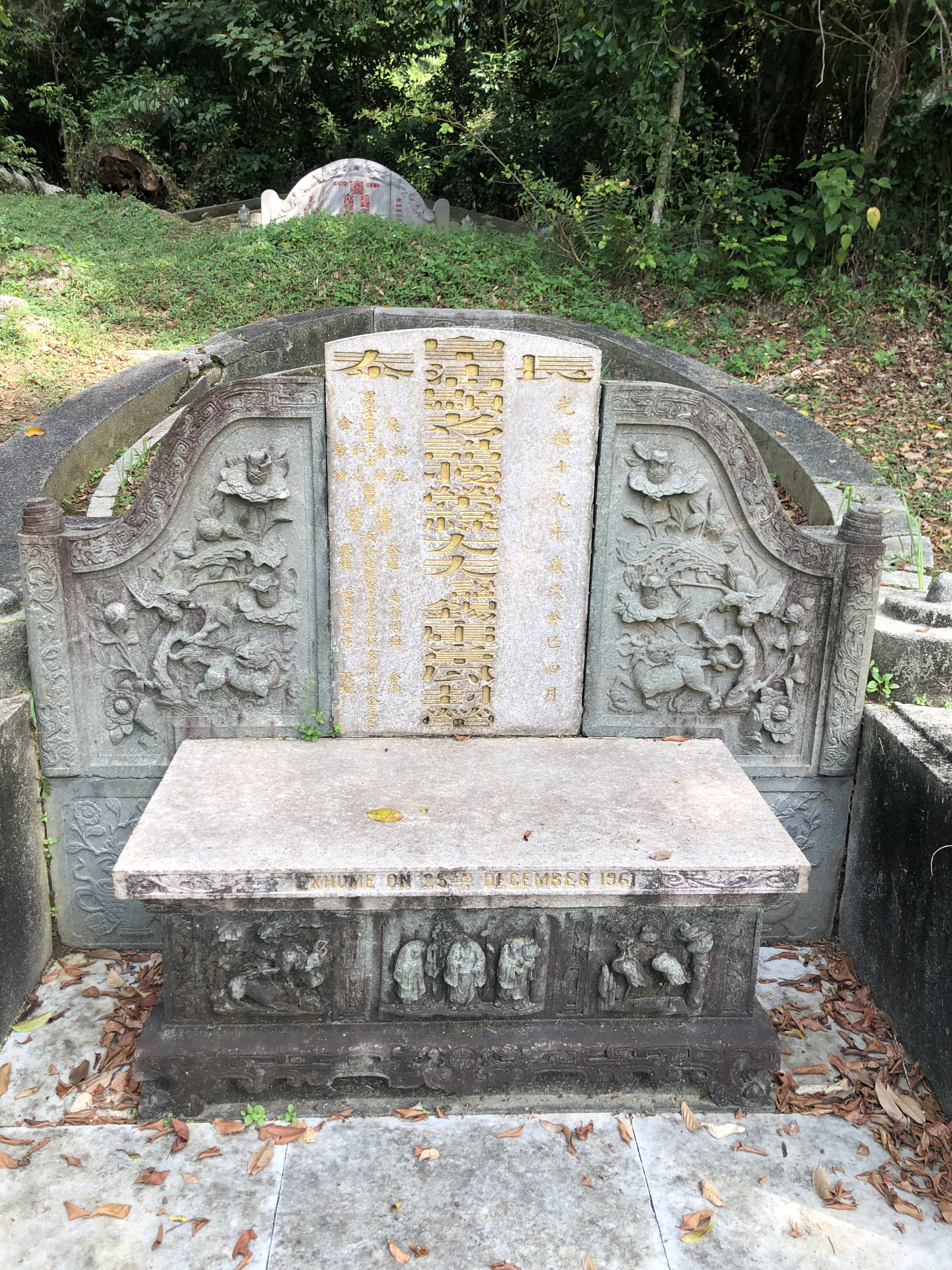
Tomb of Cheang Hong Lim

Cheang Hong Lim was buried at the Cheang family cemetery off Alexandra Road, but was exhumed and reburied in 1961 at Bukit Brown by his granddaughter Cheang Tew Muey.
