= Kreta Ayer Neighbourhood Police Post =

Police post in North Canal Road, Singapore

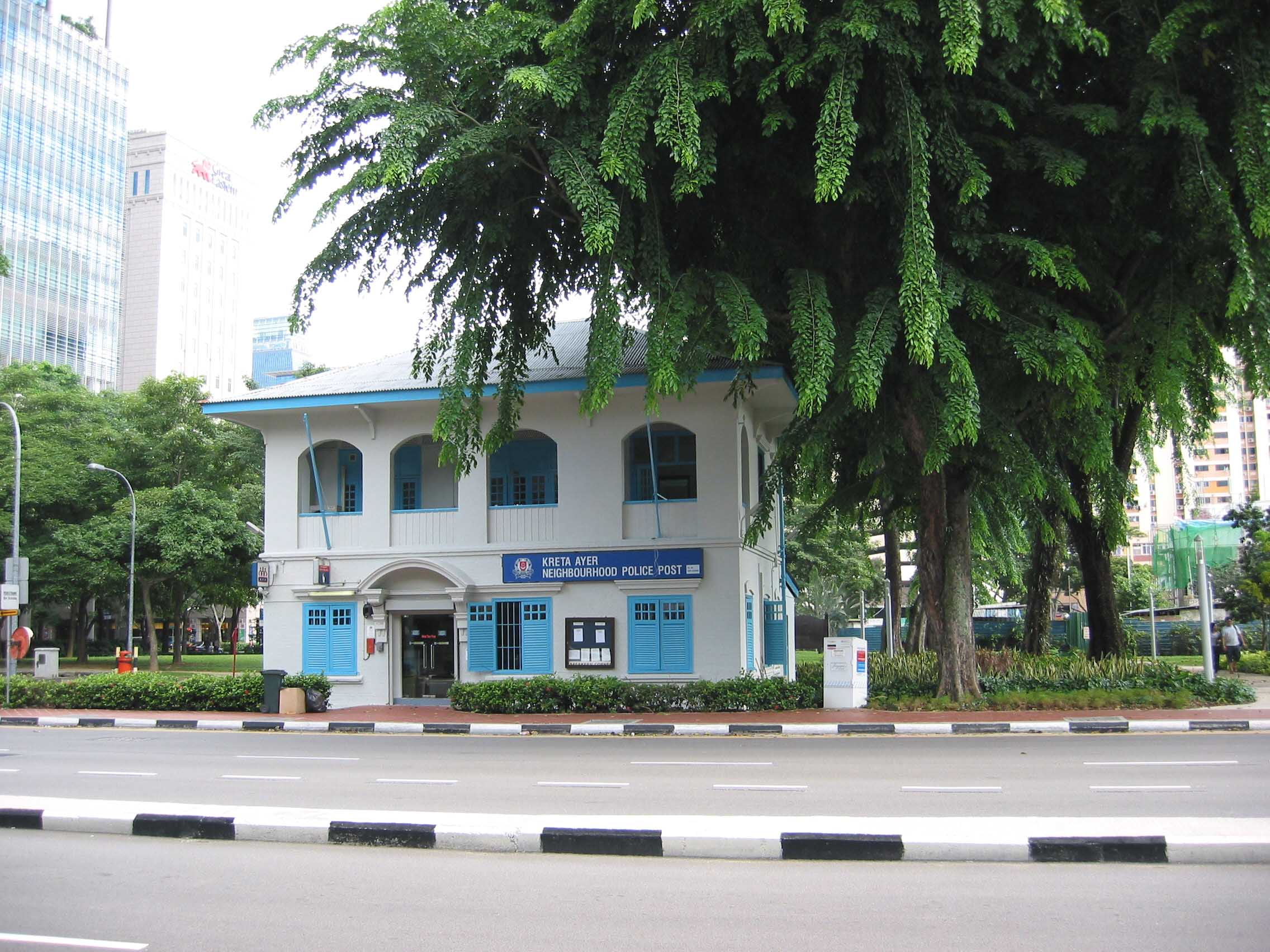
The post in 2016

Kreta Ayer Neighbourhood Police Post, formerly the North Canal Road Post Office, is a neighbourhood police post on North Canal Road serving the Kreta Ayer Precinct in Chinatown, Singapore.

== History ==
The North Canal Road Post Office was opened in 1908. It was built in the standard post office design used by the British Colonial Administration. It features a decorative arch and two large moulded brackets, as well as a hip roof. It was closed from 1972 to 1973 due to renovations. In 1988, it was closed as it had been replaced by a newer post office on nearby Pickering Street. The building was initially to be demolished. However, it was instead reopened as the Kreta Ayer Neighbourhood Police Post on 15 January 1990, becoming the first neighbourhood police post within the Central Business District. By 1995, crime rates in the surrounding area had fallen by about twenty percent. As it was located between the Ministry of Labour building and the Pidemco Centre which housed the Singapore Immigration Department, the post was a popular place to report loss of work permits or passports. It was amongst the busiest neighbour police posts, averaging around 600 reports a month. Beginning in 2000, those wishing to hold an event at the nearby Speakers' Corner were required to apply for a permit at the post.

The post is the only two-storey police post in Singapore. The building was placed on the Police Heritage Trail, which was launched on 26 November 2020.
