= Hong Lim Park =

Park in Singapore

- Dunman's Green; Hong Lim Green
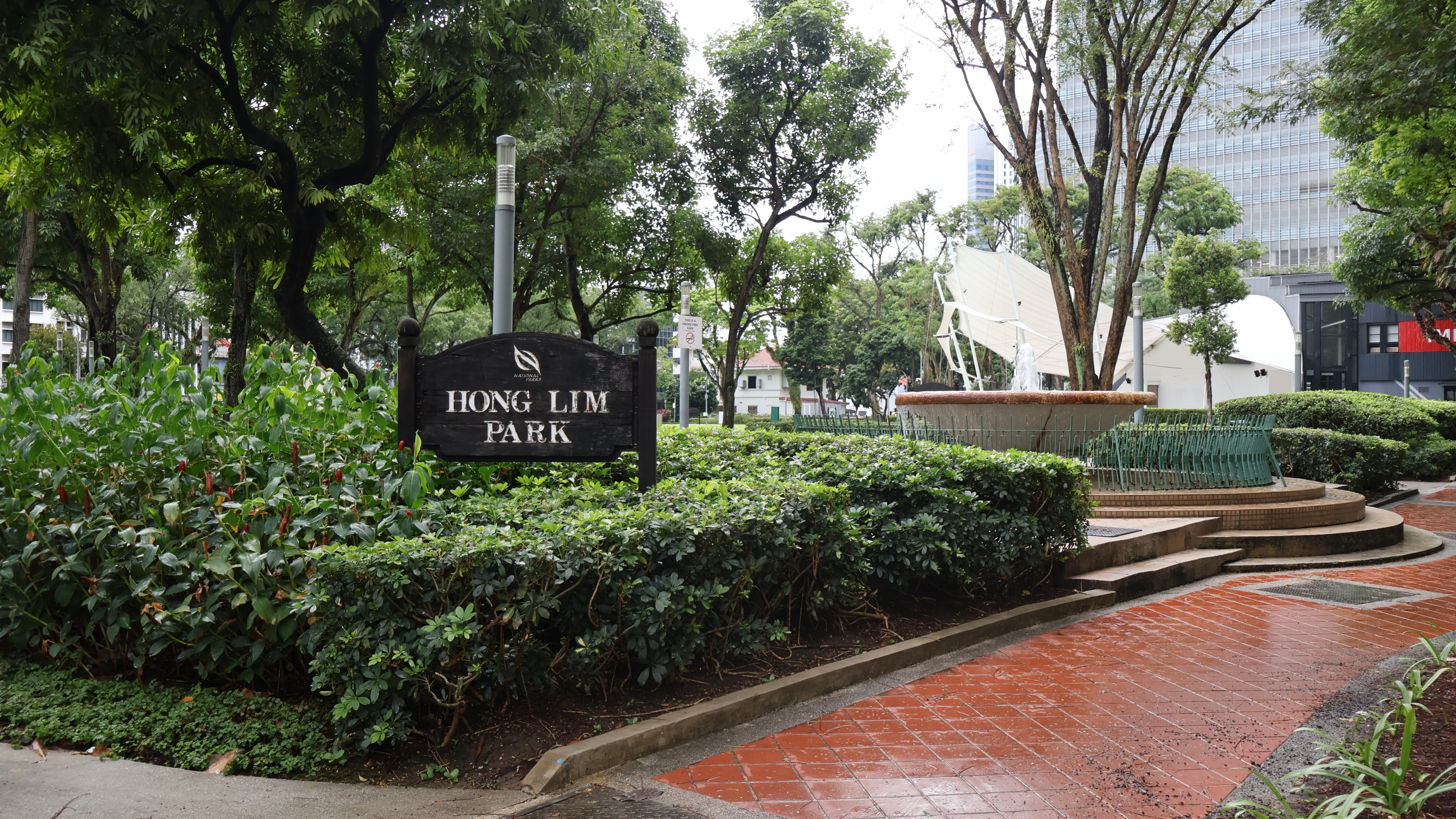
- Hong Lim Park in February 2026

- Location within Singapore
- Type: Heritage Park
- Location: Singapore
- Coordinates: 1°17′12″N 103°50′47″E
- Area: 0.94 ha (9,400 m^{2})
- Authorized: Singapore Government
- Designated: 1 September 2000; 26 years ago
- Owner: National Parks Board
- Administrator: National Parks Board
- Operator: National Parks Board
- Open: 24 Hours
- Status: Open
- Public transit: NE5 Clarke Quay
- Facilities: Outdoor cinema, Public toilet

Hong Lim Park, (Note: Malay: Taman Hong Lim, traditional Chinese: 芳林公園; simplified Chinese: 芳林公园; pinyin: Fānglín Gōngyuán; Pe̍h-ōe-jī: Hong-lîm Kong-hn̂g) formerly known as Hong Lim Green and Dunman's Green, is a 0.94-hectare (2.3-acre) heritage park in the Downtown Core district of Singapore located next to the Parkroyal Collection Pickering hotel and Clarke Quay station.

The park is notable locally as being the country's Speakers' Corner, whereby Singaporeans are able to freely engage in political open-air public speeches, debates and discussions.

== History ==
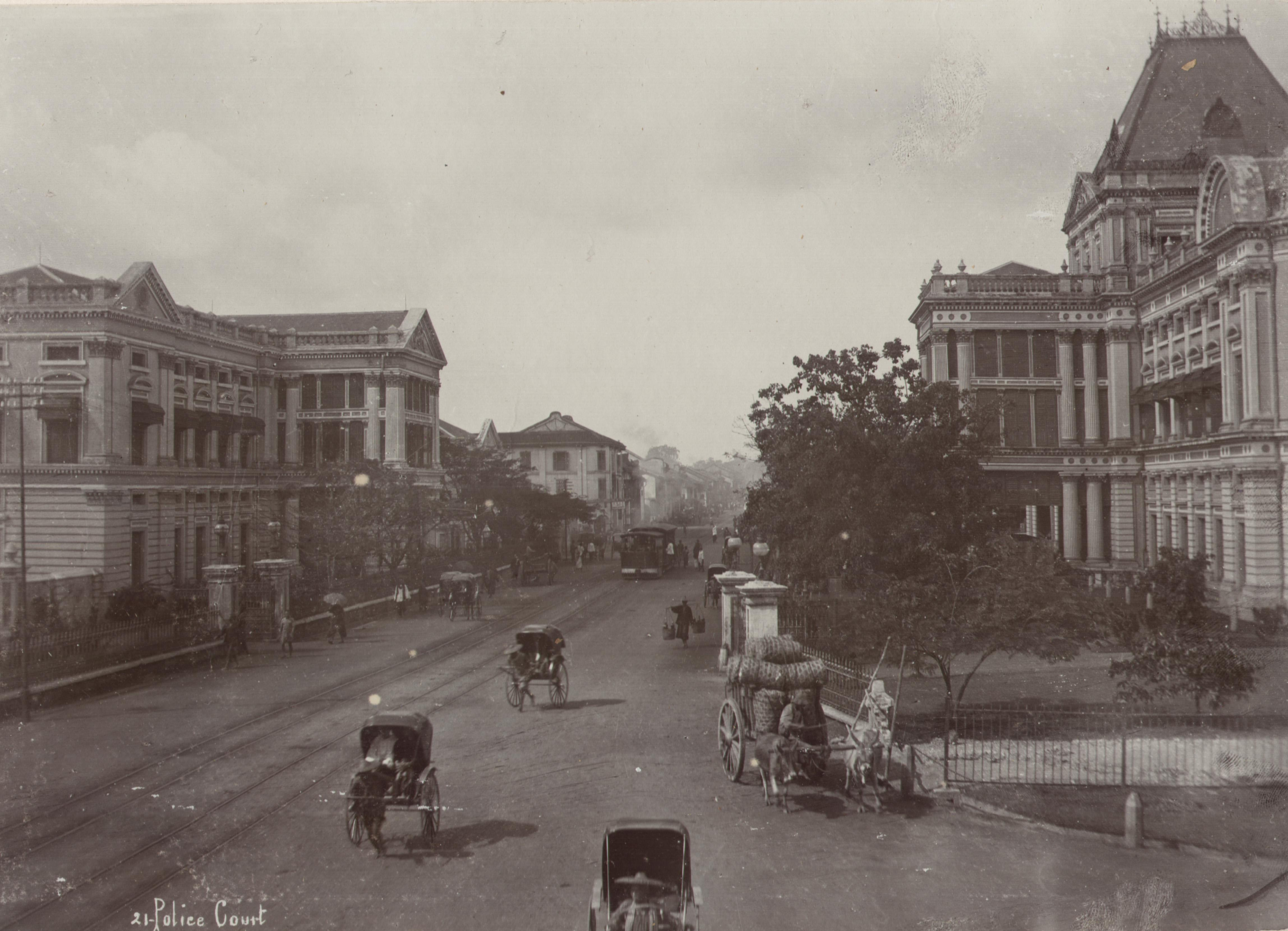
Police Courts (right), known as the Criminal District and Magistrates' Courts at Hong Lim Green, Singapore, demolished in 1975

=== Early years ===
Dunman's Green was one of the earliest public parks in Singapore. It was named after the first Superintendent of Police Thomas Dunman who retired in 1871. In 1876, it was renamed as Hong Lim Green in honour of Cheang Hong Lim (Chinese: 章芳林; Pe̍h-ōe-jī: Chiang Hong-lîm; pinyin: Zhāng Fāng Lín), a wealthy Chinese Hokkien businessman and philanthropist who bought and donated the land to the government.

In 1885, a Mansard roofed Police Courts building, known as the Criminal District and Magistrates' Courts, was built on the grounds of the park. The North Canal Post Office was also built in the area, which was situated closer to the North Canal Road, while the Police Courts building was situated closer to the South Bridge Road. The first Straits Chinese Recreation Club clubhouse was built at the centre of the park; an octagonal pavilion designed by H.D. Richards, it was officially opened to members by Chinese consul Tso Ping Lung on 2 July 1887. In 1914, the original clubhouse was demolished for the construction of a new pavilion, which had improved lighting and facilities and had its entrance facing New Bridge Road.

Hong Lim Green would start its first storytelling tradition during the Japanese occupation of Singapore in the 1940s. After the war, it was used as a cricket ground by members of the Singapore Chinese Recreation Club and the Singapore Cricket Club, and was also the venue for many of the first political speeches and election rallies in the 1950s. In 1951, two courthouses which were meant to be temporary were built near the Criminal District and Magistrates' Courts.

With Singapore Chinese Recreation Club vacated the premises on 31 July 1959 and moved to Shenton Way, its former clubhouse's demolition started on the following day to make way for new developments.

=== Refurbishment ===
Hong Lim Green was refurbished by the City Council of Singapore, with new grass turf, a sand-filled children's playground, a fountain, park facilities, and an open-air theatre built at a cost of S$173,000, it was renamed to Hong Lim Park and officially reopened by S. Rajaratnam on 23 April 1960. On the following day, the Telok Ayer Hong Lim Green Community Centre, which was behind the open-air theatre, was officially opened by Dr Goh Keng Swee.

The storytelling tradition was once again resumed in another medium as Chinese operas were performed at the open-air theatre from the 1960s to 1970s. The park had also become an attractive location for cultural shows, outdoor movie screenings and election rallies once again.

The Criminal District and Magistrates' Courts and the two temporary courthouses, which had remained at the park for 90 years and 24 years respectively, were demolished soon after the Subordinate Courts was opened for operation on 15 September 1975, the site of the former police courts building is currently an empty field with a toilet facility to cater as part of the event venue. The park's playground had since been removed.

The former North Canal Post Office had been renovated and converted into the Kreta Ayer Neighbourhood Police Post in the late 1980s. From September 2000, it also serves as a registration centre for anyone who wishes to give speeches or set up events at the Speakers' Corner.

In 2005, the Hong Lim Park Open Stage was refurbished to incorporate a modern-looking pure Teflon tentage that preserved the historical stage layout of the 1950s.

== Speakers' Corner ==
Hong Lim Park was selected by the government as the venue for Speakers' Corner on 1 September 2000. Since then, it is currently the only venue in Singapore where one can legally stage public protests.

== Gallery ==
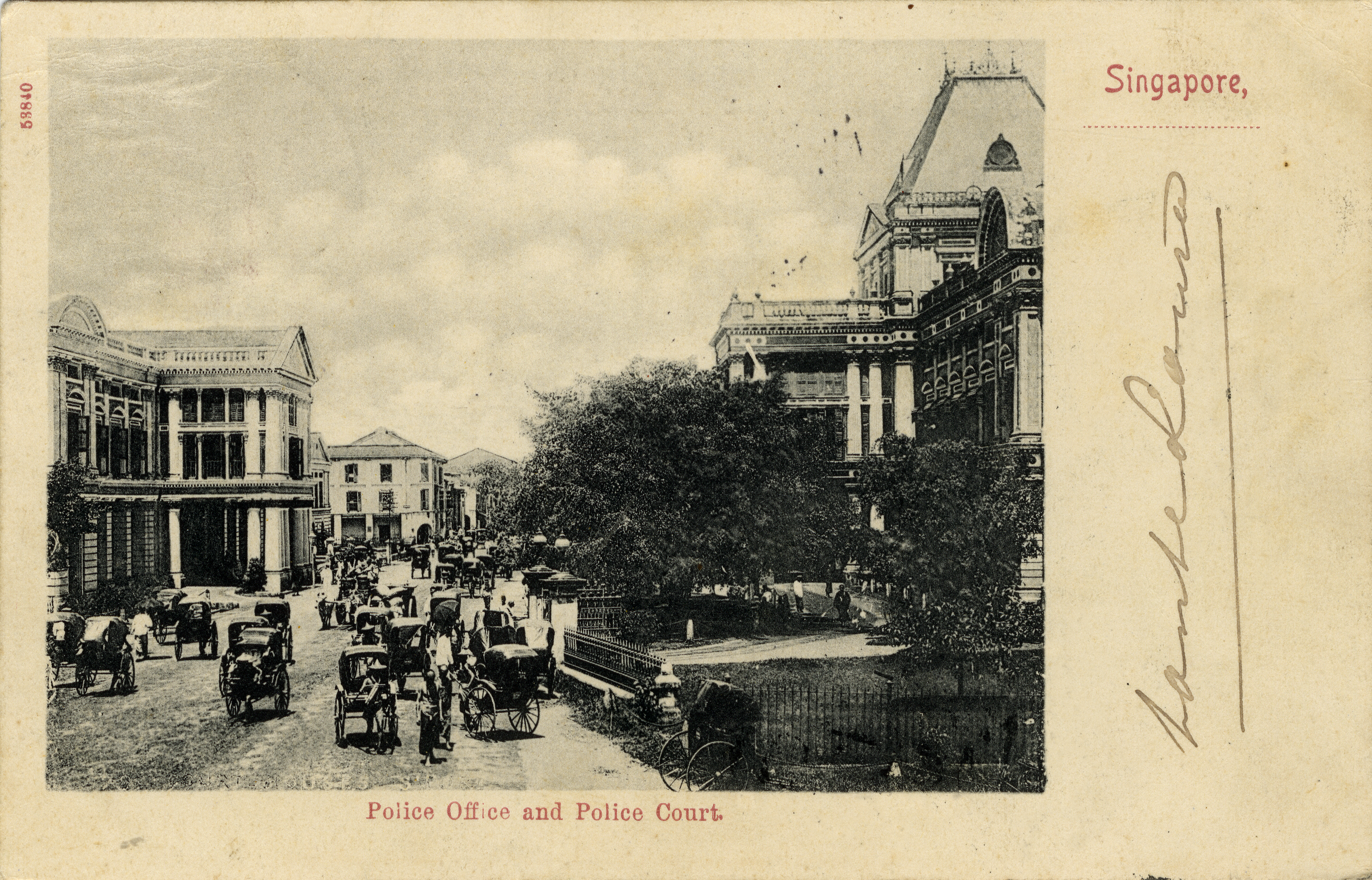

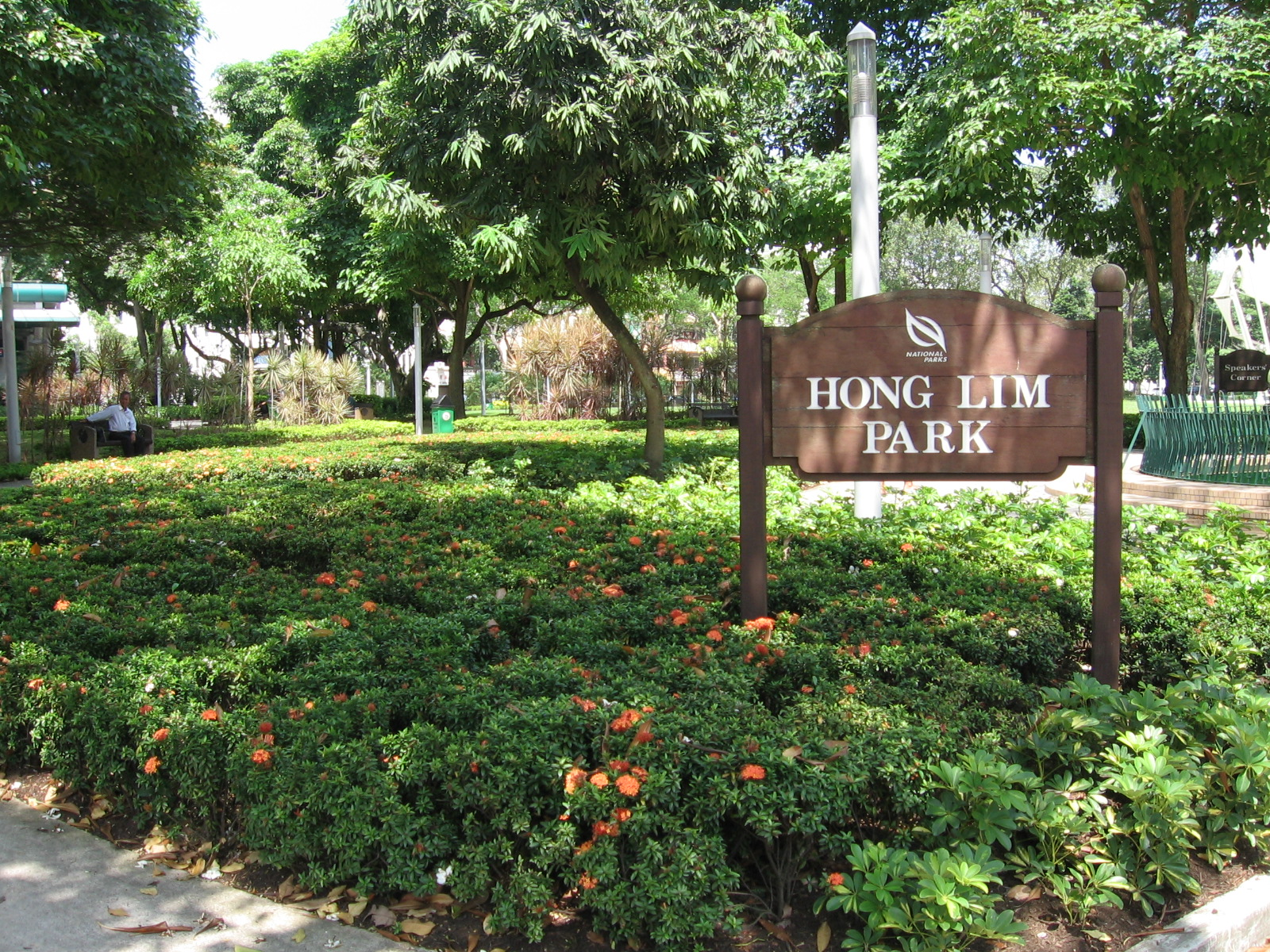

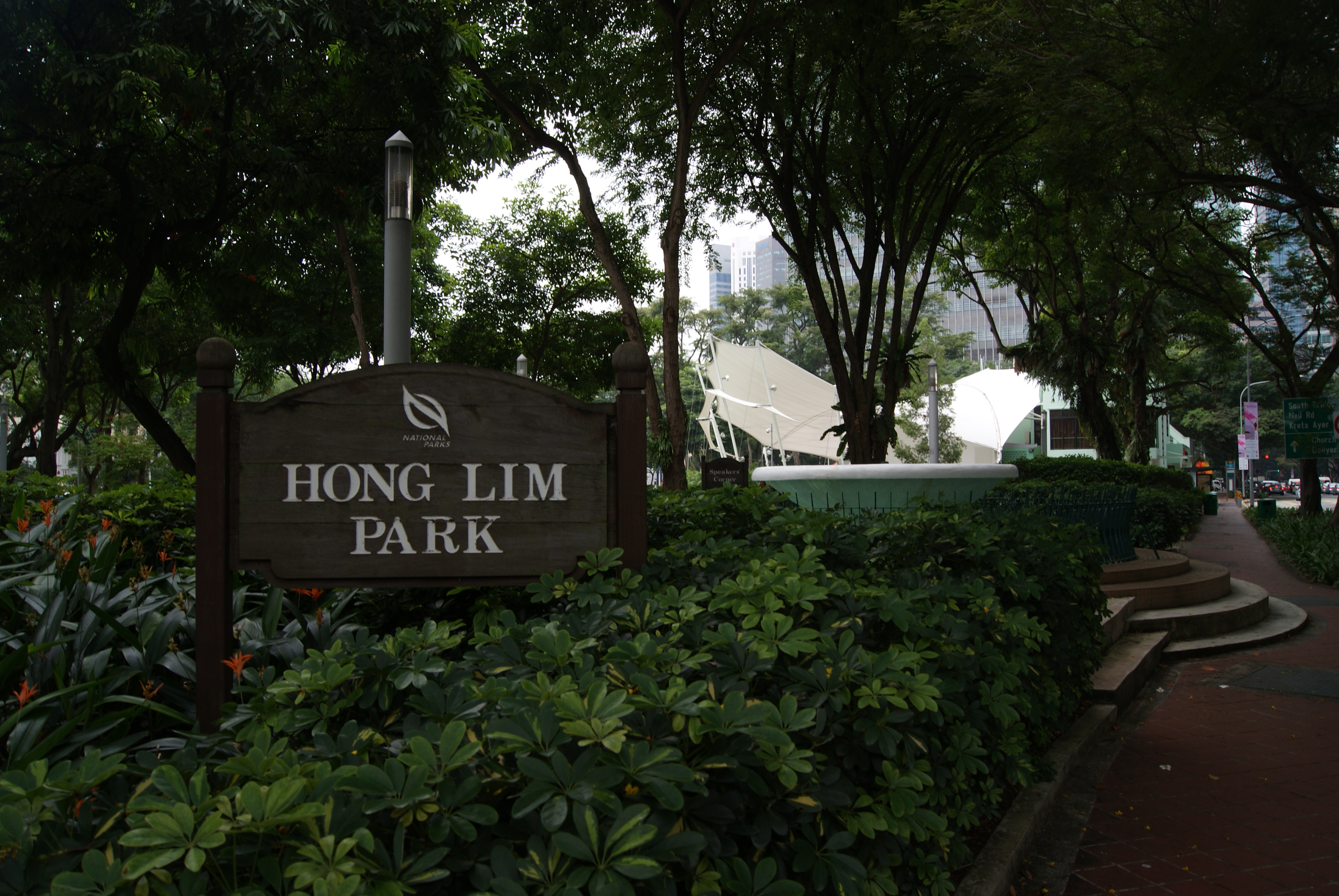

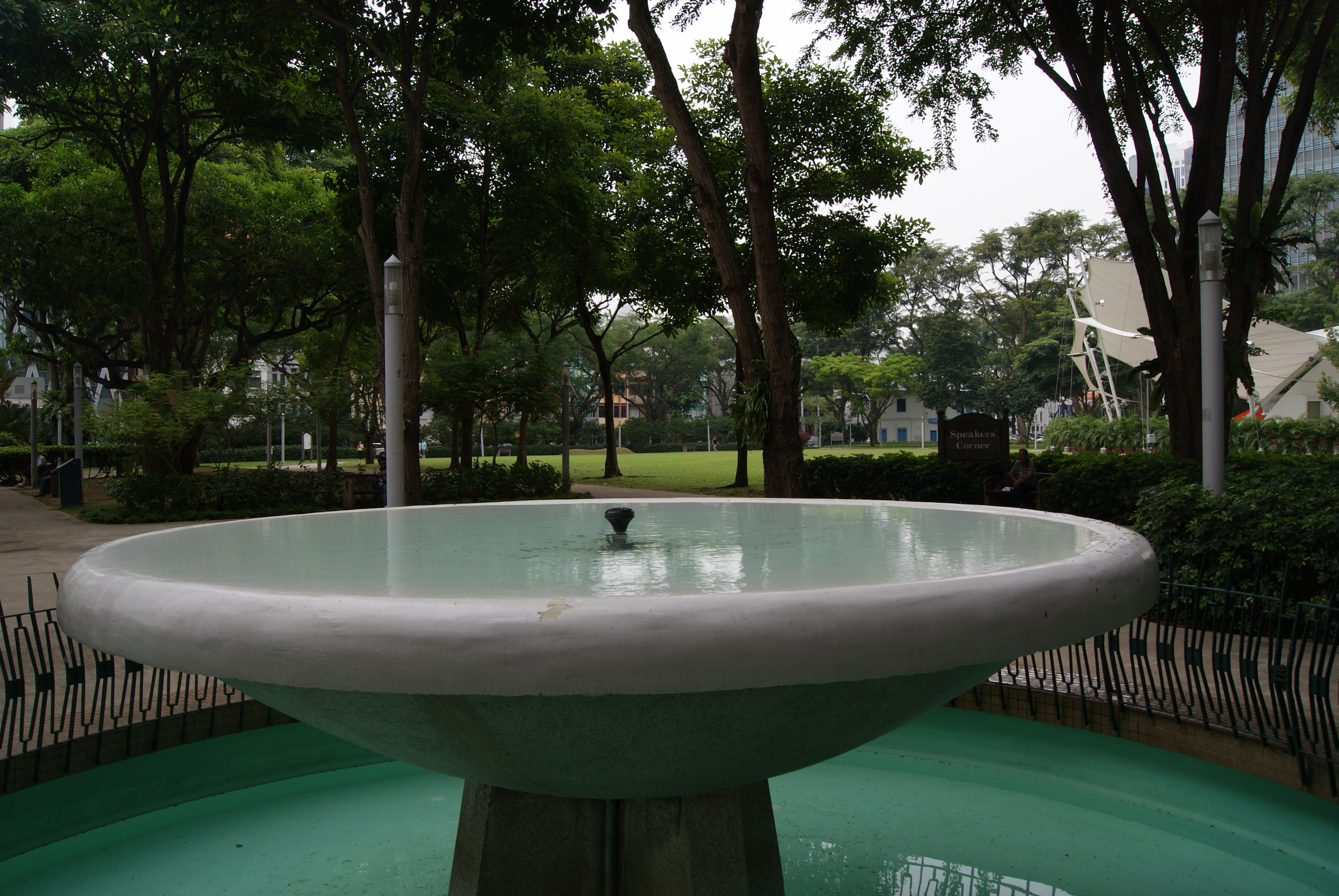
Fountain at Hong Lim Park.

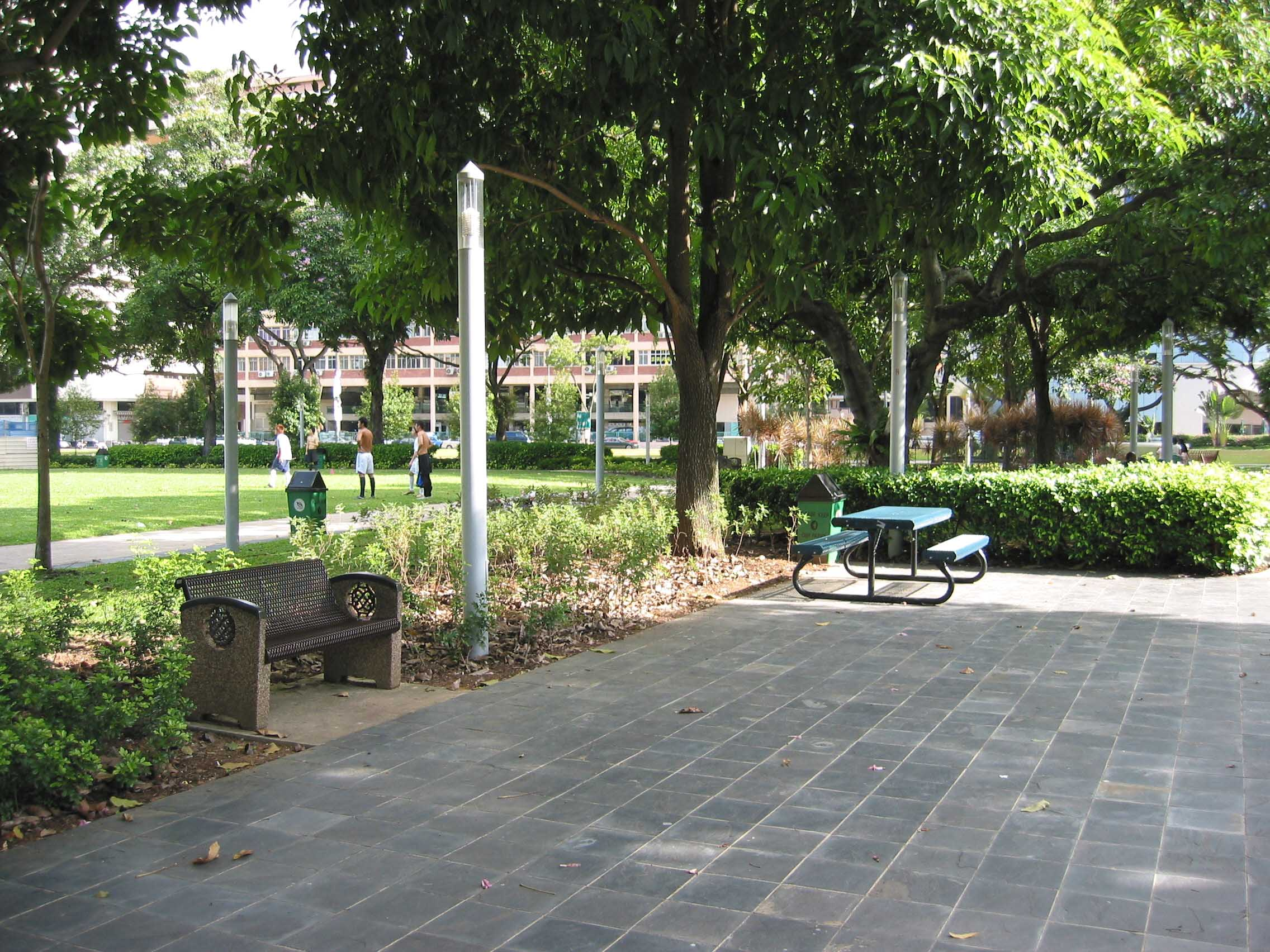

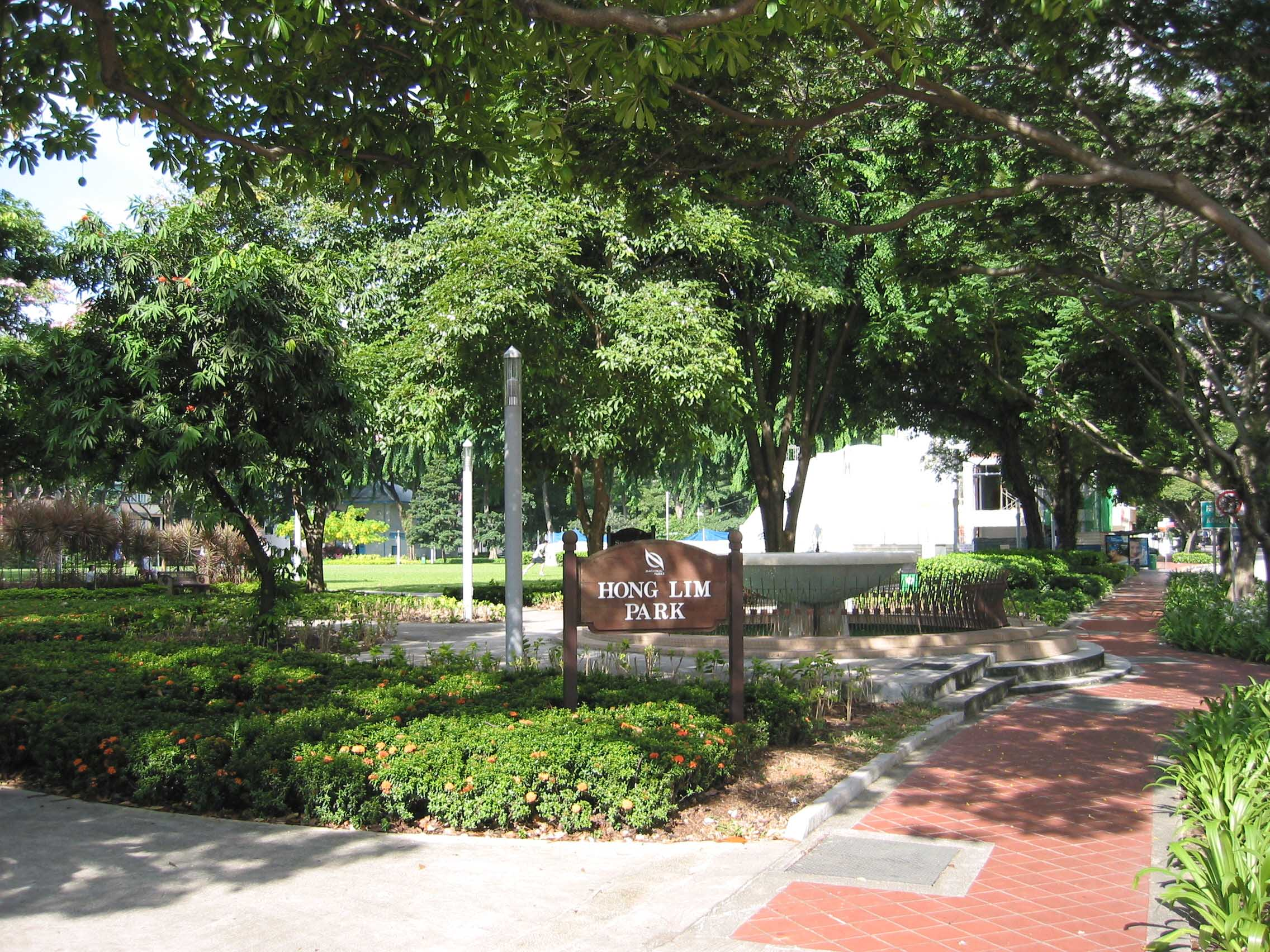

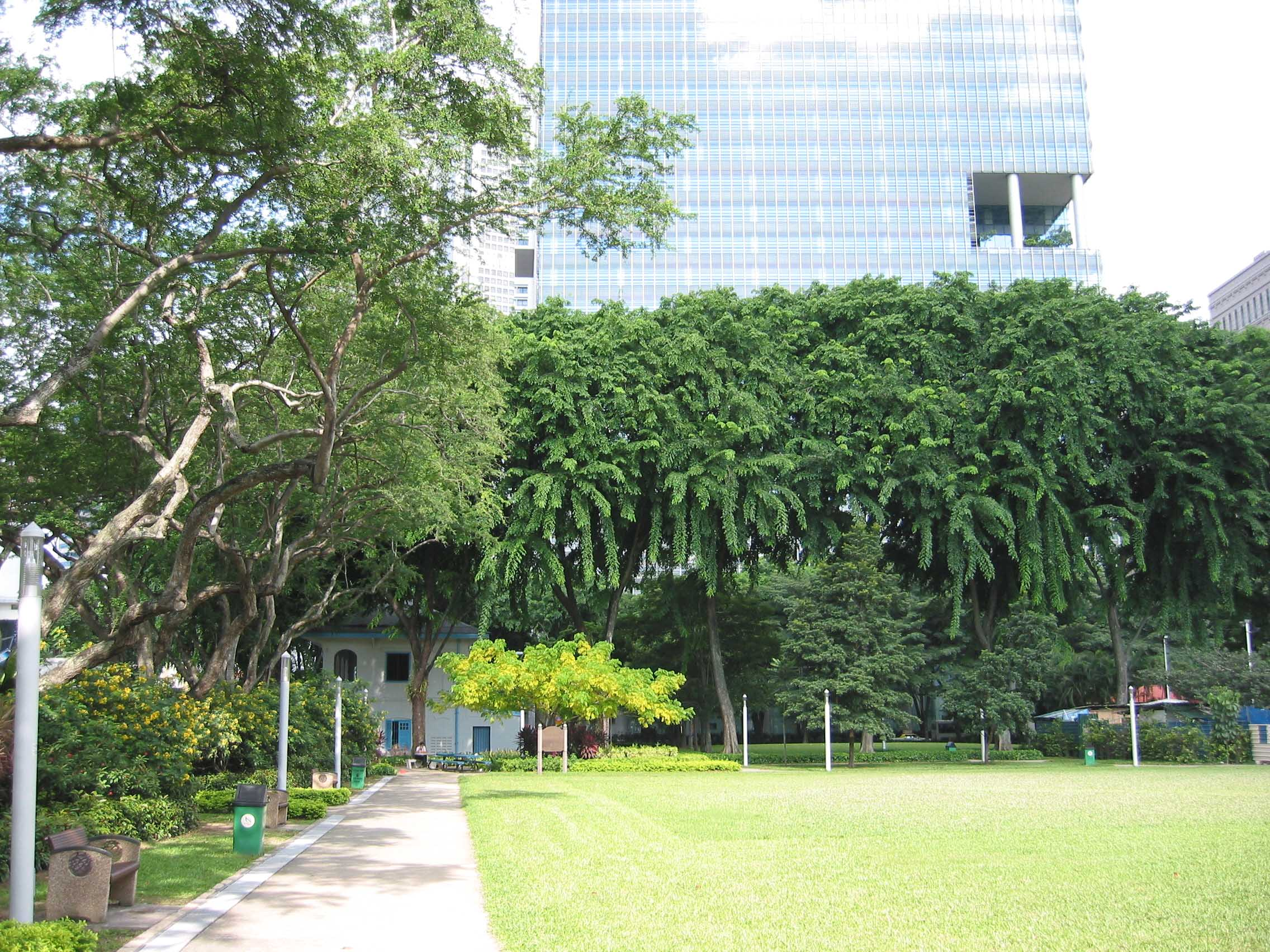

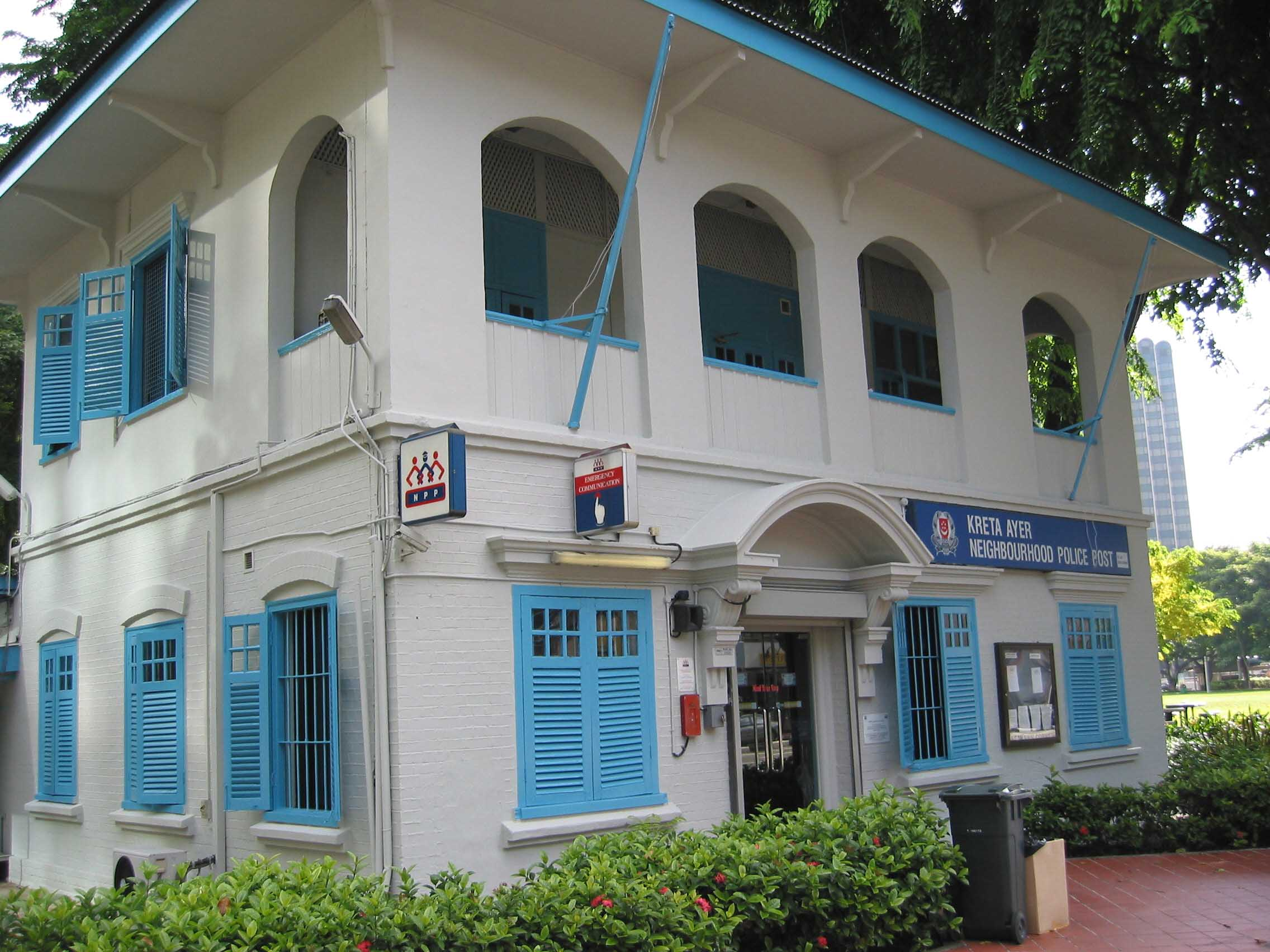
Former North Canal Post Office, currently North Canal Neighbourhood Police Post

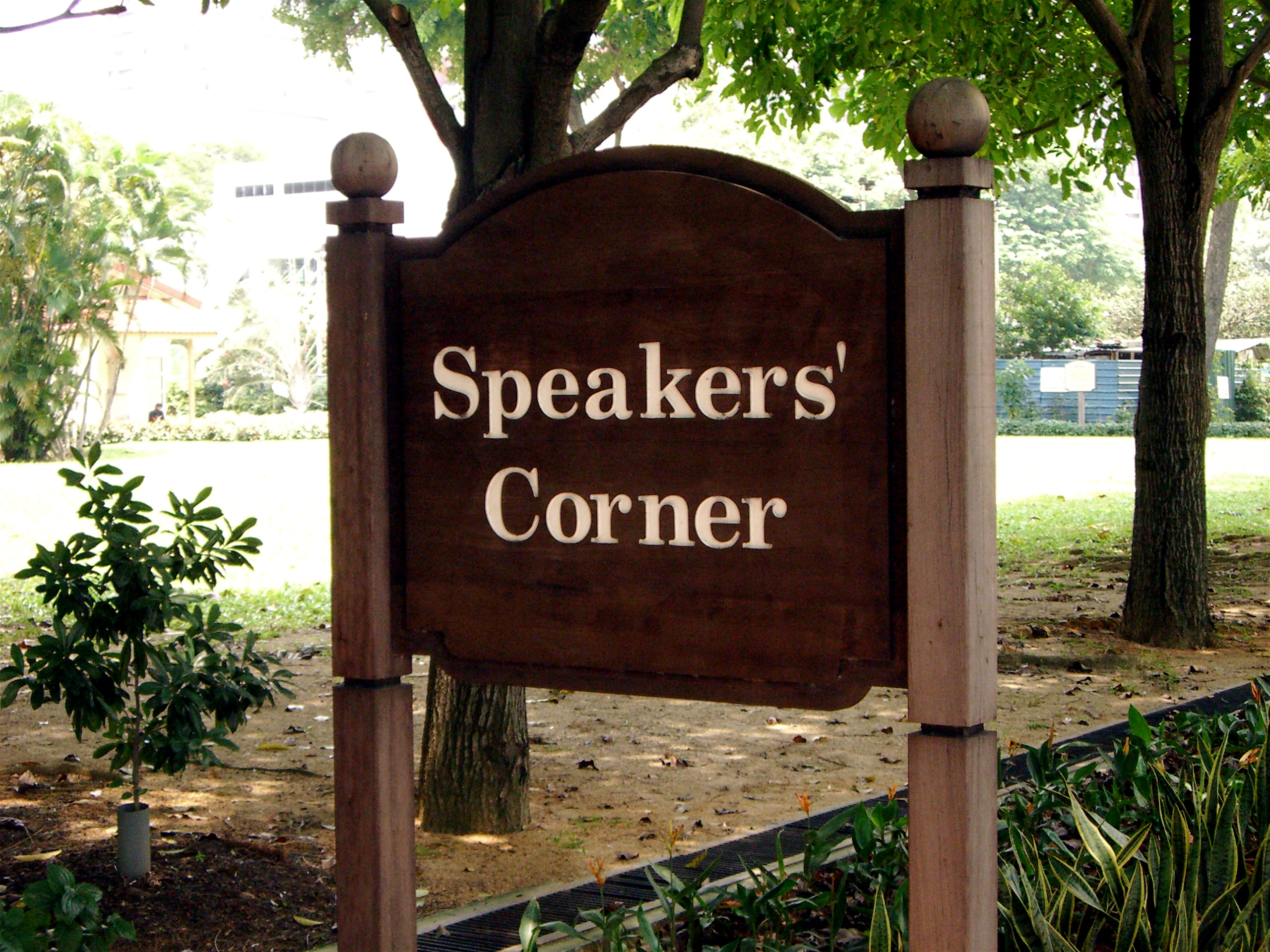
Speakers' Corner sign

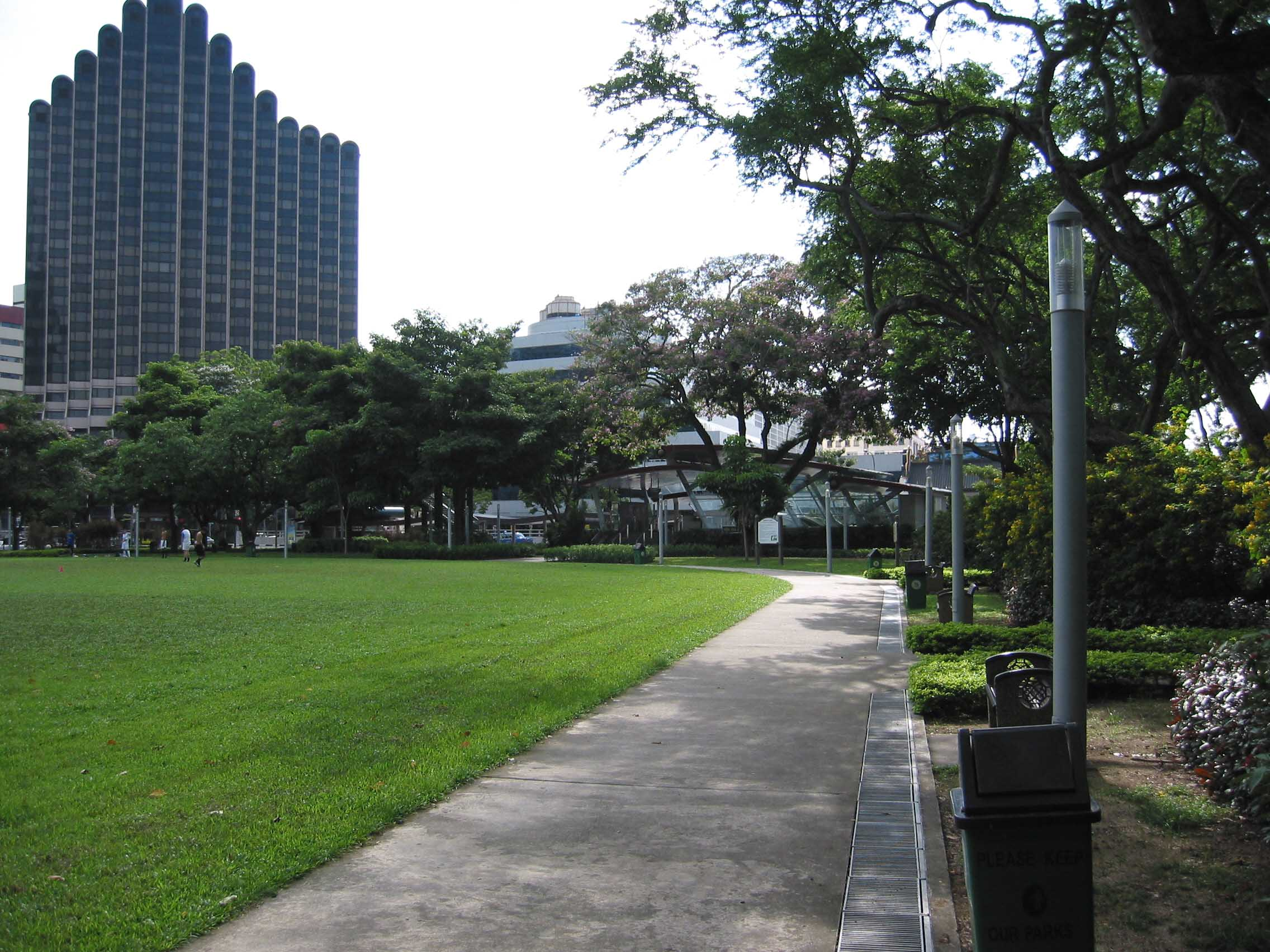

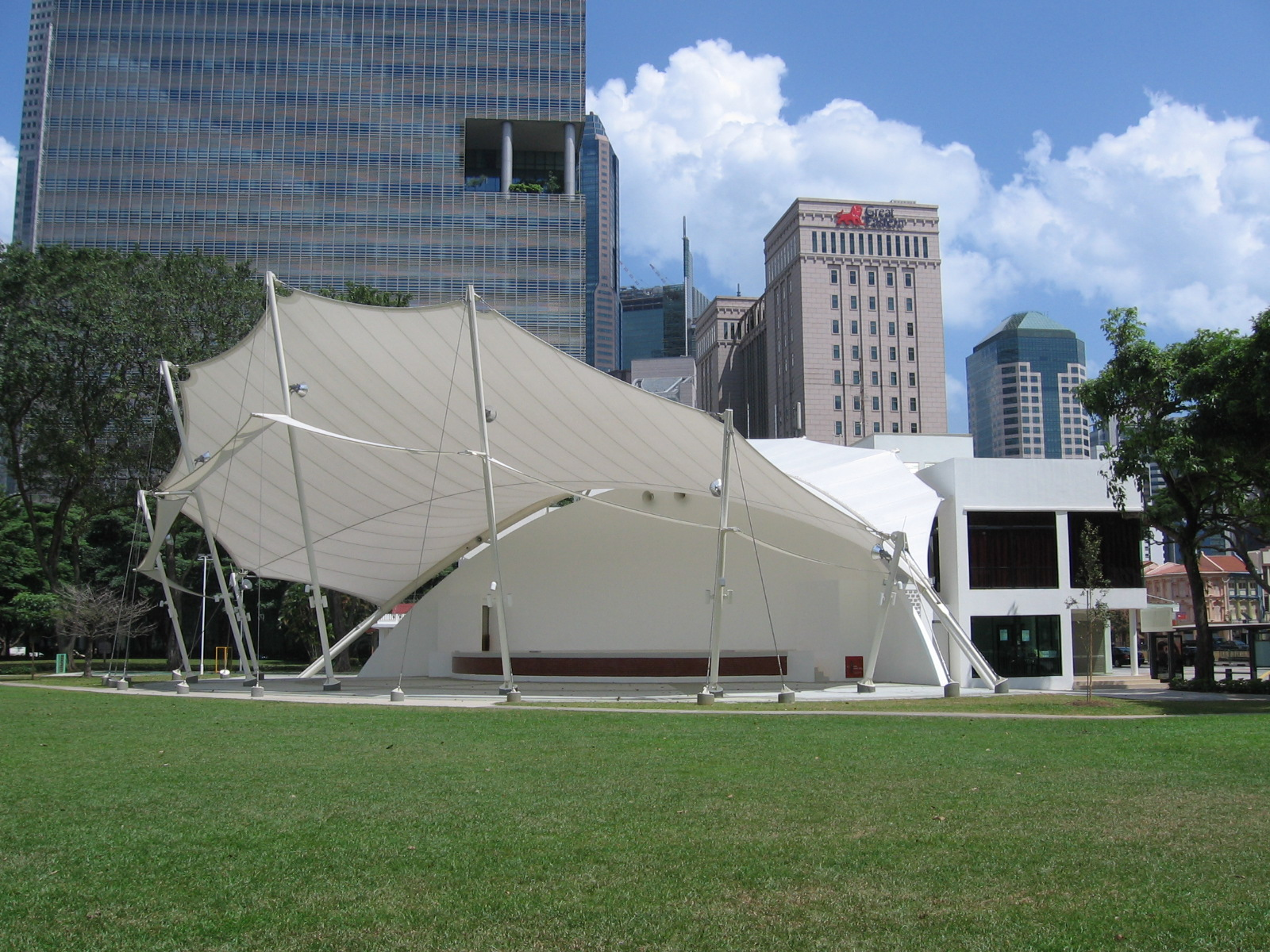
Open air theatre, behind Telok Ayer Hong Lim Green Community Centre.

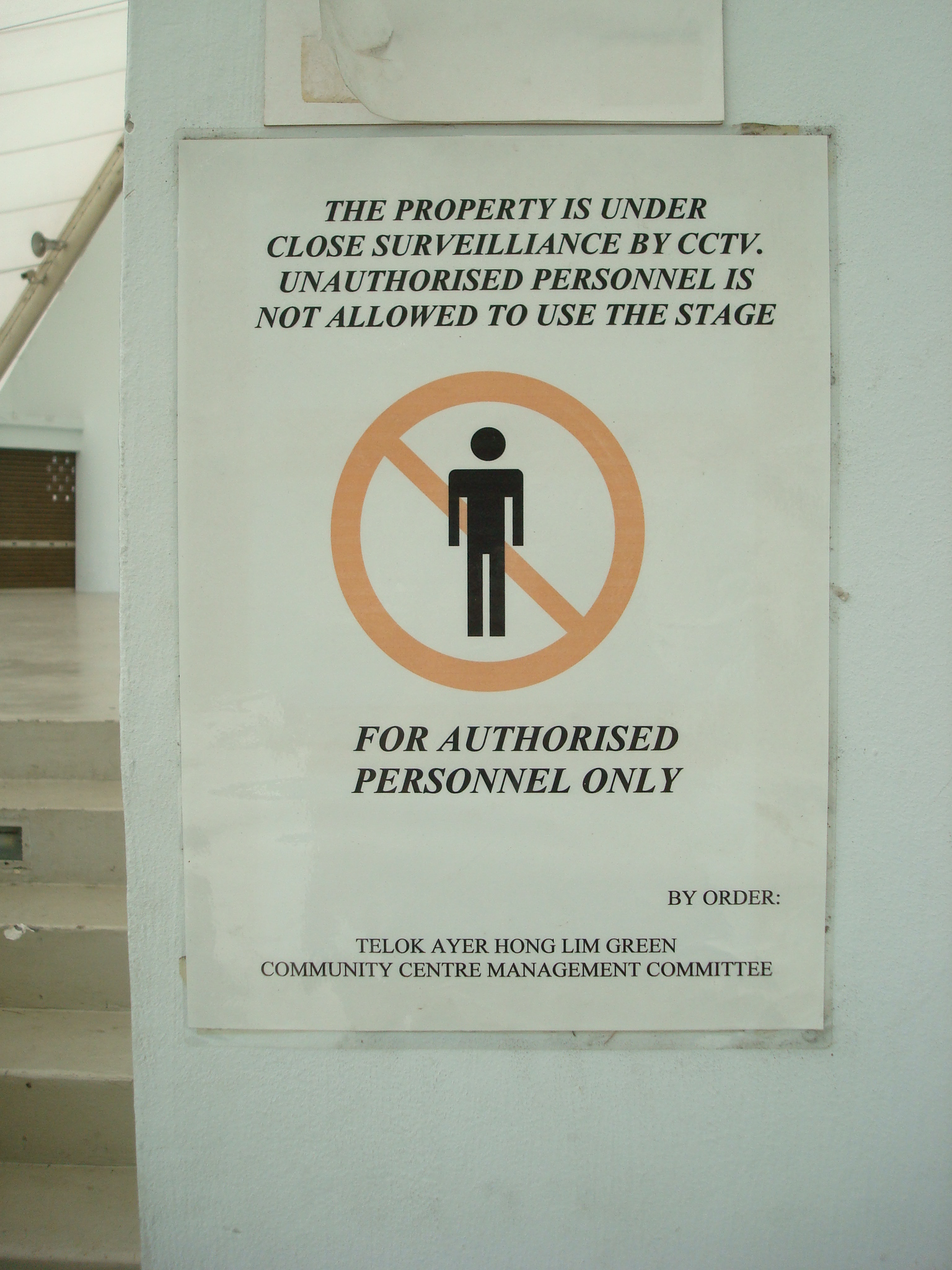
Notice at stage, behind Telok Ayer Hong Lim Green Community Centre.

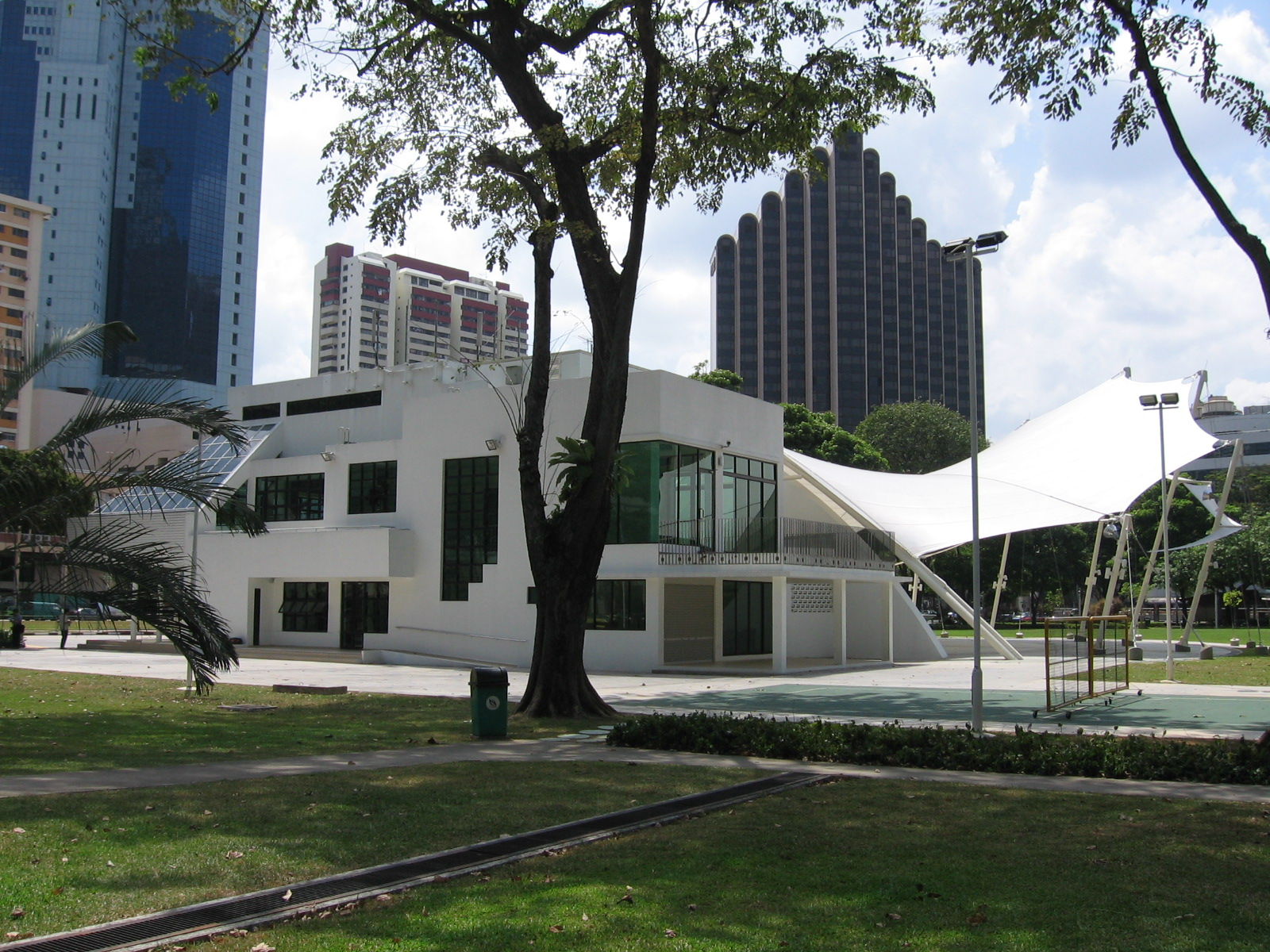
Telok Ayer Hong Lim Green Community Centre

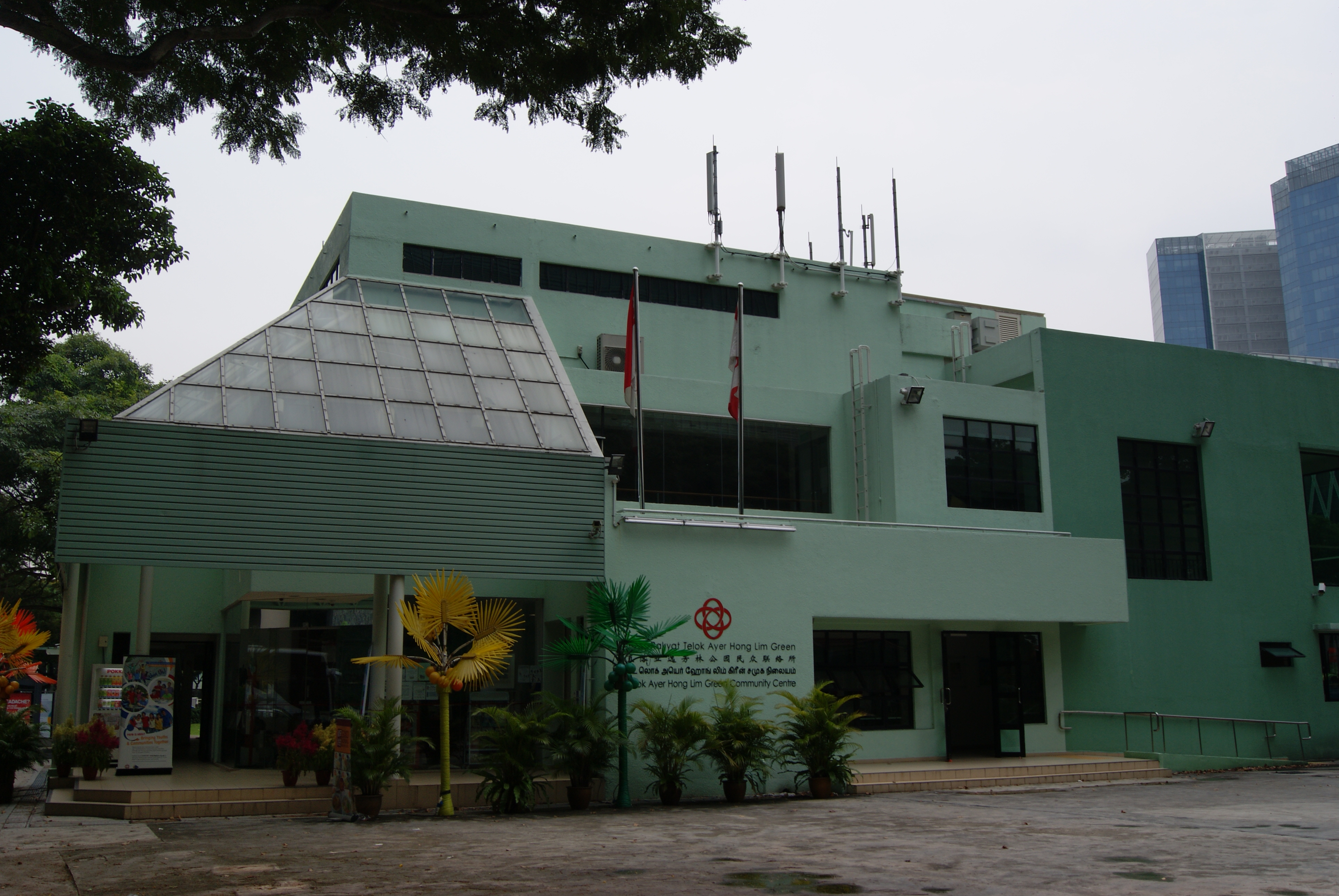

== Geography ==
The park was bounded by North Canal Road, South Bridge Road, Upper Pickering Street and New Bridge Road. Telok Ayer Hong Lim Green Community Centre and the Kreta Ayer Neighbourhood Police Post lie adjacent to the park. Adjacent to the park are the Telok Ayer Hong Lim Green Community Centre and the Kreta Ayer Neighbourhood Police Post.

== See also ==
- List of parks in Singapore
- National Parks Board
- Speakers' Corner, Singapore
