= Speakers' Corner, Singapore =

Free speech zone in Singapore

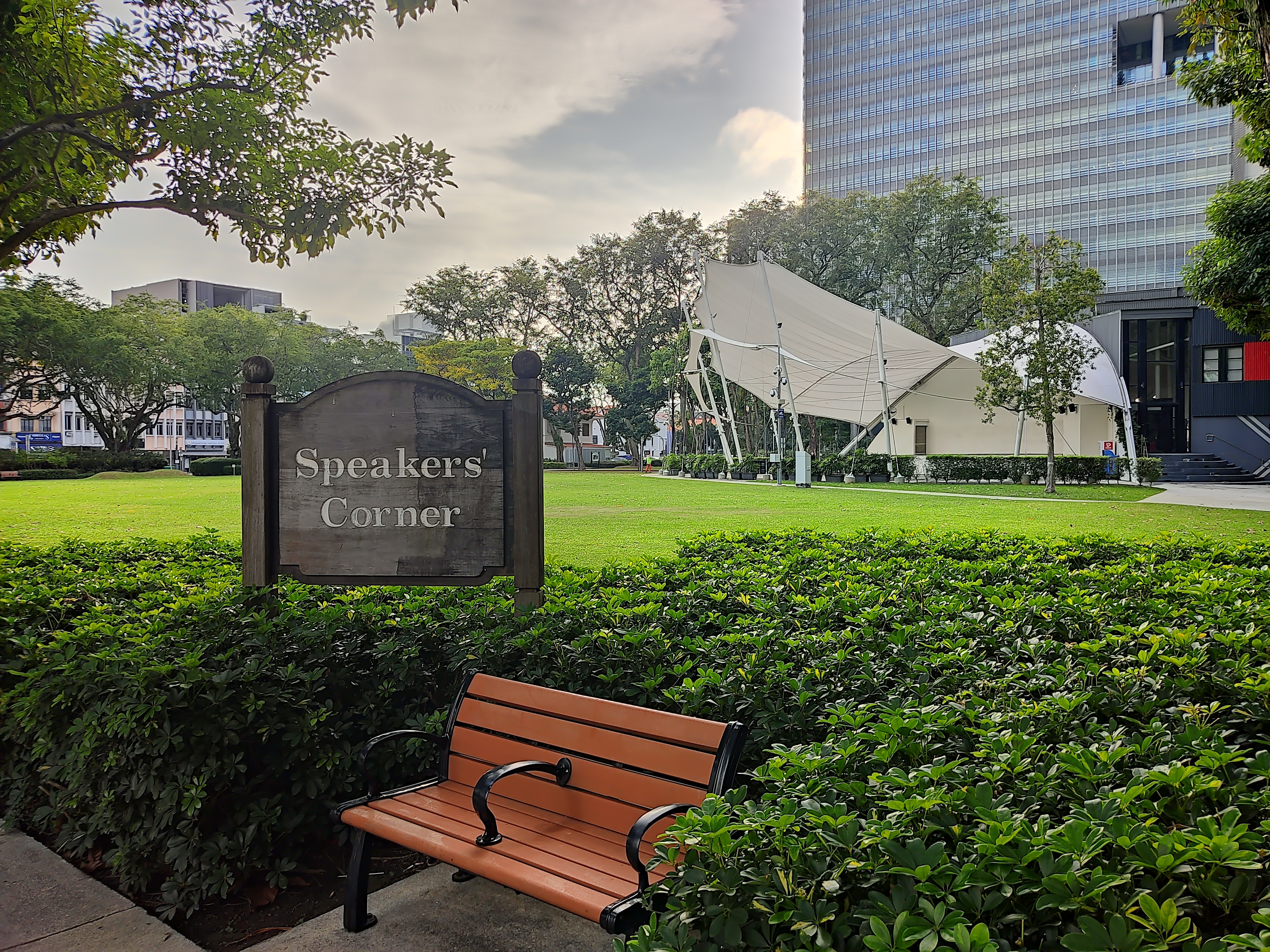
- Speakers' Corner at Hong Lim Park
- Interactive map of Speakers' Corner, Singapore
- Full name: Speakers' Corner
- Address: Upper Pickering Street, Hong Lim Park, Singapore
- Location: Hong Lim Park, Singapore
- Coordinates: 1°17′12″N 103°50′47″E
- Operator: National Parks Board
- Type: Free speech zone
- Surface: Lawn
- Record attendance: 25,000 (Pink Dot SG, 4 June 2016)
- Public transit: NE5 Clarke Quay

Construction
- Opened: 1 September 2000; 26 years ago

Website
- www.nparks.gov.sg/speakers-corner

The Speakers' Corner is an outdoor venue located within Hong Lim Park, Singapore, where people can demonstrate, hold exhibitions and performances, and speak freely on most topics. It was launched on 1 September 2000 as a "free speech area" where speaking events could be held without the need to apply for a licence under the Public Entertainments Act (Cap. 257, 1985 Rev. Ed.), now the Public Entertainments and Meetings Act (Cap. 257, 2001 Rev. Ed.) ("PEMA"). However, it was necessary for people to register their intention to speak at the venue with a police officer at the Kreta Ayer Neighbourhood Police Post any time within 30 days before the event, though there was no requirement for the police to be informed of the topic of the proposed speech. Other conditions imposed were that speeches had to take place between 7:00 a.m. and 7:00 p.m., and the use of sound amplification devices was prohibited. In 2002, exhibitions and performances were permitted to be held at Speakers' Corner. Conditions for the use of Speakers' Corner were further liberalized in 2008. Responsibility for registering people wishing to speak or stage an exhibition or performance was taken over by the Commissioner of Parks and Recreation, and online registration was introduced. It became possible to hold demonstrations provided they are organized by Singapore citizens and the participants are only citizens and permanent residents. Events can now be held around the clock, and self-powered amplification devices like loudhailers may be used between 9:00 a.m. and 10:30 p.m.

At present, Speakers' Corner is concurrently regulated by the Parks and Trees Regulations (Cap. 216, Rg. 1, 2006 Rev. Ed.), the Public Entertainments and Meetings (Speakers' Corner) (Exemption) (No. 2) Order 2011 (S 493/2011) (issued under the PEMA) and the Public Order (Unrestricted Area) (No. 2) Order 2011 (S 494/2011) (issued under the Public Order Act 2009 (No. 15 of 2009) ("POA")). The applicable conditions have remained essentially unchanged. Speakers and demonstration organizers must be Singapore citizens, while participants at demonstrations must be either citizens or permanent residents. Banners, films, flags, photographs, placards, posters, signs, writing or other visible representations or paraphernalia containing violent, lewd or obscene material must not be displayed or exhibited. Persons making speeches must use one of the four official languages of Singapore (English, Malay, Mandarin and Tamil) or related dialects, and organizers of demonstrations must be present throughout the event. Events must not deal with any matter that relates directly or indirectly to any religious belief or to religion generally, or which may cause feelings of enmity, hatred, ill-will or hostility between different racial or religious groups in Singapore. Events adhering to the regulations are not immune from other existing laws such as those relating to defamation and sedition.

Article 14 of the Constitution of Singapore guarantee freedom of speech and expression and freedom of assembly to Singapore citizens. However, the PEMA and POA, which require permits to be obtained before public meetings and assemblies can be held, were enacted pursuant to exceptions to these rights. Article 14 also provides that Parliament may by law restrict the right to free speech to protect, among other things, Singapore's security and public order, and to prevent incitement to any criminal offence. Under Article 14(2)(b), the right of assembly may also be limited for public order reasons. As Speakers' Corner was intended to increase avenues available for the exercise of free speech, the pieces of subsidiary legislation regulating the venue were issued to provide that public speaking and demonstrations there are not subject to the PEMA and POA if the conditions specified in the subsidiary legislation are complied with. Speakers' Corner has been criticized as a token gesture, though others have pointed to its use by civil society activists as evidence that it has widened the political space in Singapore.

== Background and establishment ==
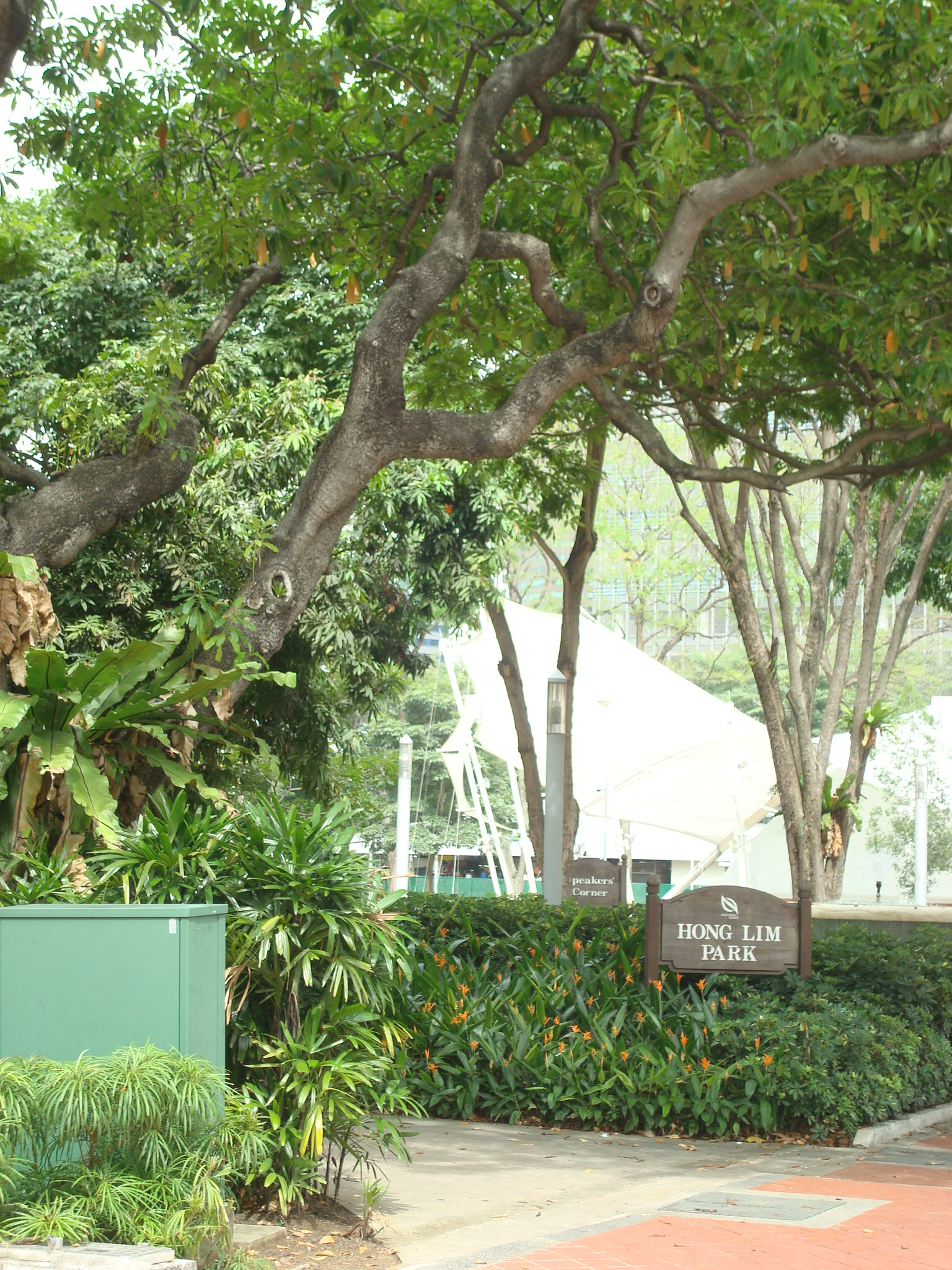
Hong Lim Park was chosen as the location for Speakers' Corner as, among other reasons, it was a historical venue for political speeches and rallies

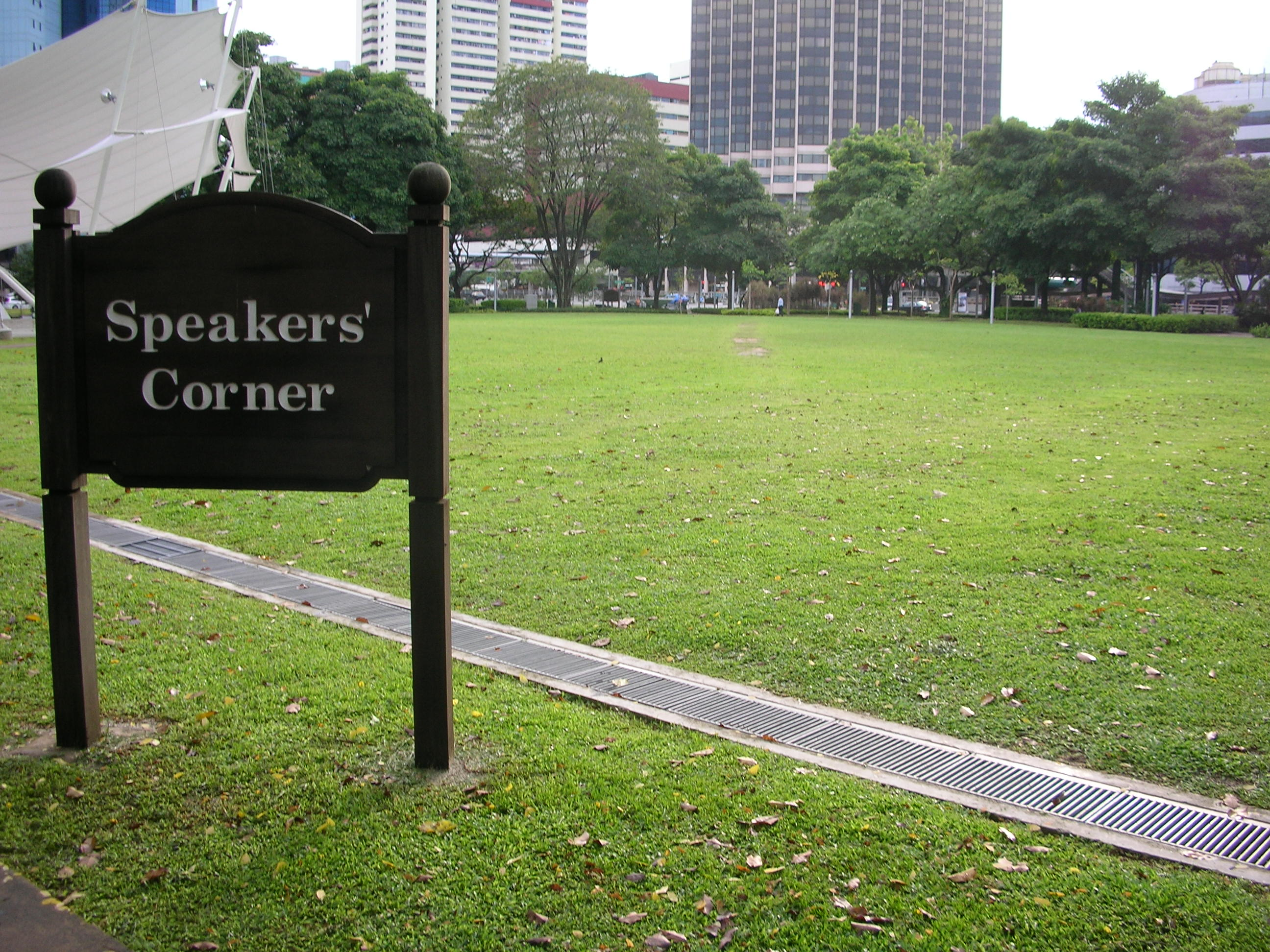
Speakers' Corner at Hong Lim Park in April 2006

Singapore's political model has been described as a representative democracy, and Singaporeans have constitutional rights to freedom of speech and assembly under Articles 14(1)(a) and (b) of the Constitution of the Republic of Singapore. The constitutional rights to free speech and assembly extend only to Singapore citizens. Hence, the Singapore Court of Appeal has held that non-citizens enjoy only common law free speech. Articles 14(1)(a) and (b) are then subject to Articles 14(2)(a) and (b) which allow Parliament to impose, by law, restrictions on the rights to freedom of speech and assembly. The grounds for restrictions are, for freedom of speech, Singapore's security, friendly relations with other states, public order, public morality, protecting parliamentary privilege, defamation, contempt of court and incitement to any criminal offence; and for freedom of assembly, public order only. These restrictions made it a lengthy and difficult process to obtain the licence required to address a public gathering.

In response to these free speech concerns, Speakers' Corner was created as local adaptation of the Speakers' Corner in Hyde Park, London. In a 1999 interview with New York Times columnist William Safire, Singapore's Prime Minister Goh Chok Tong attributed the idea to Senior Minister Lee Kuan Yew, but Goh felt that it was not yet the right time to set it up. The following year, the Government decided to go ahead despite its fear of potential public disorder, as the idea enjoyed widespread support from the public and civil society groups. During a parliamentary debate on the issue on 25 April 2000, opposition Member of Parliament (MP) J. B. Jeyaretnam asked the Wong Kan Seng, the Minister for Home Affairs. whether this was a "mere show" or whether the Government was serious about promoting free speech in Singapore. If the latter, he asked if the Minister would agree to an open debate with the Workers' Party of Singapore outside Parliament. In response, Wong said there was nothing to prevent Jeyaretnam from making a speech at Speakers' Corner, but that the public forum for a proper policy debate was in Parliament:

It is not just a question of symbolism. Of course, we have a place to show. It is symbolism in the sense that, yes, if you want a place, there is a place. But for free speech, I think we must not delude ourselves. He [Jeyaretnam] can do so on the Internet. He can do so with the press. He can do so in any place he wants, subject to the rules of the land. And he can do so right here. So, what is the worry about having free speech? There is free speech all the time. It is a question of whether he is prepared to have it or not. Do not run away from it. When we give him an answer, stay here to listen.

Speakers' Corner was launched on 1 September 2000 at Hong Lim Park, a historical venue for political speeches and rallies. The park's proximity to the Kreta Ayer Neighbourhood Police Post (NPP) also made it convenient for people to register to speak at the venue. In the first nine months, more than a thousand speeches were made.

== Regulations governing usage ==
=== Previous regulations ===
Speakers' Corner was established by the issuance of the Public Entertainments (Speakers' Corner) (Exemption) Order 2000, which exempted people wishing to speak in Hong Lim Park from the need to apply for a licence under the Public Entertainments Act. Speakers had to be Singapore citizens, as the Government was concerned that the venue should not be used by foreigners "to pursue their own agenda whether in respect of their own domestic issues, or those of other countries, including Singapore's". They also had to register their intention to speak with a police officer at the Kreta Ayer NPP any time within 30 days before the public speaking, although there was no need to inform the police of the topic of the proposed speech. However, speakers were not permitted to deal with any matter which related either directly or indirectly to any religious belief or to religion generally, or which might cause feelings of enmity, hatred, ill-will or hostility between different racial or religious groups in Singapore.

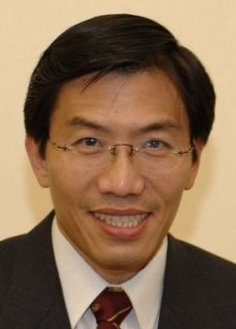
Chee Soon Juan

On 15 February 2002, while at Speakers' Corner, Singapore Democratic Party chief Chee Soon Juan attacked the Government's decision to suspend four Muslim girls for wearing the tudung (Islamic headscarf) to public schools. Contrary to police advice, he chose not to apply for a public entertainment licence, arguing he did not need one. Chee's speech sparked heated exchanges involving the Sikh practice of wearing turbans. In July, Chee was convicted and fined S$3,000 for speaking without the required licence. In his judgment, District Judge Kow Keng Siong emphasized the twin considerations of public order and national security in multi-racial and multi-religious Singapore, finding that Chee's speech had bred social unrest. Under the Constitution of Singapore, a person who has been fined at least $2,000 cannot stand for election to Parliament for five years. As a result of the incident, Chee was barred from contesting the 2006 general elections.

Other conditions imposed on a speech at Speakers' Corner were that it had to take place only between 7:00 a.m. and 7:00 p.m. on the date notified by the person to the police, had to be in one of Singapore's four official languages (English, Malay, Mandarin or Tamil) or any related dialect, and the use of sound amplification devices was prohibited. The latter restriction was justified on the grounds that it would reduce noise pollution and prevent one speaker from drowning out another one, and that it also applied to Speakers' Corner in London. In 2002, exhibitions and performances were also permitted to be held at Speakers' Corner. The conditions that organizers and participants had to adhere to were broadly similar to those applying to speeches. In addition, the organizer or an authorized agent had to be present at all times during the exhibition or performance, the event could not contain violent, lewd or obscene messages, no banners or placards could be carried by participants, and the event could not be an assembly or procession for which a permit was required under the Miscellaneous Offences (Public Order and Nuisance) (Assemblies and Processions) Rules.

=== Current regulations ===
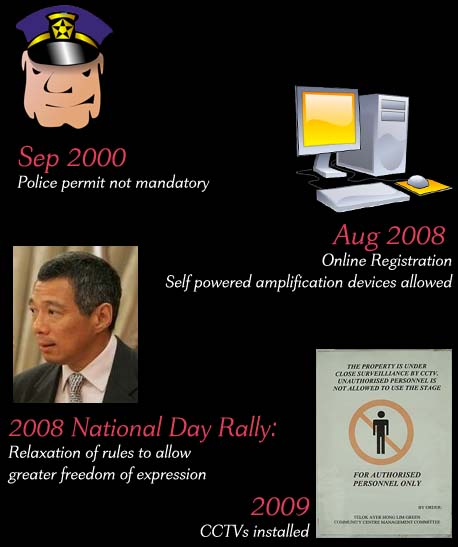
Developments at Speakers' Corner

With effect from 1 September 2008, under the Public Entertainments and Meetings (Speakers' Corner) (Exemption) Order 2008 ("2008 PEMA Order"), responsibility for registering people wishing to speak or stage an exhibition or performance at Speakers' Corner was taken over from the police by the Commissioner of Parks and Recreation by way of an amendment to the Parks and Trees Regulations. To provide greater convenience, the National Parks Board made it possible to for people to register online at its website. In addition, it became possible to hold demonstrations provided that they are organized by Singapore citizens and the participants are only citizens and permanent residents. As the time period restriction was lifted, events can now be held around the clock. In addition, rules on voice amplification were revised to allow the use of self-powered amplification devices like loudhailers from 9:00 a.m. to 10:30 p.m. This relaxation of the rules potentially allows for speakers' messages to be heard by larger audiences. A minor change was also introduced to the conditions for the use of Speakers' Corner – no banner, film, photograph, placard or poster containing any violent, lewd or obscene material may be displayed or exhibited whether before, during or after the event. In the first month after public demonstrations were permitted at Speakers' Corner, 11 out of the 31 applications received were indicated as being public protests. Hearers of Cries, a group concerned with the plight of abused maids, became the first group to hold a public outdoor demonstration at Speakers' Corner.

The Public Order Act, intended to regulate public assemblies and processions and to introduce new powers for the preservation of public order, came into force on 9 October 2009. On the same day, the Public Order (Unrestricted Area) Order 2009 ("2009 POA Order") made pursuant to the Act declared that Speakers' Corner was an unrestricted area in which assemblies and processions could be held without the need for a police permit. Thus, at present, Speakers' Corner is concurrently regulated by the Parks and Trees Regulations, and by exemption orders issued under the PEMA and POA. The conditions under which addresses, debates, demonstrations, discussions, lectures and talks (whether or not together with any exhibition, performance, play-reading or recital), must be held have remained essentially unchanged. Speakers and demonstration organizers must be Singapore citizens, while participants in demonstrations must be either citizens or permanent residents. Banners, films, flags, photographs, placards, posters, signs, writing or other visible representations or paraphernalia containing violent, lewd or obscene material must not be displayed or exhibited. Persons making speeches must use one of the four official languages of Singapore or related dialects, and organizers of demonstrations must be present throughout the event. In January 2008, the Complaints Choir, a vocal group participating in the M1 Singapore Fringe Festival 2008, was denied the chance to perform at Speakers' Corner and other outdoor venues unless the six foreigners in the group of 50 did not participate in the performance. As the choir did not wish to be split up in any way, it decided not to go ahead with the performance. Queried on the matter in Parliament, the Minister for Communication, Information and the Arts Dr. Lee Boon Yang stated that the Government did not think it "desirable or good precedent" for "foreigners [to come] here to organise and to lead Singaporeans to complain about our domestic issues".

Crucially, events held at Speakers' Corner must not deal with any matter that relates directly or indirectly to any religious belief or to religion generally, or which may cause feelings of enmity, hatred, ill-will or hostility between different racial or religious groups in Singapore. On 19 September 2008, Thamiselvan Karuppaya, an Indian real estate agent who wished to speak at Speakers' Corner about the use of Tamil on public signs, had to change his plans after being informed by the police that he required a permit as the topic of his speech was racially sensitive. A subsequent application for a permit was turned down. A contravention of the regulations renders speakers and organizers of demonstrations liable to fines of up to $10,000, or incarceration of up to six months. The penalty for displaying anything violent, lewd or obscene at a demonstration is a fine not exceeding $3,000 or, on a subsequent conviction, $5,000. Events which adhere to the regulations are also not immune from other existing laws such as those relating to defamation and sedition. In 2011, the regulations creating Speakers' Corner were suspended and then restored twice: first for the purpose of the campaigning period during the general election, and subsequently for the presidential election.

== Relation to the rights to free speech and assembly ==
James Gomez: Singaporeans lack a "culture of speaking"

In his 2008 National Day Rally speech, Prime Minister Lee Hsien Loong indicated that the purpose behind various government policies, including the creation of Speakers' Corner, was to "liberalise our society, to widen the space for expression and participation". Its reception was mixed, however, and there have been a wide range of views and perspectives on the impact of Speakers' Corner in increasing the space for free speech and the freedom to assemble. It has been called an "exercise in tokenism" for the purpose of preserving a literal "space" for engaging in free speech while also "cornering" it in that space. This is reflected in the relative lack of progress towards liberalization in other areas such as awards of high damages in libel lawsuits brought by politicians which has been said to have a chilling effect on political speech in Singapore. Former Workers' Party member James Gomez has also expressed concerns about the effectiveness of the Speakers' Corner as a site of vibrant political debate, citing the lack of a "culture of speaking" amongst Singaporeans. The ban on racially or religiously sensitive speech has been criticized as possibly curtailing free speech on genuine political matters and limiting the scope of constitutionally entrenched fundamental liberties.

Despite such criticisms, some social activist groups remain optimistic that Speakers' Corner represents a step towards political liberalization and the promise of a wider political space. Although Dr. Kenneth Paul Tan, Assistant Dean of the Lee Kuan Yew School of Public Policy, has noted that initial cynicism was inevitable as Speakers' Corner was a top-down initiative, he recognizes that civil society activists have since actively occupied and made use of Speakers' Corner to generate public interest in various social and political issues. This view is shared by Professor Bilveer Singh, a political science analyst at the National University of Singapore, who has pointed to large turnouts at events organized at Speakers' Corner as evidence that Singaporeans are "not fearful and not politically apathetic." The government has also shown itself to be sensitive to calls for greater liberalisation on the ground, with Prime Minister Lee Hsien Loong acknowledging incremental changes to the rules and regulations at Speakers' Corner to be necessary for "more citizens to engage in debate" and to "progressively open up our system even more".

== Developments ==
In 2008, Speakers' Corner was the scene for meetings held over several weeks by Tan Kin Lian, former chief executive of insurance company NTUC Income, to advise people of their legal recourse after structured products they had purchased became virtually valueless upon the collapse of Lehman Brothers. On 23 January 2009 during an event at Speakers' Corner, the National Solidarity Party gave its views on the national budget one day after it was announced, criticizing the Government for not doing enough to assist unemployed breadwinners during the recession. The Party's secretary-general, Ken Sunn, said the event was to let Singaporeans "participate, speak and hear various views and opinions on the Singapore Government's 2009 Budget statement, and discuss ways to improve our Singapore Economy". The first public rally by the lesbian, gay, bisexual and transgender (LGBT) community in Singapore, called Pink Dot, was held on 16 May 2009. Estimates of the number of people who attended ranged from 1,000 to 2,500 people. On 31 May 2009, more than a hundred people attended a demonstration at Speakers' Corner organized by human rights advocacy group Maruah to call for Myanmar's military junta to release Aung San Suu Kyi. Participants from Myanmar were requested to remain outside a cordoned-off area since only Singaporeans and permanent residents may attend demonstrations at Speakers' Corner.

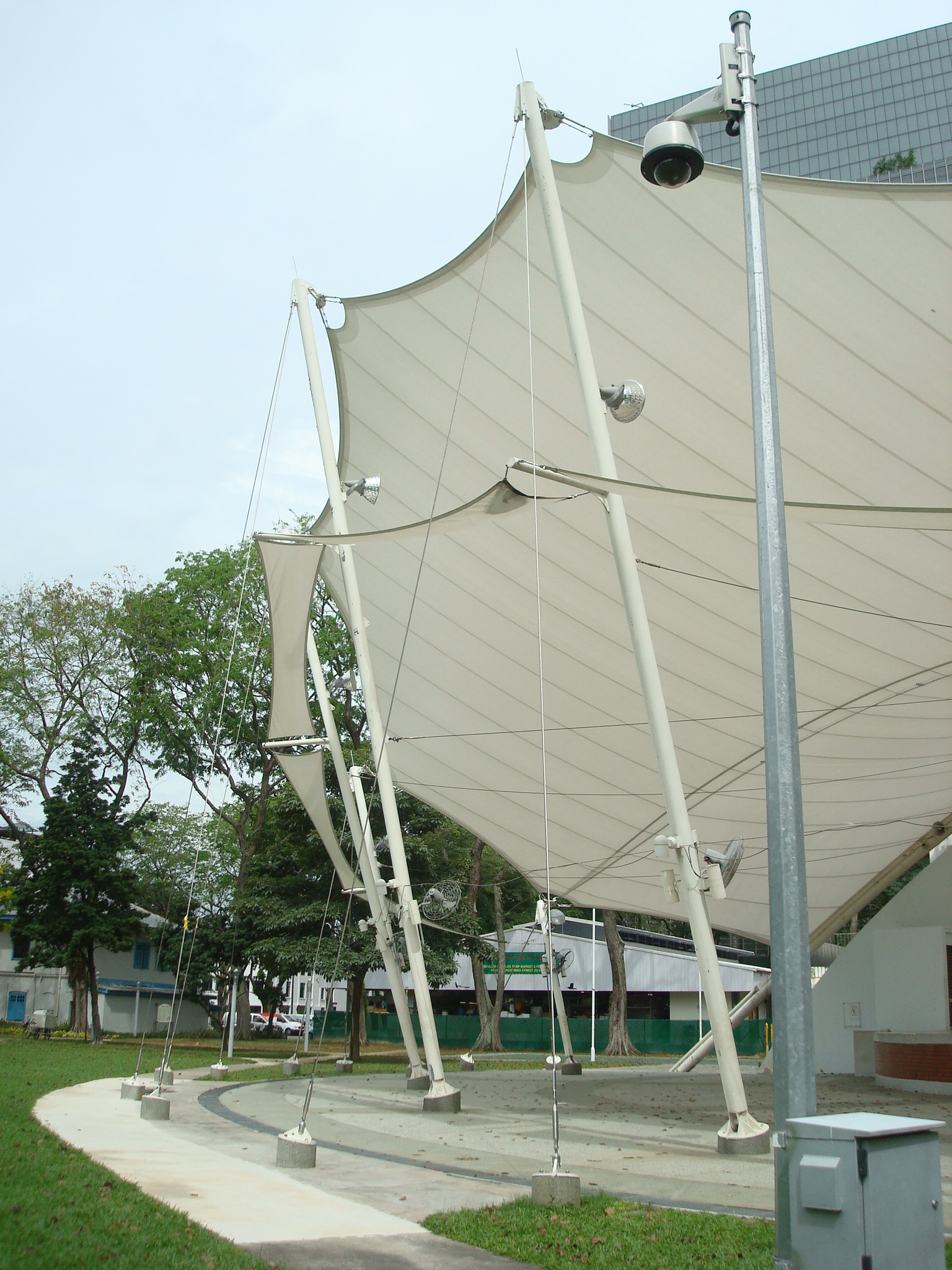
A security camera on the grounds of the Telok Ayer Hong Lim Green Community Centre next to Speakers' Corner. The centre does not form part of Speakers' Corner.

In July 2009, the police installed closed circuit television (CCTV) cameras for "safety and security". The police said that the cameras complemented the presence of their officers on the ground and did not record audio inputs. The move drew some negative reactions from the public. Former Nominated Member of Parliament Siew Kum Hong felt that the installation of CCTV cameras was "pretty ridiculous", and wondered if the move might feed the perception in some quarters that Singapore is a police state, since Speakers' Corner is "the one place in Singapore" where people can demonstrate. Nevertheless, the cameras have not affected various events from being held. With effect from 1 December 2009, the size of Speakers' Corner was reduced so that it only occupies the half of Hong Lim Park nearer New Bridge Road. From 1 March 2012, Speakers' Corner was expanded to include an area behind Kreta Ayer NPP, near the junction of North Canal Road and South Bridge Road.

A commemorative birthday memorial was organized for J.B. Jeyaretnam, the late leader of the opposition Reform Party, at Speakers' Corner on 5 January 2010. At the event, several opposition politicians shared with the public their experiences with Jeyaretnam. In September 2010, Today newspaper reported that statistics from the National Parks Board indicated that the number of groups registering to stage events at Speakers' Corner had fallen from 39 between September 2008 and August 2009, to nine between September 2009 and August 2010. The number of individuals registering dropped from 102 to 57 during the same periods. Senior Minister Goh Chok Tong, who was Prime Minister when Speakers' Corner was set up, expressed the view that its use had declined because there were now other avenues for people to express themselves such as the Internet (including the Government's online feedback portal Reach), newspapers, and radio and television channels. Also, people might feel that the venue is not always the best place "to meaningfully and constructively press their views on issues". He saw Speakers' Corner as "playing the same role as envisaged – mostly dormant but good to have".

On 30 November 2013, The Purple Parade, the first public rally by the special needs community in Singapore, was held and attracted 4,000 participants. The COVID-19 pandemic had caused applications to host events at the Speakers' Corner being suspended in April 2020. As such, the Pink Dot rally in 2020 was a virtual event rather than a physical rally at Speakers' Corner. Speakers' Corner was reopened on 25 March 2022. When the Gaza war erupted as part of the wider Israeli–Palestinian conflict, the Singapore Police Force and NParks said in a joint statement in October 2023 that "The Police will not grant any permit for assemblies that advocate political causes of other countries or foreign entities, or may have the potential to stir emotions and lead to public order incidents", and that "peace and harmony between different races and religions in Singapore should not be taken for granted, and we must not let events happening externally affect the internal situation within Singapore".
