= Tras =

Tras may refer to:

- Tras (state constituency), in Malaysia
- tras, a Spanish preposition
- Tras Honan (born 1930), Irish politician
- Xavier Tras, a fictional name used in cricket scoring

== See also ==
- Tras Street, a street in Singapore
- Trass
