= Ngee Heng Kongsi of Johor =

Teochew secret society

Ngee Heng Kongsi of Johor (Chinese: 義興公司; pinyin: Yì Xīng Gōngsī; Teochew Pêh-uē-jī: Ngĭ Heng Kong-si; 1844–1916) was a Teochew secret society that founded the earliest Chinese settlement in Johor. However, it did not have a clandestine image and has instead been accorded a respectable place in the history of the Johor Chinese. The term kongsi generally refers to any firm or partnership, and has also been used to refer to any group or society in a very broad sense. Ngee Heng is the Teochew name for the Ghi Hin or Ghee Hin, its name in Hokkien. The name identifies it as the Teochew offshoot of the Tiandihui secret society.

== Overview ==
Starting as a group of political dissidents under Tan Kee Soon, the Ngee Heng Kongsi gradually transformed itself into an organisation of towkays and revenue farmers under its second leader Major China Tan Hiok Nee. Sultan Abu Bakar recognised the Ngee Heng Kongsi as a legitimate organisation and made it responsible for law and order among the Chinese in Johor, with the result that it dominated Chinese society as well as the pepper and gambier cultivation in the state. The Maharaja had seen how, in various parts of Malaya, Chinese led by one secret society had clashed in bloody feuds with other Chinese led by rival secret societies. In 1854, bad blood between the Ghi Hin and Ghi Hok had provoked ferocious fighting between the Hokkiens and the Teochews in Singapore. The riots lasted 10 days and some 400 Chinese were killed and many injured, with the conflict spreading to Johor. The Maharaja was anxious to prevent this kind of destructive conflict and introduced a number of controls. The Ngee Heng was required to open its membership to all Chinese. All kangchus, Kapitan Chinas and cultivators were required to be members and the Ngee Heng was held responsible for the behaviour of its members individually and collectively. In this way, the Maharaja brought all Chinese under his patronage and the Ngee Heng Kongsi exercised much influence over the Chinese and their affairs.

== The influence of the Ngee Heng ==
The influence of the Ngee Heng which stretched from Riau to Singapore and Johor, was based on the large numbers of Chinese engaged in the cultivation of pepper and gambier who formed the pepper and gambier society. The Ngee Heng Kongsi of Singapore, from which the Ngee Heng Kongsi of Johor was derived, was an economic entity which first co-existed with colonial authority but was subsequently marginalised, criminalised and eventually suppressed as it got involved in armed robberies and crimes of violence.

== Leader of Ngee Heng Kongsi Johor ==
- 1. Tan Kee Soon
- 2. Tan Hiok Nee
- 3. Lim Ah Siang
- 4. Lin Jin He

== History ==
The history of the Ngee Heng Kongsi in Johor is an integral part of the history of the Chinese in Johor which in turn is an integral part of the economic history of Johor. It is well known that when Temenggong Daeng Ibrahim wished to develop Johor, he had few resources at his disposal. Johor then consisted of vast tracts of dense jungle and rivers were the only means of access into the interior. When he opened Johor to the Chinese, the Ngee Heng gained a dominant position among the Chinese there. The Ngee Heng did not follow the Chinese to Johor but led them there. The drift towards Johor was a natural consequence of its proximity to Singapore but in the 1840s, a clearer move northwards can be seen as a result of various factors, chief of which was the growing shortage of land and when the Singapore authorities introduced a system of land registration, the cultivators objected to paying the quit rent. The upshot was that in 1846, Tan Tek Hye, calling himself "Keeper of the Quinquangular Seal", published a letter in the Singapore Free Press informing the public that the Ngee Heng had commanded 4,000 members of its brotherhood to relocate in Johor in protest. This forms the first record of a substantial migration of Chinese to Johor.

== Ngee Heng Kongsi during Sultan Abu Bakar time ==
Only the Ngee Heng had appeared in Johor because Sultan Abu Bakar only permitted one secret society to function in Johor. To Sultan Abu Bakar, a brotherhood like the Ngee Heng Kongsi, with its combination of muscle and moral authority, was the best barrier against infiltration by unwanted Chinese and the best means of ensuring that the scattered Chinese population remained loyal to him. Tan Kee Soon therefore did not live to see the Ngee Heng officially recognised for he died about 1864 although it is possible that he could have had some kind of tacit understanding with the Sultan or even with the Temenggong. After his death, the character of the Ngee Heng changed under the new leadership of Tan Hiok Nee. From a quasi-military revolutionary brotherhood based in the rural settlement of Kangkar Tebrau, it became an organisation of kapitans and kangchus and revenue farmers based in the state capital of Johor Bahru. The expansion of pepper and gambier planting continued steadily as the cultivators pushed deeper and deeper into the jungle and plantations were established on more and more rivers. Since the Sultan required all Chinese to be members of the Ngee Heng, its influence spread all through the state wherever such settlements were formed, which at the same time, became a means by which the Sultan's authority was carried to remote areas in Johor. In this way, the Sultan brought all Chinese under one system of political and economic control and extended his authority over his state.

== Secret societies during British Malaya ==
Secret societies in Malaya were initially not illegal and the disturbances they created were directed at each rather than against the government. In the beginning, they promoted co-operation between members, controlled investment and labour recruitment, maintained law and order and acted as intermediaries between Malay and British authorities thorough the Kapitan China system. But as their activities against law and order increased, the scale of their operations drew the concern of the British authorities. Officials in the Straits Settlements had long pressed for some measures to be taken for controlling the secret societies. In 1869, they succeeded in enacting the Dangerous Society Ordinance but it was limited in its effectiveness as it only gave the government powers to register but not to suppress the secret societies. However, it was only in 1890 that suppression came at last with the enactment of the Societies Ordinance after which similar legislation was adopted in the Malay states, except in Johor which had it delayed until 1916. When Governor Sir Cecil Clementi Smith asked Sultan Abu Bakar to follow suit, his reply in 1891 was a defence of the Ngee Heng and of his policy.

Even though the Ngee Heng Kongsi first took root in Tebrau, it took the lead in providing for the welfare of the community; they built schools and temples, maintained cemeteries, provided for the sick and indigent and so on, and donated generously for these purposes. The first building the Ngee Heng constructed or helped to construct, was a temple to provide for the religious needs of the immigrants. This is the Johor Bahru Old Chinese temple built in the 1860s just as Johor Bahru was being opened up. They also established a cemetery on the land around their lodge and which is popularly referred to as Kongsi Shan (Kongsi Cemetery). In 1913, its leaders joined with other Chinese to found the Foon Yew School with Wong Ah Fook as manager and Lim Ah Siang as his deputy.

== Wound up with the enactment of the Societies Ordinance ==
Lim Ah Siang died soon after executing the bond and it was his successor, Lin Jin He, who had to manage the disposal of Ngee Heng's assets. A sum of $5,000 was spent on building a tomb on a site not far from their lodge into which the leaders of Ngee Heng deposited all their ritual and sacred objects including their ancestral tablets. The tombstone carries only two characters, “Ming Mu”, meaning Ming Tomb. The "ancestors" and the words on the tombstone are a throw-back to the Tiandihui's founding myth, to the monks who died in the burning of the Shaolin Temple and to the survivors' aim of restoring the Ming. The remaining balance of $30,000 was donated to Foon Yew School to establish an endowment fund, a substantial sum in those days and a windfall for the struggling school. A condition of the donation was that the school would perform the annual rituals of ancestor worship at the Ming Tomb during the two festivals of remembrance which are Qingming and Chongyang. The Ngee Heng Kongsi lives on in the public awareness through the public spaces in Johor Bahru which carry its name or the names of its leaders. They are: Jalan Ngee Heng Kampung Ngee Heng Ngee Heng School Jalan Tan Hiok Nee Jalan Ah Siang Kampong Ah Siang Kongsi Shan With the exception of the last which is an unofficial name used only among the Chinese, the other names can be seen in contemporary maps of the city. When suppression came, the Ngee Heng gave in quietly, "without trouble" as Campbell reported with satisfaction. The Ngee Heng leaders had foreseen that a brotherhood like the Ngee Heng was no longer an appropriate organisation to represent the interests of the Chinese and buried the connections to a past that were no longer relevant. It is also questionable whether as merchants, they were really comfortable with the brotherhood's martial spirit, secret rituals and blood oaths. They preferred to replace it with the Chinese Association of Johor Bahru which is a modern style organisation with elected office-bearers governed by an approved constitution.

== See also ==
- Ghee Hin Kongsi
