= Segget River =

River of Johor, Malaysia

Coordinates: 1°27′32.3″N 103°45′53.0″E

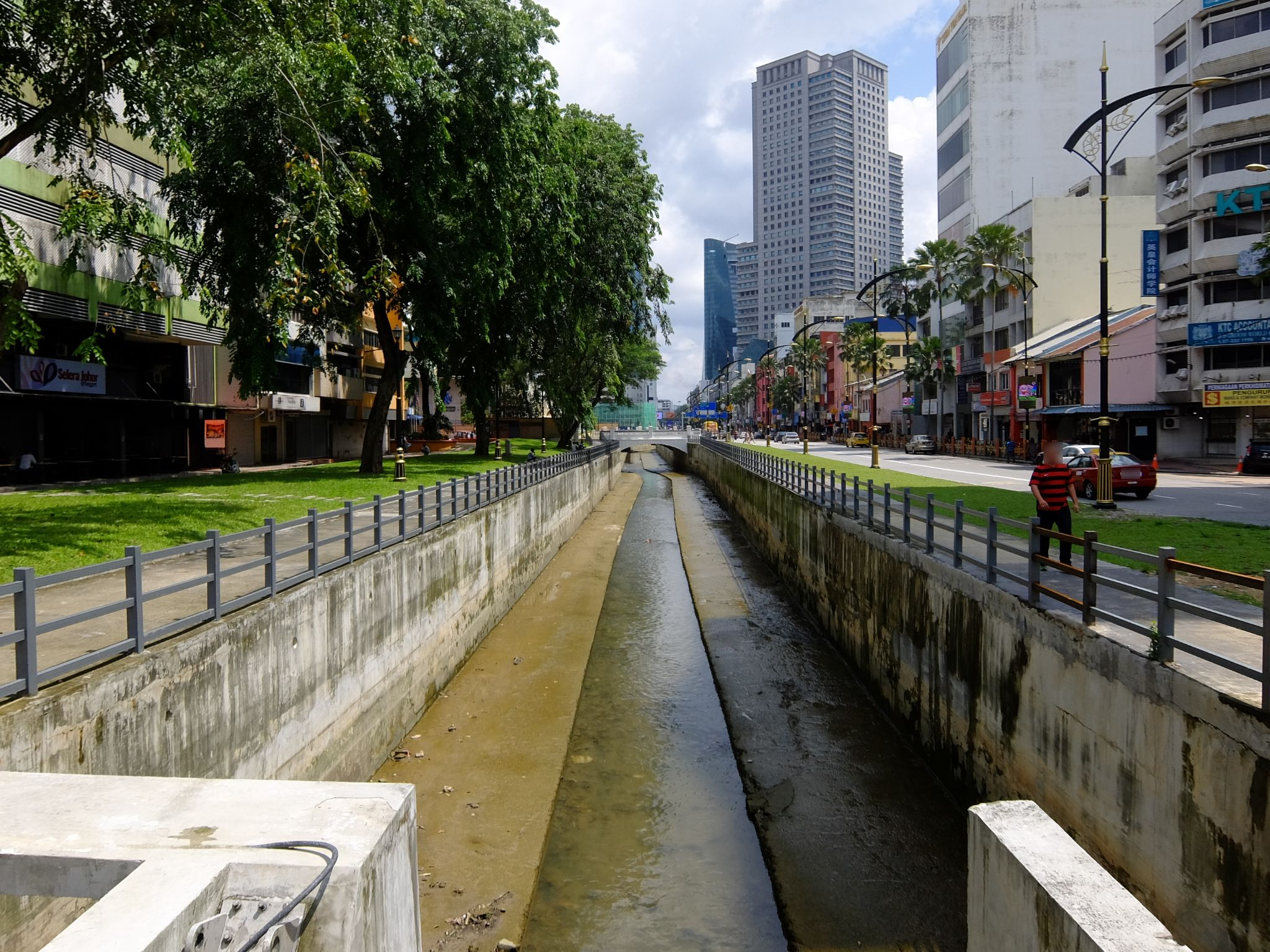
- Native name: Sungai Segget (Malay)

Location
- Country: Malaysia

Physical characteristics
- Source
  - location: Malaysia
- Mouth: Tebrau Strait
  - location: Malaysia
- Length: 4.28 km (2.66 mi)

Segget River (Malay: Sungai Segget, Chinese: 纱玉河) is a river in Johor, Malaysia. The length of the river is about 4,280 meters. It starts from the current Johor Bahru Chinese Cemetery, through the downtown of Johor Bahru city, and ends at Straits of Johor.

The Segget River flows through the east bank and the west bank of the river. There is a small shaped triangle island called Segget Island. There is a wet market on the island. The West Bank of Segget River was mostly settled by Teochew. The road by the river is called Jalan Trus, most of the business around that area is owned by Teochew Chinese, and Johor Bahru Old Chinese temple is also located here. The roads adjoining with Jalan Trus are Jalan Tan Hiok Nee, Jalan Ibrahim and Jalan Dhoby.

The East bank of the Segget river was mostly settled by Cantonese immigrants. The Stulang Steam Sawmill owned by Lim Ah Siang located near to Jalan Meldrum, and Jalan Sawmill in the downtown of Johor Bahru is named after this sawmill. Wong Ah Fook owned big pieces of land on the east bank of the river, and Jalan Wong Ah Fook is named after him. Jalan Siu Chin, Jalan Siu Koon and Jalan Siu Nam are the roads named after Wong Ah Fook's son. Johor Bahru Sentral railway station is also located on the east bank of the river, the Jalan Stesen is named after the railway station.

== See also ==
- Geography of Malaysia
