= Peck Seah Street =

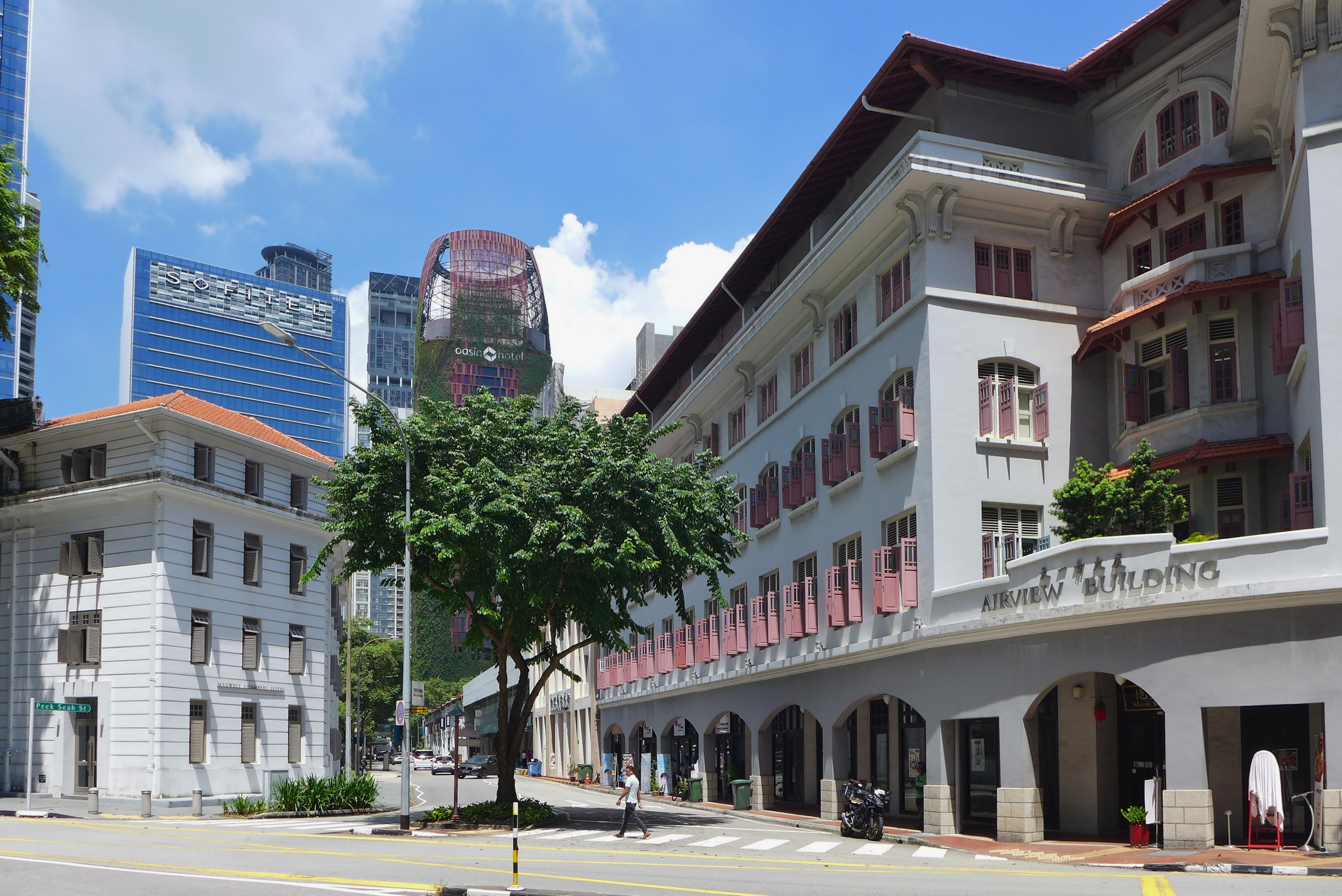
- Peck Seah Street in 2024
- Interactive map of Peck Seah Street
- Native name: 柏城街 (Chinese)
- Part of: Gopeng Street and Maxwell Road
- Length: 403.95 m (1,325.3 ft)
- Coordinates: 1°16′32.0″N 103°50′40.3″E
- South end: Gopeng Street
- North end: Maxwell Road

Peck Seah Street (Chinese: 柏城街; pinyin: Bǎi chéng jiē) is a street located in Tanjong Pagar on the boundary between Outram Planning Area and the Downtown Core in Singapore. The road connects Gopeng Street and Tras Street to Maxwell Road, and is intersected by Wallich Street.

== Etymology and history ==
Peck Seah Street was named after Seah Peck Seah (Chinese: 佘柏城; pinyin: Shé Bǎi Chéng), the youngest son of Seah Eu Chin and brother of Seah Liang Seah (Chinese: 佘连城; pinyin: Shé Lián Chéng). He was the proprietor of Ho Hong Steamship Company and a partner of the Chin Huat Hin Oil Trading Company. He also served as a Justice of Peace. The Seah family was prominent in the Ngee Ann Kongsi and controlled it for many years.

== Seng Wong Beo Temple ==
There is a prominent City God temple known as Seng Wong Beo Temple or Du Cheng Huang Miao (都城隍庙) which is located along Peck Seah Street, the temple was founded in 1905. The City God worshipped in Seng Wong Beo Temple is a Provincial City God or Wei Ling Gong (威灵公), which is the most senior ranking City God that can be found in Singapore. Reverend Swee Oi, the founder of Seng Wong Beo Temple was formerly Qing dynasty's tributary scholar, Khoo Sook Yuen and him had strong interest in literary and poetry appreciation and they were good friends. Khoo was able to financially support Swee in the establishment of Seng Wong Beo Temple. After the Seng Wong Beo Temple was built, Khoo and Swee were known to have had lively conversations about poetry and art in the backyard.
