= Zain Fancy =

Singaporean business executive

- Born: Karachi, Pakistan
- Occupations: Real estate investor, business executive
- Employer: Clifton Partners
- Known for: Founder and managing director of Clifton Partners

Zain Fancy is a Singaporean real estate investor and business executive. He is the founder and managing director of Clifton Partners, a Singapore-based real estate investment firm.

== Career ==
Fancy was born in Karachi, Pakistan, and later became a Singapore citizen. He attended Karachi Grammar School before attending Phillips Academy Andover, where he graduated in 1992. He then attended Georgetown University in Washington, D.C., where he graduated in 1996.

Zain began his career in investment banking in New York with Morgan Stanley before relocating to Asia. He later joined Morgan Stanley Real Estate Investing, where he became head of the firm's Asian real estate investing business. In 2008, he moved to Och-Ziff Capital Management Group as a managing director focused on Asian real estate investments.

In 2010, Fancy left Och-Ziff and founded Clifton Partners in Singapore. The firm initially focused on real estate investments in Asia and later became active in Singapore's conservation shophouse market.

According to The Business Times, Clifton Partners and its affiliates owned 14 shophouses in Singapore's central business district by 2017, with a combined value of approximately S$250 million. In 2018, an entity associated with Clifton Partners acquired three adjoining conservation shophouses on Tras Street for S$21.2 million.

In 2024, an affiliate of Clifton Partners sold three properties to Zhang Ying, the wife of Jack Ma. In 2024, Clifton Partners also acquired three large shophouses in Singapore’s Bugis Street for S$72 million.

In 2025, Clifton Partners acquired a portfolio of assets from billionaire Ricardo Portabella. That same year, Clifton Partners closed its debut investment fund focused on Singapore commercial assets.

In 2011, Fancy set up a Singapore-based real estate investment firm focused on small and medium-sized properties.

== Legal dispute ==
In 2011, Fancy successfully sued his former lawyers over a failed property transaction involving a residential property in Singapore. The case was reported by Bloomberg News, which noted that the court awarded him damages of approximately S$1.8 million.

== Community involvement ==
Fancy, an Ismaili, has been involved with the Ismaili Muslim community in Singapore. In 2025, he was serving as president of the Ismaili Council for Southeast Asia.
