= Lim Ah Siang =

Kapitan China Lim Ah Siang SMJ
- 林亞相

Leader of the Ngee Heng Kongsi of Johor
- In office 1885–1916
- Preceded by: Tan Hiok Nee
- Succeeded by: Lin Jin He

Personal details
- Born: 1853 Chaoyang County, Guangdong Province, Qing Empire
- Died: 19 February 1917 (aged 63–64) Singapore, Straits Settlements
- Children: Lim Choon Seng

Kapitan Cina Lim Ah Siang (Chinese: 林亞相; pinyin: Lín Yàxiāng; Pe̍h-ōe-jī: Lîm A-siang; 1853 – 19 February 1917), a timber merchant and steam saw miller, the founder of "Chop Sin Moh" Johor Bahru, was the third leader of the Ngee Heng Kongsi of Johor, a legitimised secret society based in Johor Bahru. He was appointed to the position not because he was the most prominent Chinese in Johor at the time but rather, because he was not.

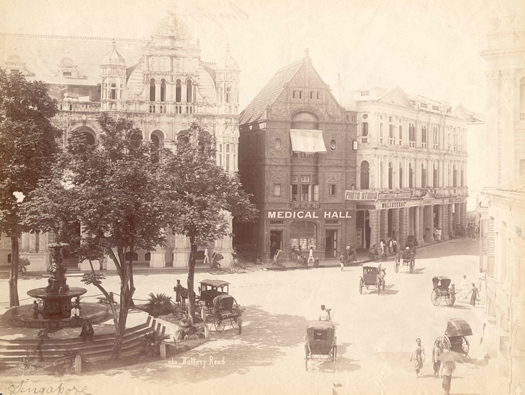
Lim Ah Siang once Stulang Steam Saw Mills' office in Singapore at Gresham House, Singapore (right side of the Medical Hall) circa 1902

== Early life ==
Born in China Chaoyang, he came to Singapore illegally by boat.

He assumed the leadership of the Ngee Heng Kongsi of Johor around 1885, after Tan Hiok Nee stepped down and retire to Singapore. But Lim Ah Siang was still only referred as Second Brother, the second most senior-ranking member in the secret society hierarchy, as Tan Hiok Nee continued to be a towering presence in nearby Singapore.

Lim Ah Siang was unlike Tan Kee Soon and Tan Hiok Nee who had a personal relationship with the Sultan of Johor, he was described as only being a friend of the Menteri Besar of Johor Dato' Jaafar Bin Muhammad. With no new Kapitan appointed after Kapitan Tan Cheng Hung dropped out of sight after selling off his concessions, and Kapitan Seah Tee Heng having died in 1884, the latter's son, Seah Ling Chai, had taken over his father's kangchu concessions, pepper and gambier business, and revenue farms. In addition, he held shares to eight rivers in his own right and was the manager of the Kongkek (Pepper and Gambier Society of Singapore). Seah was therefore the most prominent towkay in Johor, but the Ngee Heng passed him over for an unknown young man, mostly probably because Tan Hiok Nee was still running the Kongsi from Singapore and only required an assistant, not a business rival, to be in charge.

== Wealth ==
In 1892, Lim Ah Siang was granted a 99-year lease from Sultan Abu Bakar for land in Stulang. The grant permitted him to set up a revenue farm on the eastern outskirts of the city. Although the concession was granted in 1892, it came into effect only in 1902 for reasons unknown. Lim built a road across the centre of his concession and named it Jalan Ah Siang, with his gambling farm built on stilts in the seafront facing what is now the New Hong Kong Restaurant. His concession was named Kampung Ah Siang. In 1896, Lim obtained timber concessions for east Johor and Endau. By then, he was also a revenue farmer, holding kangchu concessions for four rivers and had also invested in a number of businesses in Johor Baru, including a pawnshop. A road in Kota Tinggi is named after him.

As a timber merchant in Singapore and Johor, he appointed his son Lim Choon Seng, Tan Geok Soon and J.M Cameron as the managers of his timber business in Singapore and Johor around August 1902. He owned Stulang Steam Saw Mill in Stulang, Johor Bahru. He opened a branch of Chop Sin Moh at 181 Beach Road, Singapore in 1901. Then he opened a Stulang Steam Saw Mill office in Singapore at 7, Gresham House, Battery Road, Singapore around 1903 with J.M. Cameron appointed as the manager.

He owned Sin Teong Hin Kongsi at Indau, Sin Bun Hin Kongsi and Sin Giap Hin Kongsi at Kota Tinggi also, which were managed by both Lim Choon Seng and Tan Geok Soon.

In 1902, Lim Ah Siang bought Bin Chan House from Boey Chuan Poh (Chinese: 梅泉寶; pinyin: Méi Quánbǎo; Jyutping: Mui4 Cyun4 Bou2; Pe̍h-ōe-jī: Mûi Chôaⁿ-pó) with $10,800, and he sold this house to revolutionist Teo Eng Hock (Chinese: 張永福; pinyin: Zhāng Yǒngfú; Jyutping: Zoeng1 Wing5 Fuk1; Pe̍h-ōe-jī: Tiuⁿ Éng-hok) in 1905.

== Honour ==
- Johor
  - Companion of the Order of the Crown of Johor (Seri Mahkota Johor - SMJ)

== Death ==
In 1916, the Ngee Heng Kongsi was wound up with the enactment of the Societies Ordinance. Lim Ah Siang's final duty for the Ngee Heng was to sign a $30,000 bond for the settlement of Ngee Heng's liabilities and the disposal of its properties as part of winding up the society. He died soon after executing the bond and his successor, Lin Jin He, was assigned the task of disposing of Ngee Heng's assets.

On 19 February 1917, Lim Ah Siang died in his residence in Singapore: No 89, Kampong Java Road; his body was sent back to Johor Bahru. The Johor Military Force (Timbalan Setia Negeri) received him and the Johor flag was flown half-mast that day with a half-day holiday. Lim Ah Siang's tomb still stands on a hill near Jalan Ah Siang facing Singapore up to this day.
