= Chingay parade =

Annual street parade in Indonesia, Malaysia and Singapore

The Chingay Parade is a street-parade tradition practised in Malaysia and Singapore, with roots in Chinese religious processions. In Malaysia, Chingay is associated especially with Penang and Johor, and includes performances in which participants balance large flags. Malaysia declared Chingay a National Cultural Heritage in 2012.

The modern Singapore Chingay Parade began in 1973, after the government banned firecrackers the previous year. Originally a largely Chinese event, it became multicultural from 1977 with the participation of Malay and Indian groups, and later included performers from overseas. The parade subsequently developed into a large annual event featuring floats, acrobatics, dance and other performances.

In March 2025, Malaysia and Singapore jointly submitted Chingay for inscription on UNESCO's Representative List of the Intangible Cultural Heritage of Humanity, with a decision expected by the end of 2026 at the earliest.

== Origin ==
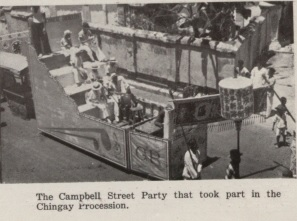
The Campbell Street Party that took part in the Chingay procession, Penang, 1937.

Chingay procession was held in celebration with the birthdays of the Chinese deities or the procession of the Goddess of Mercy (Guanyin). It was held to worship and enjoy with the deity. During the earliest procession in more than 100 years ago, the earliest English newspapers Echo in Malaysia adopted the word Chingay Procession for this special event.

Chingay originated from China, and the Penang Chinese first performed Chingay during deity processions. It is a street art where the performer balances a giant flag that ranges from 25 to 32 feet (7.6 to 9.8 m) in height and about 60 pounds (27 kg) in weight.

Today, in Malaysia and Singapore, Chingay is performed not only by the Chinese but also by Malays and Indians. It has become a multiracial performance. Its popularity in Penang has made it a cultural landmark and an important tourist attraction.

== Chingay in Malaysia ==
Chingay Parade has been declared a National Cultural Heritage in 2012.

=== Penang ===
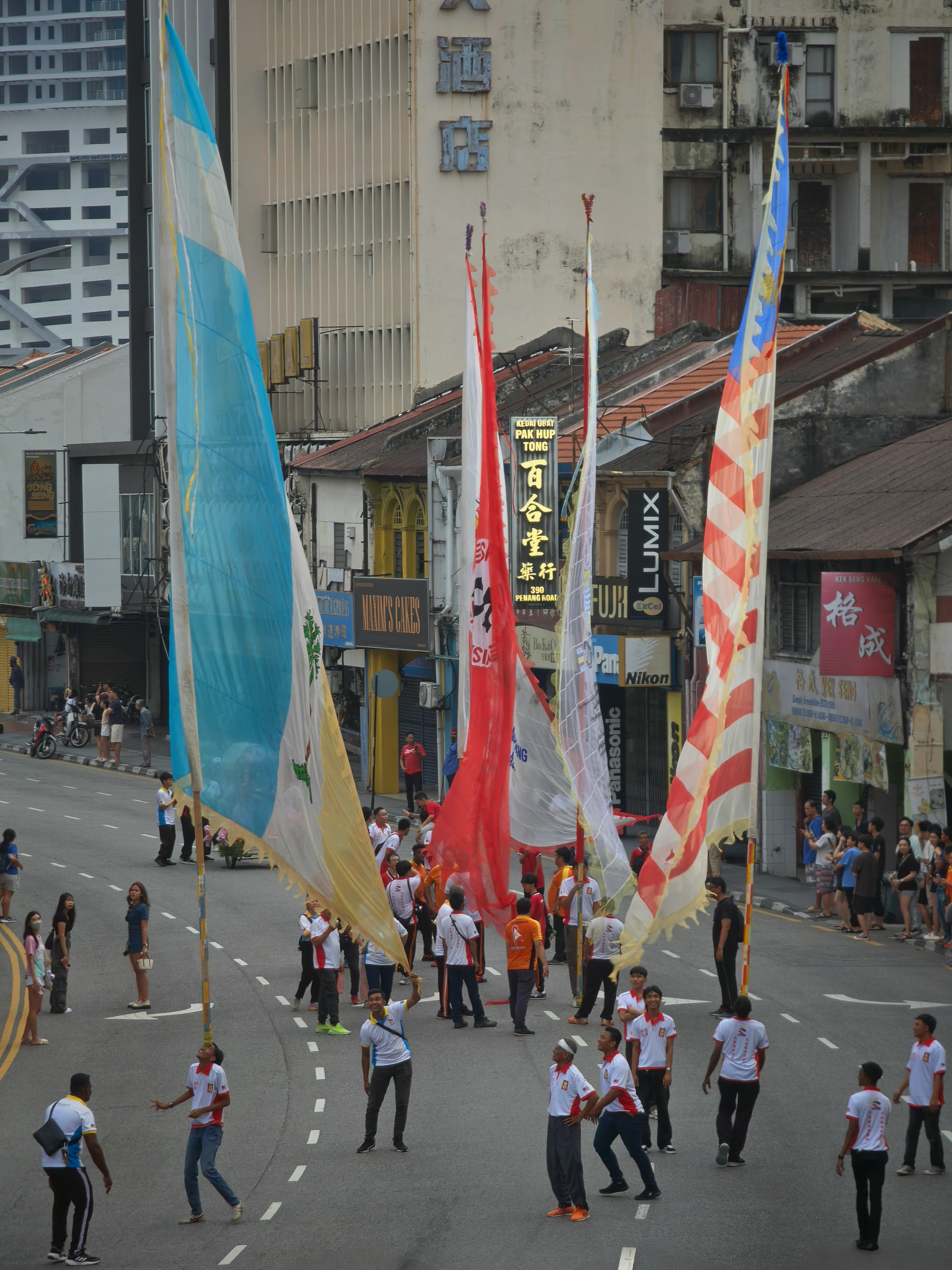
A Chingay procession in George Town

The Chingay Parade traces its origins to a float decorating competition held in Penang in 1905. This practice of float decoration spread to the rest of Malaya by the 1960s, and eventually became associated with the Chinese New Year.

The second Chingay procession was held in 1926 in celebration of the birthday of the God of Prosperity. The third Chingay procession was held in 1957 to celebrate the centenary of the City Council of George Town.

To ensure the continued existence of Chingay, the Chinese community in Malaysia worked together to bring enthusiasts from various areas together to form the Penang Chingay liaison committee in the 1960s.

A Chingay parade is now held annually within the city of George Town every December. The yearly event, which has attracted locals and tourists alike, starts in the evening from Brick Kiln Road (now Gurdwara Road), snaking through the city streets before ending at the Esplanade.

=== Johor ===
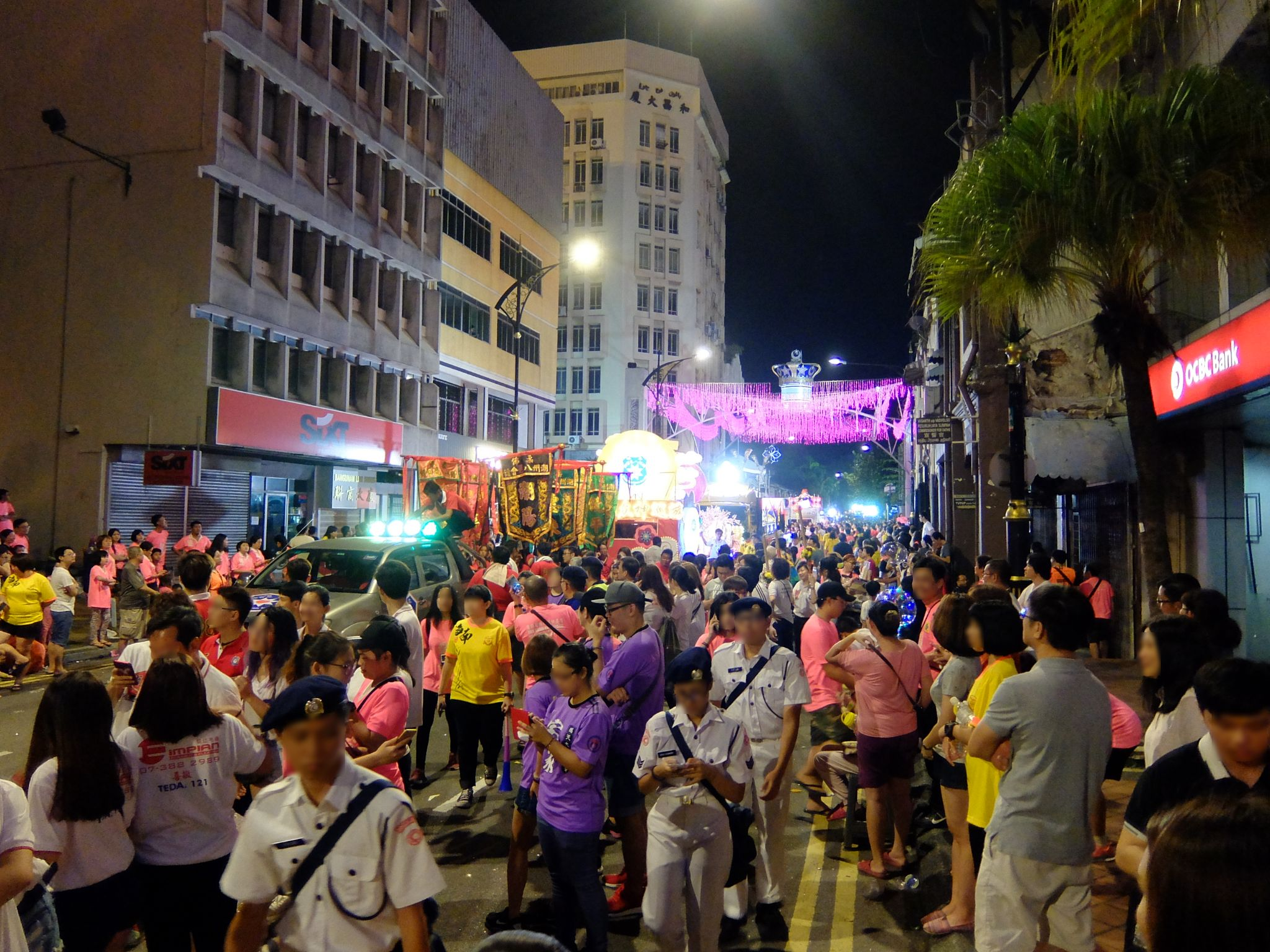
Johor Old Temple Chingay in Johor Bahru

The Chingay parade in Johor are held annually by the Johor Bahru Old Chinese Temple on the 21st day of the first month of the Lunar New Year since the 1870. It is joined by the five main clans in the state, which are Cantonese, Hainanese, Hakka, Hoklo and Teochew.

== Chingay in Singapore ==
In 1972, due to various fire hazards, inclusive of injuries, deaths and damage to properties, the Singapore government passed a bill to ban fireworks in Singapore. As a result, the inability to set off fireworks to celebrate the Lunar New Year caused general unhappiness and reduced public enthusiasm among the largely Chinese population in Singapore. According to People's Association (PA), prime minister Lee Kuan Yew decided to hold a Chingay parade to liven up the occasion.

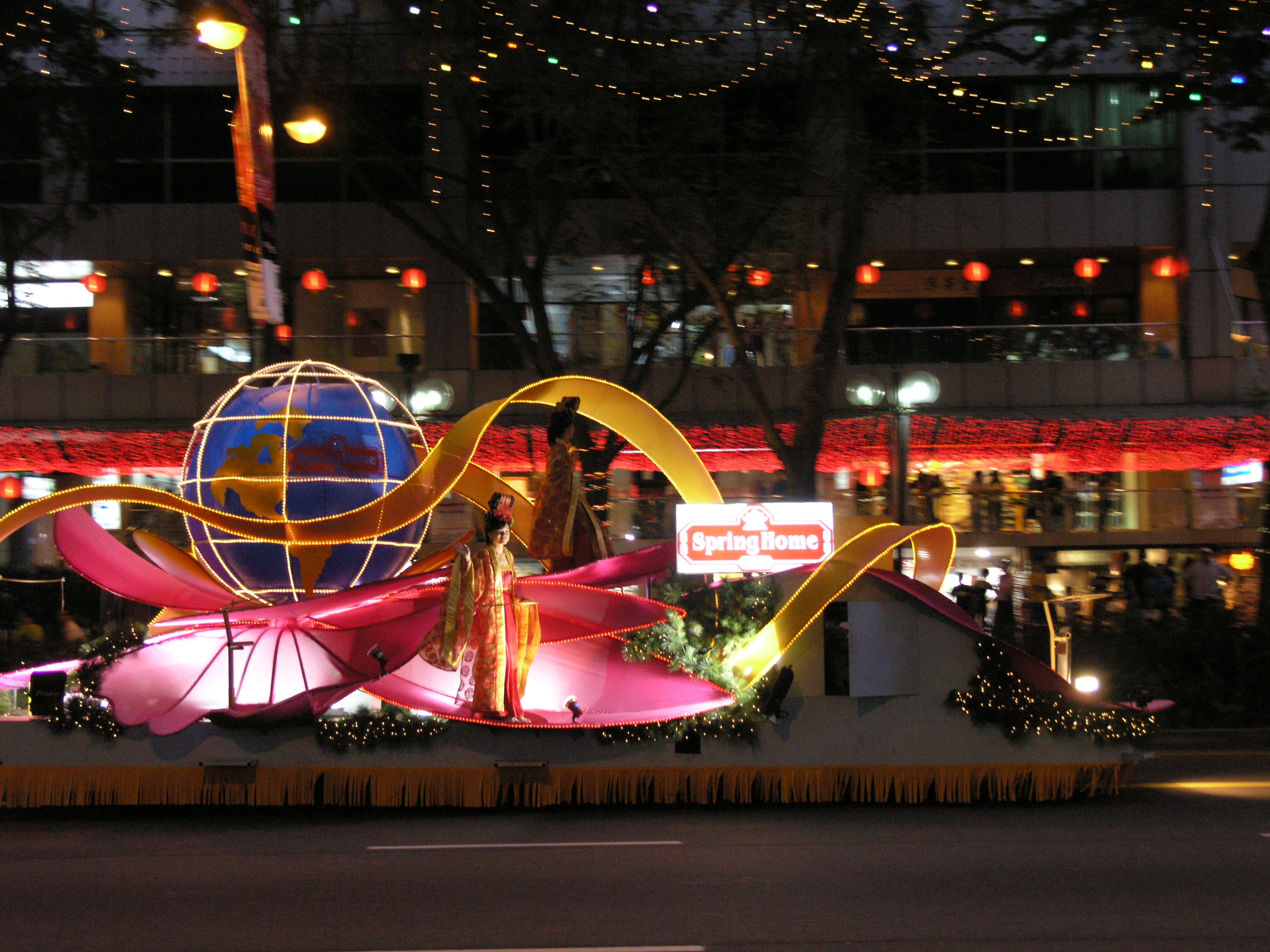
Singapore Chingay parade in 2005.

On 4 February 1973, PA and the Singapore National Pugilistic Association jointly organised the first Singapore Chingay parade, a street parade from Jalan Besar to Outram Park featuring floats, acrobatic acts, lion and dragon dances, stilt walkers and other performances.

The largely Chinese parade became a multi-cultural one from 1977 when Malay and Indian groups started joining in the performances, which was to mark a major precedent in the overall flavour of the parade into one which has become largely multi-cultural in character, despite the continued presence of traditional Chinese acts such as lion dances and stilt walkers to this day.

In 1985, the parade marched down Orchard Road for the first time, a move which was to prevail for much of the parade's subsequent history. Although the change could be attributed to the desire of organisers in bringing it closer to tourists along the major tourist belt and for ease of organisation on a relatively long and straight stretch of road, it also further signified the increasingly desinicized character of the parade. This is further evidenced when in 1987, an international flavour was added to the parade when a group from Japan participated for the first time with their float sponsored by The Straits Times.

The Chingay Parade became an evening-to-night parade in 1990, changing the overall feel of the parade towards one in which lights and pyrotechnics dominate. In 2000, the parade was shifted out of Orchard Road to the Civic District centering at City Hall, an area steeped in Singaporean history and culture. Construction works at the City Hall area resulted in the parade marching through the streets of the Chinatown district for the first time. Faced with limited space for spectator stands and a much more complicated and winding route in these locations, however, the parade moved back to Orchard Road in 2004 along with an effort to introduce audience participation and involvement in the traditionally passive parade. Firecrackers were let off for the first time in the parade that year. Despite the authorities allowing the firecrackers to be let off under some safety procedures, it was decided that the Chingay be preserved. In 2008, the parade was once again held at City Hall, with the route lasting from the City Hall building to The Esplanade. For the 2009 parade, it was centralised around Parliament House with the performers going around the Padang and also featured a magical Grand Finale (MAGICBOX@Chingay 2009). That year was also the first year that the telecast on television was delayed by one day. In 2010, the parade took place on part of the Formula One Marina Bay Street Circuit route.

Post-parade street parties have been held since 2004, with the exception of 2007. An estimated 150,000 spectators attended the 2009 Chingay Parade on 1 February. One million Singaporeans watched the parade on television and another 16.3 million homes and hotels across Asia received the television broadcast through Channel NewsAsia.

The 2011 Chingay Parade was held on the 11 and 12 February. It opened with a Fire Party, and included the largest moving multi-ethnic performances, the first travelling dance competition within the parade, a spectacular finale where thousands of performers flooded the parade ground holding candle lights and an inaugural colourful Arts District/ Carnival. It also included activities in which the public could participate, such as the Teresa Teng Look-Alike Photo Contest and the Chingay Paparazzi competition.

The 2013 Chingay parade was held on 22 and 23 February. In 2014, Chingay was held on 7 and 8 February at the F1 Pit Building. Some 70,000 individuals ushered in The Year of the Horse.

The 2015 Chingay was planned to involve some 11,000 performers from 150 organisations, including 760 overseas performers from 15 groups, in the largest celebration yet. Themed "We love Singapore(SG)", the main Chingay 2015 was planned to be held at the F1 Pit Building on 27 and 28 February, while a street party along Orchard Road involving youths would be held on 1 March.

The 2018 Chingay involved 2,000 parade volunteers and 6,500 parade performers, and also featured many examples of smart technology, including dancing robots and driverless cars. The 2018 Chingay was the first year to have a free street parade and carnival as part of the celebration, and followed a 1.5 kilometre route, double the length of the usual 720 metres.

The 2019 Chingay was purposed to commemorate Singapore's Bicentennial such that understanding of the island nation's history expanded beyond marking 200 years of Sir Stamford Raffles' arrival on the shores of Singapore in 1819 to a beginning that was even earlier at 1299 when the Kingdom of Singapura (also known as Temasek) was established. The theme for Chingay 2019, ‘Dreams Funtasia’, recognised the significance of the past, present and future of Singapore.

The 2020 Chingay was postponed and replaced by "eChingay Parade" instead due to COVID-19 pandemic, together with 2021 Chingay.

== UNESCO nomination ==
On 27 March 2025, Malaysia and Singapore officially submitted a joint nomination to inscribe "Chingay: a street parade that showcases multiculturalism, traditions, and artistic displays of communities" on UNESCO's Representative List of the Intangible Cultural Heritage of Humanity. The nomination presents Chingay as shared heritage practised in Singapore, Penang and Johor Bahru, and was submitted during the 60th anniversary year of bilateral relations between Malaysia and Singapore. A decision on the nomination is expected by the end of 2026 at the earliest.
