= Tan Hiok Nee =

Chinese major

Yang Berhormat Major China Dato' Tan Hiok Nee
- 陳旭年
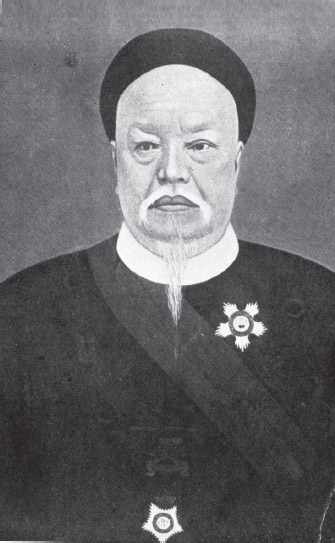
- Tan in One Hundred Years' History of the Chinese in Singapore (1923)

Major China of Johor
- In office 1870–1875
- Preceded by: Kapitan Seah Tee Heng
- Succeeded by: Kapitan Lim Ah Siang
- Constituency: Johor

Members to the Council of State of Johor
- In office 1874–1875
- Preceded by: -

2nd The Leader of the Ngee Heng Kongsi of Johor
- In office 1864–1885
- Preceded by: Kapitan Tan Kee Soon
- Succeeded by: Kapitan Lim Ah Siang

Personal details
- Born: Tan Yeok Nee 陳毓宜; 1827 Chaoshan, Qing empire
- Died: 21 May 1902 (aged 75) Chaoshan, Qing empire

Major China Dato' Tan Hiok Nee (Chinese: 陳旭年; pinyin: Chén Xùnián; Pe̍h-ōe-jī: Tân Hiok-nî; 1827 – 21 May 1902), also known as Tan Yeok Nee (Chinese: 陳毓宜), was the leader of the Ngee Heng Kongsi of Johor, succeeding Tan Kee Soon in circa 1864, he transformed the Ngee Heng Kongsi of Johor from a quasi-military revolutionary brotherhood, based in the rural settlement of Kangkar Tebrau, into an organisation of kapitans, kangchus, and revenue farmers, based in the state capital of Johor Bahru. His grandson Tan Chin Hian, was the chairman of the Singapore Chinese Chamber of Commerce, Singapore Teochew Poit It Huay Kuan and Ngee Ann Kongsi Singapore for many years.

== Early life ==
Tan was born Tan Yeok Nee into a Teochew family from Jin Sha Village, Caitang Town of the former Chaozhou Fu, China in 1827. He was later known as Tan Hiok Nee, and started his working life as a cloth peddler and in the course of his frequent visits to Wan Abu Bakar's home in Telok Blangah of Singapore, where he became a friend of the royal family. He subsequently extended his textile business to Johor Bahru where many textile shops still line Jalan Tan Hiok Nee, a road named after him, and where he used to stay. With the help of the Temenggong, Tan moved to Johor in 1853. He obtained his first surat sungai (river document) of Bukit Berangan, a tributary of the Johor River in 1853, then aged 26 in partnership with Tan Ban Tye. There, he began cultivation of pepper and gambier. This was to form the beginning of a vast holding of 9 such grants which made him the largest holder of kangchu concessions, as well as the wealthiest and most influential Chinese in Johor. A map of Johor Bahru drawn in 1887 shows Tan Hiok Nee as the owner of several lots of land in the centre of Johor Bahru where he owned many shops and houses as well as started a market on an island called Pulau Segget, midpoint of Sungai Segget. In 1854, he started develop the left bank of the Johor River. Within 5 September 1863 – 11 September 1863, Tan Hiok Nee obtained four additional kang-chu rights within a one-week period. On 5 September 1863, he received a Surat Sungai granting him the rights to three adjacent river: Keringkim (or Kim Kim), Kong Kong and Tukang. By then, he was the most prominent businessman in Johor with seven kangchu rights. This meant controls over the entire left bank of the Johor River which spanned from the south of Kota Tinggi to Pulau Ubin.

== Revenue farming and the Great Opium Syndicate ==
With Tan's grants, he went into pepper and gambier planting which led naturally to trading in these crops, and eventually became a major pepper and gambier trader at Boat Quay in Singapore. He held the opium and spirit farm for Johor for various periods but in 1870–79, he joined with Tan Seng Poh and Cheang Hong Lim to form the Great Opium Syndicate which managed to gain control of the opium and spirit farm not only in Johor, but also the vastly lucrative revenue farms in Singapore, Melaka, and Riau. Like Tan Kee Soon, Tan Hiok Nee was a trusted friend of Sultan Abu Bakar and with his enormous wealth, may even have been one of the Sultan's financiers.

== Levers of wealth and power ==
In 1870, Tan was appointed as "Major China of Johor", a governmental appointment that was assisted by an assistant treasurer, a head clerk, and a head inspector. The position was apparently created specially for him since Johor at that time already had two kapitans, namely Kapitan Tan Cheng Hung in Tebrau and Kapitan Seah Tee Heng in Johor Bahru. In addition, Tan was also appointed as one of two Chinese members to the Council of State, and the first Chinese to receive the title of Dato' S.P.M.J. ( Seri Paduka Mahkota Johor Yang Amat Mulia ). However, what made him so powerful among the Chinese community in Johor was his position as the leader of the Ngee Heng Kongsi after Tan Kee Soon's death in circa 1864. By then, however, Md Salleh bin Perang had been appointed Chief of Police and the policing responsibilities that Tan Kee Soon had been entrusted with were now carried out by Johor officials. Under the circumstances, the Ngee Heng Kongsi was now more like an organisation of towkays who financed the plantations and operated the profitable revenue farms. Nevertheless, with his position as Kapitan Cina and head of the Ngee Heng Kongsi, as well as being a partner in the Great Opium Syndicate, Tan held all the levers of wealth and power available to a Chinese during his time.

== Philanthropy ==
Tan Hiok Nee cherished Jinsha Caitang, his hometown in China, with deep feelings. He spent 14 years, starting from the ninth years of Tongzhi (1870) in the Qing period, building the "Congxi Ancestral Hall" in his hometown. Cong Xi Ancestral Hall, located in Jinsha Caitang, Chaozhou City, Guangdong Province, with its exquisite stone carving architecture, was listed in the sixth batch of protected key national cultural relics on May 25, 2006, by China's State Council.

He also contributed to China during the Qing Dynastry. When China was hit by a series of serious natural disasters, he actively responded to the Qing government's disaster relief request, and contributed the largest amount of money to Shaanxi and other province famine victims. Empress Cixi therefore bestowed his "two bows" (慈禧太后因而赐他二品顶戴), and constructed an arch with the words "Zealousness for Public Interests" in his hometown as a memorial for Tan Hiok Nee. Hence the characters 资政第 “Zi Zheng Di” are until today prominently displayed at his ancestral home; it gives us a sense of its occupant's high rank. Specifically, these characters tell us that the house is the residence of a Qing Dynasty Second Ranked Official.

== Retirement ==
In 1875, Tan inexplicably gave up his connection with Johor entirely, selling off all his concessions and withdrawing completely from Johor to settle in Singapore. It was speculated that his political rivals had removed him during the Maharaja's absence due to their resentment of his prominence and power. After his departure, Tan's assets and kang-chu rights were repossessed by the Johor government. Nevertheless, he chose his timing well for he withdrew at a time when Johor was standing at the peak of its progress under the rule of Sultan Abu Bakar. However, for the Ngee Heng, it was the beginning of the slide downhill. The administrative structure of government was well established and was managed by a core of able and experienced officers led by the much respected Dato' Jaafar bin Mohamed as Menteri Besar. Even so, he continued to have a towering presence in the Kongsi as his successor, Lim Ah Siang, was referred to only as Second Brother, the second most senior-ranking member in the secret society hierarchy.

During the visit of the Royal Princes (Albert Victor and George) to Johore in 1882, Tan Yoek Nee was a member of the Entertainment committee.

Tan Hiok Nee lived on Coleman Street at the Hotel de la Paix after he left Johore and in 1885 he proceeded to build himself a magnificent mansion in Singapore at the corner of Tank Street. He sold off this house in Singapore due to the noise of the nearby railway, and eventually returned to China to become one of the few migrants who made good overseas and returned to end his days in his native village. He died on 21 May 1902 at the age of 75.

== Descendants ==
Tan had five sons. His second son, Chen Ding Xing, was a government official in China's Jiang Xi province. All his sons died before him. Tan's eight grandsons – including Tan Chin Boon, Tan Chin Teat, Tan Chin Yeow and Tan Chin Hean – inherited his properties and were well known within the Teochew community in Singapore. Tan Chin Hean was a prominent elite of society who served as vice-chairman of the Ngee Ann Kongsi, President of the Singapore Chinese Chamber of Commerce and headed the Teochew Huay Kuan.

== See also ==
- House of Tan Yeok Nee
- Kangchu system
- Ngee Heng Kongsi of Johor
- List of Kapitan Cina

Government offices
Preceded by Kapitan Seah Tee Heng	Kapitan Cina of Johor; 1870–1875	Succeeded by Kapitan Lim Ah Siang
