= Seah Eu Chin =

Singaporean businessperson (1805 – 1883)

- 佘有進
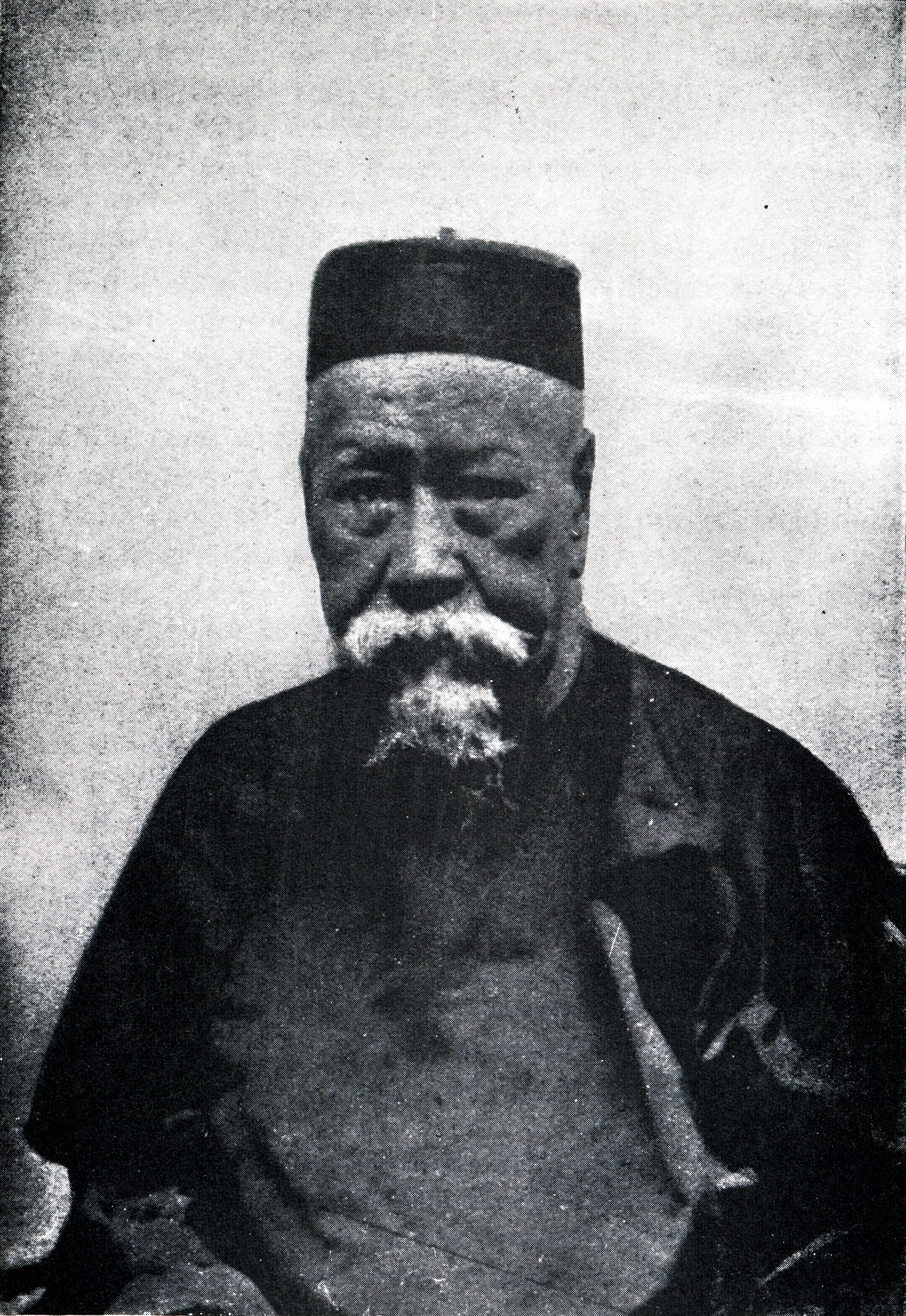
- Seah in One Hundred Years' History of the Chinese in Singapore (1923)
- Born: August 30, 1805; Chenghai, Guangdong, Qing Empire
- Died: September 23, 1883 (aged 78); Singapore, Straits Settlements
- Other name: Siah U-Chin
- Occupations: Merchant, financier
- Known for: Founder of Ngee Ann Kongsi

Seah Eu Chin
- Traditional Chinese: 佘有進
- Simplified Chinese: 佘有进
Transcriptions
Standard Mandarin
- Hanyu Pinyin: Shé Yǒujìn
Yue: Cantonese
- Jyutping: Se4 Jau5 Zeon3
Southern Min
- Hokkien POJ: Siâ Iú-chìn
- Teochew Peng'im: sia5 iu2zing3

Seah Eu Chin ; a.k.a. Siah U-chin, Seah Uchin or Seah You Chin; 1805 – 1883) was an immigrant from South China to Singapore, later becoming a successful merchant, a prominent descendant of Seah Clan and leader in the Overseas Chinese community.

He became known as the "Gambier King" for his extensive plantations for pepper and gambier.

== Early life ==
Seah Eu Chin was born in 1805 as the son of Seah Keng Liat (Chinese: 佘慶烈; pinyin: Shé Qìngliè; Jyutping: Se4 Hing3 Lit6; Pe̍h-ōe-jī: Siâ Khèng-lia̍t), a minor provincial official of Guek-po (i.e. Chinese: "月浦" in Teochew dialect) Village at the Chenghai County of the former Chaozhou Fu. He was educated in Chinese classics in his youth, but decided to seek his fortune abroad. He came to Singapore in 1823, first working as a clerk, then becoming a plantation owner and finally becoming a trader and a merchant.

== Plantation and mercantile activity ==
Seah Eu Chin was a successful plantation owner. He was the first to plant pepper and gambier (or white cutch) on a large scale in Singapore. By 1839, his gambier plantation had stretched for eight to ten miles, from the upper end of River Valley Road to Bukit Timah Road and Thomson Road. Mr Seah's holdings earned him the title: 'King of Gambier'. He made his fortune in gambier and pepper plantations. However, by the 1850s–60s, the planting of gambier and pepper was becoming less profitable in Singapore for several reasons, including the increasing scarcity of uncleared land for planting (gambier quickly exhausted the soil and so plantations had to keep shifting), the shortage of firewood from the clearing of forests, and the lack of land on Singapore Island itself.

Therefore, in his later years, he became involved in trading as a merchant and agent under the name of Eu Chin Co. which was based in North Bridge Road. His sons, especially the eldest, Seah Cheo Seah, and second son Seah Liang Seah, helped manage the business, as did his brother-in-law, Tan Seng Poh.

== Family life ==
In 1837, he married a daughter of Tan Ah Hun, the Kapitan Cina (i.e. leader of the Chinese community) of Perak. She died soon after from the effects of smallpox, and about a year later, he married her sister with whom he had several children. His brother-in-law, Tan Seng Poh, came with his sister to Singapore to be educated there. Seng Poh was an opium and spirit farmer (i.e. he ran a government-tendered monopoly processing raw opium imported from British India. The Opium and Spirit Farm, or Excise, was the main source of income for the Straits Settlements) and helped manage Eu Chin's mercantile firm after the latter's retirement in 1864. Most prominent among his children were Seah Liang Seah and Seah Peck Seah, both of whom also became Justices of the Peace (JP) and prominent members of the Chinese community; the former was also an unofficial member of the Legislative Council of the Straits Settlements. His eldest son, Seah Cheo Seah, was also a JP but he died only two years after his father, in 1885. He had another son, Seah Song Seah, who died in China, and three daughters, about whom very little is known.

== Community leadership ==
In 1830, he and representatives of twelve Teochew clans set up the Ngee Ann Kun which later became the Ngee Ann Kongsi in 1845. He was the chairman of the Kongsi until his death whereupon power passed to his sons Seah Cheo Seah and Seah Liang Seah, followed by his grandson Seah Eng Tong, resulting in a Seah monopoly on power in the Kongsi until 1928. Resentment against them caused the formation of another Teochew clan association, the Teochew Poit Ip Huay Kuan.

Seah Eu Chin helped run Tan Tock Seng Hospital when it was first set up, being a member, and in some years treasurer, of its management committee.

Just as the European merchant community used Chinese middlemen in conducting their business, the Straits Settlements government relied on prominent Chinese businessmen to act as go-betweens with the Chinese community. Seah Eu Chin was the go-between with the Teochew community, which originated from the Chaozhou province of Southern China. He assisted efforts to restore order during several community disturbances, including the 1854 Hokkien–Teochew Riots, which began on 5 May 1854. Contemporary accounts attributed the outbreak of violence to a dispute over the price of rice between members of the Hokkien and Teochew communities, although historians have suggested that broader tensions between the two groups may also have contributed to the conflict. More than 400 people were reportedly killed during 10 days of violence. British authorities in Singapore met with Chinese community leaders, including Seah Eu Chin representing the Teochews and Tan Kim Ching representing the Hokkiens, who assisted in efforts to end the unrest.

He was an early member of the Singapore Chamber of Commerce, established in 1837, and was made a Justice of the Peace in 1867. He had also been a member of the Grand Jury since 1851, and also had cases involving Chinese referred to him by the court. In 1872, he was made an honorary police magistrate, along with four other Chinese including his brother-in-law Tan Seng Poh.

== Last years ==
Seah Eu Chin finally retired from business in 1864, to concentrate on scholarly pursuits, though he still had an interest in community affairs. For instance, his name is with that of several other Chinese on a petition submitted to the government requesting the suppression of illegal "Wah-Weh" gambling among the Chinese community. In the last decade of his life he lived in a mansion built by his son Seah Cheo Seah that was among the Four Mansions (Chinese: 四大厝; pinyin: Sì dà cuò) of the 19th-century Chinese in Singapore.

He died on 23 September 1883, and his widow in 1905. He was buried in the family estate near the SLF Building along Thomson Road. His tomb was re-discovered in late 2012.

Several streets in Singapore are named for Seah Eu Chin and his sons, namely Eu Chin Street for Seah, Liang Seah Street, and Peck Seah Street. Seah Street, in Bras Basah, is believed to be named after the Seah family.
