= Wee Ah Hood =

Singaporean businessman (1828–1875)

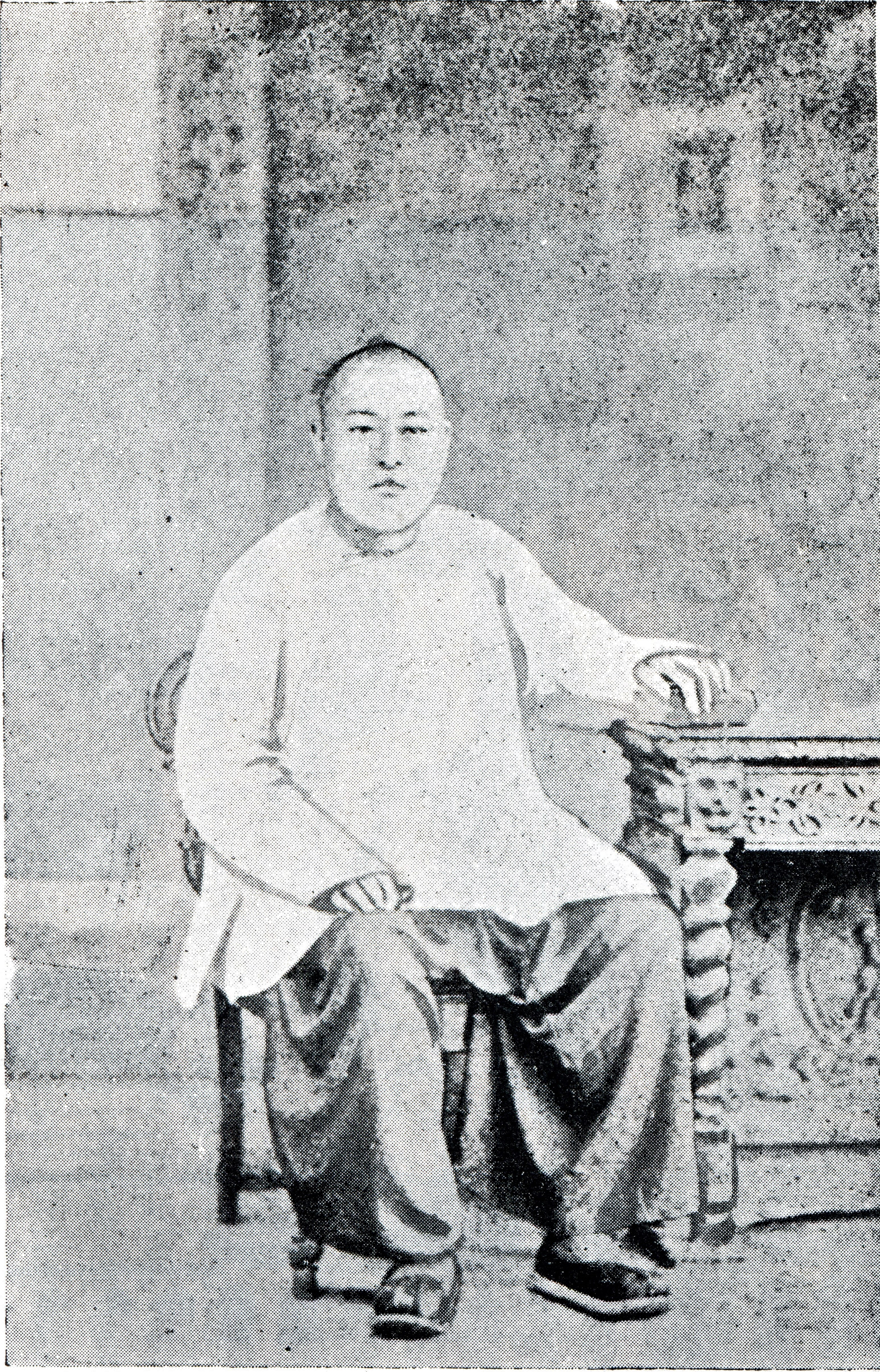
- Wee in One Hundred Years' History of the Chinese in Singapore (1923)
- Born: 1828
- Died: 1875 (aged 46–47)

Wee Ah Hood (Simplified Chinese: 黄亚佛; Traditional Chinese: 黃亞佛) (1828–1875) was a prominent pepper and gambier plantation owner in the colony of Singapore in the Straits Settlements. He lived in the House of Wee Ah Hood, which was one of four well-known Chinese-style mansions in Singapore.

== Biography ==
Wee was born on Circular Road in 1828 to Teochew trader Wee Ah Heng, who died when Wee was six months old. He was initially an assistant in a cloth-dealer's shop, and later became the manager. Following the retirement of his boss, he established his own business, Ah Hood & Co., which included various types of products. The business was very successful, making him one of the largest pepper and gambier merchants during his time. His eldest son, Wee Kim Yan, was born in 1855. Wee died in 1875 in his residence.

The House of Wee Ah Hood, which was commonly regarded as one of four well-known Chinese-style mansions in Singapore, was constructed in 1878 on 49 Hill Street. Ah Hood Road was named after him.
