= Johor Bahru Old Chinese Temple =

Chinese temple in Johor, Malaysia

- Malay: Tokong Cina Lama Johor Bahru; Chinese: 柔佛古廟
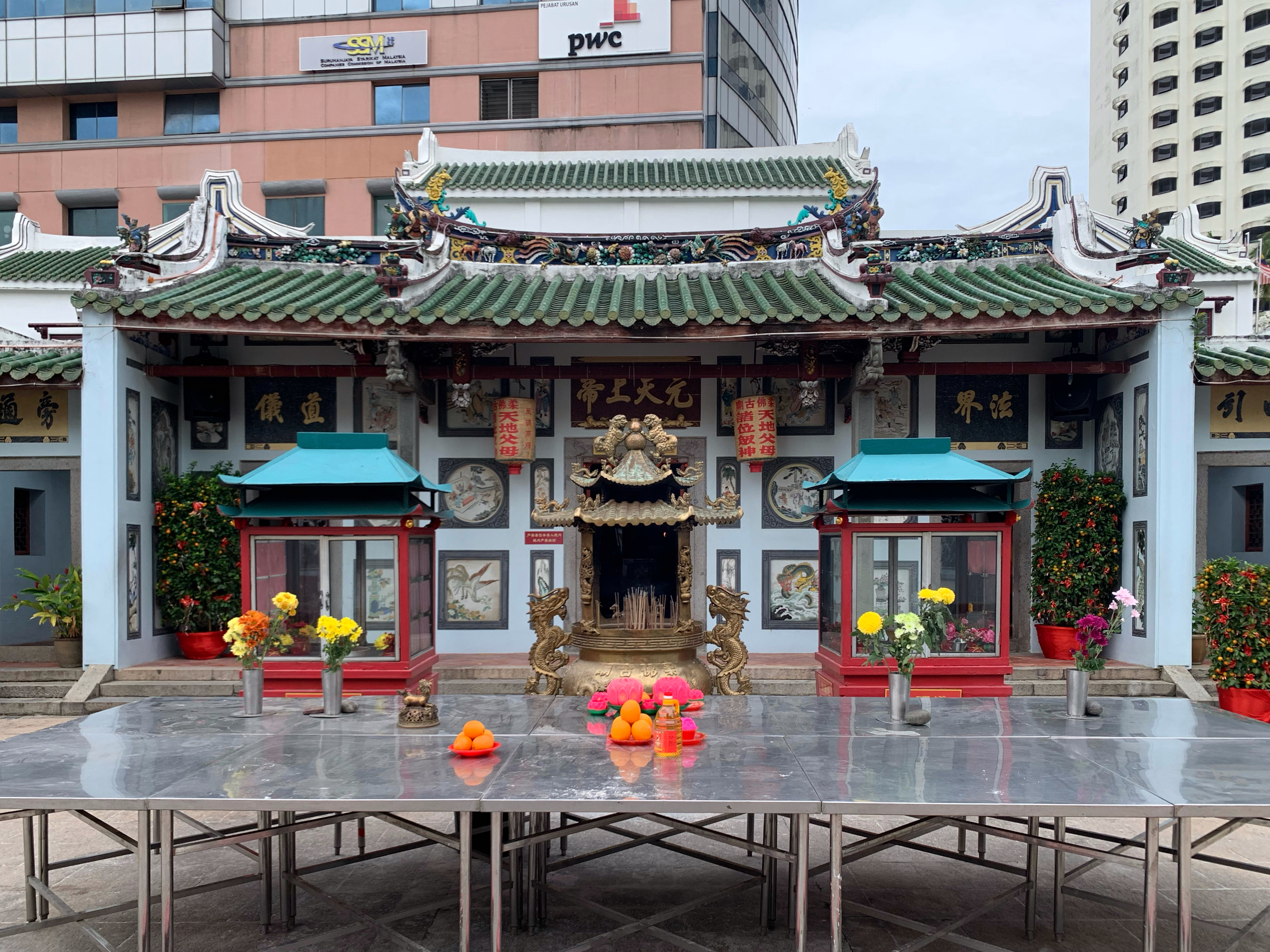
- Front facade of the main temple building in 2025

Religion
- Affiliation: Taoism, Buddhism, Confucianism
- District: Johor Bahru District
- Deity: Yuan Tian Shang Di (元天上帝) (Main deity) Hong Xian Da Di (洪仙大帝); Gan Tian Da Di (感天大帝); Hua Guang Da Di (华光大帝) Zhao Da Yuan Shuai (赵大元帅)

Location
- Location: Johor Bahru
- State: Johor
- Country: Malaysia
- Interactive map of Johor Bahru Old Chinese Temple
- Coordinates: 1°27′38.0″N 103°45′47.0″E

Architecture
- Type: Chinese temple
- Founder: Tan Hiok Nee
- Established: 1870s

Johor Bahru Old Chinese Temple
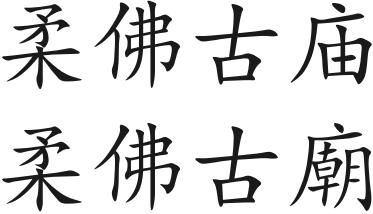
- Johor Bahru Old Chinese Temple in Simplified Chinese (top) and Traditional Chinese character (below)
- Traditional Chinese: 柔佛古廟
- Simplified Chinese: 柔佛古庙
Transcriptions
Standard Mandarin
- Hanyu Pinyin: Róufó Gǔmiào
Southern Min
- Hokkien POJ: Jiû-hut Kó͘-biō
- Tâi-lô: Jiû-hut Kóo-biō

Johor Bahru Old Chinese Temple (Chinese: 柔佛古廟; pinyin: Róufú Gǔmiào; Pe̍h-ōe-jī: Jiû-hut Kó͘-biō) known as Old Temple (Chinese: 古廟; pinyin: Gǔmiào; Pe̍h-ōe-jī: Kó͘-biō) by the locals, is a Chinese temple located in Johor Bahru, Johor, Malaysia. Located at Jalan Trus, the temple is flanked by modern skyscrapers. This temple is one of the oldest structures in the city and has become the symbol of unity among the seven Chinese dialect groups namely Teochews, Hoklo (Hokkiens), Cantonese, Hakka, Foochowese, Henghua and Hainanese peoples.

In 2007, a documentary series called My Roots featured the temple in the episode "Grand March with the Deities".

== History ==
The temple history dates back as early as between 1870 and 1880 in the 19th century. Since the relationship between the local Chinese are very warm with the Johor monarchy, Sultan Abu Bakar encouraged the Chinese to build their places of worship and for the burial by providing them land. The temple was then founded by then Head of Ngee Heng Company led by Tan Hiok Nee. In 1981, the temple was proposed to undergoing renovation with the request was accepted in 1994 with total expenditure of RM1.5 million. The renovated temple was then completed in the following year in December 1995 with much of its cultural design are being preserved and important relics such as the century-old bronze bell, incense burner and wooden tablet remain.

== Features ==
Two old artefacts located inside the temple which are the plaque and bronze bell. The main alcove of the temple holds the image of the main deity, Yuan Tian Shang Di. There are five deities inside the temple with each of them are separately worshipped by the main ethnic Chinese groups such as the dominant Teochew, Hoklo (Hokkien), Cantonese, Hakka and Hainanese people (and to a lesser extent Henghua as well as the Fuzhounese):

- Yuan Tian Shang Di (元天上帝) (大老爷)
- Hong Xian Da Di (洪仙大帝) (洪仙公)
- Gan Tian Da Di (感天大帝)
- Hua Guang Da Di (华光大帝)
- Zhao Da Yuan Shuai (赵大元帅)

== The annual Chingay parade ==
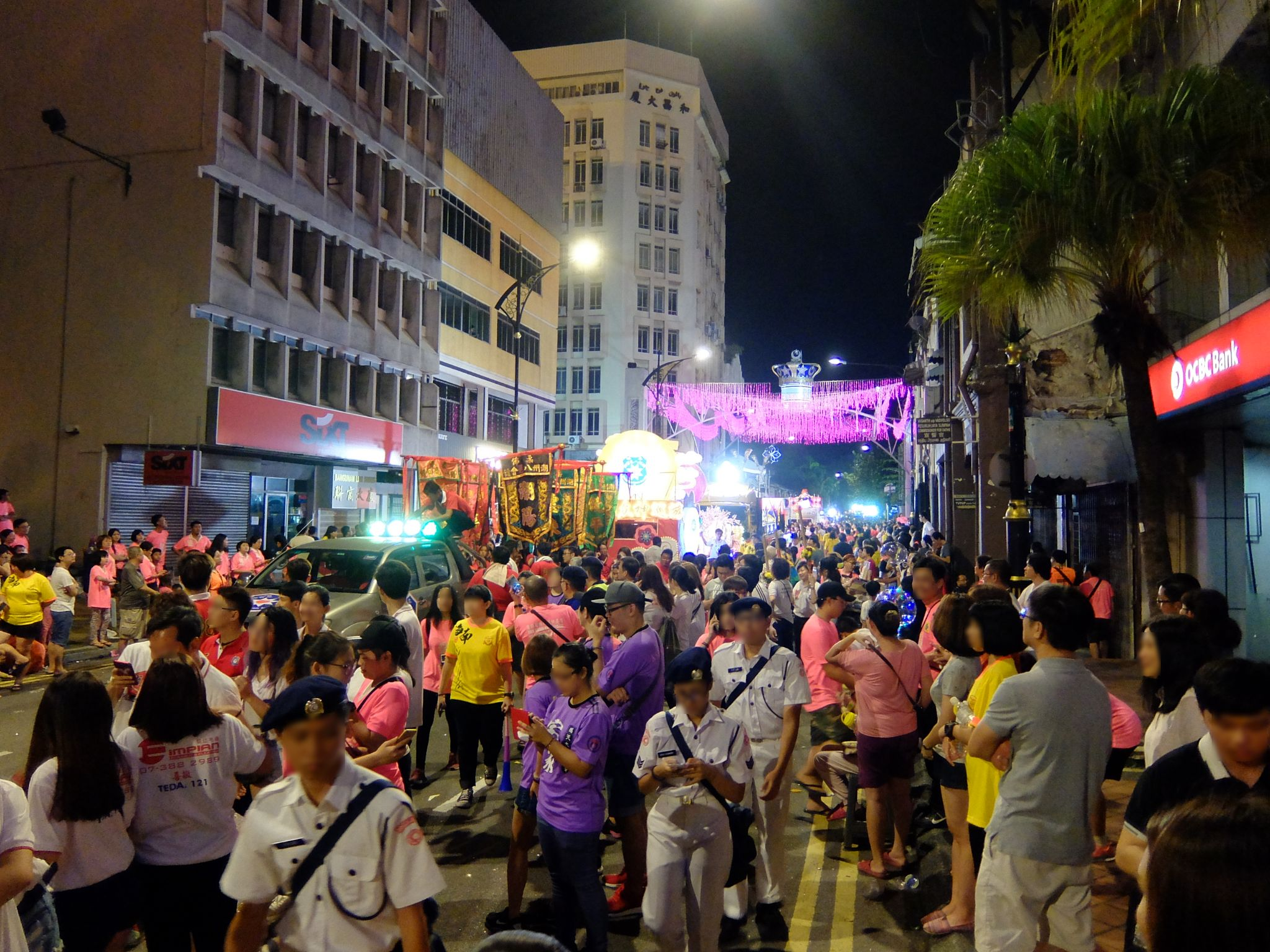
The annual Chingay parade

Every year in the first lunar month of 20–23rd, the temple organises its annual Chingay known as the "Parade of Deities" (Chinese: 古廟游神). The parade lasts for four days with the final is on the night of the 3rd day when the deities parade around the Johor Bahru city centre. The annual parade attracted more than 300,000 people to march around the major roads of the city together with the five deities being worshipped in the old temple. In 2021, date changed to 1st–15th of the first lunar month.
