= Tan Kee Soon =

Kapitan China Tan Kye Soon
- 陳開順

Kapitan Cina of Johor
- In office 1845–1857
- Preceded by: New creation
- Succeeded by: Tan Cheng Hung

Personal details
- Born: 14 November 1803 Chaozhou, Guangdong, Qing Empire
- Died: 1 February 1857 (aged 53) Johor, British Malaya

Kapitan China Tan Kye Soon (simplified Chinese: 陈开顺; traditional Chinese: 陳開順; pinyin: Chén Kāishùn; Pe̍h-ōe-jī: Tân Khai-sūn; 14 November 1803 – 1 February 1857) was the first leader of Ngee Heng Kongsi of Johor, and also the first Kapitan China of Tebrau, Johor Bahru. On 22 October 1844, he was granted the first Surat Sungai on Tebrau to become the first Kangchu of Tebrau.

== Early life ==
Tan was born in Dongfengzhen, Chao'an, Chaozhou, Guangdong, of the Qing dynasty. He joined the secret society Tiandihui as a young man.

Tan was one of the leaders of the Ngee Heng Kongsi in Singapore who in 1846 ordered the 4,000 members of its brotherhood to relocate in Johor in protest against the imposition of quit rent in Singapore. He settled in Johor having obtained a surat sungai (river document) for Sungai Tebrau in 1844. He established a pepper and gambier settlement at Tan Chukang at Kangkar Tebrau, the oldest known Chinese settlement in Johor. However, he did not obtain more than the one grant, unlike other Ngee Heng leaders who held multiple concessions. Chinese sources described him as a yishi, a righteous political dissident who resisted the Manchus. In fact, the site of Tan Chukang, located deep in the jungle, suggests that it was selected as a place of refuge. As such, he would have been in command of military resources which would have been an asset to Sultan Abu Bakar during the crucial period when he was establishing authority over Johor.

After the death of Sultan Hussein, a treaty was brokered by the British in 1855 by which his son, Ali, acquired the coveted title of Sultan of Johor while the sovereignty of Johor was ceded to Temenggong Daeng Ibrahim, except for a small territory between the Kesang and Muar rivers. After some years, when Muar disobeyed Sultan Abu Bakar, Tan raised an army and went to pacify Muar.

The Sultan came to trust Tan, who was subsequently commissioned by the Johor government to be responsible for police functions in the absence of a properly constituted police force. Since he was also the leader of the Ngee Heng Kongsi, the government specifically permitted its open activities. Tan, did not live to see the Ngee Heng Kongsi officially recognised, for he died about 1864. It is possible that he could have a tacit understanding with the Sultan or even with the Temenggong. Although Tan was succeeded by his adopted son, Tan Chem Chung, as kangchu and Kapitan China in Tebrau. He was succeeded by Tan Hiok Nee as the leader of the Ngee Heng Kongsi.

== Sources ==
Ahmad, A. (2003). New Terrains in Southeast Asian History. Ohio University: Center for International Studies

Government offices
Preceded by New creation	Kapitan Cina of Johor; 1845–1857	Succeeded by Tan Cheng Hung
