= Bernam Street =

One-way street in Singapore

Coordinates: 1.2735°N 103.8439°E

Bernam Street (Chinese: 柏南街) is a one-way street located in Tanjong Pagar, Singapore.

Bernam Street starts at its junction with Tanjong Pagar Road and ends with its junction with Anson Road.

== Etymology ==
The street was named after the Bernam River, which flows between the states of Perak and Selangor in Peninsular Malaysia. The naming was due to a 1898 municipal resolution to "use names of rivers and districts in the Malay Peninsula as being better adapted to the purpose [of naming streets] than the names of persons or families".
