= Tan Seng Poh =

Singaporean businessman and civic leader

Tan Seng Poh (1830 - 13 December 1879), was a chairman of the Singapore Municipal Committee, a Justice of the Peace and an honorary magistrate.

== Biography ==
Tan was born in 1830 in Ipoh, as the son of Tan Ah Hun, the Kapitan Cina of Perak. When he was nine, his sister married wealthy merchant Seah Eu Chin, and he followed them to the Colony of Singapore, becoming the right-hand man of Seah. He was in good terms with Sultan Abu Bakar of Johor, and gained the patent right to sell Opium in Johor. Through the opium trade, he managed to make a fortune. When Seah retired in 1864, Tan took over Seah's business. In 1865, he succeeded in raising $500 for scholarships for European and Eurasian scholars. On 31 July 1869, Tan and Lee Cheng Tee launched a new gunpowder magazine in Tanah Merah.

In 1871, Tan was appointed the chairman of the Singapore Municipal Committee, and was the first Chinese to serve in the committee. In 1872, he was made a Justice of the Peace and an honorary magistrate. When his term expired in 1873, he offered himself for re-election, and won against E. J. Wells. In 1879, after his term expired, he offered himself for re-election, but lost to Edwin Koek.

== Personal life ==
Tan had two sons, Tan Keng Swee and Tan Keng Wah. Tan's residence, known as the House of Tan Seng Poh, was commonly regarded as one of four well-known Chinese-style mansions in Singapore.

Tan died on 13 December 1879, and his funeral was held on 26 January 1880, on the same day as the funeral of Chua Moh Choon. Seng Poh Road and Seng Poh Lane were named after him.
