= Tras Street =

Street in Singapore

Coordinates: 1.2763°N 103.8418°E

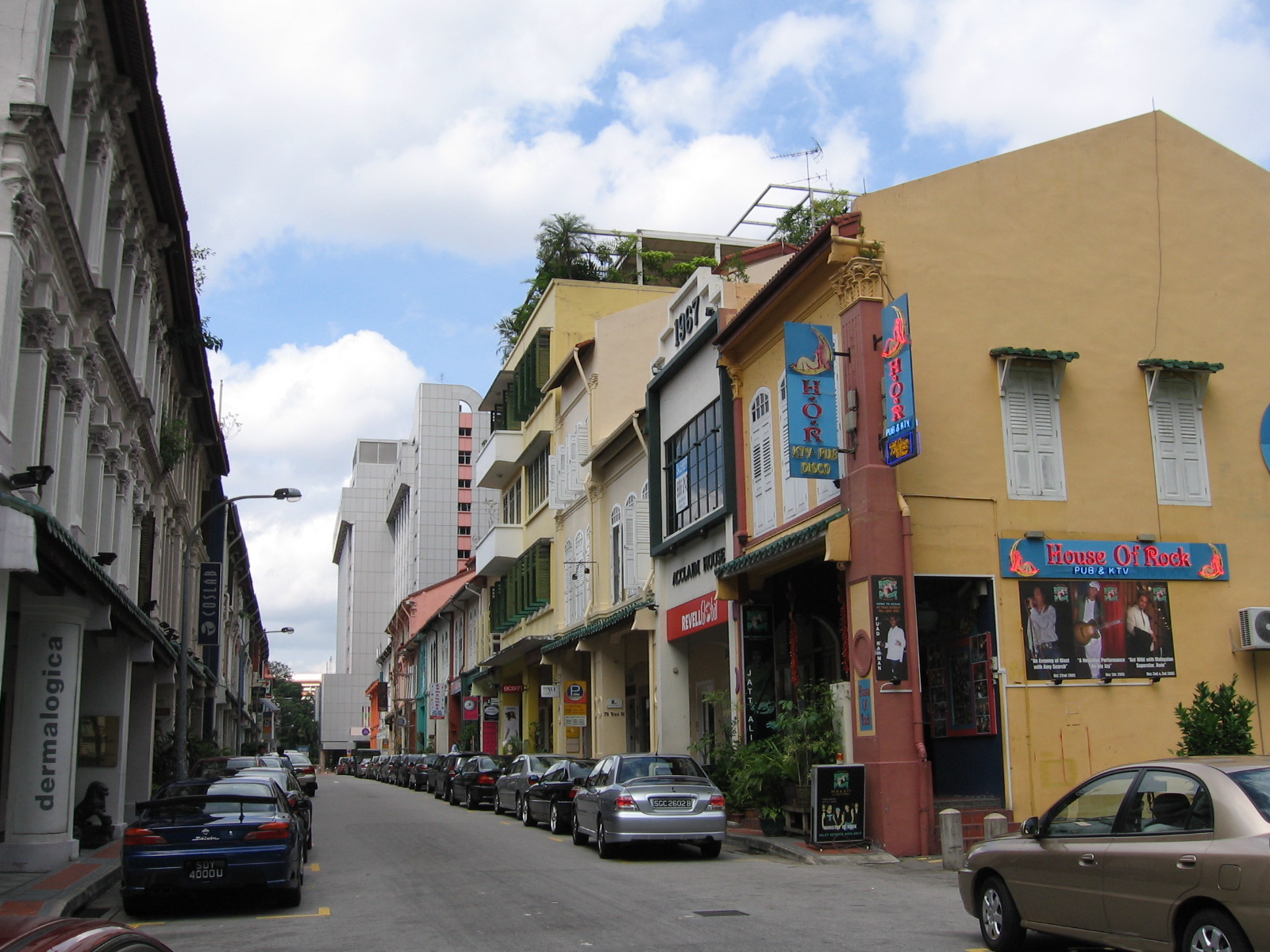
Tras Street, Tanjong Pagar, Singapore.

Tras Street is a street located in Tanjong Pagar in the Outram Planning Area and Downtown Core in Singapore. The road connects Enggor Street and Gopeng Street to Cook Street, and is intersected by Wallich Street.

== Etymology and history ==
The street is named after Tras, a small town near Raub, Pahang, Malaya. It dates from an 1898 municipal resolution to "use names of rivers and districts in the Malay Peninsula as being better adapted to the purpose [of naming streets] than the names of persons or families". Other Malayan place names which were assigned in the same year to new streets laid out on either side of Anson Road near Tanjong Pagar included Bernam (after the Bernam River between Selangor and Perak), Gopeng (after Gopeng near Ipoh, Perak), Enggor (after Enggor, Perak) and Raub (after Raub, Pahang).

== Hong San See Temple ==
The Hong San See Temple, which means "Phoenix Hill Temple" in Hokkien, by migrants from Lam Ann County in Fujian Province. The temple used to be located at Tras Street when it was first built in 1836. A road widening project in 1907 involving government acquisition of the temple's site resulted in its relocation to Mohamed Sultan Road.

== Tras Street today ==
Tras Street today is lined with many shophouses, many of which are two- and three-storey buildings. These shophouses, some of which are conserved pre-war buildings, are home to shops, eating places, pubs, boutiques and offices. The street is in fact a well-known night spot because of its string of bars. Being part of the Tanjong Pagar Conservation area, and found within the historic district of Chinatown, there are efforts to bring back the old charms of Chinatown to Tras Street.

== Alternate names ==
The Chinese name for this street, Zu Shi Gong Kou (祖师公口). It is known as Chor Su Kong Kau in Hokkien, which means "mouth of the Chor Su Kong Temple". This name is very likely due to Kim Lan Temple (金兰庙) which is dedicated to Qing Shui Zhu Shi (清水祖师), also known as Chor Su Kong (祖师公) in Hokkien. Kim Lan Temple was founded in 1830, and is currently under the management of Hokkien Huay Kuan. The temple was formerly located at Narcis Street and moved to Kim Tian Road in 1988. The former location of Kim Lan Temple at Narcis Street is actually very near Tras Street.
