= Seah (surname) =

- Pronunciation: /sia/, /ɕia/
- Language: Chinese (Southern Min), Muscogee, others?

Other names
- Alternative spelling: Chinese (成): Cheng, Shing; Chinese (佘): She, Chinese (謝): Xie, Tse, Chia; Muscogee: Sioh

Seah is a surname in various cultures. Its languages of origin include Chinese and Muscogee.

== Origins ==
Seah may be a Latin-alphabet spelling of multiple Chinese surnames, based on their pronunciation in various Southern Min dialects, listed in the table below. Southern Min spellings of Chinese surnames are often found in Malaysia and Singapore, where many descendants of Chinese migrants can trace their roots to the Fujian and Guangdong provinces of China where various Southern Min dialects are spoken.

Standard Mandarin	Character		Hokkien		Teochew		Notes	References
Hanyu Pinyin	T	S	Pe̍h-ōe-jī	IPA	Peng'im	IPA	Notes	References
Chéng	成		Siâⁿ	/ɕiã²⁴/	Sian^{5}	/sĩã⁵⁵/		
Shé	佘		Siâ	/ɕia/	Sia^{5}	/sia⁵⁵/		
Xiè	謝	谢	Siā	/ɕia³³/	Sia^{7}	/sia¹¹/	Literary pronunciation; the colloquial pronunciation is often spelled Chia	

Seah may also be name in other cultures as well. For example, it was a Muscogee name, more commonly spelled Sioh.

== Statistics ==
The 2010 United States census found 170 people with the surname Seah, making it the 105,079th-most-common name in the country. This represented an increase from 133 (120,330th-most-common) in the 2000 Census. In both censuses, more than eight-tenths of the bearers of the surname identified as Asian, and roughly one tenth as non-Hispanic White.

== People ==
=== Chinese surname Xiè (謝) ===
- Seah Mong Hee (谢门熙), Singaporean quantity surveyor who became a partner of Langdon & Seah in 1949
- Seah Kian Peng (谢健平; born 1961), Singaporean politician
- Jade Seah (谢美玉; born 1983), Singaporean model
- James Seah (谢俊峰; born 1990), Singaporean actor
- Stella Seah (谢慧娴; born 1992), Singaporean singer-songwriter

=== Chinese surname Shé (佘) ===
- Seah Eu Chin (佘有進; 1805–1883), Chinese-born Singaporean merchant
- Seah Tee Heng (佘泰兴; died 1884), Kapitan Cina in Johor, Malaya
- Seah Leng Chye (佘令财; fl. 1880s), son of Seah Tee Heng
- Seah Jim Quee (佘任桂; fl. 1890s), businessman in Johor, Malaya
- Seah Moon Ming (佘文民; born 1956), Singaporean corporate executive
- Lynnette Seah (佘美幸; born 1957), Singaporean violinist
- Seah Leong Peng (谢昂凭; 1966–2014), Malaysian politician
- Nicole Seah (佘雪玲; born 1986), Singaporean politician
- Charmaine Sheh (佘詩曼; born 1975), Hong Kong-Chinese actress and singer

=== Other ===
- Sunday Seah (born 1978), Liberian football goalkeeper
