= Hsieh =

Hsieh is the surname of:

- Audrey Hsieh (fl. 2014–present), American actress
- Chang-Tai Hsieh (born 1970), Taiwanese-born American economist
- Hsieh Che-ching (born 1973), Taiwanese cultural/art history expert, broadcaster, and travel writer
- Hsieh Cheng-peng (born 1991), Taiwanese tennis player, brother of Hsieh Su-wei and Hsieh Yu-chieh
- Hsieh Chia-han (born 1988), Taiwanese pole vaulter
- Hsieh Chien-ho (born 1987), Taiwanese long-distance runner
- Hsieh Chin-sheng (born 1963), Taiwanese golfer
- Hsieh Chi-ta (born 1949), Taiwanese lawyer and former politician
- Hsieh Chun-hui (1939–2002), Taiwanese politician
- David Hsieh (born 1953), Hong Kong-born American economist and professor
- Hsieh Fa-dah (born 1950), Taiwanese government official and diplomat
- Hsieh Fen-fen (born c. 1950), Taiwanese retired police officer
- Frank Hsieh (born 1946), Taiwanese politician, diplomat, and former defense attorney
- Frederic Hsieh (1945–1999), Chinese-born American realtor and investor who "founded" the first Chinese American suburban community, Monterey Park, California
- Hsieh or Xue Fucheng (1838–1894), Chinese diplomat
- George Hsieh (born 1975), Taiwanese politician
- Hsieh Guan-chiao (1811–1864), Chinese artist
- Henry Hsieh, Chinese-born American chemist
- Xie Xide (1921–2000), also known as Hsi-teh Hsieh and Hilda Hsieh, Chinese physicist
- Hsieh Ho-hsien (born 1987), Taiwanese singer and actor
- Hsieh Hsin-ying (born 1985), Taiwanese actress and model
- Hsieh Ing-dan (born 1949), Taiwanese police officer, former director‑general of the National Police Agency
- Janet Hsieh (born 1980), Taiwanese-American television personality, model, and violinist
- Jeannie Hsieh (born 1974), Taiwanese singer-songwriter, dancer, actress, and model
- Jenny Hsieh, American cell biologist and professor
- Kaylin Hsieh (born 2001), Hong Kong fencer
- Ke-Chiang Hsieh, Chinese-born astrophysicist
- Kelly Hsieh, Taiwanese politician and diplomat
- Hsieh or Tse Ling-ling (born 1956), Taiwanese child star
- Lingo Hsieh (born 1985), Taiwanese director and screenwriter
- Louis Hsieh (born c. 1965), Chinese businessman and lawyer
- Hsieh Min-Nan (born 1940), Taiwanese golfer
- Ming Hsieh (born 1956), Chinese-born American entrepreneur and philanthropist
- Hsieh Ming-yu (born 1969), Taiwanese singer-songwriter
- Hsieh Ming-yuan (born 1952), Taiwanese politician
- Or Hsieh (1918–1995), Taiwanese physician, educator, and politician, first Taiwanese female surgeon
- Hsieh Pei-chen (born 1988), Taiwanese badminton player
- Hsieh Pei-shan (born 1997), Taiwanese badminton player
- Roger Hsieh (1934–2019), Taiwanese politician and lawyer
- Hsieh Sam-chung (1919–2004), Taiwanese economist and Governor of the Central Bank of the Republic of China
- Samuel Hsieh (born 1978), Hong Kong touring car racing driver
- Hsieh Shen-shan (born 1939), Taiwanese politician
- Hsieh Shih-chien (1952–2025), Taiwanese airline executive
- Hsieh Shou-shing (born 1950), Taiwanese nuclear engineer
- Hsieh Shu-tzu (born 1981), Taiwanese former swimmer
- Hsieh Su-wei (born 1986), Taiwanese tennis player, sister of Hsieh Cheng-peng and Hsieh Yu-chieh
- Tehching Hsieh (born 1950), Taiwanese-born American painter and performance artist
- Tom Hsieh (1931–2023), Chinese-born American politician, architect, and vineyard owner
- Tony Hsieh (1973–2020), American Internet entrepreneur and venture capitalist
- Hsieh Tung-min (1908–2001), Taiwanese politician
- Hsieh Wen-cheng, Taiwanese businessman, diplomat, and politician in office from 2005 to 2008
- Hsieh or Xie Xuehong (1901–1970), Taiwanese revolutionary and politician
- Hsieh Yi-fong (born 1977), Taiwanese economist and politician
- Yin T. Hsieh (1929–2018), Taiwanese scientist and agronomist in the Dominican Republic
- Hsieh Ying-chun (born 1954), Taiwanese architect and contractor
- Hsieh Ying-xuan (born 1979), Taiwanese actress
- Hsieh Yu-chieh (born 1993), Taiwanese tennis and pickleball player, sister of Hsieh Su-Wei and Hsieh Cheng-peng
- Hsieh Yue-hsia (1944–2009), Taiwanese actress
- Hsieh Yu-hsing (born 1983), Taiwanese badminton player
- Hsieh Yu-Ming (1893–1986), Chinese physicist and educator
- Hsieh Yung-yo (born 1934), Taiwanese golfer
- Hsieh Yu-shu (born 1960), Taiwanese golfer
- Zach Hsieh (born 1999), American YouTuber

== See also ==
- Xie (surname)
