= She (surname) =

The Surname in Chinese Character

She (Chinese: 佘; pinyin: Shé; Wade–Giles: She^{2}; Vietnamese: Xà; Korean Hangul: 사; Japanese Hiragana: しゃ) is a Chinese family name. Additional romanizations include Siah, Seah, Sheh, Sia, and Sher.

She was listed at the 546th place in the Hundred Family Surnames.

She has a historical connection to Yú (余).

== Origins ==
According to chronicles, the Yu Clan are descendant of Yu the Great (大禹)'s third son Han (罕). Yu's wife was Tu San Nyu (涂山女) who gave birth to three sons. Oldest son Qi (启), second son Su (窣) and youngest was Han (罕). Han was bestow the Tu (涂) region, and given the title of King Qin of Yu (余庆王), thus he and descendant uses the state Yu as surname. Yu (余) is derived from Tu (涂), removing the stroke on the left which represent water.

== Ancestor of She ==
She Clan Ancestor, She Feng (佘諷) or She Wan (佘顽)

- She Feng (佘諷), She I (1st)
- She Qin (佘钦), She XXII (22nd)

=== She Feng ===
During the regime of Emperor Huai of Jin in 307 AD, the Yu Clan (余) due to Shi Le's Rebellion (石勒之乱) sought refuge in Muzhou (睦州) which is in current day Zhejiang (浙江). During the reign of Emperor Ming of Jin in 323 AD, Yu Feng (余諷) became an official of the Jin dynasty, and in order to avoid a taboo, he changed his surname from Yu (余) to She (佘). From that point on he was known as She Feng (佘諷). So because of this, his descendants followed to have this new surname. She Wan/ She Feng became the Grand Ancestor of the She Clan. Most chronicles still recognize him as She Feng (佘諷).

=== She Qin ===
She Qin (佘钦) was the first to appear in the Chinese national history. She Qin, whose courtesy name was Zheng Guo (正国), attained Jin Shi (进士) degree. In Tang dynasty's Kai Yuan (开元) era in 740 AD, he became the Ji Xue Yuan (集贤院) Grand Scholar, which is a title in the imperial court. He was born in Jiangxi Nanchang. Once the Emperor Xuanzong of Tang bestow him to take care of a commandery in Nanchang (南昌), thus moving his home to Anhui. She Qin has four son.

- 1st Son, She Rong Hua (佘荣华): Became Zhong Shu She Ren (重书舍人), which is a title in the imperial court, his descendant arrived in Jiangxi
- 2nd Son, She Ming (佘明): Descendant arrived in Fujian Putian (莆田) province, Guangdong Shunde (顺德) province.
- 3rd Son, She Yuan (佘院): Courtesy name was Jin Zhan (景瞻), descendant arrived in Guangdong Chaozhou province.
- 4th Son, She Ge (佘阁): No chronicles.

== Guangdong, Chaozhou ==
She Clan descendants in Chaozhou has two group, first group come from Anhui, She Shou Zi (佘守之) during Liu Song dynasty was an official as Chong Zhen Lang (从政郎), during that period there was successive years of war, Song dynasty moved the capital southwards, thus She Shou Zi himself moved his family to Guangdong Chaozhou. His great-great-grandson She Kuan Da (佘宽大), become a young official. His descendants settled down in Chaozhou's Yue Pu (月浦), Yu Zhou (渔州), Feng Xi (枫溪), Yang Shan (羊山), Tang Kou (塘口) and the other She Clan settlement. Till early part of Ming dynasty, She of Yue Pu (月浦佘) in Yu Zhou, has some descendants moved to Hai Yang (海阳), Chenghai District.

The second group during Ming dynasty Wang Li (万历) era (circa 1573–1620 AD), She Dan Zai (佘淡斋) moved from Fujian Putian (莆田) province to Chenghai District (澄海县).

=== Grand Ancestor in Chaozhou ===
Chaozhou She Clan recognize She Feng(佘諷), thus making him the Grand Ancestor.

- She Shou Zi (佘守之), She XXIX (29th)
- She Lu Sheng (佘辂生), She XXX (30th)
- She Gong Yu (佘公育), She XXXI (31st)
- She Kuan Da (佘宽大), She XXXII (32nd)

==== She Shou Zi ====
She Shou Zi (佘守之) was She Yuan (佘院)'s descendant, was Song dynasty official as Chong Zhen Lang (从政郎), later move from Anhui to Guangdong Chaozhou. Which means She Clan have arrived in Chaozhou since Song dynasty. He has three sons.

- 2nd Son, She Lu Sheng (佘辂生)

==== She Lu Sheng ====
She Shou Zi's (佘守之) 2nd son, has four sons.

- 3rd Son, She Gong Yu (佘公育)

==== She Gong Yu ====
She Gong Yu (佘公育) is She Shou Zi's great-grandson, pseudonym was Nan Chang (南昌), he has three sons.

- 1st Son, She Guang Da (佘光大)
- 2nd Son, She Ming Da (佘名大)
- 3rd Son, She Kuan Da (佘宽大)

==== She Kuan Da ====
She Kuan Da (佘宽大), courtesy name was Yue Liang (曰量), born in Southern Song dynasty Emperor Duzong of Song time, third year of Xian Chun (咸淳) era which is 1267 AD, and live until Emperor Renzong of Yuan third year of Yan You (延佑) rra which is 1316 AD. He was an official in the royal court as Chao Feng Lang (朝奉郎) (recorded in Book Five of the Jie Yang County Chronicles). He was later promoted to Pi Chao Feng Dai Fu (辟朝奉大夫), as he settled down in Chaozhou Tao Shan (桃山), thus the descendants recognize him as Grand Ancestor in Chaozhou. He was buried behind Tao Shan Cen Zai Village (桃山岑仔村), and the tomb is currently still standing, the tomb was re-embellish in 1988 AD. He has two sons, each developing their homes in the region, their descendants has populated from Chaoshan region to Southeast Asia, his wife Tian Jing (恬静) of Ni Clan (倪氏) give birth to Bo Feng (柏峰), in Yuan dynasty Tai Ding (泰定) rra (1324–1328 AD) he move his home from Tao Shan (桃山) to Jie Yang (揭阳). As the village has a round lake like a mirror, it was named as Round Mirror Village (圆镜村). Later as the village was near Han River (韩江) and surrounded by small streams, the residents built their home along the streams, like a new moon, thus giving it a name of Yu Pu Township (月浦乡).

Currently in Chaoshan region's She Clan recognize him as Grand Ancestor in Chaozhou, instead of She Shou Zi (佘守之).

== Prominent people ==
=== Pre-modern ===
- She Qin (佘钦) – Tang dynasty Taixue professor
- She Saihua (佘赛花) – She Taijun (佘太君): Song dynasty, General Yang Ye's wife
- She Xiu Mei (佘修梅) – Qing dynasty official
- She Zhi Zhen (佘志贞) – Qing dynasty official, Jin Shi (进士) degree
- Seah Eu Chin (佘有进) – founder of Ngee Ann Kongsi and leader of Teochew clan in Singapore; he was also made a Justice of the Peace and a member of the Grand Jury
- She Hui (佘惠) – communist revolutionary martyr in PRC

=== Modern ===
- Charmaine Sheh (佘詩曼; born 1975), Hong Kong actress
- Lynnette Seah (佘美幸; born 1957), Singaporean violinist
- Nicole Seah (佘雪玲; born 1986), Singaporean politician
- Peter Seah Lim Huat (佘林发; born 1947), Singaporean business executive
- Seah Jim Quee (佘任桂), Malayan contractor
- Seah Leng Chye (佘令财), Malaysian landowner
- Seah Moon Ming (佘文民; born 1956), Singaporean corporate executive, and CEO of SMRT Corporation
- Seah Tee Heng (佘泰興; died 1884), Malaysian politician
- She Qiutong (佘秋彤; born 1993), Chinese curler
- She Zhijiang (佘智江; born 1982), Chinese Cambodian businessman
- She Fuqiang (佘福强; born 1958), Chinese Indonesian/Singaporean infamous businessman

== Other ==
- Sheshan and Sheshan Island in Shanghai
