= Chia (surname) =

- Pronunciation: Pronounced in English roughly as /t͡ʃia/ for Chinese surnames, and /kia/ for the Italian surname
- Language: Often Chinese, also sometimes Italian

Other names
- Variant forms: Jia, Kar (家, 賈); Jia (郟, 甲); Xie, Hsieh, Tse (謝); Che (車)

Chia is a surname. It is a Latin-alphabet spelling of various Chinese surnames, as well as an Italian surname.

== Statistics ==
Chia was the 20th-most common Chinese surname in Singapore as of 1997 (ranked by English spelling, rather than by Chinese characters). Roughly 22,600 people, or 0.9% of the Chinese Singaporean population at the time, bore the surname Chia. Among respondents to the 2000 United States census, Chia was the 856th-most common surname among Asian Pacific Americans, and 17,530th-most common overall, with 1,481 bearers (72.78% of whom identified as Asian/Pacific Islander). In Italy, 72 families bore the surname Chia, with more than half located in Sardinia.

== Origins ==
Chia may be a spelling of a number of Chinese surnames, based on different varieties of Chinese, listed below by their romanisation in Mandarin pinyin:

- Jia (various characters and tones), all spelled Chia in the Wade–Giles romanisation of Mandarin used before the development of pinyin, and still widespread in Taiwan.
  - Jiā (家; IPA: /t͡ɕia⁵⁵/)
  - Jiá (郟; IPA: /t͡ɕia³⁵/), which originated as a toponymic surname.
  - Jiǎ (賈; IPA: /t͡ɕia²¹⁴/), which also originated as a toponymic surname referring to the State of Jia, one of the ancient Chinese states, a feudal territory granted to a son of Shu Yu of Tang, located in modern-day Linfen, Shanxi.
  - Jiǎ (甲; IPA: /t͡ɕia²¹⁴/), which originated as a shortening of an ancient toponymic surname Jiǎfù (甲父).
- Xiè (謝), spelled Chia based on its pronunciation in various Southern Min dialects, including:
  - Hokkien (Pe̍h-ōe-jī: Chiā; IPA: /t͡ɕia³³/)
  - Teochew (Peng'im: Zia^{7}; IPA: /t͡sia¹¹/)
- Chē (車), spelled Chia based on its pronunciation in various Southern Min dialects, including:
  - Hokkien (POJ: Chhia, IPA: /t͡ɕʰia⁴⁴/)
  - Teochew (Peng'im: Cia^{1}; IPA: /t͡sʰia³³/)

It is also an Italian toponymic surname referring to Chia, Province of South Sardinia. That toponym may have originated from a Phoenician word for "valley".

== Chinese surname 谢 ==
- Chia Boon Leong (谢文龙; 1925–2022), Singaporean footballer
- Eric Chia (谢英福; 1930s–2008), Malaysian businessman
- Nicholas Chia (谢益裕; 1938–2024), third Roman Catholic Archbishop of Singapore
- Chia Thye Poh (谢太宝; born 1941), Singaporean political activist imprisoned for 23 years without charge or trial
- Mantak Chia (謝明德; born 1944), Thai Taoist master
- Yvonne Chia (谢姚依雯; born c. 1953), Malaysian banker
- Chia Yong Yong (谢邕邕; born 1962), Singaporean lawyer and politician
- Steve Chia (谢镜丰; born 1970), Singaporean politician
- Danny Chia (谢志荣; born 1972), Malaysian golfer
- Michelle Chia (谢韵仪; born 1975), Singaporean actress
- Elvin Chia (谢俊道; born 1977), Malaysian swimmer
- Amber Chia (谢丽萍; born 1981), Malaysian model and actress
- Wen Shin Chia (谢雯欣; born c. 1991), Malaysian environmentalist
- Kimberly Chia (谢静仪; born 1995), Singaporean actress
- Aaron Chia (谢定峰; born 1997), Malaysian badminton player
- Nelson Chia (谢燊杰), Singaporean television actor and director

== Chinese surname 賈 ==
- Chia Ching-teh (賈景德; 1880–1960), Republic of China politician
- Chia Lien-chen (賈連仁; 1912–?), Chinese middle-distance runner
- Pei-yuan Chia (賈培源; born 1939), Hong Kong-born American banker
- Alyssa Chia (賈靜雯; born 1974), Taiwanese actress
- Chih-Ta Chia (賈至達), Taiwanese physicist
- Wenlan Chia (賈雯蘭), Taipei-born American fashion designer

== Other or unknown ==
People with a non-Chinese surname Chia, or whose names as written in Chinese characters are not available:

- Chia Chungchang (fl. 1948), Chinese basketball player
- Víctor Li-Carrillo Chía (1929–1988), Peruvian philosopher
- Cheng Sait Chia (1940–1981), Singaporean-born Canadian poet
- Sandro Chia (born 1946), Italian painter and sculptor
- Beatrice Chia (born 1974), Singaporean actress
- Gec Chia (born 1979), Filipino businessman and former basketball player
- Daphne Chia (born 1996), Singaporean gymnast
- Luis Carlos Chía (born 1997), Colombian cyclist
- Grace Chia, Singaporean writer

== See also ==
- Chica (name)
- Chika (general name)
