= Xie (surname) =

Xie / Hsieh
- Pronunciation: Xiè (Pinyin); Siā and Chiā (Pe̍h-ōe-jī); Siā and Tsiā (Tâi-lô)
- Language: Chinese, Vietnamese, Korean

Origin
- Language: Chinese
- Origin: Descendants of Yuyang
- Derivation: State of Xie
- Meaning: to thank

Other names
- Variant forms: Xie, Hsieh (Mandarin); Tse, Tze, Che, Jay, Der (Cantonese); Chia, Cheah, Sia (Hokkien); Chia, Shia (Teochew); Zhia, Zia (Shanghainese); Sa (Korean); Tạ (Vietnamese); Suryajaya/Soeryadjaya, Cahyadi, Cahyono, Ciawi (Indonesian); Chea (Cambodian)

Xie ([ɕjê]; simplified Chinese: 谢; traditional Chinese: 謝; pinyin: Xiè; Wade–Giles: Hsieh^{⁴}) is a Chinese surname. It is usually romanized as Hsieh in Taiwan. It is estimated that there are more than ten million people around the world, mostly of Chinese descent, with this surname, most of whom live in Taiwan, Southern China, South East Asia, and North America. It is particularly common in Taiwan where it is the 13th most common surname in 2016.

It is also very common in the East Asian diaspora which historically tended to have disproportionately emigrated out of southern China. A 2013 study found that Xie was the 23rd most common surname in China, with 0.79% of the population having this surname. In 2019 it was again the 23rd most common surname in mainland China. Most Xie are from southern China. It is the 34th name on the Hundred Family Surnames poem.

The surname originated in two major branches: during the Three Sovereigns and Five Emperors period, and near the end of the Western Zhou dynasty. It was a prominent aristocratic clan in the Eastern Jin dynasty of China. The hometown of the Xie is Kaifeng, Henan Province.

== Variations ==
The spelling of the same Chinese character using Wade–Giles romanization is Hsieh. The spelling "Hsieh" is most commonly used in Taiwan and in older romanizations, particularly by older generations of the Chinese and Taiwanese diaspora, for instance in the United States. "Hsieh" has been often phonologically adapted to /ˈʃeɪ/ "Shay" in English-speaking society, for instance in the United States, as a result of anglicisation. Other variations are pronounced "Sh'eh" and the spelling is sometimes modified to Shieh.

The Cantonese spelling of the same Chinese character is Tse or Tze and the Taishanese spelling of the same Chinese character is Dea, Der, Dare, or Dear. The Teochew and Hokkien spelling of the same Chinese character are Chia, Shia, Cheah, or Sia.

In Malaysia and Singapore, the name is most commonly Chia, although Cheah, Seah, Sia, Shia, Cha, Tse, Chay, etc. can also be found. During the Chinese diaspora, the region was administered by British Empire clerks, who knew little about Chinese dialects, often had to find their own romanizations. As a result, the variations are non-exhaustive.

In the Philippines, the name is also spelled as Sese (which also means thank you in Kapampangan, the language in Pampanga, where the first Xie settled), which is also a variation in the rest of the ASEAN region, Taiwan, and South Korea. In Indonesia, the name is also spelt as Tjhia or Tjia. In East Timor, as a legacy of Portuguese colonialism and lingua franca, Xie is also produced as Tchia, Tchea, Tsia, Tcha, and Tjea. The Vietnamese version is Tạ.

In the United States, the name is sometimes spelled as Jair and Zia. Other variations of the surname include Shea and Shei.

=== Variation table ===
Variation	Language	Common Place
Xie	Mandarin/Pinyin Romanization	Mainland China
Tse	Cantonese	Hong Kong
Chay Cheah; Chia; Seah; Sia; Shia	Hokkien (Minnan) and Teochew Cantonese	Min Overseas Chinese
Tjhia; Tjia	Bahasa Indonesia	Indonesia
Cheah; Chia; Seah	All Min, Hakka and Yue dialects	Malaysia, Singapore
Cha	Hakka	Jamaica
Sia	Chinese Filipino (Hokkien)	Philippines
Sieh	Chinese Filipino (Mandarin)	Philippines
Choa; Chua	Chinese Filipino (Cantonese)	Philippines
Sese	Chinese Mestizos from Pampanga	Philippines
Hsieh; Shieh	Wade–Giles romanization (Mandarin)	Taiwan
Siā; Tsiā	Taiwanese Hokkien	Taiwan
Ché	Portuguese	Macau
Tcha; Tchea; Tchia; Tjea; Tsia	Portuguese	Timor-Leste
Dea; Dear; Dare; Der	Taishanese	United States
Zia; Zhia	Shanghainese	United States
Tạ	Chinese Vietnamese, Vietnamese	Vietnam
Sa	Korean	Korea
Siek; Seak; Chea	Cambodian	Cambodia
Sha	Japanese	Japan

== Origins and history ==
During the legendary Three Sovereigns and Five Emperors period, the Xie were believed to be the descendants of Yuyang, son of the Yellow Emperor. Yuyang's descendants founded ten states successively, the State of Xie (谢) first, and its occupants becoming the first Xie.

For the purpose of reciprocating his mother's upbringing, King Xuan of Zhou (r. 827 – 782 BCE) of the Western Zhou dynasty granted the former State of Xie, in modern Nanyang, Henan province, to his maternal uncle Shen Boxi, the Marquess of Shen, whose line claimed descent from the semi-mythological character Bo Yi. The people of Xie later adopted the name of the state as their surname.

In the Eastern Jin dynasty, the Xie were among the cluster of noble clans who fled to the south in the wake of the fall of Chang'an, dominating the court thereafter. The legend has it that it derived from Yellow Emperor Tribe: almost vanished in “Xia, Shang, Zhou” dynasty. The legend has it that it derived from Ren Clan in Xie State, descendant of Yellow Emperor, It takes the State name as Clan. Its land was manor of Shen Bo until the Zhou dynasty got perished, the descendant of Shen Bo took the State name as Clan. Derived from Yan Emperor Tribe: the Ancestor Shen Bo is generally acknowledged by contemporary Xie Clan. Derived from Jiang Clan, came from the inherited manor Xie for the descendant of Yan Emperor and Shen Bo, it takes the State name as Clan. The royal descendant of State Shen who takes the place name as Clan, called Xie Clan, its so-called Henan Xie Clan, known as Xie Clan Orthodox in history. Most of the contemporary Xie Clan people respects Shen Bo as the first ancestor. Changed into Zhile Clan.

The litterateur Xie Yan in the late Sui dynasty and early Tang dynasty (?–643), changed Xie into Zhi Le, his grandfather Xiao Zheng was emperor's regular attendant of horse riding, restored to Xie after the Sui dynasty.

The compound surname of Xieqiu, derived from Ji Clan, came from the manor Xie Shui which was granted by King Xuan for his concubine, it takes the densely populated place as the Clan. In the Western Zhou dynasty, the King Xuan of Ji Jing once granted his concubine with Xie Shui waterfront in the South-West of Luoyang. After the King Ping of Ji Yijiu transferred to Luoyang, these clan people also moved to Gongqiu (old Yunzhou, present-day Ningyang, Shandong). In memory of the old house, the concubine's son for King Xuan also call the newly granted Gongqiu as Xie Qiu, after that, some Clan people take the densely populated place Xie Qiu as Clan, called Xie Qiu Clan, there was Xie Qiu Zhang at Lu State in the Spring and Autumn period.

== Famous people with the surname Xie ==
=== Xie clan of Chen commandery ===
- Xie An (謝安) (320–385), statesman and prime minister of the Jin dynasty
- Xie Daoyun (謝道韫) (340–399), Jin dynasty scholar, poet and debater
- Xie Xuan (謝玄) (343–388), Duke of Kangle, Jin dynasty general
- Xie Lingyun (謝靈運) (385–433), Duke of Kangle, Jin dynasty poet
- Empress Xie Fanjing (謝梵境), Empress of the Liu Song dynasty
- Xie He (謝赫), Liu Song and Southern Qi writer, art historian and critic.

=== Politics and military ===
- Frank Hsieh (謝長廷), former Kaohsiung mayor, Premier of Taiwan, and DPP's candidate for the 2008 ROC presidency
- Hsieh Fa-dah (謝發達) (born 1950), Vice Minister of Economic Affairs of the Republic of China (2006–2008)
- Hsieh Shou-shing (謝曉星) (born 1950), Minister of Atomic Energy Council of the Republic of China
- Hsieh Tung-min (謝東閔) (1908–2001), Kuomintang politician and first native of Taiwan to become Vice-President of the Republic of China (Taiwan)
- Xie Fei (謝飛) (1913–2013), Chinese revolutionary, participant in the Long March and third wife of Liu Shaoqi
- Xie Fuzhi (谢富治) (1909–1972), Chinese Communist Party military commander and political commissar
- Xie Jinyuan (謝晉元), Commander of the Defense of Sihang Warehouse in the National Revolutionary Army of China during the Second Sino-Japanese War
- You Xie (謝盛友), CSU-political leader, German journalist and author of Chinese origin
- Xie Jianshun, Taiwanese intersex soldier
- Helen Zia, Asian-American journalist and activist
- Chia Yong Yong (谢邕邕), Singaporean lawyer and Member of Parliament
- Chia Thye Poh (谢太宝), Singaporean politician and former political prisoner
- Steve Chia (谢镜丰) (born 1970), Singaporean politician
- Seah Kian Peng (謝健平) (born 1961), Singaporean unionist and Speaker of the Parliament of Singapore

=== Criminals ===
- Chia Teck Leng, Singaporean white-collar criminal
- Chia Kee Chen, Singaporean murderer

=== Entertainment and business ===
- Xie Jin (谢晋) (1923–2008), film director
- Tse Kwan Ho, (謝君豪) Actor of film, stage, and television
- Xie Na, (谢娜) Host, singer, actress
- Michael Tse (謝天華), Hong Kong actor
- Ming Hsieh (謝明), billionaire & founder of Cogent Systems and Fulgent Genetics, namesake of University of Southern California's Ming Hsieh Department of Electrical Engineering
- Nicholas Tse (謝霆鋒), Hong Kong–based singer and actor
- Patrick Tse (謝賢), actor, producer, screenwriter and director in Hong Kong cinema.
- Kenneth Tse (謝德骥), classical saxophone soloist
- Kay Tse (謝安琪), Hong Kong singer
- Xie Shaoguang (谢韶光) (born 1961), Singapore television actor
- Fiona Xie (谢宛谕) (born 1982), Singaporean television actress
- Amber Chia (谢麗萍) (born 1981), Malaysian model
- Beau Sia (謝福源), Chinese-American slam poet.
- Tony Hsieh (謝家華), Zappos.com CEO
- Jeffrey Cheah (謝富年), Founder and chairman of The Sunway Group of Companies in Malaysia.
- Dhanin Chearavanont (谢国民), CEO of CP Group
- William Soeryadjaya (謝建隆), co-founder of Astra International
- Jeannie Hsieh, Taiwanese singer-songwriter, dancer, actress, and model
- Janet Hsieh, Taiwanese American television host
- Jade Seah (谢美玉) (born 1983), Singaporean model and actress
- Nelson Chia (谢燊杰), Singaporean theater director
- Yvonne Chia (谢姚依雯) (born 1953), Malaysian CEO
- Eric Chia (谢英福), Malaysian businessman
- Kimberly Chia (谢静仪) (born 1995), Singaporean actress
- Michelle Chia (谢韵仪) (born 1975), Singaporean actress
- Xie Tian (谢添), Chinese actor and director

=== Literature and art ===
- Xie Jin (謝縉) (1369–1415), Ming dynasty landscape painter and calligrapher
- Dr. Cheah Thien Soong, Malaysian contemporary ink-painting artist
- Xie Jun (谢军) (born 1970), two-time Women's World Chess Champion
- Xie Zhe-Qing (謝哲青) (born 1973), Taiwanese literature and history scholar, travel writer
- Helen Zia - author, activist, journalist & writer
- Chris Tse (New Zealand writer) (born 1982), New Zealand poet, short story writer and editor
- Chris Tse (Canadian poet) (born 1989), Canadian spoken-word poet, motivational speaker, and hip hop artist

=== Sports ===
- Xie Limei (谢荔梅), Chinese triple jumper
- Xie Peiling (born 2010), Chinese diver
- Xie Siyi (谢思埸), diver from the People's Republic of China
- Xie Xingfang (谢杏芳), badminton player from the People's Republic of China
- Xie Zhongbo (谢中博), badminton player from the People's Republic of China
- Cheah Soon Kit (谢順吉) (born 1968), badminton player from Malaysia. 1986 Badminton Olympic Silver medalist
- Cheah Liek Hou, para-badminton player from Malaysia. 2020 Para-Badminton Paralympic Gold medalist.
- Aaron Chia (谢定峰) (born 1997), badminton player from Malaysia.
- Hsieh Chia-hsien (謝佳賢), professional baseball player from Taiwan.
- Hsieh Su-wei, professional tennis player from Taiwan.
- Hsieh Chia-Han (born 1988), pole vaulter from Taiwan.
- Chia Boon Leong (谢文龙) (1925–2022), Singaporean-Chinese footballer

=== Religion ===
- Xie Shiguang (1917–2005), Chinese Catholic bishop
- Nicholas Chia (谢益裕), Roman Catholic Archbishop of Singapore
- Mantak Chia (謝明德), Thai taoist master
- Matthias Der (謝子和), current Bishop of Hong Kong Island

=== Education ===
- Shiuhpyng Shieh, National Chiao Tung University, Taiwan and Editor-in-Chief of IEEE Transactions on Reliability
- Daniel Tse, University of Macau
- T.H. Tse, The University of Hong Kong
- Shieh You-hwa
- David Tse, Stanford University
- Shang-Ping Xie, climatologist
- Daniel Tse, University of Macau
- Xie Xide (谢希德) (1921–2000), Chinese physicist and President of Fudan University (1983–1989), the first woman to lead a university in the PRC

== See also ==
- Chea
