= Chea =

- Pronunciation: Khmer: [ciə]; Korean: [t͡ɕʰe̞]

Origin
- Word/name: Cambodia, Korea

Chea is a surname in various cultures.

== Origins ==
Chea may be a Cambodian surname (Khmer: ជា; IPA: [ciə]). That surname is derived from the Chinese surname Xiè (traditional Chinese: 謝; simplified Chinese: 谢), specifically Southern Min pronunciations of that surname, e.g. Hokkien Chinese (Pe̍h-ōe-jī: Chia^{7}, Sia^{7}). Other spellings derived from Southern Min pronunciations of that Chinese surname include Chia and Cheah.

Chea may also be an alternative spelling of the Korean surname more commonly romanised as Chae (Korean: 채; Hanja: 蔡, 菜, 采; IPA: [t͡ɕʰe̞]).

== Statistics ==
French government statistics show 161 people with the surname Chea born in France from 1991 to 2000, 230 from 1981 to 1990, 45 from 1971 to 1980, five from 1961 to 1970, and none in earlier time periods.

The 2000 South Korean Census found 119,251 people with the family name usually romanised as Chae. This surname is only rarely spelled as Chea; in a study based on year 2007 applications for South Korean passports, 87.8% of the applicants chose to spell this surname as Chae, and 7.5% as Chai, as compared to only 1.7% who chose the spelling Chea.

The 2010 United States census found 4,492 people with the surname Chea, making it the 7,411th-most-common name in the country. This represented an increase from 3,404 (8,850th-most-common) in the 2000 Census. In both censuses, slightly more than four-fifths of the bearers of the surname identified as Asian, while the proportion of bearers who identified as black increased from 4.9% in the 2000 Census to 6.3% in the 2010 Census. Chea was the 359th-most-common surname among respondents to the 2000 Census who identified as Asian.

== People ==
Cambodian surname Chea (ជា):

- Chea Soth (1928–2012), Cambodian politician, MP for Prey Veng Province
- Chea Sim (1932–2015), Cambodian politician, President of the National Assembly (1981–1998)
- Veasna Chea Leth (born 1944), Cambodian lawyer
- Chea Vannath (born 1948), Cambodian anti-corruption activist and translator
- Chea Sophara (born 1953), Cambodian politician, Minister of Rural Development (2008–2016)
- Chea Vichea (1968–2004), Cambodian trade unionist
- Chea Poch (born 1974), Cambodian politician, MP for Prey Veng Province
- Chea Serey (born 1981), Cambodian economist
- Chea Samnang (born 1994), Cambodian football midfielder

Other:

- José Luis Chea Urruela (fl. 1960s–present), Guatemalan politician
- Alvin Chea (born 1967), American gospel singer
- Chea Song-joo (born 1998), South Korean figure skater
- Leanna Chea, French actress

== See also ==
- Chea Waters Evans, American politician from Vermont
- Chea Cheapoo (born 1942), Liberian judge
- Nuon Chea (born Lau Kim Korn, 1926–2019), Cambodian war criminal and deputy to Pol Pot
