= Hedge fund replication =

Hedge fund replication is the collective name given to a number of different methods that attempt to replicate hedge fund returns. The hedge fund industry has boomed over recent years and various studies by investment banks as well as academic papers have shown that hedge funds may be nearing an alpha generating capacity constraint. This means hedge funds can no longer produce alpha in aggregate. Replication has been claimed to remove the illiquidity, transparency and fraud risk associated with direct investment in hedge funds. With the belief that the pursuit of alpha is a zero-sum game, more investors are looking to simply add "Hedge Fund Beta" to their portfolio. These early investors have been rewarded as the replicators outperformed their direct investment cousins in 2008 due to their greater liquidity and lower use of leverage.

== Replication strategies ==
=== Mechanical replication ===
The most intuitive replication methodology essentially looks at each hedge fund strategy in isolation, and qualitatively asking the question: What is the manager trying to do to generate returns? For each hedge fund strategy, a replication strategy is put in place that attempts to mimic what the hedge fund manager is doing in a mechanical fashion. Consequently, one would expect to generate the beta, but not the alpha, of that particular strategy. This process is carried out for each of the hedge fund strategies, and then these strategies are combined to produce a product that attempts to replicate the entire hedge fund universe.

=== Trading strategy indices ===
An alternative to direct hedge fund replication has been the development of trading strategy indices, which for some financial institutions, came as a further development of the hedge fund replication business. Many trading strategy indices use similar investment styles to hedge funds, but aim to generate returns in their own right, rather than seeking to recreate the performances of the hedge fund industry. However, a diversified portfolio of trading strategy indices is viewed, and frequently marketed, as a liquid alternative to direct exposure to the hedge fund industry.

=== Factor replication ===
The factor replication method attempts to replicate the return stream of the hedge fund universe. The simplest way of doing this is by carrying out a linear regression, using one of the headline hedge fund indices and a number of factors. The model selects the factors that have the highest explanatory powers for the index returns, and then each month the model will perform the regression analysis over a rolling time frame, and select the weightings for each of these factors. This method is backward looking and may miss inflection points in the market as it relies on a rolling window of returns. Improvements to this method have been suggested, such as using Kalman or Particle filters, which improve the speed at which the model reacts to change.

=== Hedge Fund Research Index ===
A recent advancement of the replication community is the introduction of a benchmark index, called the Hedge Fund Research Index, published by hedgefundresearch.com. This index represents all the main product providers, and analysis of this index shows that around 85% of all hedge fund returns can be replicated. Furthermore, the remaining 15% of returns that may be classified as "alpha" is actually less than the fees associated with investing via a fund of hedge funds. The average fund of hedge funds should therefore statistically under perform the average replicator. The Hedge Fund Research Index has a correlation of 0.93 to the broader hedge fund indices (as represented by the HFR Composite Index).

== Future of hedge funds ==
In time, if hedge fund alpha continues to diminish, an exposure to hedge fund beta via hedge fund replication is likely to become the core holding of an investor's hedge fund allocation, with investments in individual hedge funds being seen as satellite holdings. This will mirror the growth in index-tracking mutual funds and ETFs in the long only world.

== See also ==
- Alternative beta
- Trading Strategy Index
