= Alternative beta =

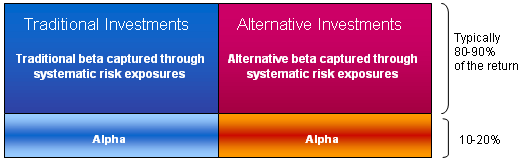
In traditional investments, the volatile (beta) investments are managed to balance risk and return. For alternative investments, this management is called "alternative beta".

Alternative beta is the concept of managing volatile "alternative investments", often through the use of hedge funds. Alternative beta is often also referred to as "alternative risk premia".

Researcher Lars Jaeger says that the return from an investment mainly results from exposure to systematic risk factors. These exposures can take two basic forms: long only "buy and hold" exposures and exposures through the use of alternative investment techniques such as long/short investing, the use of derivatives (non-linear payout profiles), or the employment of leverage)

== Background ==
=== Alternative investments ===
Although alternative investment is a general term, (commonly defined as any investment other than stocks, bonds or cash), alternative beta relates to the use of hedge funds. At its most basic, a hedge fund is an investment vehicle that pools capital from a number of investors and invests in securities and other instruments. It is administered by a professional management firm, and often structured as a limited partnership, limited liability company, or similar vehicle.

=== Volatility ("beta") ===
For an investment that involves risk to be worthwhile, its returns must be higher than a risk-free investment. The risk is related to volatility.

A measure of the factors influencing an investment's volatility is the beta. The beta is a measure of the risk arising from exposure to general market movements as opposed to idiosyncratic factors.

A beta below 1 can indicate either an investment with lower volatility than the market, or a volatile investment whose price movements are not highly correlated with the market. An example of the first is a treasury bill: the price does not go up or down a lot, so it has a low beta. An example of the second is gold. The price of gold does go up and down a lot, but not in the same direction or at the same time as the market.

A beta above 1 generally means that the asset both is volatile and tends to move up and down with the market. An example is a stock in a big technology company. Negative betas are possible for investments that tend to go down when the market goes up, and vice versa. There are few fundamental investments with consistent and significant negative betas, but some derivatives like equity put options can have large negative beta values.

Investments with a high beta value are often called "beta investments", as opposed to "alpha investments" which typically have lower volatility and lower returns.

== Volatility and hedge funds ==
Separating returns into alpha and beta can also be applied to determine the amount and type of fees to charge. The consensus is to charge higher fees for alpha (incl. performance fee), since it is mostly viewed as skill based. The topic has received increasing levels of attention due to the very rapid growth of the hedge fund industry, where investment companies typically charge fees higher than those of mutual funds, based on the assumption that hedge funds are alpha investments. Investors have started to question whether hedge funds are actually alpha investments, or just some "new" form of beta (i.e. alternative beta).

This issue was raised in the 1997 paper "Empirical Characteristics of Dynamic Trading Strategies: The Case of Hedge Funds" by William Fung and David Hsieh. Following this paper, several groups of academics (such as Thomas Schneeweis et al.) started to explain past hedge fund returns using various systematic risk factors (i.e. Alternative Betas). Following this, a paper has discussed whether investable strategies based on such factors can not only explain past returns, but also replicate future ones.

== Different betas based on different investment exposures ==
Traditional betas can be seen as those related to investments the common investor would already be experienced with (examples include stocks and most bonds). They are typically represented through indexation, and the techniques employed here are what is called "long only". The definition of alternative beta in contrast requires the consideration of other investment techniques such as short selling, use of derivatives and leverage - techniques which are often associated with the activities of hedge funds. The underlying non-traditional investment risks are often seen as being riskier, as investors are less familiar with them.

== Alpha and investments and beta investments ==
Viewed from the implementation side, investment techniques and strategies are the means to either capture risk premia (beta) or to obtain excess returns (alpha). Whereas returns from beta are a result of exposing the portfolio to systematic risks (traditional or alternative), alpha is an exceptional return that an investor or portfolio manager earns due to his unique skill, i.e. exploiting market inefficiencies. Academic studies as well as their performance in recent years strongly support the idea that the return from hedge funds mostly consists of (alternative) risk premia. This is the basis of the various approaches to replicate the return profile of hedge funds by direct exposures to alternative beta (hedge fund replication).

== Hedge fund replication ==
There are currently two main approaches to replicate the return profile of hedge funds based on the idea of Alternative Betas:

1. directly extracting the risk premia (bottom up), an approach developed and advocated by Lars Jaeger
2. the factor-based approach based on Sharpe's factor models and developed for hedge funds first by professors Bill Fung (London Business School), David Hsieh (Fuqua School of Business, Duke University) et al.

== See also ==
- Hedge fund replication
- Trading Strategy Index
