= Immigration to Peru =

Peru's regions are shaded in based on their population.

Immigration to Peru has historically consisted of multiple migrations. Prior to Peru's independence in 1824, there was the movement of Spaniards and Africans to Peru as a result of colonization and slavery. After Peru's independence, there was the creation of the Immigration Law of 1849 as well as the eventual inclusion of other migrant populations.

In 2005, the UN put the number of immigrants in Peru at 42,000, which accounted for less than 1% of its population. However, a more recent report from the Peruvian Directorate of Migrations has put the number at 64,303. The largest group of foreign residents is from Argentina, which accounts for about 14% of the total with over 9000 Argentineans living in Peru. Immigrants from the United States make up just over 9% of the total with 5,800 US citizens now residing in Peru. Other large groups of immigrants in Peru include Chileans, Bolivians, Colombians, Brazilians, Uruguayans, Spanish and Chinese. The majority of foreign residents in Peru live in Lima, with other communities found in Cusco and Arequipa.

== History ==
Before colonialism, Andean communities were connected through the coast, jungles, and highlands, as well as Andean centers. As a civilization, they managed to produce, distribute, and exchange goods throughout Peru and the Andes region. When Spanish conquistadors conquered the Andes region, new forms of regulations developed over the land. Trade, Indigenous people, and government institutions were controlled to fit the colonialist mold, with changes in class and power structure. During the colonial period, African and European movement to Peru increased the population's diversity, with the post-colonial immigration patterns increasing due to the expansion of capitalism, industrialization, and urbanization. Lima's population was 4.6 million residents in 1981, in comparison to 645,000 residents in 1940.

The Immigration Law of 1849 was the first immigration law in Peru. The historical context behind the law was the desire for slavery in order to help expand the agricultural sector and a migration project. This law was meant to bolster the number of individuals available to complete this agricultural work; the migrations were facilitated through third parties. Multiple migrations came out of this law, specifically Chinese immigration and some European immigration. The law also received an alternative name, "ley chinera"; however, Miguel Situ Chang (2021) has argued that this is an inaccurate representation of the law. Despite the desire for immigration at that time, the migrants in Peru did not receive good treatment. Additionally, contract labor is found in the Chinese, European, and, later, Japanese migrations to Peru though the lengths of the contracts varied.

=== European Migration ===
European migration was one of many migrations to Peru. Additionally, Ayumi Takenaka (2004) states that "The Peruvian state, dominated by people of European descent, had always considered European immigration desirable." However, European laborers were improperly treated within their labor contracts in the mid-19th century. The Immigration Law of 1849 was not explicitly for European migration, though there were subsequent laws and programs that were. The German migration was one European migration to Peru, and one source cites this migration starting after, and as a result of, the Immigration Law of 1849. However, another source states that the German and Austrian immigration started in 1857 in part due to Peruvian President Ramón Castilla. Despite the poor treatment Germans received during World War II, including being sent to US internment camps, the German population continues to exist today, as of 2023, in Peru, including in Pozuzo. The Austro-German community in Peru today utilizes the agricultural and tourism sectors to survive and puts their cultural heritage on display. Another immigration was the Irish immigration, in which the migrants were supposed to work 12-hour days for seven years. Although minor in quantity, Danish migration was meaningful in that it helped build the electrical system in the county. The migrant Jorgen Rasmussen (entered the country in 1864) helped with building the electrical system in the country. A plaque with his name on it hangs on the administrative offices of the “hidroelectrica”.

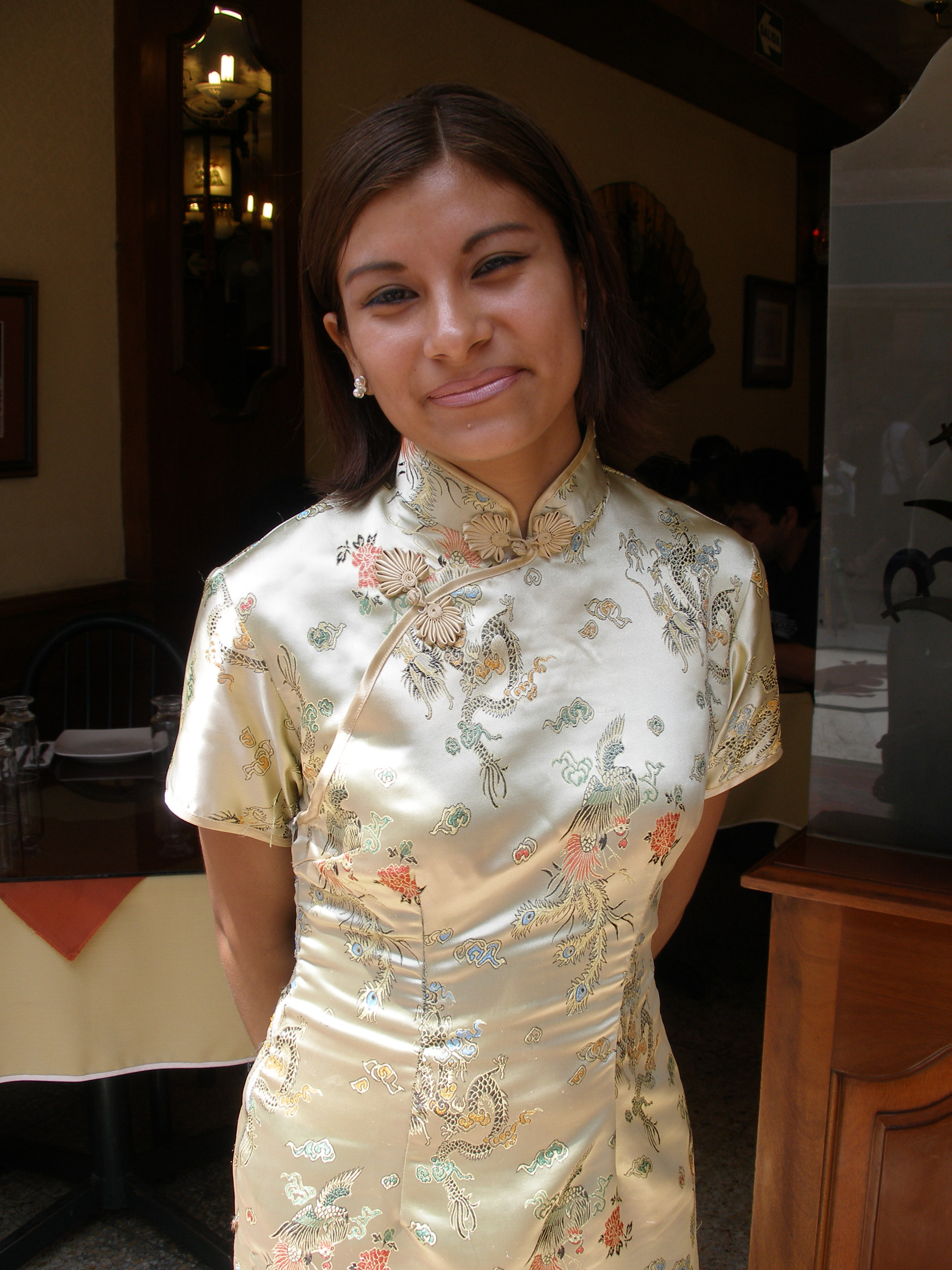
"A woman of Chinese and Peruvian descent in Lima, Peru. Chinese immigrants to Peru from past decades have intermarried with other Peruvians" from Thomas Quine in 2006

=== Chinese Migration ===
The Chinese immigration in Latin America was not unique to Peru, many countries hosted Chinese migrants. "[T]he 'century of humiliation'" in China and the Immigration Law of 1849 both provide context for this migration. Another name that references this migration was "[t]he 'coolie' trade". At this time, false narratives and discrimination also went alongside the Chinese immigration. Somewhere around 87,000 and 100,000 migrants came to Peru around the same time as or as a result of the Immigration Law of 1849, and they would work in the agricultural sector including working with guano. Once in Peru, the Chinese migrants were subject to poor conditions and they were not always wanted. Finally, according to an article from 2024, medicine, the creation of restaurants, and scholars such as Victor Li Carrillo were some of the ways the Chinese population left a cultural mark on Peru.

=== Japanese Migration ===
Another, later, immigration to Peru was the Japanese immigration; however, this immigration was unwanted in comparison to some other potential migrations. This immigration was also a combination of male and female migrants. The Japanese immigration initially was focused on agriculture as there was a need for labor, but shifted to forced urbanization due to a lack of many other options. Another feature of this migration, seen in both the agricultural and urban phases of the migration, was the goal to become return migrants. There were also multiple laws created that placed restrictions on the Japanese population in various ways. These laws impacted both immigration and life within Peru. Some of these restrictions also affected the Chinese population in Peru such as the "'80 Percent Law'". Within the migration, the Japanese population was discriminated against, criminalized and overall looked down upon. Additionally, in 1940, the Japanese population was financially hurt and suffered multiple casualties due to a race riot. Ayumi Takenaka (2004) states that "this was the worst rioting in Peruvian history. Moreover, it was the first racially motivated riot to target a specific population." Additionally, some of the Japanese population became involved in a forced migration out of Peru, as during World War II there was, as stated in the Ayumi Takenaka (2004) article, "the deportation of 1,800 Japanese to U.S. detention camps." Later, one notable figure, as a result of this migration, was Alberto Fujimori, the 1990 president of Peru. However, despite his heritage, Ayumi Takenaka (2004) noted "he had no personal ties with the Japanese-Peruvian community". Fujimori died in 2024. However, Keiko Fujimori and Kenji Fujimori, two out of his four children, have also both held governmental positions in Peru, including in Congress.

== Immigration and Visa Process ==
Citizens from nearly 100 countries and territories, such as the United States, Canada, Mexico, Jamaica, South Africa, Taiwan, Hong Kong, Brunei, and all countries in South America, the European Union, and Oceania are eligible to enter Peru without a visa and stay for up to 183 days. Other countries, such as Turkey, Georgia, Azerbaijan, United Arab Emirates, China, and every African country except South Africa, are required to apply for a visa before their arrival in Peru at a Peruvian consulate in their country or a nearby country. For a tourist visa, required documents are not limited to a valid passport, proof of citizenship, an application fee, and travel itinerary. Staying on an expired visa will result in paying US$1 for each day overstayed, which is able to be paid at a "Banco de la Nación" branch. If a person is unable to pay the fine, they will have to stay in custody until someone pays it off on their behalf. For a business visa, every foreigner is required to apply for one in advance at a Peruvian Consulate in their country. Obtaining a student, work, or other type of visa has different requirements, depending on the situation. For a business visa, every foreigner is required to apply for one in advance at a Peruvian Consulate in their country. Obtaining a student or work visa has different requirements, depending on the situation. A note about this source, however, is that it is a travel website.

To obtain permanent residency, a foreigner is required to live in Peru for at least three years. For naturalization, a foreigner must legally reside in Peru for at least two years, given that they own assets in Peru and they were not outside of the country for more than 183 days in one year. If a foreigner is married to a Peruvian citizen, the couple is required to be married for at least two years before the foreigner is able to apply for naturalization. Peru permits dual citizenship, but this does not grant birthright rights to the naturalized person.

Anyone who lives in Peru for more than 183 days in one year is required to pay for taxes, as they are considered a tax resident. The type of tax paid depends on if the person is a tax resident or a non-resident. Tax residents pay their income tax based on their global income and non-residents pay 30% of their Peruvian income on taxes. Starting residency in Peru after June 30 means that one will not become a tax resident until the following calendar year, shall that person still remain in the country after 183 days.

== Immigrant population by country of birth ==
As of 2019, around 800,000 Venezuelan migrants and refugees were located in Peru, and more than 390,000 Venezuelans have been granted temporary residence permits there. As of 2021, the largest share of immigrants in Peru are from Venezuela, representing 86.8% of foreign citizens in the country.

Country of origin	Population (2021)
Venezuela	1,170,621
Colombia	44,250
Ecuador	14,156
United States	13,444
Spain	13,393
Argentina	11,181
Chile	10,096
Brazil	9,501
China	9,041
Bolivia	7,715
Mexico	5,130
Italy	3,664
France	3,183
Cuba	2,813
Germany	2,645
Uruguay	2,476
South Korea	1,995
Great Britain	1,788
Canada	1,727
Japan	1,326
Other countries	17,478
Total	1,347,893

== Bibliography ==
- Perú: Estadísticas de la Emigración Internacional de Peruanos e Inmigración de Extranjeros, 1990 – 2021 (PDF) (in Spanish). Lima: INEI. 2022.
