= Lars Jaeger =

Swiss-German author and investment manager

- Born: 7 August 1969; Heidelberg, Germany
- Died: 21 June 2024 (aged 54); Uitikon, Switzerland
- Citizenship: Swiss
- Occupations: Swiss-German author, entrepreneur, financial theorist

Lars Jaeger (7 August 1969 – 21 June 2024) was a Swiss-German author, entrepreneur, financial theorist, and alternative investment manager. He published on the history and philosophy of science, technology, and has in the past been an author on hedge funds, quantitative investing, and risk management. In his widely read blog as well as other media he frequently wrote on issues concerning scientific developments, new technologies, and their meaning for society. He was the author of many books on various topics. In 2014, Jaeger published a universal history of science (in German), and in September 2016 a book on the interplay of science and spirituality (again in German). His next book "Supermacht Wissenschaften" ("Superpower Science", 2017, again in German) outlines scenarios of mankind's technological future. His 2018 book "The Second Quantum Revolution - From Entanglement to Quantum Computing and Other Super-Technologies" (2018, English as well as German editions) deals with the latest quantum technologies. His 2019 book "Mehr Zukunft wagen" (Daring more future", 2019, in German) is a confrontation with the impending technological upheavals that lead to what Jaeger calls “The Human Crisis”. In 2020 he published "Sternstunden der Wissenschaft. A Success Story of Thinking" (in German) in which he describes the triumph of science on the basis of four essential intellectual virtues. His 2021 book "Ways Out of the Climate Catastrophe - Ingredients for a Sustainable Energy and Climate Policy" provides an outlook on a possible climate-friendly economy of the future. In 2022 Jaeger published two books: 1. "Emmy Noether - Her rocky Path to the top of Mathematics" (in German) and 2. "The Stumbling Progress of 20th Century Science - How Crises and Great Minds Have Shaped Our Modern World". The first gives a biography - readable also for non-mathematicians - of the greatest female mathematician in history. The second book describes the revolutionary development of ALL sciences from around 1880 to 1950. Two more books are in the process of being published.

Jaeger has for many years been an influential voice in the hedge fund industry on fostering developments towards more transparency, liquidity, and cost efficiency. He was the founder and CEO of Alternative Beta Partners AG and served GAM as Head of Alternative Risk Premia.

== Background ==
Prior to founding Alternative Beta Partners in early 2010 Jaeger had served Partners Group as a partner for eight years. He was a co-founder of saisGroup, a hedge funds asset management firm, which merged into Partners Group in 2001. Jaeger started his finance career in 1997 at the quantitative research firm Olsen & Associates in Zurich. Before he studied physics and philosophy at the University of Bonn in Germany and École Polytechnique in Paris and held a doctorate degree in theoretical physics from the Max Planck Institute for the Physics of Complex Systems in Dresden, where he also performed post-doctoral studies in the field of non-linear dynamics.

== Commentaries on hedge funds ==
Jaeger frequently commented in print, online, and on television on financial issues, particularly around hedge funds, their return sources and risk management for alternative investment strategies.

He has been an early public advocate for independent risk management, transparency, and cost reduction for hedge funds having designed and run one of the first managed account platforms for these historically rather opaque investment structures in 2000. In 2003, based on his investment experience as well as his academic research on hedge funds return sources, he (jointly with Bill Fung and David Hsieh) coined the term alternative beta identifying this as the most important component of hedge fund returns (increasingly referred to "alternative risk premia" today). The research by Jaeger initiated an industry wide discussion on the return attributes (and cost features) of hedge funds which starting in 2007 led to the appearance of hedge funds replication products and more recently to the growth of the "alternative risk premia" industry into a major investment topic of the global asset management industry.

Jaeger was the author of several research articles in leading academic journals. He received the Martello award "best paper of the year" by the Journal of Alternative Investment in 2005 for his influential and much cited paper "Factor Modeling and Benchmarking of Hedge Funds: Can passive investments in hedge funds strategies deliver?".

== Writing about the history and philosophy of science and technology ==
In September 2014 Jaeger published "Die Naturwissenschaften – Eine Biographie" with Springer Spektrum, a book which aims at outlining the history of science from its origins to today for a broad range of readers from little scientific background to scientific expertise in a clear and comprehensible way. His second book "Wissenschaft und Spiritualität" was published in September 2016. Here Jaeger discusses the interplay of science and spirituality. In his third book "Superpower Science – Our future between heaven and hell" (2017) Lars Jaeger outlines a journey into our immediate technological future. His 2018 book "The Second Quantum Revolution: From Entanglement to Quantum Computing and Other Super-Technologies" provides insights into developments and possibilities of the latest quantum technologies. His 2019 book "Mehr Zukunft wagen" (Daring more future", 2019, in German) is a confrontation with the impending technological upheavals that lead to what Jaeger calls “The Human Crisis”. His 2020 book "Sternstunden der Wissenschaft. Eine Erfolgsgeschichte des Denkens" (Decisive moments of science - A success story of hums thinking) describes the origin of science on the basis of four essential intellectual virtues that make up our thinking and which must be defended, especially in times of "fake news". His 2021 book "Ways Out of the Climate Catastrophe - Ingredients for a Sustainable Energy and Climate Policy" provides an entertaining presentation of the essential issues of energy policy and their impact. His two 2022 books are: 1. "The Stumbling Progress of 20th Century Science - How Crises and Great Minds Have Shaped Our Modern World" describes the revolutionary development of ALL sciences from around 1880 to 1950, and 2. "Emmy Noether - Her rocky Path to the topf of Mathematics" (in German)". gives a biography - readable also for non-mathematicians - of the greatest female mathematician in history. Summarizing and reflecting the developments in the world of science through the last 60 years, „ Where Is Science Leading Us?: And What Can We Do to Steer It? “, written together with Michel Dacorogna, was published in 2024. Two books, one on nuclear fusion, another on artificial intelligence, are expected to be published in 2024/2025.

On his web page Jaeger published a bi-weekly blog on matters of science, technology, philosophy, and spirituality. He also published regularly on the German platform scilogs.de.

== Published Books ==
- Where Is Science Leading Us? - And What Can We Do to Steer It? (with Michel Docorogna) (Springer, 2024) ISBN 978-3-031-47137-7 (Softcover), 978-3-031-47138-4 (eBook).
- The Stumbling Progress of 20th Century Science - How Crises and Great Minds Have Shaped Our Modern World (Springer, 2022)
- Emmy Noether - Her rocky Path to the topf of Mathematics" (Südverlag, 2022, in German)
- Ways Out of the Climate Catastrophe - Ingredients for a Sustainable Energy and Climate Policy (Springer, 2021)
- Sternstunden der Wissenschaft. Eine Erfolgsgeschichte des Denken (Südverlag, 2020)
- Mehr Zukunft wagen! - Wie wir alle vom Fortschritt profitieren (Random House Gütersloher Verlagshaus, 2019)
- The Second Quantum Revolution - From Entanglement to Quantum Computing and Other Super-Technologies (Springer, 2018)
- SUPERMACHT WISSENSCHAFT – Unsere Zukunft zwischen Himmel und Hölle (Random House Gütersloher Verlagshaus, 2017)
- Wissenschaft und Spiritualität - Zwei Wege zu den großen Geheimnissen Universum, Leben, Geist (Springer-Spektrum, 2017)
- Die Naturwissenschaften – Eine Biographie (Springer-Spektrum, 2015)
- Risk Management of Alternative Investment Strategies (Financial Times Prentice Hall, 2002)
- The New Generation of Risk Management for Hedge Funds and Private Equity (Euromoney, 2003)
- Through the Alpha Smokescreen: A guide to hedge fund return sources (Institutional Investors, 2005; second edition 2012)
- Alternative Beta Strategies and Hedge Fund Replication (Wiley, 2008)

== Selected other publications ==
- An Old Promise of Physics – Are We Moving Closer Toward Controlled Nuclear Fusion?, International Journal for Nuclear Power, Vol. 65, Issue 11/12 (2020)
- Insurance-Linked Securities (ILS): How to construct an Investable Performance Benchmark, Journal of Alternative Investments, Fall 2011
- Insurance-Linked Securities (ILS): What Drives Their Returns?, Journal of Alternative Investments, Fall 2010
- The Road to Hedge Fund Replication: The Very First Steps, Proceedings to the Karlsruhe Workshop in Econometrics: Risk Assessment: Decisions in Banking and Finance, Physica Verlag (2008)
- The new discussion: Replication of hedge fund strategies, AIMA Journal, Summer 2007
- Can Hedge Fund Returns Be Replicated Inexpensively?, CFA Institute Conference Proceedings Quarterly, Summer 2007
- Factor Modelling and Benchmarking of Hedge Funds: Cab passive investments in hedge funds strategies deliver?, Journal of Alternative Investments (2005); awarded with the Martello award "Best paper of the year"
- Sources of Hedge Fund returns, Handbuch Hedge Funds, Uhlenbruch Verlag (2004)
- Sources of Return for Hedge Funds and Managed Futures, The Capital Guide to Hedge Funds, published by ISIpublications (2004)
- The Significance of Liquidity and Transparency for Multi-Manager Portfolios of Alternative Investment Strategies, Fund of funds, Euromoney Publications (2003)
- Sources of Return for Hedge Funds and Managed Futures, AIMA Newsletter, September 2002
- "The Significance of Liquidity and Transparency for Multi-Manager Portfolios of Alternative Investment Strategies", published in S. Jaffer, Fund of Funds, Euromoney, 2002
- "Risk Management and Transparency in the Construction and Monitoring of a Fund of Hedge Funds Portfolio", Global Pension, July 2002
- "The sGFI Futures Index", Journal of Alternative Investments, Summer 2002
- "Risk Management for Multi-Manager portfolios of Alternative Investment Strategies- Part II", Alternative Investment Quarterly (November 2001 and January 2002)
- "Transparency and liquidity needs of alternative investment strategies", IPE publications, November 2001
- "Risk Management for Multi-Manager Portfolios of Alternative Investment Strategies", AIMA Newsletter, April 2001
- "Experimental Verification of Noise Induced Attractor Deformation," Physical Review Letters, No. 82 (11), p. 2274, March 1999.
- "Improved Cost Function for Modeling of Noisy Chaotic Time Series," Physica D, No. 109, p. 59, November 1997.
- "New Results on Generating Partitions of Two-Dimensional Maps," Journal of Physics A, No. 30, p. L567, November 1997.
- "Homoclinic Tangencies and Non-Normal Jacobians - Effects of Noise in Non-Hyperbolic Chaotic Systems," Physica D, No. 105: p. 79, 15 June 1997.
- "Effective Deterministic Models for Chaotic Motion Perturbed by Interactive Noise," Physical Review E, No. 55: p. 5234, May 1997.
- "Unbiased Reconstructing of the Dynamics Underlying a Noisy Chaotic Time Series," Chaos, No. 6: p. 440, September 1996.
- "Molecules Interacting with Start Intense Laser Pulses: the Dynamical Role of Quasistationary States," Journal of Chemical Physics, No. 104: p. 8943, 8 June 1996.
- "Shape Dependencies in Pulsed Laser Matter Interactions", Journal of Chemical Physics, No. 102: p. 7124, 8 May 1995.
