= Thomas Schneeweis =

Thomas Schneeweis, professor of finance at the School of Management, University of Massachusetts Amherst, Amherst, MA, is also the director of the Center for International Securities and Derivatives Markets there.

He is president of Alternative Investment Analytics, LLC, which he established in 2005, as a consultancy in the fields of multi-advisor hedge fund creation and asset allocation.

He is a frequent speaker at academic and financial-services industry events and is often quoted press (i.e. the Financial Times, Business Week and the Wall Street Journal.
