= Chea Vannath =

Cambodian anti-corruption activist (born 1948)

- ជា វណ្ណាត
- Born: 1948 (age 77–78)
- Education: Portland State University
- Notable work: A Cambodian Survivor’s Odyssey (2016)

Chea Vannath (Khmer: ជា វណ្ណាត; born 1948) is a Cambodian anti-corruption activist, democracy activist and translator. She served as president of the Center for Social Development (CSD).

== Biography ==
Vannath was born in 1948 in Cambodia.

Vannath fled Cambodia when the Khmer Rouge attempted to arrest her husband, who was a former Major in the Cambodian Army, and after being forced to work in labour camps. They escaped to Thailand, then to the United States of America. Vannath studied at master's degree in public administration at Portland State University while living in America.

After living as a refugee in America for ten years, Vannath returned to Cambodia in 1992. She worked as a translator for the United Nations Transitional Authority in Cambodia (UNTAC, the United Nations peacekeeping mission to implement Cambodian-Vietnamese peace) and served as president of the non-governmental organisation Center for Social Development (CSD) from its establishment in 1995. In October 1999, Vannath gave a paper at the 9th International Anti-Corruption Conference in Durban, South Africa, on "Anti-Corruption Activities: Case of Cambodia (Working with Reform Willing Government)."

In 2005, Vannath was named a Nobel Peace Prize 1000 PeaceWomen Across the Globe (PWAG).

Vannath's autobiography, A Cambodian Survivor’s Odyssey, was released in with 170 pages in English and 214 pages in Khmer in 2016. She has also contributed to the Peace Review journal.
