= Hsieh Fen-fen =

Taiwanese police officer

Hsieh Fen-fen (Chinese: 謝芬芬; pinyin: Xiè Fēnfēn; born c. 1950) is a Taiwanese retired police officer.

Hsieh began her law enforcement career after her husband died of cancer. She earned an associate degree from Central Police College, and accepted a position an assistant position at the Taipei City Police Department's Female Police Division, within the Personnel Department. Hsieh was subsequently assigned to Jingmei Precinct first as deputy chief, and later first division chief. As the first woman Juvenile Affairs Division chief in Taiwan, Hsieh established the Spring Wind Program to limit minors' access to certain areas after midnight. Mayor of Taipei Chen Shui-bian considered naming Hsieh a police precinct leader in 1998, but decided against the appointment. When Chen was elected President of the Republic of China, Hsieh became his first chief of security, as well as the first woman to lead the Presidential Office Security Department. Hsieh joined the Democratic Progressive Party in January 2003. In March 2003, Hsieh was named the leader of the Yilan County Police Department, and became the first women to head a county-level police department in Taiwan. Hsieh competed at the 2009 World Police and Fire Games in Canada for Team Taiwan. Hsieh later led the education division at the National Police Agency before retirement.
