= Ke-Chiang Hsieh =

Ke-Chiang Hsieh is a Chinese-born astrophysicist.

Hsieh earned a doctorate at the University of Chicago in 1969 and taught at the University of Arizona. In 2000, he was elected a fellow of the American Physical Society "[f]or pioneering the measurement of energetic neutral particles in space plasma, thereby opening the door to a new frontier of space research."
