= Chua =

Chua is a Hokkien or Teochew romanisation of the surname Cai. People so named include:

- Alfrancis Chua (born 1966), Filipino sports executive
- Amy Chua (born 1962), American corporate lawyer, legal academic and author
- Chua Beng Huat, Singaporean sociologist
- Dino Carlo Chua (born 1980), Filipino businessman and politician
- Brent Chua (born 1985), Chinese-Filipino model and fashion photographer
- Chua Ek Kay (1947–2008), Singaporean artist
- Chua Enlai (born 1979), Singaporean comedian and actor
- Jean Chua (born 1987), Malaysian professional golfer
- Chua Jim Neo (1905–1980), Singaporean chef and cookbook writer
- Joel Chua (born 1972), Filipino lawyer and politician
- Joi Chua (born 1978), Singaporean singer
- Jonathan Chua (born 1990), Singaporean actor and singer
- Chua Jui Meng (1943–2023), Malaysian politician
- Kat Chua (born 1992), Filipino politician
- Chua Lam (born 1941), Singaporean columnist and food critic
- Leon O. Chua (born 1936), American electrical engineer and computer scientist
- Manuel Chua (c. 1986), Filipino model and actor
- Michael Chua, Singaporean film producer, director and poet
- Chua Phung Kim (1939–1990), Singaporean weightlifter
- Robert Chua (born 1946), Singaporean broadcaster and businessman
- Chua Ser Lien (1961–2020), Singaporean kidnapper
- Simon Chua Ling Fung, Singaporean bodybuilder
- Chua Sock Koong (born 1957), Singaporean businesswoman
- Chua Soi Lek (born 1947), Chinese-Malaysian politician
- Chua Soon Bui (born 1955), Malaysian politician
- Tanya Chua (born 1975), Singaporean singer-songwriter
- Chua Tee Yong (born 1977), Malaysian politician
- Chua Tian Chang (born 1963), Malaysian politician
- Tony Chua (1965–2009), Filipino Chinese businessman

== See also ==
- Chua's circuit, an electrical circuit invented by Leon O. Chua, that exhibits chaotic behaviour
