= Hsieh Wen-cheng =

Taiwanese businessman, diplomat and politician

Hsieh Wen-cheng (Chinese: 謝文政; pinyin: Xiè Wénzhèng) is a Taiwanese businessman, diplomat, and politician.

Hsieh earned a degree from the Department of Diplomacy at National Chengchi University and a Master of Laws at the Victoria University of Wellington. Hsieh was a secretary within Taiwan's Ministry of Foreign Affairs and section chief of the Taipei Economic and Cultural Representative Office in Japan. He served in leadership roles within the Overseas Chinese Federation in Japan and the Chambers of Industry and Commerce in Japan, as well as the Tokyo Sun Yat-sen Institute. In September 2004, Hsieh was nominated by the Kuomintang to serve as a member of the Legislative Yuan representing overseas Chinese. He served as a legislator from 2005 to 2008.
