= Wen Shin Chia =

- Born: 1990 or 1991 (age 35–36); Kuala Lumpur, Malaysia
- Education: Universiti Putra Malaysia
- Awards: Queen's Young Leader Award (2018); Bayer Malaysia Young Environmental Envoy Award (2013)

Chinese name
- Traditional Chinese: 謝文欣
- Simplified Chinese: 谢雯欣
- Hanyu Pinyin: Xiè Wénxīn
- Hokkien POJ: Chiā Bûn-hin

Wen Shin Chia (born c. 1991) is a Malaysian environmentalist and entrepreneur.

== Early life and family ==
Chia was born in Kuala Lumpur and raised in Selengor, Malaysia. She is the youngest among two siblings. Her mother died when she was 15 years old.

Chia attended SMK Kepong.

== Environmentalism ==
Chia earned a bachelor's degree in Environmental Science and Technology from Universiti Putra Malaysia. She decided to take it after noticing the increasing pollution in camping and hiking sites she used to frequent to. At her third year, Chia conducted a survey and found out that 90 percent of Malaysian households are oblivious on how to properly dispose cooking oil — a majority admitted to dumping it into sinks, drains and toilet bowls. Hence, Chia's university project was a community-based initiative in recycling cooking oils to soaps.

Chia worked as a product development executive at an agri-chemical company for a few months before establishing Green Yards.

=== Green Yards ===
Green Yards is a social enterprise that recycles cooking oil to eco-friendly products and aims to reduce water pollution in Malaysia in return. Green Yards collects used oil from households, restaurants and markets. They give free soap per 5 kg of oil. In its first year, Green Yards was able to prevent 4.7 tonnes of cooking oil from being dumped.

Green Yards also conducts recycling workshops.
