= David Hsieh =

David Arthur Hsieh
- Born: August 1, 1953 (age 73); Hong Kong
- Occupation: Professor of Finance
- Employer: Duke University

Academic background
- Education: Yale University (B.S.); Massachusetts Institute of Technology (Ph.D.)
- Thesis: Expectations and efficiencies in international markets (1981)
- Doctoral advisor: Stanley Fischer

David Arthur Hsieh (born August 1, 1953, in Hong Kong) is an American economist and professor of finance at the Fuqua School of Business at Duke University. He is known for his research on hedge funds, alternative beta, and nonlinear dynamics in financial markets.

== Early life ==
Hsieh was born in British Hong Kong and immigrated to White Plains, New York at the age of 14. He attended Phillips Academy in Andover, Massachusetts, graduating cum laude in 1972.

== Education ==
Hsieh earned his B.S. degree in Economics and Mathematics from Yale University in 1976, graduating summa cum laude. He then worked at the Federal Reserve Bank of New York before pursuing graduate studies at the Massachusetts Institute of Technology (MIT), where he completed his Ph.D. in Economics in 1981 under Stanley Fischer.

== Academic career ==
Hsieh began his academic career in 1981 as an assistant professor at the University of Chicago Graduate School of Business. He later joined the Fuqua School of Business at Duke University in Durham, North Carolina, where he is currently a professor of finance.

Hsieh has authored and co-authored more than 50 academic papers and one book. His research initially focused on nonlinear dynamics in asset markets, including the use of high-frequency data to measure realized variance and risk.

He later expanded his research to the study of hedge funds and alternative beta in financial markets. Along with William Fung, he co-developed the "Fung–Hsieh Seven Factor Model," which is widely used to analyze hedge fund returns.

Hsieh has served as editor or associate editor for several academic journals, including Management Science, Economics Letters, Journal of Empirical Finance, and Journal of Business and Economic Statistics.

He has also been an invited speaker at more than 80 academic and professional conferences worldwide.

== Research contributions ==
- Developed methods to measure realized volatility using intraday stock data.
- Contributed to modeling of value at risk through nonlinear statistical approaches.
- Co-developed the Fung–Hsieh model for hedge fund risk and return analysis.
- Published foundational work on alternative beta and its implications for financial risk management.

== Awards and recognition ==
- 1999 – Robert J. Schwartz Memorial Prize for best paper on hedge funds.
- 2002 – Bank of America Faculty Award, Duke University.
- 2004 – CFA Institute’s Graham and Dodd Award of Excellence for "Hedge Fund Benchmarks: A Risk-Based Approach," co-authored with William Fung.
- 2015 – Certified Alternative Investment Analyst (CAIA) Award for Excellence in Alternative Investment Research.

== Selected publications ==
- Hsieh, David A. (1991). "Chaos and Nonlinear Dynamics: Application to Financial Markets." The Journal of Finance.
- Fung, William & Hsieh, David A. (2004). "Hedge Fund Benchmarks: A Risk-Based Approach." Financial Analysts Journal.
- Hsieh, David A. (1993). "Modeling Risk in Asset Markets: A GARCH Approach." Journal of Financial and Quantitative Analysis.
