= Chia Chih-ta =

Taiwanese physicist

Chia Chih-ta (Chinese: 賈至達; pinyin: Jiǎ Zhìdá) is the dean of the College of Science at National Taiwan Normal University, NTNU, and teaches at the Department of Physics. To promote the education of physics and its popularity among high school students in Taiwan, Chia participates in many tournaments for physicists. He has led high school students in Taiwan to win three silver medals at the International Young Physicists’ Tournament. He has also held physicists’ tournaments for college students in Taiwan and has invited students from China to join such summits and competitions. Meanwhile, he has long been dedicated to integrating industrial practicum with the education of the College of Science at NTNU.

== Education ==
- B.S., the Department of Physics, National Taiwan Normal University
- M.S., the Department of Physics, National Taiwan Normal University
- D.S., the Department of Physics, Arizona State University

== Position ==
- Commission Member of IUPAP C14: Physics Education 2021-
- Chair of the "Research Center of Science Teachers", 2016-2020
- Founder and Host of Taipei Science Fair (Science Taipei having Fun), 2014-2018
- Dean, the School of Science, National Taiwan Normal University. August 2013 –2016
- Executive Committee Member, the International Youth Physicists’ Tournament. September 2012-September 2014
- International Advisory Committee Member, Microwave Materials and their Application. September 2008-June 2014
- Chairman of the Subject of Physics, College Entrance Examination Center, Taiwan. May–July, 2008; May–July, 2009, May–July, 2011.
- President, Physics Education Society, Taiwan. September 2008-August 2012.
- Council Member, The Physical Society of the Republic of China. January 2007-January 2009.
- Leader, the Project of Cultivating Talents for the International Physics Olympiad, Taiwan. September 2011-August 2016
- Committee Member of the Second Examination, the Physics Research Promotion Center, Ministry of Science and Technology, Taiwan. (March 2008-June 2011)
- Assessment Member, Higher Education Evaluation and Accreditation Council of Taiwan. January 2009-December 2010.
- Consultant, Material and Chemical Research Laboratories, Industrial Technology Research Institute. (January 2005-December 2013)
- Chairman, the Department of Physics, National Taiwan Normal University (June 2008-July 2009)
- President, the Alumni Society of Department of Physics, NTNU. (July 2009-June 2011)
- Member of the Admission Committee, the Training Course for Teachers of Middle Education, the Ministry of Education, Taiwan. (January 2006-December 2008).
