= Strategy index =

Strategy index is an index that tracks the performance of an algorithmic trading strategy. It is a way to measure the performance of a particular strategy over time. Like an index that tracks a particular stock market, a strategy index does the same for a trading algorithm. The trading strategy may as simple as a market sector defined by stocks that belong to one specific industry to complex such as pairs trading strategy. The strategies involved may be based on any underlying financial instrument.

Once a strategy index has been set up it can be used to trade it using and exchange traded fund (ETF) or directly through an investment bank. As a trading strategy index is based on an algorithm it is transparent can be easily calculated. However the underlying strategy may not be effective and the index can be used to show this when compare to other strategies or the whole market.

The trading strategy can be tailored for a specific risk profile and investor and are normally designed and sold to institutional investors by investment banks.

== History ==
Between the early 2000s and the 2008 financial crisis, a number of major investment banks had dedicated strategy index teams that usually worked under the exotic derivatives umbrella of the bank. They would promote these to institutional investors with the following selling points although these were not always true:

- They offer a new asset class that is uncorrelated to conventional asset classes such as equities, bonds and commodities.
- Compared to hedge funds and mutual funds, these strategies are very transparent and the client can buy them only if they like the idea behind the strategy.
- Some types of strategies also benefit from accounting reasons, for instance, in Germany, Notes linked to interest rates can be issued in the "Schuldschein"-format. This enables interest rate linked strategies to be issued as "Schuldschein".

Deutsche Bank was generally considered the leader in this business, with Barclays, Royal Bank of Scotland, Lehman Brothers, Morgan Stanley, Goldman Sachs and UBS all vying for business. This was a profitable part of the investment banking business as it is possible to charge up to 1.5–2.0% annually on these trades, with the usual charge being 1% running, the revenues on a typical 5-year strategy trade are 5–10 times that of a conventional exotic trade.

Prior to the 2008 financial crisis, several Institutional clients and mid-cap corporates purchased products based on these strategies some with disastrous effect as they did not fully understand the risk involved. Some major clients included; Kaupthing (since a nationalized Icelandic bank), Landsbanki (since a nationalized Icelandic bank), Pension funds in Germany and Netherlands such as NAEV and Shell plc, Lisbon Metro and Bancaja of Spain.

== Trading ==
Trades can be structured on these indices from the asset side or the liability for different types of institutions.

On the asset side these trades are usually structured for institutional clients looking to invest their money in a different asset class. A typical trade would involve leveraged returns on an index with a floor on the performance.

On the liability side these trades were aimed at corporate clients, such as midsize companies and banks looking for ways to service their loans. A typical trade involves the corporate client paying Fixed – Leverage * Index Performance and receiving Libor + Spread to service their loan. Some trades entailed the client paying a fixed rate below the fair interest rate swap and receiving an index designed to replicate the Libor (e.g. MMI by Deutsche Bank) – such a saving for the client (interest rate swap – fixed rate) is due to the lower forwards implied by the index (by construction) and the client bearing any potential basis risk (difference between index and Libor).

== Disadvantages and pitfalls ==
Like other financial products, strategies that involve trading strategy indices have burnt the fingers of many pension funds and small bank. The simplest argument against these strategies would be this: If the strategy is expected to be very profitable, the only eyes that it would catch would be the proprietary desks of the investment banks. For example, the fed funds curve strategy actually ends up being behind the curve as it takes action based on what the fed has already done – this implies that the steepening has already occurred.

A more serious issue is the danger that past backtested performance is simply the result of a data snooping bias – especially when signals are plentiful and difficult to justify on economic grounds (e.g. moving averages crossing signals).
