= Víctor Li-Carrillo Chía =

Peruvian philosopher

Víctor Li-Carrillo Chía (1929–1988) was a Peruvian philosopher.

== Education and influences ==
He studied at the Universidad Nacional Mayor de San Marcos, then in France (1951–1954) and Germany (1954–1958). On these trips he met Victor Goldschmidt and Martin Heidegger, among other famous names in philosophy and world culture. In this first part of his life his philosophical interests were focused on ancient Greek philosophy and language, as well as being heavily influenced by Heidegger, whom he recognizes as a teacher.
