= Seah Moon Ming =

Singaporean corporate executive (born 1956)

Seah Moon Ming PJG
- 佘文民
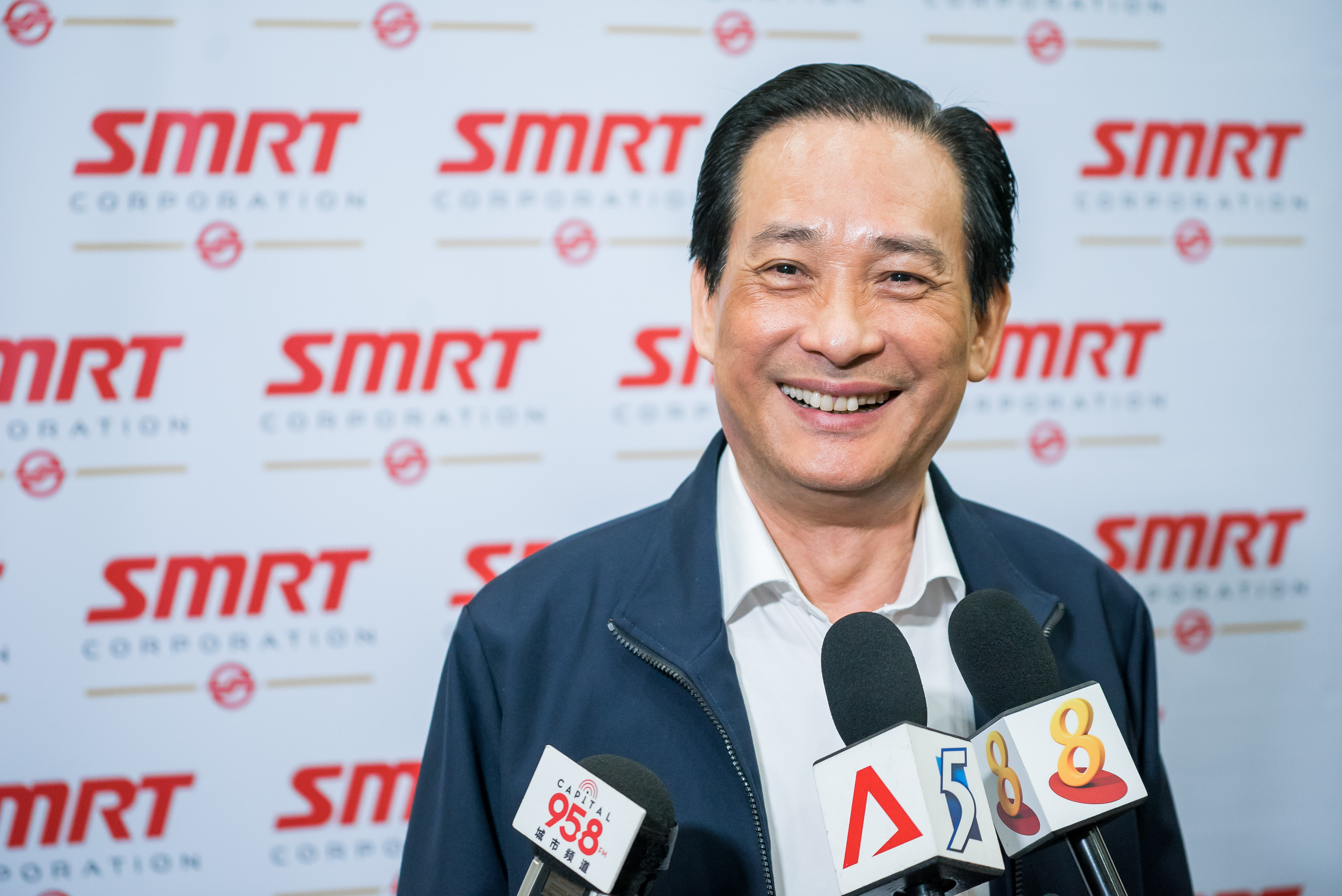
- Born: 28 April 1956 (age 70)
- Citizenship: Singporean; Singapore
- Education: National University of Singapore; Naval Postgraduate School; Harvard University
- Occupation: Corporate Executive

Seah Moon Ming (Chinese: 佘文民; pinyin: Shé Wénmín; born 28 April 1956) is a Singaporean corporate executive who has contributed to several key engineering companies in Singapore, and is currently the Chairman of SMRT Corporation Ltd, SMRT Trains Ltd, SMRT TEL Pte Ltd and SMRT Buses Ltd.

In 2022, he was awarded the Meritorious Service Medal at the National Day Awards. He was conferred the IES Lifetime Engineering Award by the Institution of Engineers Singapore (IES) in recognition of his positive influence and achievements to the engineering community in January 2023.

== Education ==
Seah graduated from National University of Singapore with a Bachelor of Engineering, majoring in Electronics Engineering (EE). He then went on to complete a Master of Science (EE) from Naval Postgraduate School, California and graduated with distinction in 1983. He attended the Stanford-NUS Executive Program in 1993. At Harvard University, he attended the Management Development (1996) and Advanced Management Programme (2005).

== Career ==
=== Early years ===
An engineer by training, he has risen through the ranks to take on senior leadership positions in various organisations. Seah started his career as a Product Engineer with Texas Instruments before joining the Defence Science Organisation (DSO) as a Research Engineer in 1981. He was transferred to the former Defence Materials Organisation (DMO), MINDEF as the Head of Air System Branch in 1987. Two years later, Seah assumed the position of Head, Radio Engineering Department before his promotion to Assistant Director, Communications to take charge of Defence Communications in 1990.

=== Singapore Technologies Group (1994–2013) ===
In 1994, he became General Manager of CET Technologies Pte Ltd (under Singapore Technologies Group) before moving on to become Managing Director and founding President of Singapore Technologies Electronics Limited between July 1997 and August 2009. From 2009 to 2013, he was Deputy CEO and President (Defence) of Singapore Technologies Engineering Ltd, where he drove the defense business and oversaw aerospace, electronics, land systems and marine business sectors.

=== SMRT (2017 - Present) ===
Seah joined Temasek International, where he as Senior Managing Director, Special Projects (1 March - 30 September 2013) established a new entity to focus on natural gas investments. From 2013 to 2018, he was the founding Group Chief Executive Officer of Pavilion Energy Pte Ltd and Pavilion Gas Pte Ltd.

He was the Chairman of Temasek Polytechnic (from 2006 to 2014), Chairman of Singapore Cooperation Enterprise (from 2012 to 2020), Chairman of International Enterprise Singapore (from 2013 to 2018). and Group Chief Executive Officer of Pavilion Energy Pte Ltd and Pavilion Gas Pte Ltd ( 2016 - 2021)

Seah joined the SMRT board on 1 January 2017 and was appointed as the Chairman of SMRT Corporation and SMRT Trains on 17 July 2017. He stepped down from his role at Pavilion Energy to focus on SMRT in 2018. As Chairman, he is credited with introducing Kaizen, the Japanese philosophy of continuous improvement to SMRT in 2018.

=== Directorships ===
Seah was appointed as the Chairman of the NUS High School of Math and Science's Board of Governors in October 2021.

== Honours ==
Seah received the title of Honorary Citizen of Guiyang, China in 2008.

Since Seah took on Chairmanship, SMRT has achieved 1 million MKBF (mean kilometres between failures, a measure of reliability used by train operators around the world) across three of the four lines it is operating - North-South, East-West and Circle lines. (Thomson-East Coast Line, the fourth MRT line SMRT operates, is not yet fully opened). Seah has been credited by former Singapore Transport Minister Khaw Boon Wan for the train operator's performance.

In 2014, Seah received the Public Service Star for his contributions to public service. In 2020, he was conferred the Medal of Commendation (Gold) by National Trades Union Congress on May Day for his significant contributions to continuing workers' welfare and work prospects.

In 2022, Seah was awarded the Meritorious Service Medal at the National Day Awards.

Seah is a member of Eta Kappa Nu – an international honour society of the Institute of Electrical and Electronics Engineers. He is also a senior member of Institute of Electrical and Electronics Engineers. He is a Fellow and Honorary Fellow with the Academy of Engineering Singapore and the ASEAN Federation of Engineering Organisations Singapore, respectively. Seah is a member of Ministry of Finance's ICT Projects Advisory Panel and Honorary President of Singapore Table Tennis Association.

Seah has received several other accolades such as:

- Honorary Fellowship by Institution of Engineers, Singapore, 2003
- 6th International Management Action Award by Chartered Management Institute, 2007
- IES/IEEE Joint Medal of Excellence Award by Institution of Engineers, Singapore & Institution of Electrical and Electronics Engineers, 2008
- Distinguished Engineering Alumni Award by the NUS Faculty of Engineering, 2011
- Oil Council's APAC Executive of the Year Award, 2014
- Meritorious Service Medal, National Day Awards by the Prime Minister's Office, 2022.
- Institution of Engineers Singapore (IES) Lifetime Engineering Achievement Award, 2023
