= Seah Tee Heng =

Malaysian politician (died 1884)

Kapitan China Seah Tee Heng
- 佘泰興

Members to the Council of State of Johor

Kapitan Cina of Johor
- In office 1869–1884
- Preceded by: Kapitan Tan Cheng Hung
- Succeeded by: Major Tan Hiok Nee (as Major Cina)
- Constituency: Johor

Personal details
- Died: 1884
- Children: Seah Leng Chye

Chinese name
- Traditional Chinese: 佘泰興
- Simplified Chinese: 佘泰兴
- Hanyu Pinyin: Shé Tàixìng
- Hokkien POJ: Siâ Thài-heng

Kapitan China Seah Tee Heng (Chinese: 佘泰興; Pe̍h-ōe-jī: Siâ Thài-heng; ? – 1884), also known as Seah Tai Heng, was one of two Chinese members to the Council of State with Tan Hiok Nee. In about 1871, he appointed as third Kapitan China of Johor after Kapitan Tan Kee Soon and Kapitan Tan Cheng Hung. He held the kangchu concession for Sekudai Ulu and had a gambier and pepper firm in Johor Bahru. The road starting from Istana Besar to Johor Bahru General Hospital formerly known as Jalan Tai Heng, named after him. But after the 1970s, this road has been renamed as Jalan Tun Dr Ismail and Jalan Abu Bakar.

He is the father of Seah Leng Chye.

Government offices
Preceded by Kapitan Tan Cheng Hung	Kapitan Cina of Johor; 1869–1884	Succeeded by Major Tan Hiok Nee
