= Yvonne Chia =

Malaysian businesswoman and banker

- 谢姚依雯
- Born: 1953 (age 72–73)
- Occupations: Banker, company director
- Board member of: Standard Chartered Bank Malaysia (chairman); Press Metal Aluminium Holdings (chairman, 2021–)

Yvonne Chia (simplified Chinese: 谢姚依雯; traditional Chinese: 謝姚依雯; pinyin: Xièyáo Yīwén; Jyutping: Ze6 Jiu4 Ji1 Man4; Pe̍h-ōe-jī: Chiā-Iâu I-bûn; born c. 1953) is a Malaysian businesswoman and banker. She was the first woman in Malaysia to be the chief executive officer of a bank. She was the CEO of Hong Leong Bank. She is currently the CEO of Shell Refining Company in Malaysia.

== Career ==
She started working for Bank of America in the 1970s. She became Vice President of the Malaysian Bank of America and head of its marketing division. She left after working there for 18 years. She was awarded the CEO Eagle Pin, becoming the first woman in Malaysia to be awarded it. Chia became the first woman to serve as chief executive officer of a bank in Malaysia when she became CEO of RHB Bank in the 1990s. She became the CEO of Hong Leong Bank in 2003 or 2004. In 2013, she was named one of Forbes Asia's "50 Businesswomen In The Mix".
