= Seah Leng Chye =

Seah Leng Chye (simplified Chinese: 佘令财; traditional Chinese: 佘令財; pinyin: Shé Lìngcái; Jyutping: Se4 Ling4 Coi4; Pe̍h-ōe-jī: Siâ Lēng-châi), also known as Seah Ling Chai, was the son of Kapitan Seah Tee Heng, and one of the members of the Johor Education Department since 1887. He had taken over his father's kangchu concessions, pepper and gambier business, and revenue farms.

In addition, he held shares to eight rivers in his own right and was the manager of the Kongkek (Pepper and Gambier Society of Singapore). Seah was therefore the most prominent towkay (landlord) in Johor.

== See also ==
- Kangchu system
- List of Kapitan Cina
