= Seah Jim Quee =

- 佘任桂

Personal details
- Born: China

Chinese name
- Chinese: 佘任桂
- Hanyu Pinyin: Shé Rènguì
- Hokkien POJ: Siâ Jīmkuì

Seah Jim Quee (佘任桂) was a prominent contractor in Johor, Malaya. He held the Kangchu concession for the kampung of Batu Tiga Belas.

He held a large piece of land near Bukit Chagar and Jalan Lumba Kuda. Jalan Jim Quee, a road near Bukit Chagar, is named after him. Little is known about his private life but he had 7 sons and 1 daughter. His fourth son is Seah Neo Chow. His sixth son is Seah Neo Buan. His seventh son is Seah Neo Cheng (4 July 1895 - 24 May 1963).
